= The Last Egyptian =

1908 American novel and 1914 American film

The Last Egyptian A Romance of the Nile
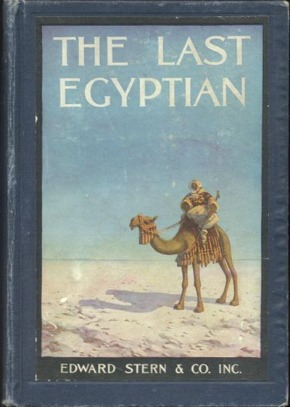
- First edition
- Author: L. Frank Baum
- Illustrator: Francis P. Wightman
- Language: English
- Genre: Adventure novel/romance
- Publisher: Edward Stern & Co.
- Publication date: 1908
- Publication place: United States
- Media type: Print (hardcover)
- Pages: 287
- ISBN: 978-1-58963-919-5
- OCLC: 419213619

The Last Egyptian: A Romance of the Nile is a novel written by L. Frank Baum, famous as the creator of the Land of Oz. The book was published anonymously on May 1, 1908 by Edward Stern & Co. of Philadelphia, with eight color plate illustrations by Francis P. Wightman. Baum left his name off of the book because he was concerned that "masquerading as a novelist" might hurt his career as a writer for children; but he identified himself as the author of the book during his lifetime when making fantasy films for children proved a financial disaster.

The novel was reissued as a 304-page trade paperback in July 2002 by Fredonia Books in the wake of the growing critical reappraisal and public interest in Baum's work. It was the first time the book was published under Baum's name. As with Baum's other adventure novels for adult readers (which were published under the name Schuyler Staunton, a slight alteration of his maternal uncle's name, not used here owing to the different publisher), it is inspired by the works of H. Rider Haggard that Matilda Joslyn Gage had encouraged him and his wife (her daughter) to read.

== Plot summary ==
The novel focuses on three protagonists, which are, in order of appearance, Gerald Winston, an Egyptologist, Kāra, an Egyptian man, and a dragoman named Tadros. Kāra claims to be a descendant of Ahtka-Rā, High Priest of Ămen, whom he says ruled Rameses II as his puppet, including hiding the latter's death for two years--archaeology says Rameses reigned 67 years, but according to Kāra, he ruled only 65. All of this Kāra has learned since he was a child from his grandmother, Princess Hatatcha, who had fled from Egypt when she was 17 and created a stir, ultimately marrying Lord Roane, Kāra's grandfather. Hatatcha is a cruel and vindictive old woman, but as she is dying, she gives him information about the large treasure cache that they have been living on, including many hieroglyphic papyri from which she educated him as a child that will prove to the world that she is of royal lineage. It is within the cliff that their home is built in that the treasure is kept, behind a wall built over an opening of a cavern too deep to use as a shelter. Tadros and the Bey compete to acquire these papyri from him to sell, and Kāra nearly kills the former for stealing one, but he stops, knowing he can use him. He allows him to have that one in exchange for the girl Nepthys, whose principal interest is cigarette smoking, whom Tadros is set to acquire for another's harem.

After Hatatcha's funeral, Kāra steals the donkey of Nikko, an old blind man, for the elderly black-skinned dwarf embalmer, Sebbet, to transport her remains for mummification. He meets Winston on his dahabeah and accompany him to Cairo. In Cairo, Kāra seeks to have his gems recut in the modern style, but instead sells them for cash, and takes his steps toward revenge on Lord Roane. Roane is now elderly and of poor reputation, while his son, Viscount Roger Consinor is a professional gambler. Kāra manipulates things to get Charles (Lord Roane) a diplomatic post in Cairo. There, he catches Roger cheating with marked cards and loaded dice at the club, puts Nepthys in his personal harem, and then proceeds to make moves on Lord Roane's granddaughter, Aneth Consinor, who has been sent back to the family from school on account of unpaid tuition. He falls in love with Aneth (as does Winston), causing him to send Nepthys back home, but when she refuses to marry him, considering him a friend and herself unready for marriage, he quickly returns to his desire for his grandmother's revenge. Winston tells Kāra that the latter cannot marry her because they are cousins, but Kāra cares not, stating that Egyptian kings married their sisters, so marrying a cousin is nothing. Lord Roane has embezzled money via McFarland, a contractor on a sham embankment project. Kāra is aware of this and tries to blackmail Lord Roane into forcing Aneth into marriage with him. Roane refuses, saying his granddaughter should not hurt for his misdeeds. Kāra then approaches Aneth with the proposition, and she agrees to marry him to protect her grandfather's secret. Kāra gives her documents, which prove her grandfather's crime, for her to destroy. (In fact, these documents are forged copies; Kāra retains the true incriminating documents.) Winston, upon learning that Kāra's accusation is true, conspires with Aneth's companion, Mrs. Lola Everingham, to woo her into marriage with himself. This causes the dutiful girl more pain if anything, creating a longing for something she will not let herself have.

Back when Kāra was a poor resident of a village named Fedah, Tadros had been insulting and abusive of him. Now that Kāra is the master, he admits to Tadros that he eventually intends to take his revenge on the servant when his usefulness is ended. This is on Tadros' mind when he chances to meet Winston at a hotel bar. The two conspire to help Aneth and Lord Roane escape from Kāra's influence; Tadros is motivated both by hatred and fear of Kāra and the money Winston agrees to pay him. Winston, Roane, and Mrs. Everingham plan to abduct Aneth to Winston's riverboat, a dahabeah. When this is accomplished, they tell her that Kāra has decided he does not want to marry her and released her from her promise. (This is partly true; Tadros explained to the others that Kāra had planned a fake Christian ceremony, with one of his servants in the robes of a Coptic priest. Aneth would not be legally married, and thus shamed and unmarriageable.) When the boat has left Cairo, one of Kāra's spies informs him of Tadros' betrayal and the party's escape. Kara travels up the Nile himself and meets with Sheik Antar, a large Arab who dyes his grey beard black, and his Muslim followers, who also live in a small town on the Nile inhospitable to strangers. He enlists Antar's aid with the promise of great wealth. (It would be only a tiny fraction of Kāra's treasure, but of substantial value to anyone else.) Kāra attacks the dahabeah with Antar and his men. All are captured except Tadros, who escapes by diving into the Nile. Now alone and nearly penniless, he decides that the best place to hide would be his hometown of Fedah. He boards a train and by chance meets Viscount Consinor, who had been traveling aimlessly since his disgrace in Cairo. This gives Tadros an idea: with Consinor's help, they can become wealthy and revenge themselves on Kāra. As Kāra's servant, Tadros knows that he'd been buying on credit for some time. The prince must have run out of his valuables in Cairo, and will be forced to soon return to his hidden treasure in Fedah for more gemstones. By observing Kāra secretly, Tadros and Roger Consinor plan to find the location of the treasure.

On the dahabeah, Kāra orders Antar to kill Winston, but the sheikh refuses until he receives his payment. (He claims he does not wish to dirty his sword more than once; when he sees the gems, he'll gladly kill Winston and anyone else Kāra wants.) When Tadros learns that Kāra has reached the outskirts of Fedah, he has Roger hide under the rushes that Hatatcha used as a bed. Tadros asks him if he is "comfortable", to which he replies "not very", —- but enough to remain still for several hours. From there he is able to see which stones Kāra presses in the wall to enter into the secret passage. A while after Kāra enters the tunnels, Consinor becomes too nervous to wait for his return, and enters the passage himself. Since one of his first trips to the treasure room, Kara had taken the Talisman of Ahkta-Rā and worn it on his finger, in spite of the curse upon it. He believed it would give him his ancestor's power if he used it only "temporarily". But on this fateful trip to the treasure, a statue of Isis, which had fallen the last time he was in the tomb, falls again, knocking the Talisman off his hand, making him stumble, and knocking out his lamp. In the darkness, he sees the Talisman return to its spot—or perhaps he is confusing it with the candle Consinor is using. Kāra attacks Roger, but Roger is a skilled wrestler and manages to get on top of him as Kāra tries to asphyxiate him. He is able to knock Kāra's head to the ground long enough that he loses consciousness, allowing Roger to flee. Kāra, though, has inadvertently removed the dagger that keeps open the vault door, which cannot be opened from the inside. Even as Roger hears him regain consciousness and get up, he is unaware that Kāra is trapped in the tomb. When Roger rushes from the passage, he is fatally stabbed by Nepthys, who had been waiting by the door and mistook him for Kāra. When Winston's dahabeah arrives at Fedah, Tadros tells Antar that the police have come and taken Kāra and will also arrest Antar and his men if caught. Although he must work to convince Antar he has nothing to do with the police, eventually he gets the Arabs to flee northward. Not knowing what has happened to Kāra, and not wishing Nepthys to be punished for the death of Roger Consinor, he gives the same story to Winston and the others, and is triumphantly hired to be their dragoman as they go on to Luxor for the wedding of Aneth Consinor to Gerald Winston.

== Film adaptation ==
The Last Egyptian
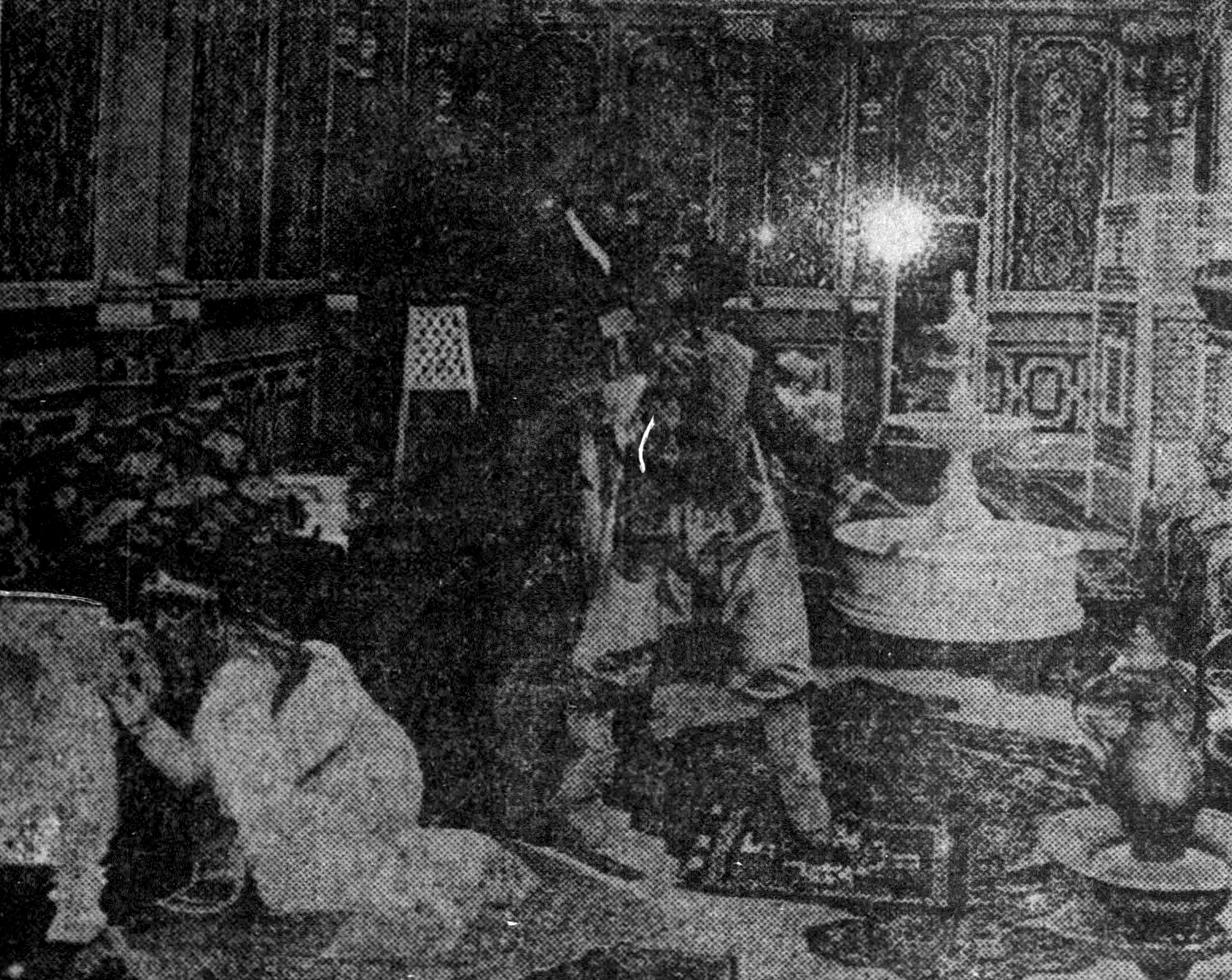
- Scene from the film
- Directed by: J. Farrell MacDonald
- Written by: L. Frank Baum
- Produced by: L. Frank Baum; Louis F. Gottschalk
- Starring: J. Farrell MacDonald; Vivian Reed; J. Charles Haydon; Howard Davies; Jane Urban; Mai Wells
- Cinematography: James A. Crosby
- Music by: Louis F. Gottschalk
- Distributed by: Alliance Program
- Release date: December 14, 1914
- Country: United States

That the book was Baum's was made clear in the December 1914 release of a film version of the novel, written and produced by Baum, and directed and starring J. Farrell MacDonald in the title role. (However, the October 17, 1914 issue of Motion Picture News stated that the film was being directed by Baum and J. Charles "Hayden" [sic].) According to a company press release, the film was representing a new direction for The Oz Film Manufacturing Company, and would be followed by adaptations of both "Schuyler Staunton" novels, The Fate of a Crown and Daughters of Destiny, although they are now both attributed to Baum with no mention of Staunton. The film was not successful; the Oz name had been temporarily tainted as "box office poison" for producing films then-considered too juvenile, and even a name change to Dramatic Feature Films did not help it in the eyes of exhibitors.

This film, unlike the other three features of The Oz Film Manufacturing Company, has never been issued for home use. The only known copy of the film is held by the Museum of Modern Art. Experimental filmmaker Bill Morrison used clips of it in his 2002 film, Decasia, the Hatatcha name on a tomb being the giveaway. Morrison was contacted about his use of the film by Scott Andrew Hutchins, and told him that he had obtained the print from MoMA. Hutchins alerted a skeptical Michael Patrick Hearn to its presence at MoMA, which had never screened it. Hearn attended a private screening, after which he arranged for the film's first public screening since 1914/5 at "The Wonderful Weekend of Oz," October 10–12, 2008, in conjunction with the Matilda Joslyn Gage home and sponsored by Classic Carpet Care. The film was shown on the 11th at 6:30 PM at the Palace Theatre in Syracuse, New York, but only three of the five reels are owned by MoMA. Baum scholars Hearn and David Moyer presented the film with commentary.

=== Cast ===
- Kāra, the Last Egyptian: J. Farrell MacDonald
- Winston Bey: Howard Davies
- Tadros the Dragoman: J. Charles Haydon
- Nepthys: Jane Urban
- Princess Hatatcha: Mai Wells
- Sebbet the Embalmer: Fred Woodward
- Aneth Consinor: Vivian Reed
- Lord Roane: Frank Moore
- Viscount Consinor Jefferson Osborne
- Tilga, Keeper of the Harem: Mrs. Emmons
- Mrs. Everingham: Ora Buckley
- Sheik Antar: Pierre Couderc
