= The Oz Film Manufacturing Company =

1914 to 1915 American film company

Oz Film Manufacturing Company
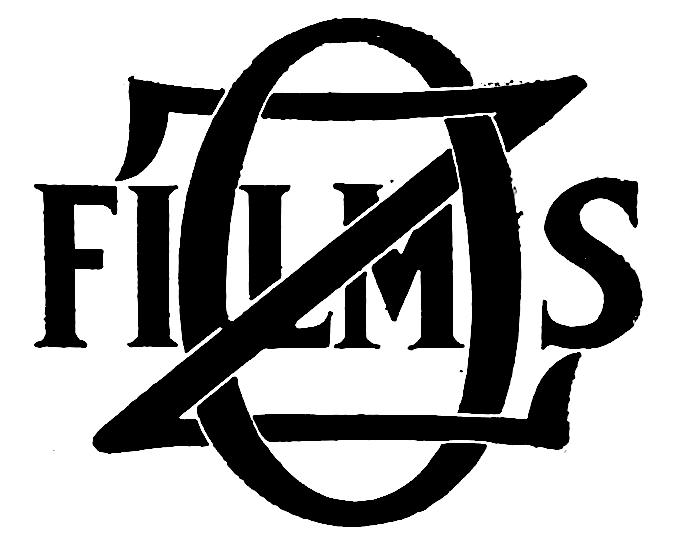
- Type: Private
- Industry: Film industry
- Founded: 1914; 112 years ago
- Founder: L. Frank Baum
- Defunct: 1915; 111 years ago
- Fate: Absorbed into Metro Pictures
- Successors: Dramatic Feature Films; Metro Pictures; Metro-Goldwyn-Mayer
- Headquarters: Los Angeles, CA
- Key people: Louis F. Gottschalk (vice president); Harry Marston Haldeman (secretary); Clarence R. Rundel (treasurer)

The Oz Film Manufacturing Company was an independent motion picture studio from 1914 to 1915. It was founded by L. Frank Baum (president), Louis F. Gottschalk (vice president), Harry Marston Haldeman (secretary), and Clarence R. Rundel (treasurer) as an offshoot of Haldeman's social group, The Uplifters, which met at the Los Angeles Athletic Club. Its goal was to produce quality family-oriented entertainment in a time when children were primarily seeing violent Westerns. It was a critical but not a commercial success; even under a name change to Dramatic Feature Films, it was quickly forced to fold. The studio made only five features and five short films, of which four features (in part) and no shorts survive. Founded in 1914, it was absorbed by Metro Pictures, which evolved into Metro-Goldwyn-Mayer.

The company is best known for three of its films that survive today, albeit with missing footage: The Patchwork Girl of Oz, The Magic Cloak of Oz, and His Majesty, the Scarecrow of Oz.

== Studio ==
The studio was located on Santa Monica Boulevard between Gower Street and Lodi Street. The facility would later be used by Famous Players–Lasky (now called Paramount Pictures) and National Film Corporation of America. It was considered state-of-the-art at the time. It was used almost exclusively for interior shots. Exterior shots were done outdoors rather than simulated in the studio. In some scenes, it is evident that some 'interior' scenes were also filmed outdoors.

== Stock company ==
J. Farrell MacDonald directed all of the film productions and acted in some of them. L. Frank Baum wrote all the scripts, and Louis F. Gottschalk wrote complete original scores that were sent out with the films, at a time when improvising stock cues from the repertoire was common. James A. Crosby was the studio cinematographer, and Will H. White was the technical director. The records do not show who was responsible for film editing.

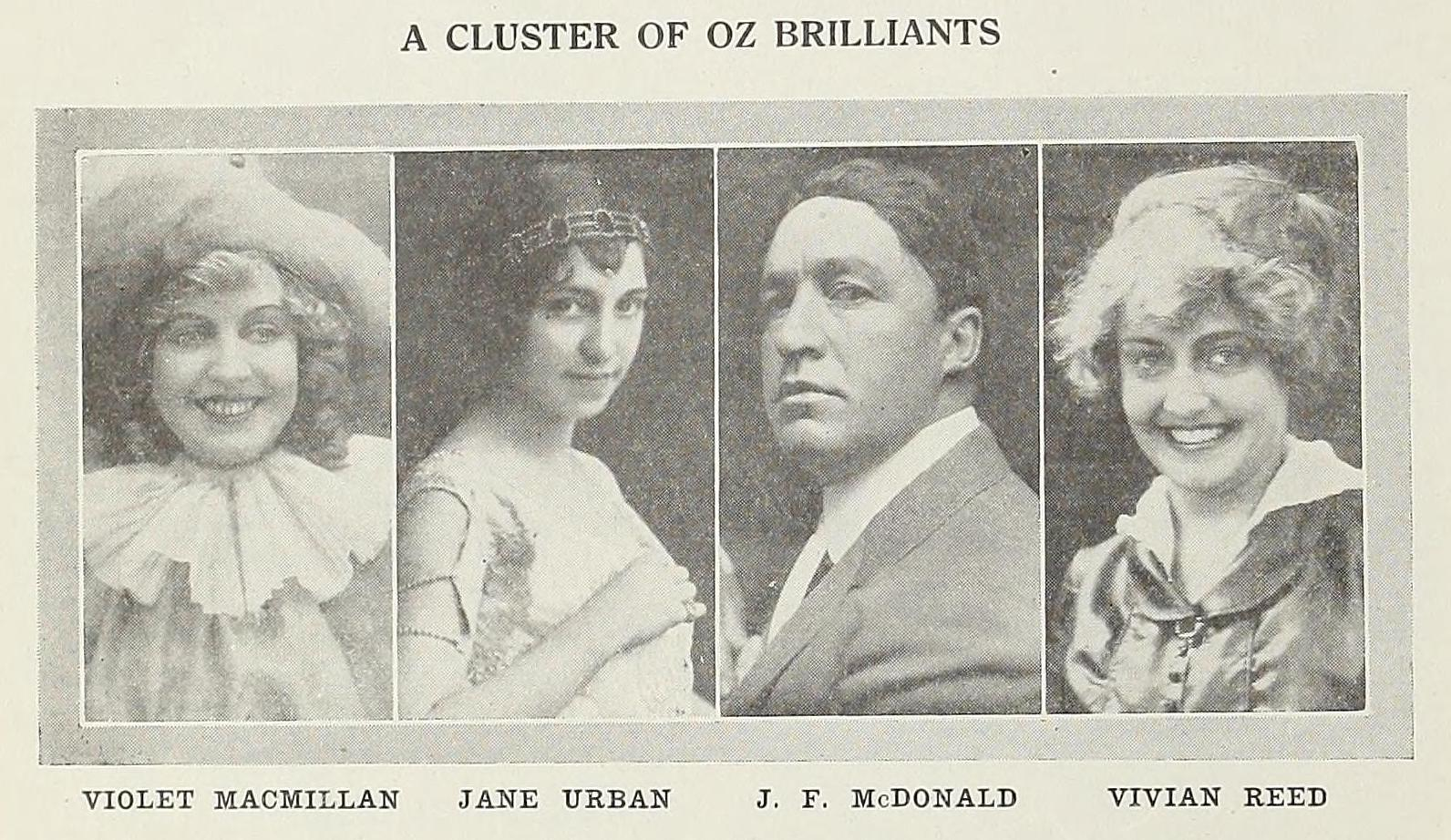
Oz Film Manufacturing Company Players: Violet MacMillan, Jane Urban, J. Farrell MacDonald and Vivian Reed

Among the major players at the company were Violet MacMillan, Frank Moore, Pierre Couderc, Juanita Hansen, Mai Wells, Raymond Russell, Todd Wright, Vivian Reed, and J. Charles Haydon, with animals portrayed by Fred Woodward, who had appeared in the stage version of The Wizard of Oz in 1902. A newcomer on the second project, Mildred Harris, would become more famous for her marriage to Charles Chaplin. Another member of the company was Richard Rosson, whose younger brother, Harold Rosson, would go on to shoot The Wizard of Oz (1939).

== Distribution ==
The Patchwork Girl of Oz was accepted onto the Paramount distribution program, but when the picture fared poorly, Paramount refused to take on the additional productions. When the company's second film, The Magic Cloak of Oz struggled to find distribution, it was re-edited into two two-reel shorts The Magic Cloak and The Witch Queen. Although the full five-reel version was eventually released in 1917 by the National Film Corporation of America, surviving prints of The Magic Cloak of Oz consist of the two-reelers having been recombined. These copies are missing footage and have redone intertitles not consistent with the company's other films.

The third film, His Majesty, the Scarecrow of Oz, premiered in October 1914 and was eventually distributed in 1915 under a new title, The New Wizard of Oz, by the newly formed Alliance Program (later that year, Alliance would also distribute the Oz Film Manufacturing Company's last feature, The Last Egyptian). The New Wizard of Oz would continue to run throughout the next decade. In 1919 it became Hopp Hadley's first (and only) Moovical, in which live actors performed alongside the film playing on screen. The Moovical only ran for a few dates in the New York area before closing.

In September 2024 Nate Barlow premiered a restored version of the film at the CharlOz festival in Charlotte, North Carolina, reconstructed from fresh 4K transfers of three partial 35mm prints: two reels of safety positive, three reels of the tinted Moovical print, and two reels of original picture negative, not known to exist until Barlow rediscovered them at the Library of Congress.

== Logo ==
The ident for the Oz Film Manufacturing Company showed a smiling Princess Ozma staring into the camera, portrayed by Vivian Reed.

== Features ==
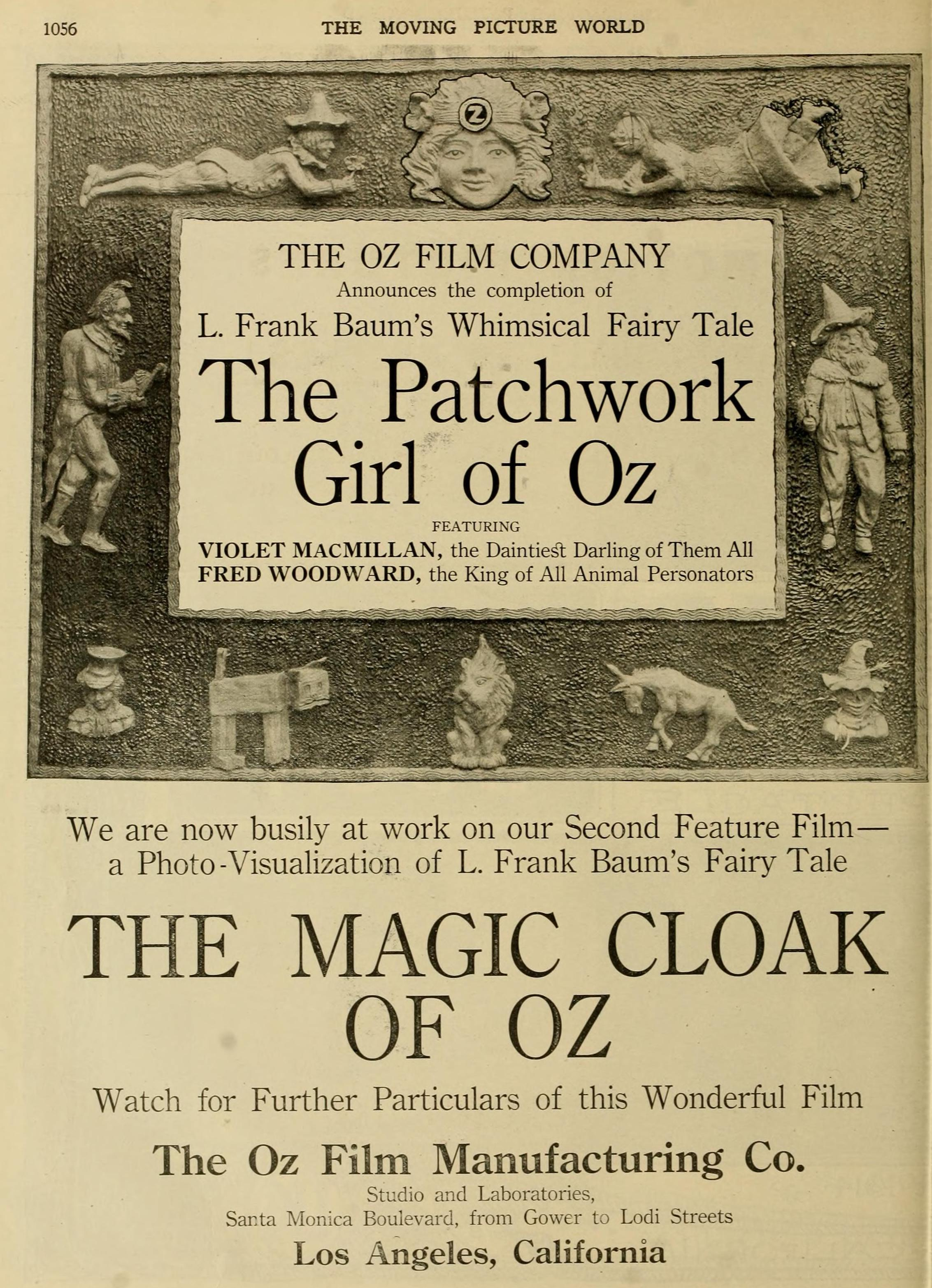
Ad for "The Patchwork Girl of Oz" and "The Magic Cloak of Oz"

The Patchwork Girl of Oz was released in early September, The Magic Cloak of Oz ready by late September, and His Majesty, the Scarecrow of Oz was screened in October but did not get distribution. The Alliance program released a fourth feature, The Last Egyptian, from an exotic orientalist adventure novel that Baum had written but declined authorship credit for commercial reasons, in early December. The studio claimed to be going strong well into the next year, but released only short subjects, and the held-up His Majesty, the Scarecrow of Oz, retitled The New Wizard of Oz to capitalize on the popularity of the stage play well-remembered from the previous decade.

== Short subjects ==
Lost from the company are a series of four short subjects titled Violet's Dreams, which starred Violet MacMillan and Fred Woodward. This was the whole of the company's new output in 1915 prior to the name change.

1. A Box of Bandits (based on Baum's short story, "The Box of Robbers" from American Fairy Tales)
2. The Country Circus
3. The Magic Bon Bons (based on Baum's short story, "The Magic Bon-Bons" [punctuation sic], also from American Fairy Tales
4. In Dreamy Jungleland (UK title: Nearly a Nightmare; working title: "The Jungle") [Note: Alan Goble's International Film Index cites this title as In Dreamy Jungletown with MacMillan as director, though there seems little evidence for either claim.]

Each of these films depicted Violet's interaction with animals (played by Woodward), and magical opportunities to do things she is otherwise not allowed to do, such as visit a country circus prohibited to her because of her gender.

The four shorts were distributed by Universal Pictures via its Rex and Victor companies.

In 1917 George Cochrane produced a film based on these materials titled Like Babes in the Woods. This film should not be confused with The Babes in the Woods, an adaptation of the Hansel and Gretel story made by Chester Franklin and Sidney Franklin, also from 1917. The Babes in the Woods has been released on videocassette; Like Babes in the Woods is a lost film.

== Decline ==
The studio was rented out to others, and was eventually demolished. Unlike the case with The Fairylogue and Radio-Plays (1908), Baum invested none of his own money in the venture and was not financially affected by the studio's failure, though it is probable it impacted his health, which took a turn for the worse not long after the failure.

Frank Joslyn Baum, Baum's eldest son and sometime attorney, who handled East Coast distribution from an office in Times Square, took over the company and renamed it Dramatic Feature Films, which made one feature and one short, probably from scripts by the younger Baum. Although ads announced the release of the feature film, The Gray Nun of Belgium, it does not appear to actually have been released. While some speculate that Baum would have allied himself with United Artists had he been able to sustain the company, there is no evidence for this, nor evidence that he had ever met UA's founding members, Charles Chaplin, Mary Pickford, Douglas Fairbanks, and D. W. Griffith, though Gottschalk went on to work with all of them. It is known that fairy tale/fantasy films were produced more frequently by 1917.

The four feature films were considered lost for many years. By the 1980s, all three fairy tale films were made available on home video. All of the feature films have been released on both DVD and VHS with the exception of The Last Egyptian. The Museum of Modern Art owns a worn copy that was used in Bill Morrison's Decasia, but it remains unreleased and is not part of their screening repertoire. The shorts remain lost.

== In fiction ==
In L. Frank Baum's pseudonymous novel, Aunt Jane's Nieces Out West, the series' principals are introduced to a filmmaker named Otis Werner, who is clearly a send-up of Otis Turner, who made some earlier Oz films, mostly without Baum's input. The nieces decide to establish their own film company for children, and Uncle John name-drops "Hans Andersen, Frank Baum, and Lewis Carroll" as among those whose fairy tales had already been adapted to the screen. The novel was written during the midst of the company's existence and published before the company's fall, and ends before the girls actually do establish such a company.

== See also ==
- The Uplifters (club)

== Bibliography ==
- "The Oz Film Manufacturing Company" (in three parts) by Richard Mills and David L. Greene. The Baum Bugle, 1971-1972.
- The Oz Scrapbook by David L. Greene and Dick Martin, 1976.
- The Annotated Wizard of Oz by Michael Patrick Hearn, 1971, 2000.
- The World of Oz by Allan Eyles, 1985.
