= Raymond Russell (actor) =

American actor

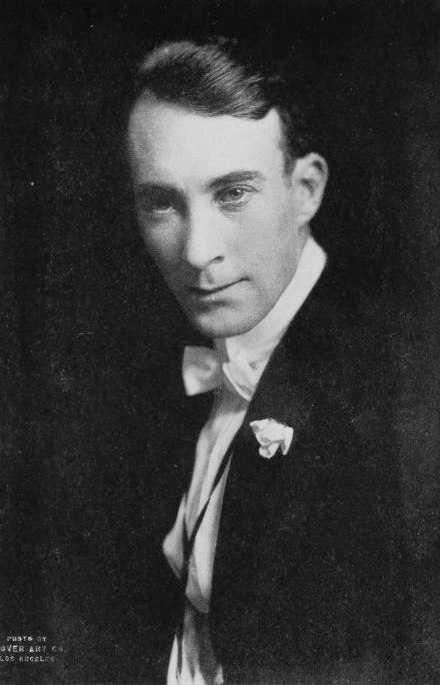
- Born: 1887; Salina, Kansas; United States
- Died: 1918 (aged 30–31); New York City, New York; USA
- Occupation: Actor

Raymond Russell (1887 – 1918) was an American actor during the silent film era.

== Biography ==
Russell was born in Salina, Kansas in 1887. He made his first stage appearances in 1894 playing juvenile roles at the Dewey Theatre in Oakland, California.

Russell appeared in three films with the short-lived The Oz Film Manufacturing Company, all produced in 1914: The Patchwork Girl of Oz as Dr. Pipt, The Magic Cloak of Oz as Jikki, and His Majesty, the Scarecrow of Oz as King Krewl. He also appeared in The Gray Nun of Belgium from Dramatic Feature Films, Frank Joslyn Baum's renaming of the Oz Film Company.
