= Violet's Dreams =

1915 film series by L. Frank Baum

Violet's Dreams was a series of short films written and produced by L. Frank Baum with The Oz Film Manufacturing Company in 1915 and starring Violet MacMillan. The films are not known to survive. Each film depicted MacMillan entering a different fantasy scenario, which, uncharacteristically for Baum, in spite of The Wizard of Oz (1939 film), turned out to be a dream.

== Titles in the series ==
1. A Box of Bandits (based on "The Box of Robbers" from American Fairy Tales) 27 August 1915
2. The Country Circus 10 September 1915
3. The Magic Bon Bons (based on "The Magic Bon-Bons" from American Fairy Tales) 22 October 1915
4. In Dreamy Jungletown 1 February 1916

== Re-edit ==
In 1917, the films were purchased and reassembled as Like Babes in the Woods by George Cochrane from a new scenario by Karl R. Coolidge. The film should not be confused with The Babes in the Woods (also 1917), an adaptation of "Hansel and Gretel" by Chester Franklin and Sidney Franklin, released the same year.
