= Louise Emmons =

American actress (1858–1935)

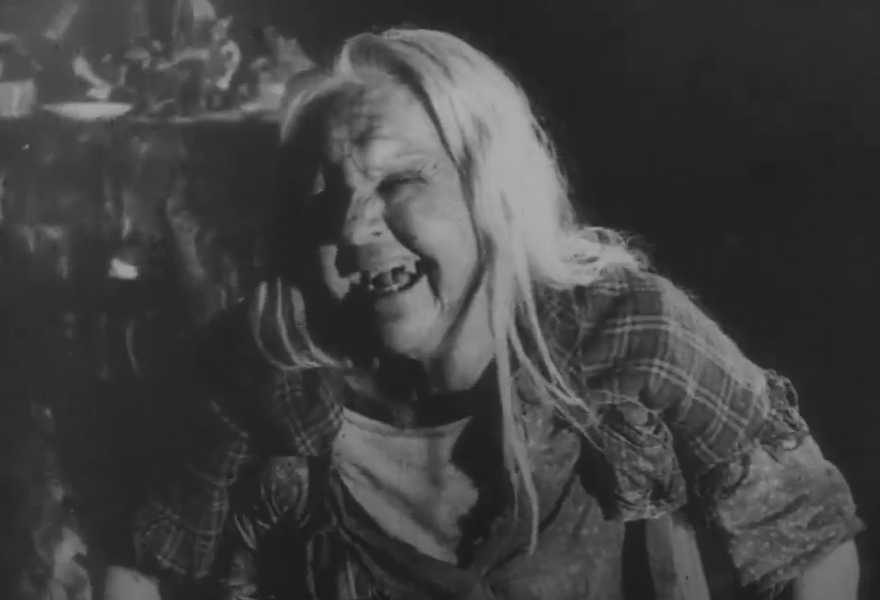
- Emmons in Foolish Wives (1922)
- Born: January 7, 1858; Yuba City, California, U.S
- Died: March 6, 1935 (aged 77); Hollywood, California, U.S.
- Resting place: Hollywood Forever Cemetery
- Occupation: Actress
- Years active: 1914–1935
- Spouse: Roswell Emmons (m. 1904; died 1919)
- Children: 1

Louise Emmons (January 7, 1858 – March 6, 1935) was an American character actress. She appeared in several films between 1914 and 1935.

== Early years ==
Information about her early life is contradictory. Older sources give 1852 or 1861 as her birth year. An article in Classic Images in December 2016 states that she was born in 1872 as Louise Atkinson in California. She was of German descent. Allan Elleburger stated in 2017 that Emmons was born as Louie A. Adkison in 1858 near Camptonville, California. Elleberger says that "got their start from the 1910 census; even though she was in fact 52-years-old, she gave her age to the census enumerator as 37 (making her two years younger than her husband)".

== Career ==
Louise Emmons in Mush and Milk (1933)

Louise Emmons worked for some time as a portrait artist. She already was at an advanced age when she made her first silent film in 1914. With "the kind of face that could stop a clock" she appeared in over 65 films until 1935, mostly in small roles. She specialized in portraying old hags, such as the evil headmistress from the Our Gang film Mush and Milk (1933). Her last film was the horror movie Mark of the Vampire (1935), where she played an old gypsy.

== Personal life ==
Emmons married Roswell Emmons on April 21, 1904 in Santa Barbara, California. They had one son. Her husband died in 1919, leaving her a widow with a 12-year-son to raise.

== Death ==
Emmons died in 1935 from heart disease and pneumonia at the Hollywood Hospital. She was buried in an unmarked grave at Hollywood Forever Cemetery in Los Angeles until her grave was given a marker on March 23, 2014.

== Selected filmography ==
- Judith of Bethulia (1914) - Bethulian Begging for Food (uncredited)
- His Majesty, the Scarecrow of Oz (1914)
- The Last Egyptian (1914) - Tilga, Keeper of the Harem
- He Fell in Love with His Wife (1916) - One of Bridget's Relations (uncredited)
- Bobbie of the Ballet (1916) - Tenement Dweller (uncredited)
- The Grasp of Greed (1916) - Shipwreck Survivor (uncredited)
- The Stronger Love (1916) - Widow Serviss
- Mixed Blood (1916) - Mrs. Valyez
- Polly Redhead (1917) - Mrs. Meekin
- Hearts of the World (1918) - (uncredited)
- The Eyes of Julia Deep (1918) - In Theater Audience (uncredited)
- Shifting Sands (1918) - Ugly woman at Court (uncredited)
- The Wildcat of Paris (1918) - (uncredited)
- The Heart of Humanity (1918) - Village Woman Holding Baby's Shoe (uncredited)
- Captain Kidd, Jr. (1919) - (uncredited)
- True Heart Susie (1919) - Churchgoer (uncredited)
- The Hawk's Trail (1919) - Old Hag (uncredited)
- Flames of the Flesh (1920) - Undetermined Role (uncredited)
- The Son of Tarzan (1920) - Old Woman with Sheik (uncredited)
- The Four Horsemen of the Apocalypse (1921) - French Mother Bidding Farewell (uncredited)
- The Conquering Power (1921) - Washerwoman (uncredited)
- White Eagle (1922) - Stone Ear
- Foolish Wives (1922) - Mother Garoupe (uncredited)
- The Bride's Play (1922) - Faggot Carrier (uncredited)
- The Green Temptation (1922) - (uncredited)
- Blood and Sand (1922) - Old woman (uncredited)
- Big Stakes (1922) - Mercedes' Dueña (uncredited)
- Manslaughter (1922) - Prison Inmate in Laundry Sequence (uncredited)
- Robin Hood (1922) - Villager (uncredited)
- Three Ages (1923) - Old Fortune Teller (uncredited)
- Scaramouche (1923) - Villager (uncredited)
- Maytime (1923) - Gypsy Fortune Teller (uncredited)
- The Ten Commandments (1923) - Elderly Israelite (uncredited)
- Shadows of Paris (1924) - Secondary Role (uncredited)
- Pioneer's Gold (1924) - Mother La Monte
- Open All Night (1924) - Bicycle Race Spectator (uncredited)
- Playing with Souls (1925) - Secondary Role (uncredited)
- The Blackbird (1926) - Old Lady at Mission (uncredited)
- The Greater Glory (1926) - Old Woman (uncredited)
- The Temptress (1926) - Newspaper Vendor (uncredited)
- Winners of the Wilderness (1927) - Frontier Woman (uncredited)
- Bring Home the Turkey (1927, Short) - Headmistress
- When a Man Loves (1927) - Smiling Hag (uncredited)
- The King of Kings (1927) - Member of the Crowd (uncredited)
- Captain Salvation (1927) - Woman on Prison Ship (uncredited)
- The Unknown (1927) - Gypsy Woman (uncredited)
- My Best Girl (1927) - Courtroom Spectator (uncredited)
- The Enemy (1927) - (uncredited)
- Spoilers of the West (1927) - Settler (uncredited)
- The Man Who Laughs (1928) - Gypsy Hag (uncredited)
- Lonesome (1928) - Telephone Caller (uncredited)
- West of Zanzibar (1928) - Old Woman on Street (uncredited)
- Evangeline (1929) - Women Receiving Apple (uncredited)
- Captain of the Guard (1930) - Peasant (uncredited)
- Resurrection (1931) - Old Prisoner with Vodka (uncredited)
- A Connecticut Yankee (1931) - Old Hag in Dungeon (uncredited)
- Waterloo Bridge (1931) - Passerby in Front of Theatre (uncredited)
- Heaven on Earth (1931) - Maggie
- The Wet Parade (1932) - Cackling Hag in New York City Bar (uncredited)
- The Famous Ferguson Case (1932) - Jennie Gibbs AKA Pig Woman (uncredited)
- False Faces (1932) - Woman in Montage (uncredited)
- If I Had a Million (1932) - Idylwood Resident (uncredited)
- Ladies They Talk About (1933) - Prisoner Jessie Jones (uncredited)
- King Kong (1933) - Old Woman in Line at Mission (uncredited)
- Mush and Milk (1933, Short) - Cap's Wife
- Roman Scandals (1933) - Roman Citizen (uncredited)
- Fugitive Lovers (1934) - Pittsburgh Bus Station Newspaper Hawker (uncredited)
- Nana (1934) - Old Woman at Stage Door (uncredited)
- I Believed in You (1934) - Street Beggar (uncredited)
- The Return of Chandu (1934) - Sisaba - Hag [Chs. 4–5] (uncredited)
- Mark of the Vampire (1935) - Old Gypsy Woman (uncredited) (final film role)
