= Vivian Reed (silent film actress) =

American actress (1894–1989)

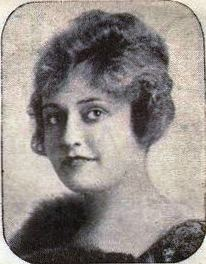
- Reed in 1915
- Born: April 17, 1894; Chicago, Illinois, U.S.
- Died: July 19, 1989 (aged 95); Woodland Hills, Los Angeles, California, U.S.
- Resting place: Forest Lawn Memorial Park, Glendale, California, U.S.
- Occupation: Actress
- Years active: 1914–1938
- Spouse: Alfred E. Green (m. 1918)

Vivian Reed (April 17, 1894 – July 19, 1989), also known as Vivian R. Green, was an American silent film actress. She appeared in 36 films between 1914 and 1938, and was described in news reports during her early years as "the girl-with-the-million-dollar-smile" and a "screen beauty" who was "one of the most beautiful young women in motion pictures."

== Personal life ==
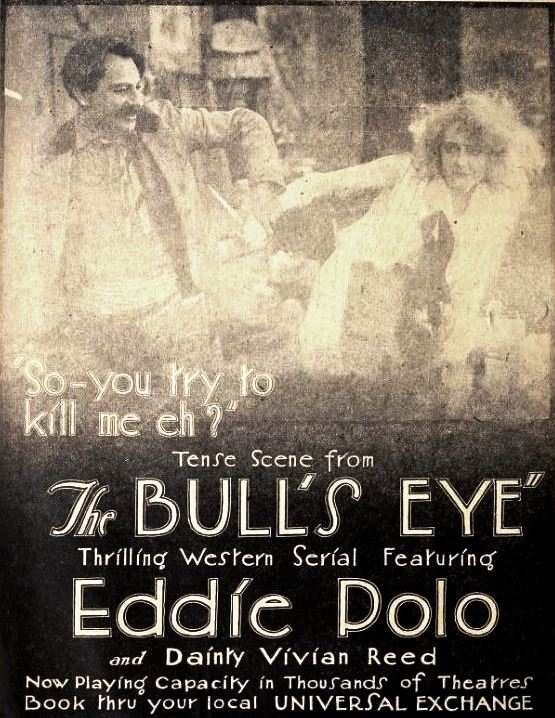

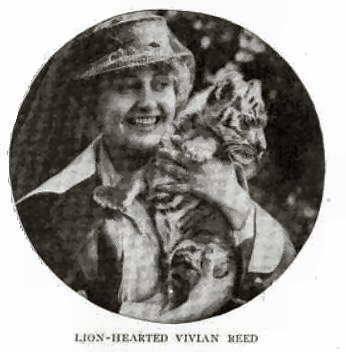
Reed in Motion Picture Classic magazine (September 1915)

Born in Chicago, Illinois on April 17, 1894, Vivian Reed was a daughter of William L. and Cora Reed. Raised in Chicago's twelfth ward during the early 1900s, and educated in the city's public schools, she married film director Alfred E. Green in Manhattan on July 19, 1918. They were the parents of three children: Douglas Green, Hilton A. Green, and Marshall Green, all of whom later worked as assistant directors in the film industry.

Listed in film credits as Vivian Reed during the 1910s and 1920s, she was known by her married name, Vivian R. Green, in later life. She was preceded in death by her husband, Alfred, who died in Newport Beach, California on September 4, 1960, following a lengthy illness.

A resident of the Woodland Hills neighborhood of Los Angeles in her later years, she died there on July 19, 1989.

== Film career ==
Reed performed the role of Princess Gloria in His Majesty, the Scarecrow of Oz. This was the last Oz film produced by L. Frank Baum.

Another of her films, The Lad and the Lion (1917), was the first adaptation of an Edgar Rice Burroughs novel, predating the Tarzan films. As with many early silent films, no copies of this lost film are known to exist. In 1918, she was cast as "the wronged girl," Marie Dubois, in The Guilty Man.

Reportedly an adept horsewoman and "regular whirlwind" with "nerve in abundance" who could "ride a horse with the most daring cowboys" and was "not a mere camera poser," Reed was associated with the Selig Polyscope Company in 1917 and 1918, and appeared with Eddie Polo in the twelfth episode of the 1917 series, The Bull's Eye.

Reed also portrayed Princess Ozma in the introductions to films made by The Oz Film Manufacturing Company. She had a non-speaking, minor role in the 1939 film version of The Wizard of Oz.

== Selected filmography ==
Year	Film	Role
1914	The Patchwork Girl of Oz	Ozma head logo
1914	The Magic Cloak of Oz	Quavo
1914	His Majesty, the Scarecrow of Oz	Princess Gloria, niece to King Krewl
1914	The Last Egyptian	Aneth Consinor
1917	The Lad and the Lion	Nakula
1917	Bull's Eye	Cora Clayton
1918	The Guilty Man	Marie Dubois
