= The Worth of a Man =

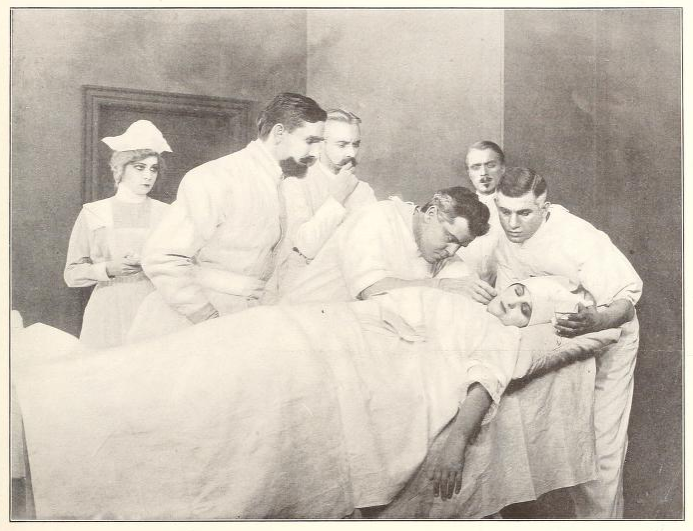
- The climactic operation scene from the film, published in The Implet
- Directed by: J. Farrell MacDonald
- Written by: C.B. Hoadley
- Produced by: Carl Laemmle; Independent Moving Pictures
- Starring: Harry A. Pollard; Margarita Fischer
- Distributed by: Motion Picture Distributors and Sales Company
- Release date: January 25, 1912
- Country: United States
- Languages: Silent; English intertitles

The Worth of a Man is a 1912 American dramatic silent film directed by J. Farrell MacDonald. It was produced by the Independent Moving Pictures (IMP) Company of New York.
