= The Patchwork Girl of Oz (film) =

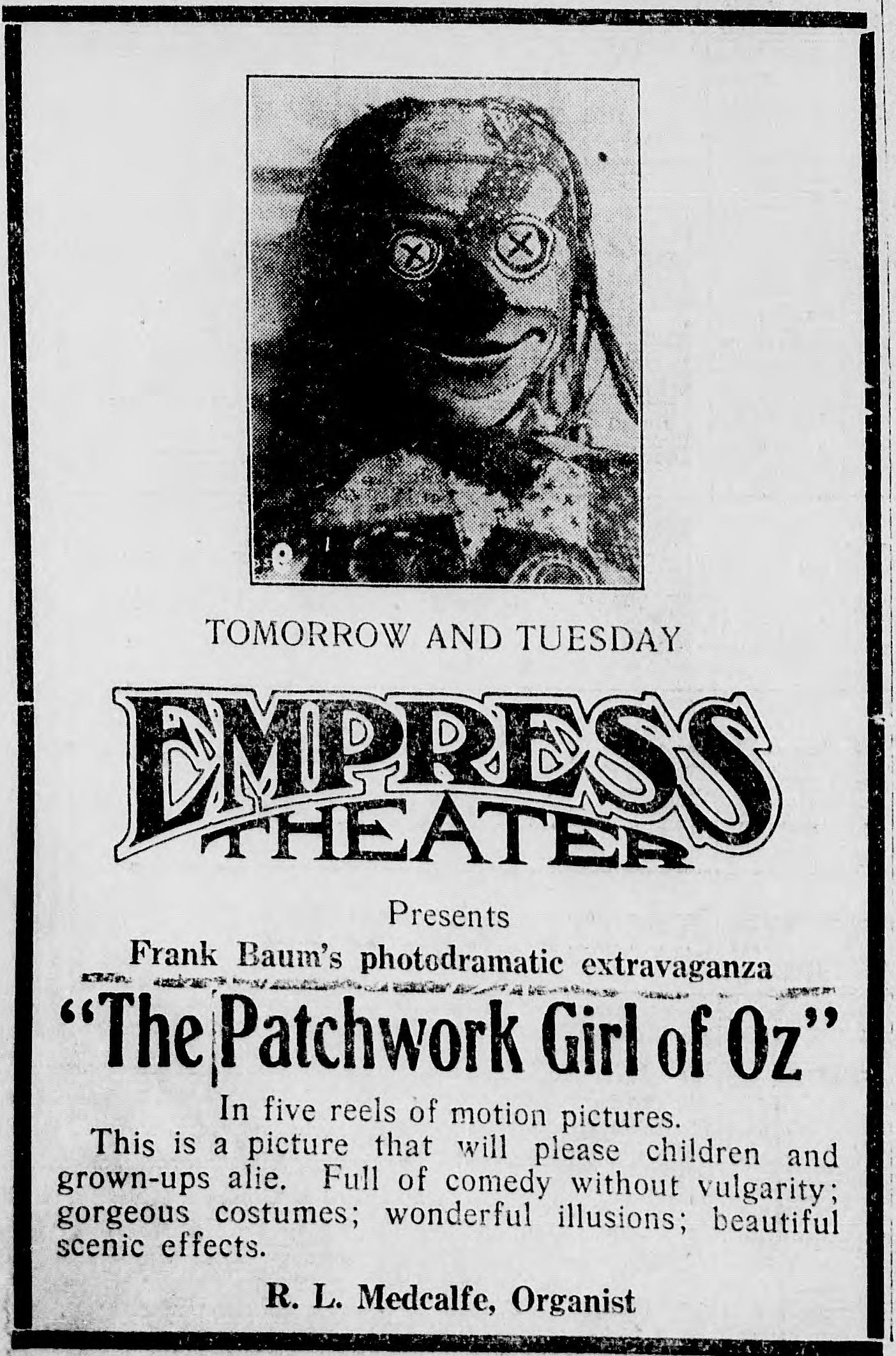
- Contemporary advertisement
- Directed by: J. Farrell MacDonald
- Written by: L. Frank Baum
- Based on: The Patchwork Girl of Oz by L. Frank Baum
- Produced by: L. Frank Baum; Louis F. Gottschalk; Thomas Edison
- Starring: Violet MacMillan; Frank Moore; Pierre Couderc; Fred Woodward; Raymond Russell; Dick Rosson
- Cinematography: James A. Crosby
- Music by: Louis F. Gottschalk
- Production company: The Oz Film Manufacturing Company
- Distributed by: Paramount Pictures
- Release date: September 28, 1914
- Running time: 81 minutes
- Country: United States
- Languages: Silent; English intertitles

The film

The Patchwork Girl of Oz (1914) is a silent film made by L. Frank Baum's The Oz Film Manufacturing Company. It was based on the 1913 book The Patchwork Girl of Oz.

The film was written and produced by L. Frank Baum and directed by J. Farrell MacDonald. It makes almost no use of the dialogue from the book in the intertitles. While there are a number of modest special effects, the movie relies largely on dancing (or rather cavorting), slapstick, and costuming. The Patchwork Girl uses acrobatics regularly. Dr. Pipt's daughter is added for love interest, as well as an additional plot thread: her boyfriend is turned into a small statue which women find irresistible. The plot omits the Glass Cat, the Shaggy Man, Dorothy, Mr. Yoop, The Lazy Quadling, and the phonograph, but also adds Mewel, a donkey, and "The Lonesome Zoop", both slapstick animals, as well as Jinjur, Jesseva and Danx, and Jesseva's friends.

The film was followed by The Magic Cloak of Oz and His Majesty, the Scarecrow of Oz.

== Cast ==
=== Credited cast ===
- Violet MacMillan - Ojo, a Munchkin Boy
- Frank Moore - Unc Nunkie, Ojo's Guardian
- Raymond Russell - Dr. Pipt, the Crooked Magician
- Leontine Dranet - Margolotte, his wife, who makes the Patchwork Girl
- Bobbie Gould - Jesseva, his daughter, betrothed to Danx
- Marie Wayne - Jinjur, a Maid in the Emerald City
- Dick Rosson - Danx, a Noble Munchkin
- Frank Bristol - The Soldier with the Green Whiskers (Omby Amby)
- Fred Woodward - The Woozy, a Quaintness / The Zoop, A Mystery / Mewel, who is Everybody's Friend
- Todd Wright - The Wizard of Oz
- Bert Glennon - The Scarecrow (as Herbert Glennon)
- Hal Roach - The Cowardly Lion / Tottenhot
- Andy Anderson - The Hungry Tiger
- Jessie May Walsh - Ozma of Oz, the Ruler of the Emerald City
- William Cook - The Royal Chamberlain
- Ben Deeley - Rozyn, the Village Fiddler
- Lon Musgrave - The Tin Woodman
- Pierre Couderc - Scraps, the Patchwork Girl (as The Marvelous Couderc)

=== Additional cast ===
- Vivian Reed - Ozma head logo (uncredited)
- Juanita Hansen - Bell Ringer (uncredited)
- Harold Lloyd - Tottenhot on the Jury (uncredited)
- Jacqueline Lovell - Narrator (1996 version) (voice)

== Production ==
Much of the film was shot on the grounds of the Panama–California Exposition in San Diego. Other scenes were presumably filmed at The Oz Film Manufacturing Company's studio facilities in Los Angeles, located on Santa Monica Boulevard.

Notable cast members, one uncredited, were future producer/director Hal Roach and comedian Harold Lloyd. The two of them, after meeting on this film, worked together for several years.

Baum cast acrobat Pierre Couderc in the title role because he was unable to find a woman with the level of acrobatic training to do the role.

== Distribution and preservation ==
The film was a commercial failure, a fact which caused distribution problems for the other Oz Film titles that followed it. This contributed to the failing of The Oz Film Manufacturing Company.

The film is one of three made by the Oz Film company that have not been lost. Some versions contain uncredited narration by Jacqueline Lovell. The International Wizard of Oz Club has extensive information on the production, for example in The Baum Bugle, Christmas 1972. The original film was screened at the 2013 Winkie Convention of the International Wizard of Oz Club with the original Gottschalk score played live by Joe Cascone on piano from Gottschalk's original manuscripts.
