= J. Farrell MacDonald =

American actor and director (1875–1952)

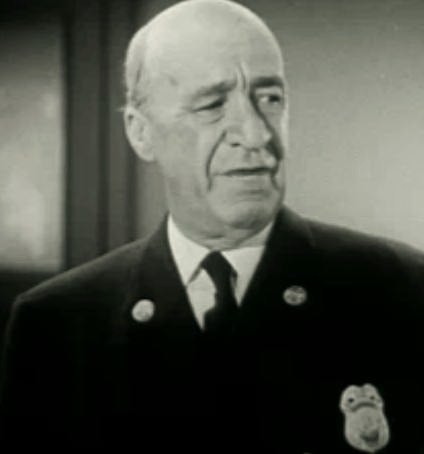
- J. Farrell Macdonald in The Last Alarm (1940)
- Born: April 14, 1875; Waterbury, Connecticut, U.S.
- Died: August 2, 1952 (aged 77); Hollywood, California, U.S.
- Other name: J. F. Mcdonald
- Education: Yale University (B.A.)
- Occupations: Actor; film director; singer
- Years active: 1911–1951
- Spouse(s): Edith Bostwick (m. 19??; died 1943)

John Farrell MacDonald (April 14, 1875 – August 2, 1952) was an American character actor and director. He played supporting roles and occasional leads. He appeared in over 325 films over a four-decade career from 1911 to 1951, and directed forty-four silent films from 1912 to 1917.

MacDonald was the principal director of L. Frank Baum's Oz Film Manufacturing Company, and he can frequently be seen in the films of Frank Capra, Preston Sturges and, especially, John Ford.

== Early years ==
MacDonald was born in Waterbury, Connecticut. George A. Katchme's A Biographical Dictionary of Silent Film Western Actors and Actresses gives his date of birth as April 14, 1875, although notes that one source gives a date of June 6. He was sometimes billed as Joseph Farrell MacDonald, J. F. Mcdonald and Joseph Farrell Macdonald as well as other variations.

MacDonald graduated from Yale University with a B.A. degree in 1903 and played football while he was there.

== Career ==
Publicity photograph of J. Farrell MacDonald

Early in his career, MacDonald was a singer in minstrel shows, and he toured the United States extensively for two years with stage productions. He made his first silent film in 1911, a dramatic short entitled The Scarlett Letter made by Carl Laemmle's Independent Moving Pictures Company (IMP), the forerunner of Universal Pictures,. He continued to act in numerous films each year from that time on, and by 1912 he was directing them as well. The first film he directed was The Worth of a Man, another dramatic short, again for IMP, and he was to direct 43 more films until his last in 1917, Over the Fence, which he co-directed with Harold Lloyd. MacDonald had crossed paths with Lloyd several years earlier, when Lloyd was an extra and MacDonald had given him much-needed work – and he did the same with Hal Roach, both of whom appearing in small roles in The Patchwork Girl of Oz, which MacDonald directed in 1914. When Roach set up his own studio, with Lloyd as his principal attraction, he hired MacDonald to direct.

By 1918, MacDonald, who was to become one of the most beloved character men in Hollywood, had given up directing and was acting full-time, predominantly in Westerns and Irish comedies. He first worked under director John Ford in 1919's A Fight for Love and was to make three more with the director that same year. In all, Ford would use MacDonald on twenty-five films between 1919 and 1950, during the silent era notably in The Iron Horse (1924), 3 Bad Men (1926) and Riley the Cop (1927).

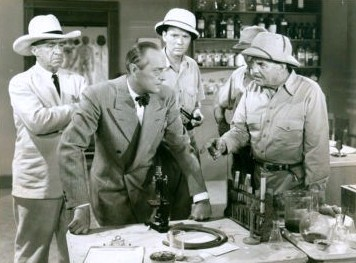
Movie still for Tiger Fangs (1943), J. Farrell MacDonald (left), Arno Frey (center), Frank Buck (right)

With a voice that matched his personality, MacDonald made the transition to sound films easily, with no noticeable drop in his acting output – if anything, it went up. In 1931, for instance, MacDonald appeared in 14 films – among them the first version of The Maltese Falcon, in which he played "Detective Tom Polhaus" – and in 22 of them in 1932. Although he played laborers, policemen, military men and priests, among many other characters, his roles were usually a cut above a "bit part". His characters usually had names, and he was most often credited for his performances. A highlight of this period was his performance as the hobo "Mr. Tramp" in Our Little Girl with Shirley Temple (1935); he also had large comedic roles in Alexander Hall's Madame Racketeer (1932) with Alison Skipworth and Richard Bennett as well as Raoul Walsh's Me and My Gal (1932) with Spencer Tracy and Richard Bennett's daughter Joan Bennett.

In the 1940s, MacDonald was part of Preston Sturges' unofficial "stock company" of character actors, appearing in seven films written and directed by Sturges. MacDonald appeared in Sullivan's Travels, The Palm Beach Story, The Miracle of Morgan's Creek, The Great Moment, The Sin of Harold Diddlebock, Unfaithfully Yours and The Beautiful Blonde from Bashful Bend, Sturges' last American film. Earlier, MacDonald had also appeared in The Power and the Glory starring Spencer Tracy, which Sturges wrote. His work on Sturges' films was generally uncredited, which was more often the case as his career went on – although the quality of his work was undiminished. He was notable in 1946 in John Ford's My Darling Clementine in which he played "Mac," the bartender in the town saloon. MacDonald also had uncredited roles in It's a Wonderful Life and Here Comes the Groom.

MacDonald made his last film in 1951, a comedy called Elopement. His few television appearances also occurred in that same year.

== Death ==
MacDonald died in Hollywood on August 2, 1952, at the age of 77. He was married to actress Edith Bostwick until her death in 1943, and they had a daughter, Lorna. His grave is located at Chapel of the Pines Crematory.

== Filmography ==
=== Silent ===
- The Scarlet Letter (1911, Short) – Minor Role (film debut)
- The Worth of a Man (1912, director)
- Rory o' the Bogs (1913, director)
- Samson (1914, director)
- The Patchwork Girl of Oz (1914, director)
- The Magic Cloak of Oz (1914, director)
- His Majesty, the Scarecrow of Oz (1914, director)
- The Last Egyptian (1914, director) – Kara, the Last Egyptian
- The Heart of Maryland (1915) – Col. Thorpe
- Rags (1915) – Paul Ferguson
- Lonesome Luke, Social Gangster (1915, director)
- Over the Fence (1917, director)
- The Best Man (1917) – Minor Role (uncredited)
- $5,000 Reward (1918) – Norcross
- Fair Enough (1918) – Chief of Police Morgan
- Roped (1919) – Butler
- Molly of the Follies (1919) – Swannick
- A Fight for Love (1919) – The Priest
- A Charge to Keep (1919) – Officer Hennessey
- Riders of Vengeance (1919) – Buell
- Trixie from Broadway (1919) – Slim Hayes
- A Sporting Chance (1919) – Luther Ripley aka Kennedy
- The Outcasts of Poker Flat (1919)
- This Hero Stuff (1919) – Softnose Smith
- Marked Men (1919) – Tom Placer McGraw
- Bullet Proof (1920) – Jim Boone
- The Path She Chose (1920) – Father
- Hitchin' Posts (1920) – Joe Alabam
- The Freeze-Out (1921) – Bobtail McGuire
- Desperate Youth (1921) – 'Mendocino' Bill
- The Wallop (1921) – Neuces River
- Little Miss Hawkshaw (1921) – Inspector Hahn
- Action (1921) – Mormon Peters
- Bucking the Line (1921) – Dave Kinsey
- Riding with Death (1921) – Sheriff Pat Garrity
- Trailin' (1921) – Joseph Piotto
- Sky High (1922) – Jim Frazer
- Come on Over (1922) – Michael Morahan
- The Bachelor Daddy (1922) – Joe Pelton
- Tracks (1922) – Jack Bess
- Over the Border (1922) – Peter Galbraith
- The Bonded Woman (1922) – Captain Gaskell
- The Ghost Breaker (1922) – Sam Marcum
- Manslaughter (1922) – (uncredited)
- The Young Rajah (1922) – Amhad Beg – Prime Minister
- While Paris Sleeps (1923) – George Morier
- Quicksands (1923) – Col. Patterson
- Racing Hearts (1923) – Silas Martin
- Drifting (1923) – Murphy
- The Age of Desire (1923) – Dan Reagan
- Fashionable Fakers (1923) – Pat O'Donnell
- Fair Week (1924) – Jasper Remus
- The Storm Daughter (1924) – Con Mullaney
- Mademoiselle Midnight (1924) – Duc de Moing (Prologue)
- Western Luck (1924) – 'Chuck' Campbell
- The Signal Tower (1924) – Pete
- The Iron Horse (1924) – Cpl. Casey
- Gerald Cranston's Lady (1924) – Rennie
- Those Who Dare (1924)
- The Brass Bowl (1924) – Hickey
- Let Women Alone (1925) – Commodore John Gordon
- The Scarlet Honeymoon (1925) – Joshua Thorpe
- Lightnin' (1925) – Lemuel Townsend
- The Lucky Horseshoe (1925) – Mack
- Kentucky Pride (1925) – Donovan
- Thank You (1925) – Andy
- The Fighting Heart (1925) – Jerry
- The First Year (1926) – Mr. Barstow
- The Dixie Merchant (1926) – Jean Paul Fippany
- The Shamrock Handicap (1926) – Con O'Shea
- A Trip to Chinatown (1926) – Benjamin Strong
- The Last Frontier (1926) – Wild Bill Hickok
- 3 Bad Men (1926) – Mike Costigan
- The Family Upstairs (1926) – Joe Heller
- The Country Beyond (1926) – Sgt. Cassidy
- Bertha, the Sewing Machine Girl (1926) – Sloan
- The Scarlet Honeymoon (1926)
- Ankles Preferred (1927) – McGuire
- Love Makes 'Em Wild (1927) – W. Barden
- Rich But Honest (1927) – Diamond Jim O'Grady
- Cradle Snatchers (1927) – George Martin
- Colleen (1927) – Mr. O'Flynn
- Paid to Love (1927) – Peter Roberts
- Sunrise: A Song of Two Humans (1927) – The Photographer
- East Side, West Side (1927) – Pug Malone
- The Cohens and the Kellys in Paris (1928) – Patrick Kelly
- Bringing Up Father (1928) – Jiggs
- None but the Brave (1928) – John Craig
- 4 Devils (1928) – The Clown
- Riley the Cop (1928) – James 'Aloysius' Riley
- Strong Boy (1929) – Angus McGregor
- Masked Emotions (1929) – Will Whitten

=== Sound ===
- Abie's Irish Rose (1928) – Patrick Murphy
- In Old Arizona (1928) – Stage Passenger (uncredited)
- Masquerade (1929) – Joe Hickey
- Happy Days (1929) – Train Conductor
- The Painted Angel (1929) – Pa Hudler
- South Sea Rose (1929) – Hackett
- Men Without Women (1930) – Costello
- Song o' My Heart (1930) – Rafferty
- The Girl of the Golden West (1930) – Sonora Slim
- Born Reckless (1930) – Pat O'Toole
- The Truth About Youth (1930) – Colonel Graham
- Other Men's Women (1931) – Peg-Leg
- The Painted Desert (1931) – Jeff Cameron
- The Easiest Way (1931) – Ben
- Woman Hungry (1931) – Buzzard
- The Millionaire (1931) – Dan Lewis
- Too Young to Marry (1931) – Rev. Stump
- The Maltese Falcon (1931) – Det. Sgt. Tom Polhouse
- Sporting Blood (1931) – MacGuire
- The Brat (1931) – Timothy Timson – the Butler
- The Squaw Man (1931) – Big Bill
- The Spirit of Notre Dame (1931) – Coach
- Touchdown (1931) – Pop Stewart
- Under Eighteen (1931) – Pop Evans
- Discarded Lovers (1932) – Chief Sommers
- Hotel Continental (1932) – Detective Martin
- Steady Company (1932) – Hogan
- Probation (1932) – Uncle George
- Scandal for Sale (1932) – Treadway
- The Strange Love of Molly Louvain (1932) – Police Sgt. J.B. Antrim (uncredited)
- Week-End Marriage (1932) – Mr. Davis
- Stranger in Town (1932) – Scout (uncredited)
- Madame Racketeer (1932) – John Adams
- The Vanishing Frontier (1932) – Waco
- The Hurricane Express (1932) – Jim Baker
- The Thirteenth Guest (1932) – Police Capt. Ryan
- The Phantom Express (1932) – D.J. 'Smokey' Nolan
- Hearts of Humanity (1932) – Tom O'Hara
- 70,000 Witnesses (1932) – State Coach
- This Sporting Age (1932) – Jerry O'Day
- Heritage of the Desert (1932) – Adam Naab
- The Pride of the Legion (1932) – Police Chief Scott
- Men Are Such Fools (1932) – Prison Warden Randolph
- Me and My Gal (1932) – Pop Riley
- No Man of Her Own (1932) – 'Dickie' Collins
- The Racing Strain (1932) – Mr. Martin
- The Iron Master (1933) – J.C. Stillman
- The Working Man (1933) – Henry Davis
- Peg o' My Heart (1933) – Patrick Shamus 'Pat' O'Connell
- Laughing at Life (1933) – Prison Warden
- The Power and the Glory (1933) – Mulligan
- I Loved a Woman (1933) – Shuster
- Murder on the Campus (1933) – Police Capt. Ed Kyne
- Myrt and Marge (1933) – Grady
- Under Secret Orders (1933) – John Burke
- Man of Two Worlds (1934) – Michael
- The Crosby Case (1934) – The Doorman—Mike Costello
- The Crime Doctor (1934) – Kemp
- Once to Every Woman (1934) – Flannigan
- She Made Her Bed (1934) – Bookmaker (uncredited)
- The Cat's-Paw (1934) – Shigley
- Beggar's Holiday (1934) – Pop Malloy
- The Best Man Wins (1935) – Captain—Harbor Patrol
- Romance in Manhattan (1935) – Officer Murphy
- Maybe It's Love (1935) – The Cop
- Square Shooter (1935) – Sheriff
- Northern Frontier (1935) – Inspector McKenzie
- The Whole Town's Talking (1935) – Prison Warden (uncredited)
- Star of Midnight (1935) – Police Inspector Doremus
- Swellhead (1935) – Umpire
- Let 'Em Have It (1935) – Mr. Keefer
- Our Little Girl (1935) – Mr. Tramp
- The Healer (1935) – Applejack
- The Arizonian (1935) – Marshal Andy Jordan
- Shadows of the Orient (1935) – Inspector Sullivan
- Front Page Woman (1935) – Hallohan
- Danger Ahead (1935) – Harry Cromwell – City Editor
- The Irish in Us (1935) – Capt. Jackson
- The Farmer Takes a Wife (1935) – (uncredited)
- Waterfront Lady (1935) – Capt. O'Brien
- Stormy (1935) – Trinidad Dorn
- Fighting Youth (1935) – Coach Parker
- Hitch Hike Lady (1935) – Judge Hale
- Riffraff (1936) – 'Brains' McCall
- Exclusive Story (1936) – Michael Devlin
- Florida Special (1936) – Captain Timothy Harrigan
- Show Boat (1936) – Windy McClain
- Mysterious Crossing (1936) – Police Chief Bullock
- Maid of Salem (1937) – Captain of Ship
- The Great Barrier (1937) – Major Rogers
- The Hit Parade (1937) – Sgt. O'Hara
- Parnell (1937) – Irish Laborer (uncredited)
- Slave Ship (1937) – Proprietor
- Slim (1937, Warner Bros) – Pop
- Flying Fists (1937) – Bill 'One-Punch' Fagin
- Roaring Timber (1937) – Andrew MacKinley
- Topper (1937) – Policeman
- My Dear Miss Aldrich (1937) – 'Doc' Howe
- The Game That Kills (1937) – Joe Holland
- County Fair (1937) – Calvin Williams – Julie's Father
- Courage of the West (1937) – Buck Saunders
- My Old Kentucky Home (1938) – Mayor Jim Hopkins
- White Banners (1938) – Dr. Thompson
- State Police (1938) – Charlie Wheeler
- Extortion (1938) – Coach Pearson
- Numbered Woman (1938)
- Barefoot Boy (1938) – Warden
- The Crowd Roars (1938) – Father Ryan
- The Last Express (1938) – William Barton
- There Goes My Heart (1938) – Officer
- Submarine Patrol (1938) – CWO 'Sails' Quincannon
- Gang Bullets (1938) – Chief Reardon
- Come On, Rangers (1938) – Colonel Forbes
- Little Orphan Annie (1938) – 'Pop' Corrigan
- The Lone Ranger Rides Again (1939, Serial) – Craig Dolan
- East Side of Heaven (1939) – Doorman (uncredited)
- Zenobia (1939) – Judge
- Susannah of the Mounties (1939) – Pat O'Hannegan
- Mickey the Kid (1939) – Sheriff J.J. Willoughby
- They Shall Have Music (1939) – Police Chief (uncredited)
- Conspiracy (1939) – Captain of the Falcon
- Coast Guard (1939) – Capt. Hansen (uncredited)
- Full Confession (1939) – Joe, Police Sergeant (uncredited)
- The Housekeeper's Daughter (1939) – Police Captain (uncredited)
- The Gentleman from Arizona (1939) – Wild Bill Coburn
- Knights of the Range (1940) – Cappy
- Dark Command (1940) – Dave
- The Light of Western Stars (1940) – Bill Stillwell
- I Take This Oath (1940) – Insp. Tim Ryan
- Prairie Law (1940) – Sheriff Jim Austin
- The Last Alarm (1940) – Jim Hadley
- Untamed (1940) – Doctor Billar
- Stagecoach War (1940) – Jeff Chapman
- Friendly Neighbors (1940) – Sheiff Potts
- Meet John Doe (1941) – 'Sourpuss'
- In Old Cheyenne (1941) – Tim Casey
- The Great Lie (1941) – Dr. Ferguson
- Broadway Limited (1941) – RR Line Supt. Mulcahey (uncredited)
- Riders of the Timberline (1941) – Jim Kerrigan
- Sullivan's Travels (1941) – Desk Sergeant (uncredited)
- Law of the Timber (1941) – Adams
- Private Snuffy Smith (1942) – General Rosewater
- Wild Bill Hickok Rides (1942) – Judge Henry Hathaway
- Captains of the Clouds (1942) – Dr. Neville
- Reap the Wild Wind (1942) – Port Captain
- One Thrilling Night (1942) – Police Sgt. Haggerty
- Little Tokyo, U.S.A. (1942) – Capt. Wade
- The Palm Beach Story (1942) – Officer O'Donnell (uncredited)
- Phantom Killer (1942) – Police Captain
- Bowery at Midnight (1942) – Capt. Mitchell
- The Living Ghost (1942) – Police Lt. 'Pete' Peterson
- The McGuerins from Brooklyn (1942) – Cop
- The Ape Man (1943) – Police CaptainO'Brien
- Harrigan's Kid (1943) – Frank (uncredited)
- Clancy Street Boys (1943) – Police Sgt. Flanagan
- Tiger Fangs (1943) – Geoffrey MacCardle
- The Miracle of Morgan's Creek (1943) – Sheriff (uncredited)
- True to Life (1943) – Bit Role (uncredited)
- Texas Masquerade (1944) – John Martindale
- Pin Up Girl (1944) – Train Conductor (uncredited)
- Ladies of Washington (1944) – Night Watchman (uncredited)
- Follow the Leader (1944) – Clancy, Policeman
- The Great Moment (1944) – The Priest
- Shadow of Suspicion (1944) – Police Captain Mike Dolan
- Greenwich Village (1944) – Police Officer O'Shea (uncredited)
- Irish Eyes Are Smiling (1944) – Stage Doorman (uncredited)
- Hangover Square (1945) – Street Vendor (uncredited)
- A Tree Grows in Brooklyn (1945) – Carney The Junkman (uncredited)
- Circumstantial Evidence (1945) – Jury Foreman (uncredited)
- Nob Hill (1945) – Cabby with Katie (uncredited)
- The Dolly Sisters (1945) – Opera Stage Doorman (uncredited)
- Johnny Angel (1945) – Capt. Angel
- Fallen Angel (1945) – Bank Guard (uncredited)
- The Woman Who Came Back (1945) – Sheriff
- Pillow of Death (1945) – The Graveyard Sexton (uncredited)
- Pardon My Past (1945) – Policeman (uncredited)
- Behind Green Lights (1946) – O'Malley – Morgue Attendant (uncredited)
- Joe Palooka, Champ (1946) – Long-Count Bowman
- Smoky (1946) – Jim – the Cook
- My Darling Clementine (1946) – Mac the Barman
- It's a Wonderful Life (1946) – Man Whose Grandfather Planted Tree (uncredited)
- The Sin of Harold Diddlebock (1947) – Desk Sergeant (uncredited)
- Web of Danger (1947) – Scotty MacKronish – Bus Driver
- Thunder in the Valley (1947) – McPherson, Innkeeper (uncredited)
- Keeper of the Bees (1947) – Postmaster
- The Bachelor and the Bobby-Soxer (1947) – Mac – Bailiff (uncredited)
- Christmas Eve (1947) – Policeman (uncredited)
- If You Knew Susie (1948) – Police Sergeant (uncredited)
- Panhandle (1948) – Doc Cooper
- Sitting Pretty (1948) – Cop (uncredited)
- Fury at Furnace Creek (1948) – Pops Murphy (uncredited)
- The Walls of Jericho (1948) – Bailiff (uncredited)
- Unfaithfully Yours (1948) – Stage Doorman (uncredited)
- When My Baby Smiles at Me (1948) – Doorman (uncredited)
- Belle Starr's Daughter (1948) – Doc Benson
- Shep Comes Home (1948) – Sheriff Cap Weatherby
- Whispering Smith (1948) – Bill Baggs
- Trouble Preferred (1948) – Apartment House Manager (uncredited)
- Law of the Barbary Coast (1949) – Sergeant O'Leary
- Streets of San Francisco (1949) – Pop Lockhart
- The Beautiful Blonde from Bashful Bend (1949) – Sheriff Sweetser
- You're My Everything (1949) – Doorman (uncredited)
- Sand (1949) – Telegraph Operator (uncredited)
- Fighting Man of the Plains (1949) – Partridge
- The Dalton Gang (1949) – Judge Price
- When Willie Comes Marching Home (1950) – Gilby – Pharmacist (uncredited)
- Dakota Lil (1950) – Ellis
- The Daltons' Women (1950) – Alvin – Stage Company Representative
- Mother Didn't Tell Me (1950) – Train Conductor (uncredited)
- Hostile Country (1950) – Mr. Lane (uncredited)
- Woman on the Run (1950) – Sea Captain
- Mr. Belvedere Rings the Bell (1951) – Mr. Kroeger (uncredited)
- Here Comes the Groom (1951) – Husband on Airplane (uncredited)
- Golden Girl (1951) – Husband (uncredited)
- Superman and the Mole Men (1951) – Pop Shannon
- Elopement (1951) – Mr. Simpson (uncredited) (final film role)
