= Louis F. Gottschalk =

American composer and conductor (1864–1934)

Louis Ferdinand Gottschalk (October 7, 1864 – July 15, 1934) was an American composer and conductor born in St. Louis, Missouri. He studied music in Stuttgart, Kingdom of Württemberg (in present-day Germany), where his father, a judge, was American consul. Louis Moreau Gottschalk was his great-uncle.

== Career ==
He came to attention as conductor of the U.S. premiere of Franz Lehár's The Merry Widow. He was a pioneer of original film music, largely due to his work with independent filmmaker L. Frank Baum, for whom he composed the musical, The Tik-Tok Man of Oz, to Baum's libretto, which producer Oliver Morosco decided not to bring to Broadway after only modest success in Los Angeles. The show ran in 1913 and closed in early 1914, by which time Baum and Gottschalk were discussing getting involved in the nascent film industry that had been springing up in Hollywood, where both had been living at the time.

Baum, as president, with Gottschalk, as vice president, Harry Marston Haldeman as secretary, and Clarence R. Rundel as treasurer, founded The Oz Film Manufacturing Company in 1914 as an outgrowth of Haldeman's men's social group, The Uplifters, which met at the Los Angeles Athletic Club. As co-producer, Gottschalk composed the earliest known feature length film scores for The Patchwork Girl of Oz, The Magic Cloak of Oz, His Majesty, the Scarecrow of Oz, and The Last Egyptian (all 1914), at a time when cue sheets were the norm. He also wrote several stage musicals with Baum for The Uplifters, including Stagecraft, or, The Adventures of a Strictly Moral Man (1914), High Jinks (1914), The Uplift of Lucifer, or Raising Hell: An Allegorical Squazosh (1915), Blackbird Cottages (1916), and The Orpheus Road Show: A Paraphrastic Compendium of Mirth (1917).

After the Oz company dissolved, Gottschalk went on to work with D. W. Griffith, arranging cue sheets for Broken Blossoms (1919) and composing a score for Orphans of the Storm (1921). Other major films for which he contributed scores include The Four Horsemen of the Apocalypse, The Three Musketeers, Little Lord Fauntleroy (all 1921), and Romola (1924). He composed a score for Charles Chaplin's A Woman of Paris (1923), but Chaplin replaced it with a score of his own when Chaplin re-released the film in 1976.

== Death ==
Gottschalk died of a stroke of paralysis at his Los Angeles home on July 16, 1934 at the age of 69.

== Additional works ==
- The Liberty Belles, book and lyrics by Harry B. Smith, music by John W. Bratton, Clifton Crawford, Aimee Lachaume, Harry Von Tilzer, A. Baldwin Sloane, Louis F. Gottschalk, William J. Accooe (1875–1904), and Mae Anwerda Sloane, 1901.
- Cinderella and the Prince, or The Castle of Heart's Desire - A Fairy Excuse for Songs and Dances in 3 Acts, co-composed with Edward W. Carliss, lyrics by D.K. Stevnes and. R.A. Barnett, additional musical numbers by D.J. Sullivan, J. S. Chapman, and D.K. Stevens, White-Smith Music Publishing Company, 1904.

== Broadway conducting credits ==
- The Ameer December 4, 1899 – January 20, 1900
- The Messenger Boy September 16, 1901 – January 4, 1902
- The Toreador January 6, 1902 – May 3, 1902
- Red Feather November 9, 1903 – Apr 1904
- The Cingalee October 24, 1904 – November 19, 1904
- The Gingerbread Man December 25, 1905 – May 26, 1906
- The Rich Mr. Hoggenheimer October 22, 1906 – March 30, 1907
- Dream City December 24, 1906 – March 23, 1907
- The Merry Widow October 21, 1907 – October 17, 1908
- Old Dutch November 22, 1909 – February 5, 1910
- The Red Rose June 22, 1911 – September 1911
- Gypsy Love October 17, 1911 – November 11, 1911
- Modest Suzanne January 1, 1912 – January 20, 1912
- The Century Girl November 6, 1916 – April 28, 1917
