= Captain Thunder (film) =

1930 film

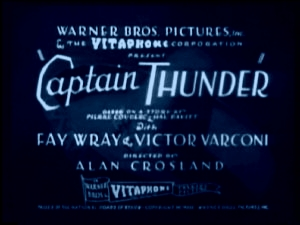
- Directed by: Alan Crosland
- Written by: Gordon Rigby; William K. Wells based on the story by Pierre Couderc; Hal Davitt
- Based on: The Gay Caballero by Pierre Couderc; Hal Davitt
- Starring: Fay Wray; Victor Varconi; Charles Judels; Robert Elliott; Bert Roach; Natalie Moorhead
- Cinematography: James Van Trees
- Edited by: Arthur Hilton
- Music by: Xavier Cugat; David Mendoza; Leon Rosebrook
- Production company: The Vitaphone Corporation
- Distributed by: Warner Bros. Pictures
- Release date: December 27, 1930
- Running time: 65 minutes
- Country: United States
- Language: English

Captain Thunder is a 1930 American pre-Code historical drama Western film that was produced and distributed by Warner Bros. Pictures and released in late 1930. The film was directed by Alan Crosland and stars Victor Varconi in his first full-length all-talking feature. The script is based on the story The Gay Caballero by Pierre Couderc and Hal Davitt.

A copy is preserved at the Library of Congress.

== Plot ==
Captain Thunder (1930)

El Capitan Thunder is a Mexican bandit who brazenly flaunts his ventures until the people of El Paramo demand that something be done about it. Ruiz, the Mexican sheriff, offers a large reward for the capture of El Capitan.

Juan and Ynez, a pair of lovers, wish to marry, but Inez's father prefers a wealthy man named Morgan. When Juan hears about the large reward for El Capitan, he pursues the bandit so that he can claim the reward and become wealthy enough to please Inez's father. Ruiz lights bonfires at points where El Capitan is seen, hoping to capture him.

When El Capitan appears at Inez's hacienda to pay homage to her, she at first lights a bonfire but changes her mind and hides El Capitan from the soldiers when they arrive. At daybreak, Juan captures him and claims his reward.

El Capitan soon escapes from prison, which embarrasses Ruiz. Morgan asks El Capitan to perform a favor that he had previously promised to him. He asks El Capitan to disrupt the wedding plans so that he can marry Inez. Soon after Inez is married by force, a gunshot is heard. Inez returns to the party where El Capitan informs her that she is now a widow and is free to marry Juan.

== Cast ==
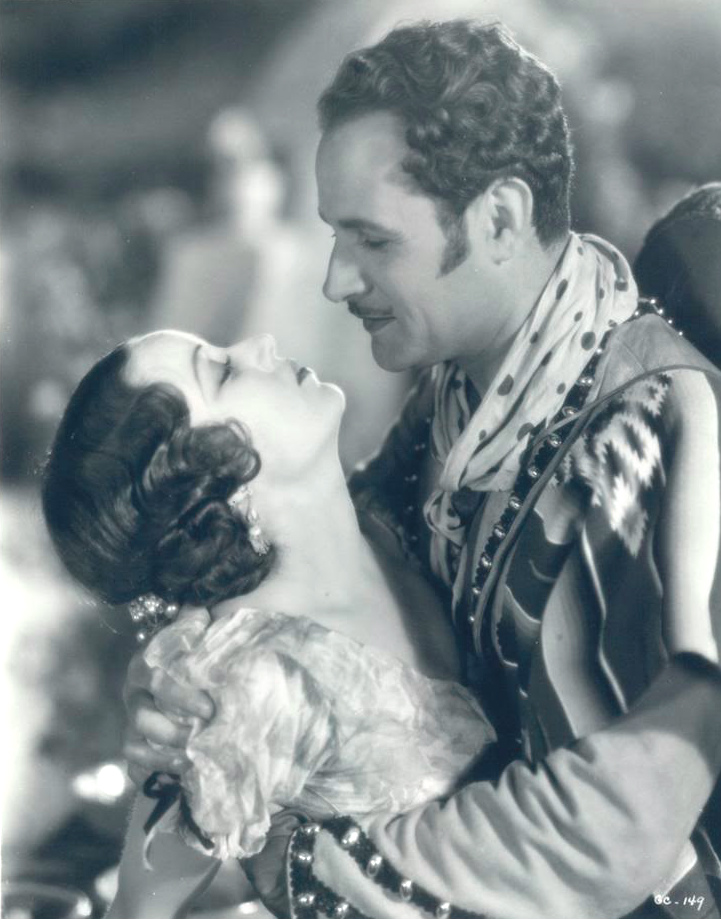
Fay Wray and Victor Varconi in Captain Thunder (1930)

- Victor Varconi as El Capitan Thunder
- Fay Wray as Ynez
- Charles Judels as Commandante Ruiz
- Robert Elliott as Morgan
- Bert Roach as Pablo
- Natalie Moorhead as Bonita
- Frank Campeau as Hank
- Don Alvarado as Juan
- John St. Polis as Pedro
- Robert Emmett Keane as Don Miguel

== Preservation ==
The film survives in its complete form and has been shown on television in various markets.
