= Frank Moore (American actor) =

American actor

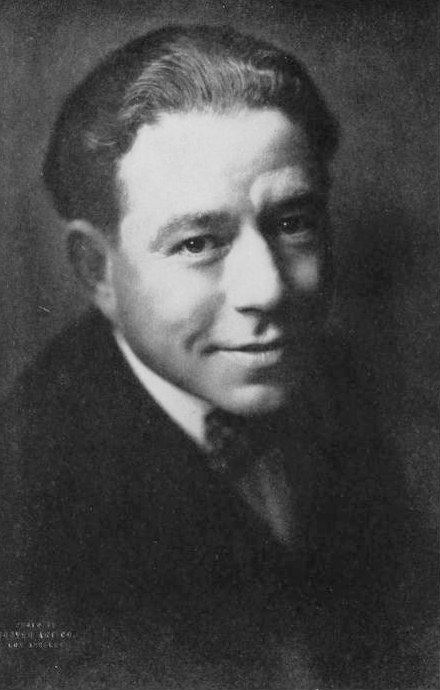
- Born: November 15, 1880; Philadelphia, Pennsylvania; United States
- Died: May 28, 1924 (aged 43); Los Angeles, California; USA
- Occupation: Actor

Frank F. Moore (November 15, 1880 – May 28, 1924) was an American actor during the silent film era.

== Biography ==
Frank Moore was born in Philadelphia in 1880. He was the older brother of vaudeville and Broadway performer Florence Moore. His first acting experience on stage was at the Keith's Theatre in Philadelphia.

Moore appeared in three films with the short-lived The Oz Film Manufacturing Company, all produced in 1914: The Patchwork Girl of Oz, The Magic Cloak of Oz and His Majesty, the Scarecrow of Oz.

Before embarking on a career in films Moore appeared in a vaudeville and burlesque duo, Morton & Moore, with actor James C. Morton playing at the Alhambra Theatre in Harlem and in The Merry Whirl on Broadway in 1910.
