= Queen Zixi of Ix =

1905 novel by L. Frank Baum

Queen Zixi of Ix, or The Story of the Magic Cloak
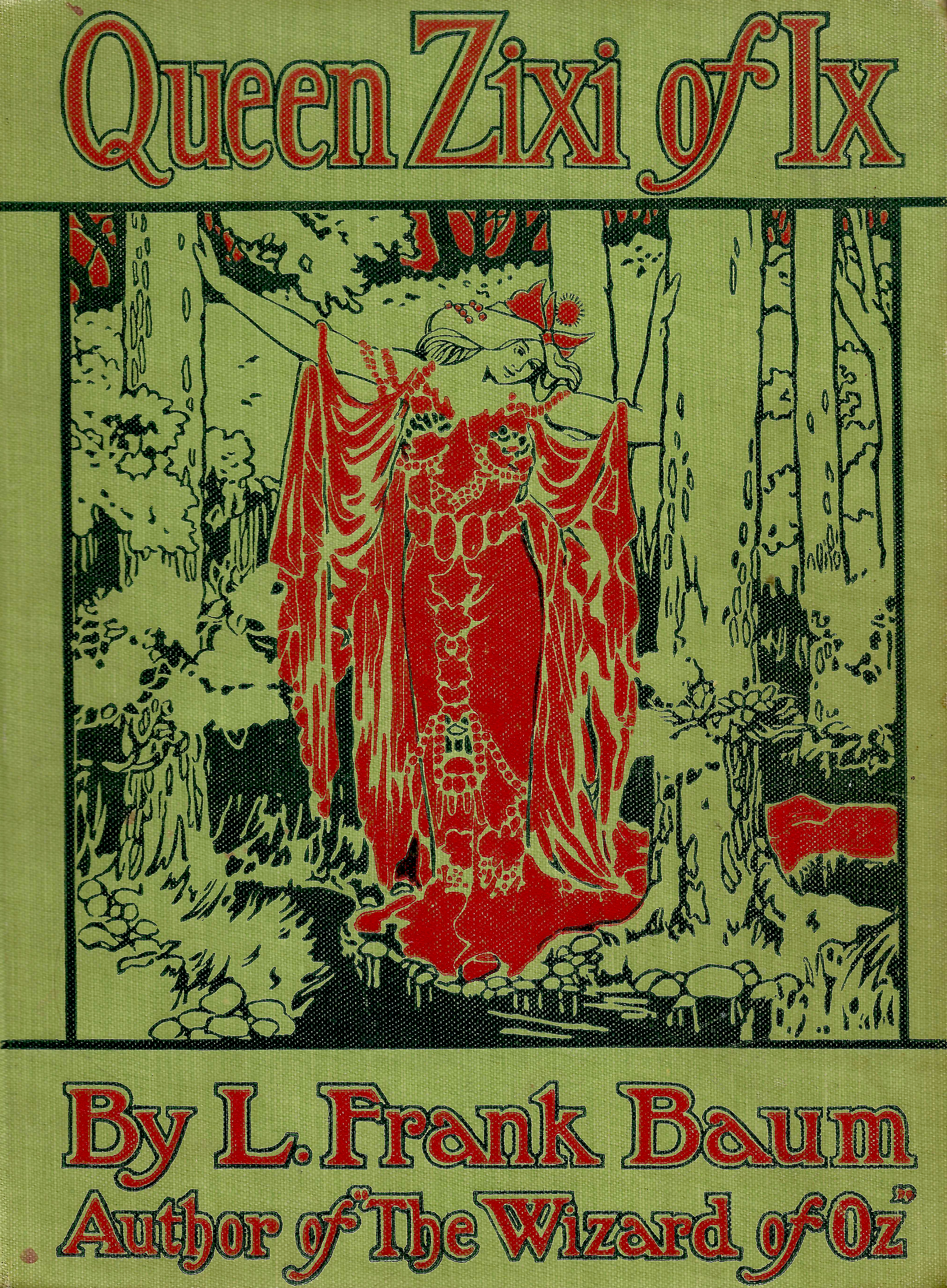
- First edition cover of Queen Zixi of Ix
- Author: L. Frank Baum
- Illustrator: Frederick Richardson
- Language: English
- Series: Oz books
- Genre: Children's fantasy
- Set in: Ix, Noland, Forest of Burzee
- Publisher: St. Nicholas; The Century Company (book)
- Publication date: November 1904 – October 1905
- Publication place: United States
- Media type: Print (Serial)

Queen Zixi of Ix, or The Story of the Magic Cloak, is a children's book written by L. Frank Baum and illustrated by Frederick Richardson. It was originally serialized in the early 20th-century American children's magazine St. Nicholas from November 1904 to October 1905, and was published in book form later in 1905 by The Century Company. The events of the book alternate between Noland and Ix, two neighboring regions to the Land of Oz. Baum himself commented this was the best book he had yet written. In a letter to his eldest son, Frank Joslyn Baum, he said it was "nearer to the 'old-fashioned' fairy tale than anything I have yet accomplished," and in many respects, it adheres more closely to the fairy tale structure than the Oz books.

The book was made into the 1914 film The Magic Cloak of Oz. Although no part of the book's story takes place in the Land of Oz, by the time the movie was made, it had become clear that the Oz franchise was Baum's most popular creation.

The copyright to Queen Zixi of Ix was acquired by Dover Publications in 1971, and the book was re-released with its original illustrations and a new introduction by Martin Gardner (ISBN 0-486-22691-3). Like all books published in the U.S. before 1923, it is now in the public domain.

== Plot ==
On the night of a full moon, the fairies ruled by Queen Lulea have gathered in the Forest of Burzee.To divert themselves, the fairies decide to make a magic cloak that can grant its wearer one wish. The fairy who proposed it, Espa, and Queen Lulea agree that such a cloak will benefit mortals greatly. Its wish-granting power cannot be used if the cloak is stolen from its previous wearer. After the fairies finish the golden cloak, Ereol arrives from the kingdom of Noland whose king has just died. On the advice of the Man in the Moon, Ereol is dispatched to Noland to give the magic cloak to the first unhappy person she meets.

Meanwhile, Noland, the king has died. The high counselors learn that the forty-seventh person to pass through Nole's eastern gate at sunrise is to be declared monarch. The next day, the counselors assemble at the eastern gate and count off the procession entering Nole. Number forty-seven turns out to be Timothy (who everyone calls "Bud"), the orphaned son of a ferryman who, with his sister Meg (nicknamed "Fluff"), is entering town with their stern Aunt Rivette, a laundress for the city of Nole. Along the way from their house to Nole, Ereol meets Fluff and gives her the magic cloak due to her unhappiness at Bud's ill treatment by Rivette. The power of the cloak is first seen when Fluff wishes she could be happy again, and she becomes so. Bud—now King Bud—is welcomed by the high counselors and the people of Nole as their new king. His sister Fluff becomes Princess Fluff, and they take residence in the royal palace.

Aunt Rivette is relegated to an upper room of the palace. While Bud and Fluff glory in their new positions of authority and their possessions, Aunt Rivette wants to spread the news of her good fortune to her friends. She asks Fluff if she can wear her cloak, and she becomes so tired walking that she wishes she could fly. A pair of wings sprout from Aunt Rivette's back, causing her to panic at first, but she soon becomes skilled at using them. On its way back to the Princess, the cloak passes through the hands of the king's counselors and the king's valet, each of whom have their wishes immediately granted.

The minstrel Quavo crosses from Noland to Ix, whose witch-queen ruler Zixi learns of the magic cloak and seeks to use it to make her reflection in a mirror as beautiful as she has made herself. Zixi is 683 years old, but her magic has allowed her to appear sixteen; however, the queen's reflection appears as old as she truly is. Believing that Princess Fluff would not give her the cloak to use since Ix and Noland aren't on speaking terms, Queen Zixi disguises herself and opens a school for witchery in Noland. Princess Fluff arrives as one of the pupils in her second-best cloak; Zixi is discovered to be a would-be thief when she demands the Princess wear the other, magic cloak. Zixi leads the royal army of Ix to conquer Noland, but the counselors use their wish-granted abilities to repel the invaders back across the mountains.

Zixi disguises herself for a second time and arrives at the royal palace of Noland to be hired as a serving maid to Princess Fluff. While alone in the Princess' chamber, Zixi summons imps to replace the real magic cloak with a fake one. When Zixi tries to use the real cloak, its power fails because she had stolen it. She leaves the cloak in the forest. After a number of chance encounters, she realizes has been foolish to be unhappy with her lot.

The ball-shaped Roly-Rogues live on a plateau above Noland and Ix. They decide to conquer Noland rather than constantly fight among themselves. Even with their wish-granted abilities, King Bud's counselors and Nole are soon overwhelmed by the invaders. King Bud, Princess Fluff, Aunt Rivette, and lord high steward Tallydab escape and plan to retrieve the magic cloak which they believe is in the palace. Aunt Rivette carries Bud and Fluff to the palace and they battle past the Roly-Rogues, but when Bud puts on the cloak (he had saved his wish for later) and wishes the Roly-Rogues away, nothing happens. Caught aback, Aunt Rivette takes her niece and nephew back to Ix.

Queen Zixi, who confesses to Princess Fluff that she stole the real magic cloak, promises that she will let her use it after the Roly-Rogues are defeated. When they arrive at the forest to find the lock, it's gone. The party mounts a search to find it. The cloak was found by Edi, a shepherd who took it to Dame Dingle, a local seamstress. The seamstress reveals that she cut the cloak in half, used one half, and gave the other away. Zixi, Bud, Fluff, Rivette, Tallydab, and Ruffles track down the remaining pieces of the cloak, but one part was given away as a necktie to a seaman who won't return for a year.

Without the complete cloak, Bud can't wish the Roly-Rogues away. Queen Zixi uses the contents of a Silver Vial mixed in with their soup to put the Roly-Gogues to sleep, so the army can sent them home. King Bud and his allies retake Noland, and the lands of Noland and Ix declare lasting friendship between them.

The fairies later take the cloak back as it has caused too much trouble. Lulea will not grant Zixi's wish to see her own beauty, because the fairies do not approve of those who practice witchcraft. Queen Zixi returns to her kingdom, to rule it with kindness and justice—but, with her wish unfulfilled, must always beware of a mirror.

== Setting ==
Ix
- The Oz series location
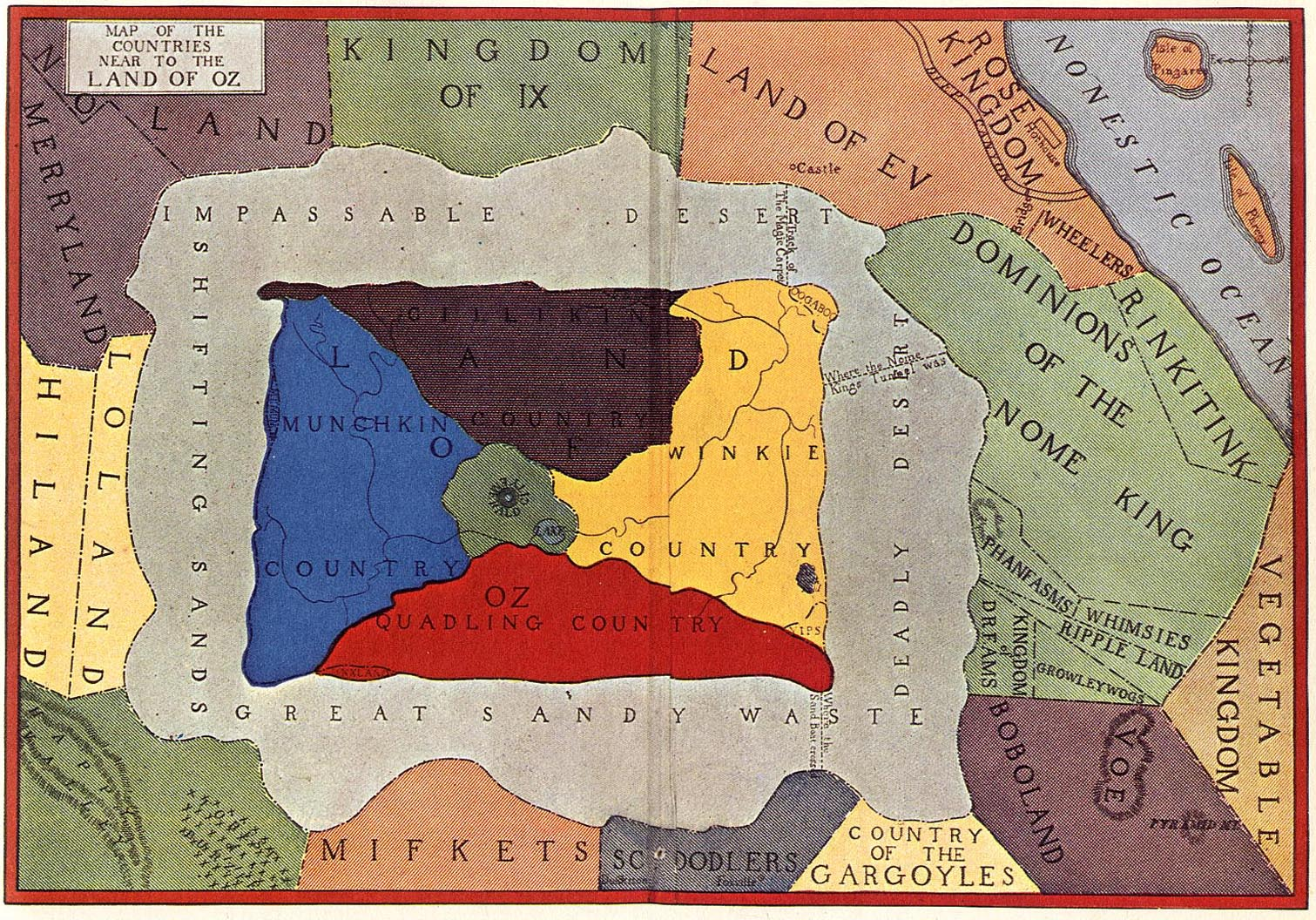
- Location of Ix (top center)

- Flag of Ix
- First appearance: Queen Zixi of Ix
- Created by: L. Frank Baum
- Genre: Children's fantasy

In-universe information
- Other name: Kingdom of Ix
- Type: Fairy country
- Ruled by: Queen Zixi
- Ethnic groups: Ixeys, Boxers
- Location: Nonestica
- Locations: Boxwood
- Character: Chief Chillywalla of Boxwood

Noland
- The Oz series location
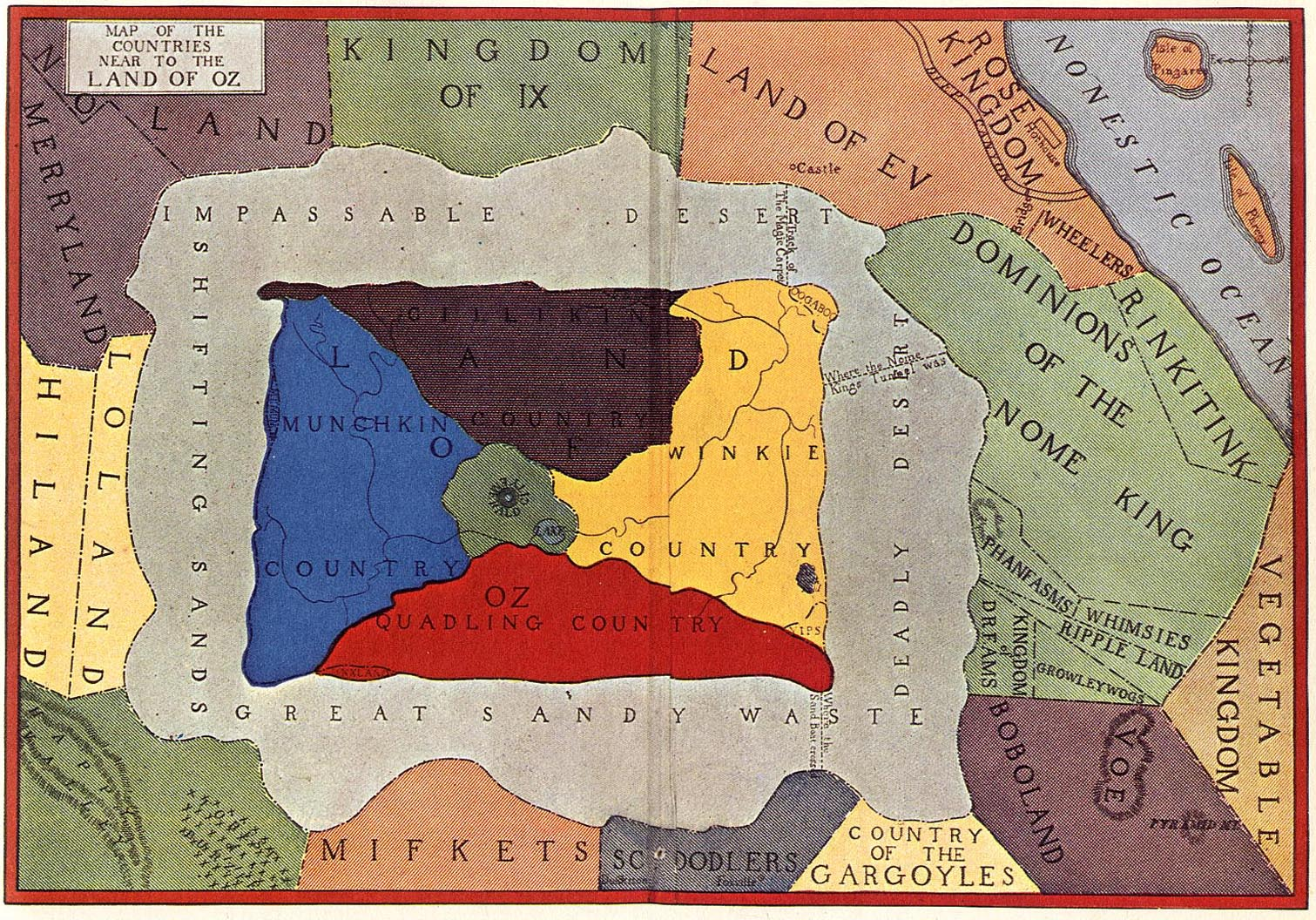
- Location of Noland (top left)
- First appearance: Queen Zixi of Ix
- Created by: L. Frank Baum
- Genre: Children's fantasy

In-universe information
- Other name: Kingdom of Noland
- Type: Fairy country
- Ruled by: King Bud
- Location: Nonestica
- Locations: Nole (capital)
- Characters: Princess Fluff, Aunt Rivette

The story takes place in the two kingdoms of Noland and Ix, which Baum places across the Impassable Desert to the north of the Land of Oz.

== Film adaptation ==
In 1914, the Oz Film Manufacturing Company produced a five-reel feature film version of Queen Zixi of Ix titled The Magic Cloak of Oz. The initial distributor of the film, Paramount Pictures, backed out because of poor results from an earlier Oz film, The Patchwork Girl of Oz. The Magic Cloak of Oz was released by the National Film Corporation in 1917.

== Audio adaptation ==
Ray Bolger recorded an audio adaptation of Queen Zixi of Ix. This was the second in a series of four audiotapes, The Oz Audio Collection, recorded by Bolger and issued by Caedmon Audio from 1976-1983.

== Other notes ==
King Bud, Princess Fluff, and Queen Zixi also appear in Baum's fifth Oz book, The Road to Oz. Here, the Wizard of Oz refers to Queen Zixi as having lived thousands of years.

Ix was later visited in The Silver Princess in Oz by Ruth Plumly Thompson, where it is home to Chief Chillywalla of Boxwood and his subjects, the Boxers, who box up everything, including their own bodies down to individual features. Zixi does not appear in the story. Kabumpo says there is no time to meet Queen "Zixie" [sic].
