= American Fairy Tales =

1901 collection of twelve fantasy stories by L. Frank Baum

- First edition
- Author: L. Frank Baum
- Illustrator: Norman P. Hall; Harry Kennedy; Ike Morgan; Ralph Fletcher Seymour
- Language: English
- Genre: Fantasy; Humor
- Publisher: George M. Hill Company
- Publication date: 1901
- Publication place: United States
- Media type: Print (hardcover)

American Fairy Tales is the title of a collection of twelve fantasy stories by L. Frank Baum, published in 1901 by the George M. Hill Company, the firm that issued The Wonderful Wizard of Oz the previous year. The cover, title page, and page borders were designed by Ralph Fletcher Seymour; each story was furnished with two full-page black-and-white illustrations, by either Harry Kennedy, Ike Morgan, or Norman P. Hall.

== Background ==
L. Frank Baum was doing well in 1901, better than ever before in his life. He had written two popular books, Father Goose: His Book and The Wonderful Wizard of Oz, and was determined to capitalize on this success. In addition to American Fairy Tales, Baum's Dot and Tot of Merryland and The Master Key appeared in 1901.

Publisher George M. Hill sold the serialization rights to the twelve stories in AFT to five major newspapers, the Pittsburgh Dispatch, The Boston Post, The Cincinnati Enquirer, the St. Louis Republic, and The Chicago Chronicle. The stories appeared between March 3 and May 19, 1901; the book followed in October. The first three papers used or adapted the book's illustrations for their publications of the stories, while the Chronicle and the Republic had their own staff artists do separate pictures.

== Book design ==
The first edition of AFT had an unusual and striking design: each page was furnished with a broad illustrated border done in pen-and-ink by Seymour, which took up more than half the surface of the page, like a medieval illuminated manuscript. This probably reflected the influence of the medieval-revival book designs produced in the late nineteenth century by William Morris at his Kelmscott Press.

== The stories ==
The twelve stories were published in this order in the first edition.

1. "The Box of Robbers." Illustrated by Ike Morgan.
2. "The Glass Dog." Illustrated by Harry Kennedy.
3. "The Queen of Quok." Morgan.
4. "The Girl Who Owned a Bear." Kennedy.
5. "The Enchanted Types." Morgan.
6. "The Laughing Hippopotamus." Morgan.
7. "The Magic Bon Bons." Morgan.
8. "The Capture of Father Time." Kennedy.
9. "The Wonderful Pump." The single story illustrated by N. P. Hall.
10. "The Dummy That Lived." Morgan.
11. "The King of the Polar Bears." Morgan.
12. "The Mandarin and the Butterfly." Morgan.

The stories, as critics have noted, lack the high-fantasy aspect of many other Baum works. With ironic or nonsensical morals attached to their ends, their tone is more satirical, glib, and tongue-in-cheek than is usual in children's stories; the serialization in newspapers for adult readers was appropriate for the materials. "The Magic Bon Bons" was the most popular of the tales, judging by number of reprints.

Two of the stories, "The Enchanted Types" and "The Dummy That Lived," employ Knooks and Ryls, the fairies that Baum would use in The Life and Adventures of Santa Claus the next year, 1902. "The Dummy That Lived" depends upon the idea of a department-store mannequin brought to life, an early expression of an idea that would be re-used by many later writers in television and films.

(Baum's story "The Runaway Shadows," published in newspapers in June 1901, was intended to be part of the collection, but was dropped prior to publication of the book.)

== Later editions ==
Bobbs-Merrill, the firm that bought the rights to Baum's books when George M. Hill went out of business in February 1902, published a second edition of AFT in 1908, with a new cover and sixteen two-color illustrations by George Kerr to replace the originals by Morgan, Kennedy, and Hall. This second edition also added an Author's Note by Baum and three more stories—"The Strange Adventures of an Egg," "The Ryl," and "The Witchcraft of Mary-Marie." A third edition that appeared c. 1923–24 dropped half the color illustrations; this edition kept the book in print as late as 1942. The order was shuffled, and ends with "King of the Polar Bears."

In 1997, a limited edition of 350 copies was published as Baum's American Fairy Tales by Books of Wonder in New York with new illustrations by George O'Connor.

In 1978 a facsimile version of the 1901 first edition was published by Dover Publications in New York with an introduction by Martin Gardner which featured the original illustrations. This version was described as: "An unabridged and unaltered republication of the work first published by the George M. Hill Company, Chicago, in 1901."

== Adaptations ==
Baum adapted "The Box of Robbers" and "The Magic Bon Bons" as chapters 1 and 3 of his lost film series, Violet's Dreams, both with Violet MacMillan in the role of child protagonist. The former was retitled A Box of Bandits for film.

Baum worked on a stage version of "The Glass Dog," but it was not produced and may not have been completed. In 2008, "The Glass Dog" was adapted for the fifteenth issue of Graphic Classics by Antonella Caputo and Brad Teare.
