= Fred Woodward (actor) =

Canadian actor

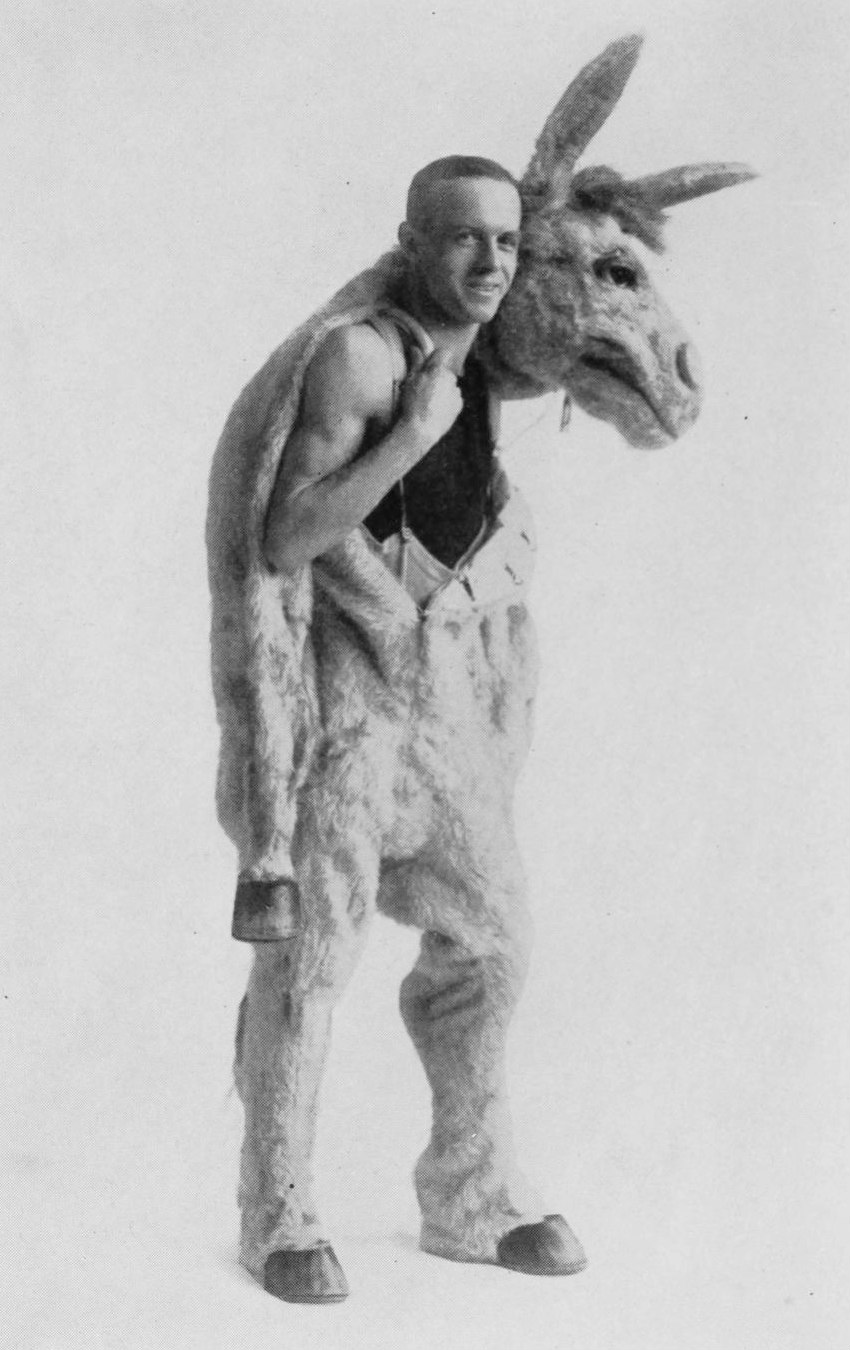
- Woodward in a costume portraying a donkey.
- Born: April 26, 1882; Toronto, Ontario; Canada
- Died: March 26, 1960 (aged 77); Victoria, British Columbia; Canada
- Occupation: Actor

Fred J. Woodward (April 26, 1882 – March 26, 1960) was a Canadian actor and animal impersonator during the silent film era who specialized in playing animal parts.

== Biography ==
Woodward appeared in three films with the short-lived The Oz Film Manufacturing Company, all produced in 1914: The Patchwork Girl of Oz, The Magic Cloak of Oz and His Majesty, the Scarecrow of Oz. Before embarking on a film career Woodward appeared as a vaudeville actor with the Orpheum Circuit in roles portraying the "Teddy Bear" and the "Parrot". From 1909–1911 he played different animal parts with the Ziegfeld Follies including the "Ostrich", the "Jackass", the Frog, Stork and the Owl, and the G. O. P. Elephant. He later appeared at Weber & Fields in Roly Poly playing an alligator.

In 1913 Woodward moved to Los Angeles to appear in Oliver Morosco's musical play The Tik-Tok Man of Oz in which he played the role of Hank the Mule.

Woodward was born in Toronto in 1882 and died in Victoria on the Canadian West Coast in 1960 at an age of 77.

== Filmography and roles ==
- The Patchwork Girl of Oz (1914) – The Woozy, a Quaintness / The Zoop, A Mystery / Mewel, who is Everybody's Friend
- The Magic Cloak of Oz (1914) – Nickodemus the Mule
- His Majesty, the Scarecrow of Oz (1914) – The Cowardly Lion / The Kangaroo / The Crow / The Cow / The Mule
- The Last Egyptian (1914) – Sebbet, the Embalmer
- Violet's Dreams (1915) (a set of four short films)
  - A Box of Bandits
  - The Country Circus – Circus Animals
  - In Dreamy Jungletown
  - The Magic Bon Bons
- Mule Mates (1917) – The Mule
- Like Babes in the Woods (1917) – Hank the Mule
