= His Majesty, the Scarecrow of Oz =

His Majesty, The Scarecrow of Oz
- His Majesty, the Scarecrow of Oz 1960s 16mm print
- Directed by: J. Farrell MacDonald
- Written by: L. Frank Baum
- Produced by: L. Frank Baum; Louis F. Gottschalk
- Starring: Violet MacMillan; Frank Moore; Raymond Russell; Pierre Couderc; Fred Woodward; Mildred Harris; J. Charles Haydon; Mai Wells
- Cinematography: James A. Crosby
- Music by: Louis F. Gottschalk
- Production company: The Oz Film Manufacturing Company
- Distributed by: Alliance Program
- Release date: October 14, 1914
- Running time: 59 minutes (5 reels)
- Country: United States
- Language: Silent (English intertitles)

His Majesty, the Scarecrow of Oz is a 1914 American silent fantasy adventure film directed by J. Farrell MacDonald, and written and produced by L. Frank Baum. It stars Violet MacMillan, Frank Moore, Vivian Reed, Todd Wright, Pierre Couderc, Raymond Russell, and Fred Woodward.

The film had a troubled distribution history; it opened on September 28, 1914, to little success, though it was received as well above average fare by critics of the time. Early in 1915, it was reissued under the title The New Wizard of Oz and was slightly more successful.

The film is loosely based on Baum's 1900 book The Wonderful Wizard of Oz, but in the screenplay, Baum introduced many new characters and a large new story that later became the basis for the 1915 book The Scarecrow of Oz. Similar to The Wonderful Wizard of Oz, the Scarecrow's origin is revealed, although his life is now attributed to "the Spirit of the Corn", who appears as a conventional Hollywood depiction of a Native American.

This was the third film by the Oz Film Manufacturing Company, following The Patchwork Girl of Oz and The Magic Cloak of Oz.

Some elements, such as the villain King Krewl, were reworked into the 1925 silent film of The Wizard of Oz, where he is renamed Prime Minister Kruel.

== Plot ==
King Krewl (Raymond Russell) is a cruel dictator in the Emerald City in the Land of Oz. He wishes to marry off his niece, Princess Gloria (Vivian Reed), to an old courtier named Googly-goo (Arthur Smollett), but she is in love with Pon, a Gardener's boy (Todd Wright). Krewl employs the Wicked Witch named Old Mombi (Mai Wells), to freeze the heart of Gloria so she will not love Pon any longer. This she does by pulling out her heart (which looks somewhere between a valentine and a bland representation of a heart without any vessels) and coating it with ice. Meanwhile, a lost little girl from Kansas named Dorothy Gale (Violet MacMillan) is captured by Mombi and imprisoned in her castle. However, Dorothy runs away with the now heartless Gloria, accompanied by Pon, and they eventually meet the Scarecrow (Frank Moore). Mombi catches up with the travelers and removes the Scarecrow's stuffing, but Dorothy and Pon are able to re-stuff him; Gloria abandons them and wanders off.

They meet the lost little boy, Button Bright (Mildred Harris). The party travels to the Winkie Country next and arrive at the Tin Castle of the Tin Woodman (Pierre Couderc), who has rusted solid. Mombi reaches the Tin Castle, and the Tin Woodman chops off her head. However, this merely slows her down as she hunts for it and places it back on. Having replaced her head, Mombi encounters Pon and turns him into a kangaroo.

Dorothy, Button Bright, the Scarecrow and the Tin Woodman escape from Mombi by crossing a river on a raft. But the Scarecrow's barge-pole gets stuck in the river bed and leaves him stranded, until he is rescued by a bird. At one point in this sequence, the Scarecrow slides down the pole into the river, resulting in a brief "underwater" sequence featuring puppet fish and a mermaid; throughout, the Scarecrow makes asides to the camera, mostly without [intertitles].

The party encounter the Wizard (J. Charles Haydon), who tricks Mombi by letting the group hide in the Red Wagon, pulled by the sawhorse; when Mombi attempts to follow them, the group escape out the back of the wagon. The four companions meet the Cowardly Lion, who joins them. The Wizard traps Mombi in a container of "Preserved Sandwitches" and paints out the "sand" and the plural, carrying her away in his pocket. The Scarecrow, taking a barrage of arrows, tosses Krewl's soldiers over the battlements to deal with the Cowardly Lion, who cannot climb the rope ladder over the city wall. With the support of the people, the Scarecrow is easily able to depose King Krewl. The Wizard releases Mombi, and compels her to restore Pon to his normal form and unfreeze Gloria's Heart.

== Cast ==
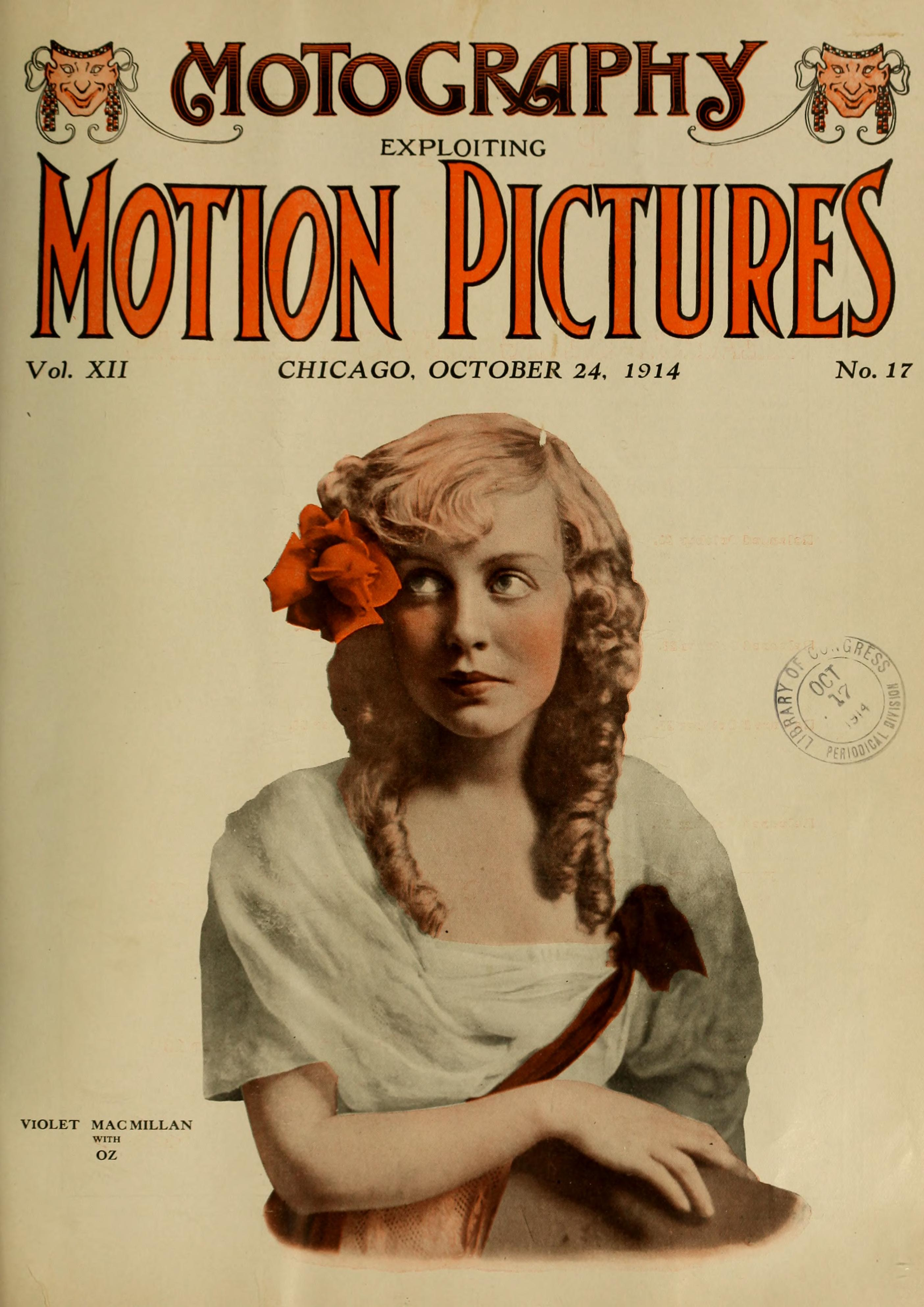
Motography cover depicting Dorothy actress, Violet MacMillan

- Violet MacMillan as Dorothy Gale
- Frank Moore as The Scarecrow
- Pierre Couderc as The Tin Woodman
- Fred Woodward as The Cowardly Lion / The Kangaroo / The Crow / The Cow / The Mule
- Raymond Russell as King Krewl
- Arthur Smollet as Googly-Goo
- J. Charles Haydon as The Wizard of Oz (credited as J. Charles Hayden)
- Todd Wright as Pon
- Vivian Reed as Princess Gloria
- Mai Wells as Old Mombi (credited as Mae Wells)
- Mildred Harris as Button-Bright
- Louise Emmons

== Damage history ==
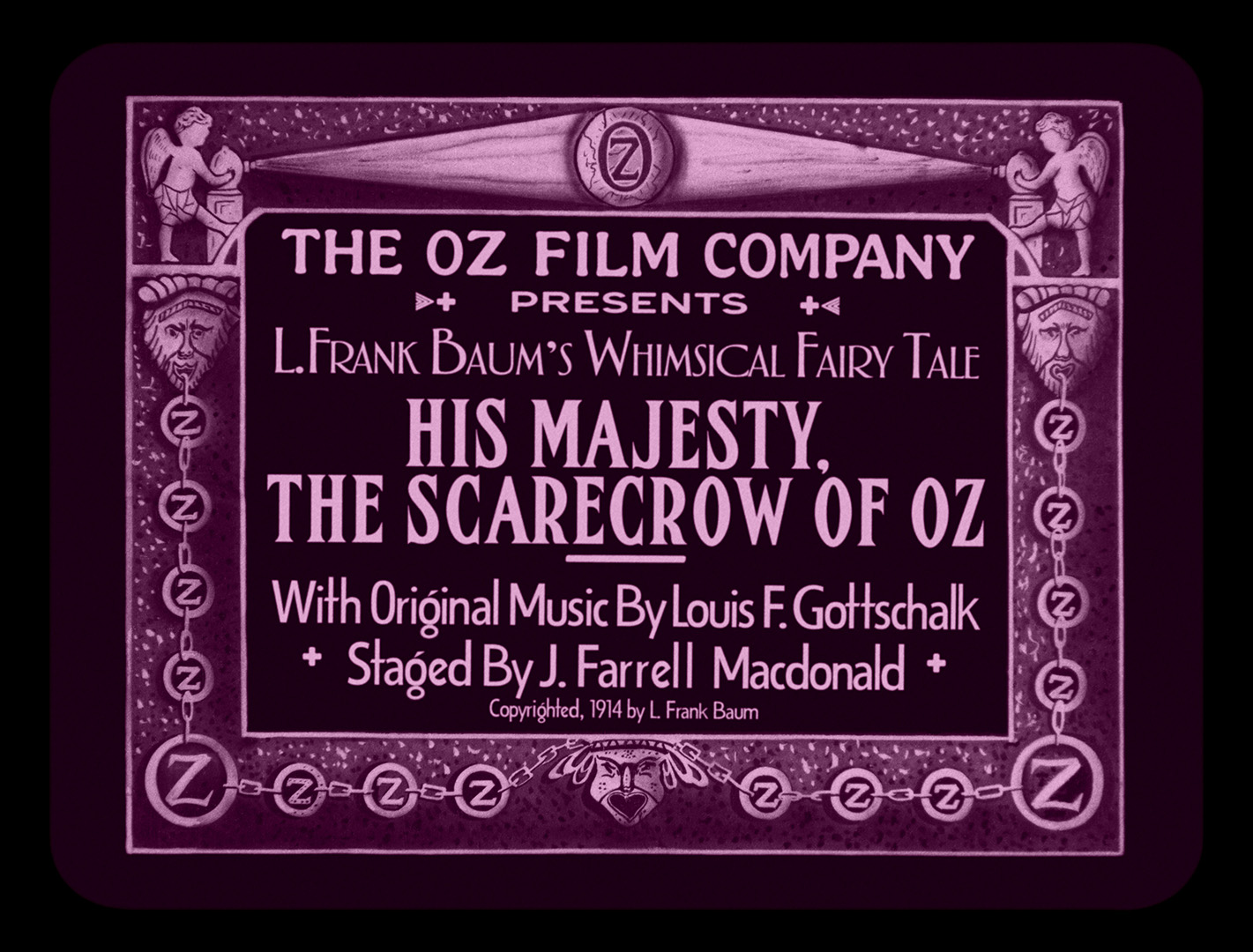
Main title card from the 2024 restoration of His Majesty, The Scarecrow of Oz

The opening reel was lost for many years. While it was eventually recovered in the 1990s, it did not contain the opening titles; Dick Martin's titles, designed in the 1960s, continued to be used, which falsely stated that Baum was the director of the film, misspelled Mai Wells' name, and left out Smollett's and Haydon's credits entirely.

In September 2024 Nate Barlow premiered a restored version of the film at the CharlOz festival in Charlotte, North Carolina, reconstructed from fresh 4K transfers of three partial 35mm prints: two reels of safety positive, three reels of the tinted Moovical print, and two reels of original picture negative, not known to exist until Barlow rediscovered them at the Library of Congress. Among other changes, Barlow has recreated the main titles more inline with the style of the Oz Film Manufacturing Company's other films than the Martin titles.

The newly restored film is now being brought on a roadshow to theaters worldwide (the film played at the Art Theatre in Long Beach, California during Memorial Day Weekend 2025).
