= Cinderella and the Prince, or The Castle of Heart's Desire =

1904 musical

Cinderella and the Prince, or The Castle of Heart's Desire - A Fairy Excuse for Songs and Dances in 3 Acts is a musical with music by Louis F. Gottschalk and Edward W. Carliss, lyrics by D.K. Stevens, and R.A. Barnett, and additional musical numbers by D.J. Sullivan, J. S. Chipman, and D.K. Stevens. It was published by White-Smith Music Publishing Company of Boston in 1904. The musical was first staged in Boston at the Majestic Theatre in 1904 in a production produced by Robert Barnet.

== Songs ==
- "Katy Didn't" (Gottschalk)
- "Oh Miss White" (Sullivan)
- "Cinderella" (Corliss)
- "Mannie Hadn't Been, You Know, Very Long in Town" (Gottschalk)
- "Dottie's Dimples" (Chipman)
- "Send Me, Love, a Postal Card" (Corliss)
