= Violet MacMillan =

American actress (1887–1953)

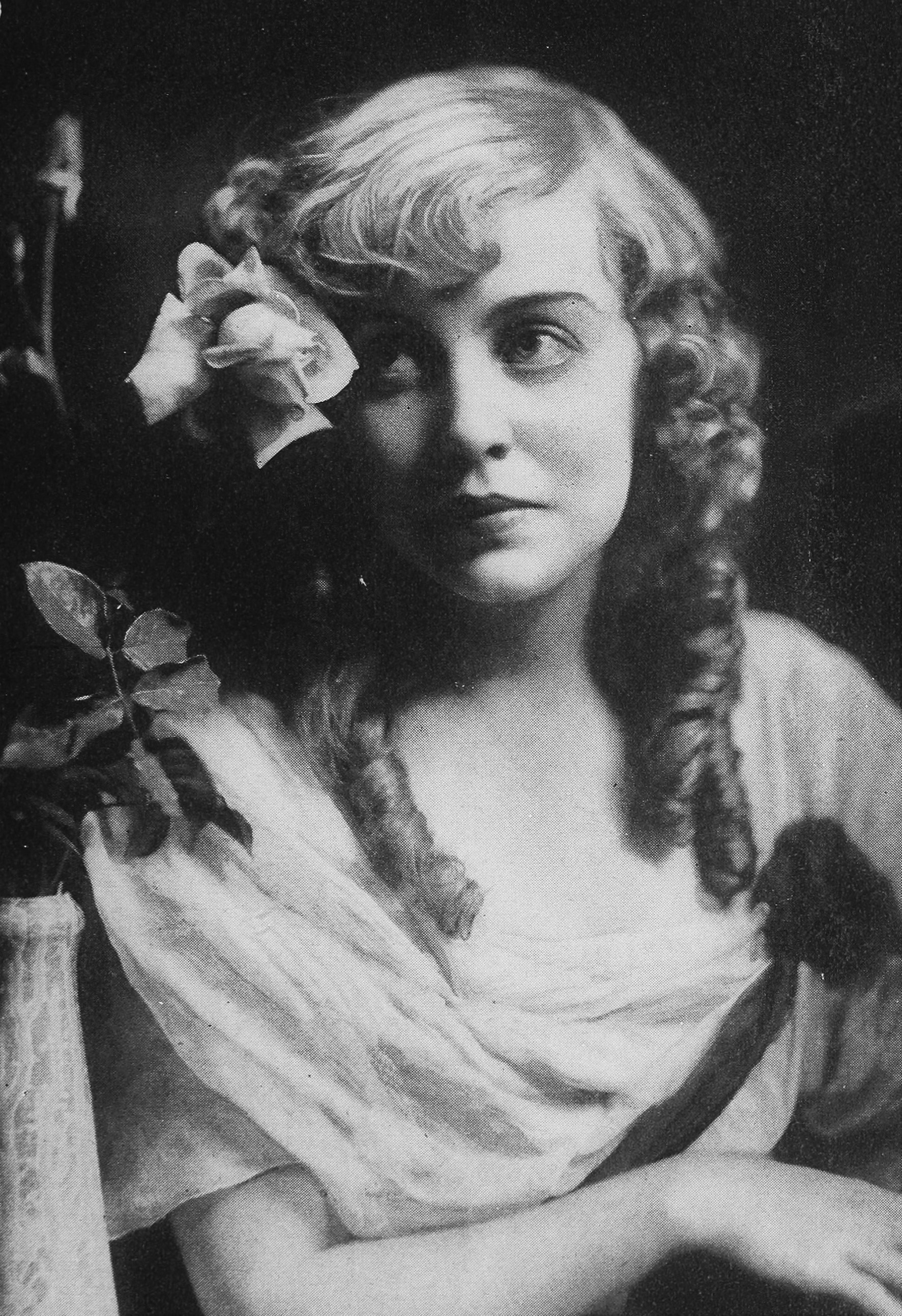
- Motion Picture Magazine, 1915
- Born: March 4, 1887; Grand Rapids, Michigan, U.S.
- Died: December 28, 1953 (aged 66); Grand Rapids, Michigan, U.S.
- Years active: 1908–1922
- Spouse: John H. Folger

Violet MacMillan (March 4, 1887 – December 28, 1953), was an American actress in Broadway theatre productions, vaudeville, and silent films.

== Early career ==
MacMillan gained fame as the "Cinderella Girl" in a contest to discover a woman with feet small enough to wear a petite golden slipper. She was hesitant but entered a Broadway show, and won. Her foot measured an 11½ children's size.

== Theatrical actress ==
Soon she had a leading part in the original production of the musical, The Time, The Place and The Girl. While engaged in this play, in the 1908 season, the actress had surgery at Harper Hospital, Detroit, Michigan.

She completed a successful vaudeville tour in 1916. She participated in the stage production, The Wishing Slippers, at Universal City, California. Another play of note is In And Out of the Movies. She performed in this "vaudeville oddity" in the Midwest in late 1917.

== Silent films ==
His Majesty, the Scarecrow of Oz

In motion pictures Miss MacMillan joined the stock company of The Oz Film Manufacturing Company and debuted in the film versions of His Majesty, the Scarecrow of Oz (as Dorothy Gale), The Patchwork Girl of Oz (as Ojo), and The Magic Cloak of Oz (as King Bud of Noland), all made in 1914, and the lost series of L. Frank Baum-written and produced shorts, Violet's Dreams, in which she played a girl named Claribel who had fairy-tale adventures in her dreams.

She was also an actress for Universal Pictures. She made twenty-six motion pictures, ending with the role of Violet Bronson in The Mystery Mind (1920), a 15-chapter serial about a Satanic cult in lost Atlantis. Among her co-stars in films were Lon Chaney, Blanche Ring, Trixie Friganza, and Julian Eltinge.

MacMillan retired from show business in 1922.

== Personal life and death ==
As Mrs. John H. Folger, she was the wife of an industrial executive, who became her press agent in entertainment.

She was a member of Zonta International, the Grand Rapids Club, a non-profit organization working to advance the status of women through service and advocacy worldwide. She also served as president of the Grand Rapids Club from 1930–1932.

Violet MacMillan, at age 66, died at her home in Grand Rapids on December 28, 1953.
