= J. Charles Haydon =

American film director

James Charles Haydon
- Born: March 27, 1875; Frederick, Maryland, U.S.
- Died: October 15, 1943 (aged 68); Baltimore, Maryland, U.S.
- Occupations: Film director Actor; Screenwriter
- Years active: 1912-1920

James Charles Haydon (March 27, 1875 – October 15, 1943) was an American film director, actor and screenwriter of the silent film era. He directed twelve films between 1914 and 1920. He also appeared in five films between 1912 and 1914. He played the Wizard in His Majesty, the Scarecrow of Oz. He was born in Frederick, Maryland and died in Baltimore, Maryland.

== Filmography ==
=== Director ===
Year	Title
1915	The Alster Case
1916	The Strange Case of Mary Page
1916	The Phantom Buccaneer
1920	Dr. Jekyll and Mr. Hyde

=== Actor ===
Year	Title	Role	Notes
1913	The Sea Wolf	Mugridge	
1914	Burning Daylight: The Adventures of 'Burning Daylight' in Alaska	Elijah	
1914	His Majesty, the Scarecrow of Oz	The Wizard of Oz	credited as J Charles hayden
1914	The Last Egyptian	Tadros, the Dragoman	(final film role)
