= Pierre Couderc =

French screenwriter

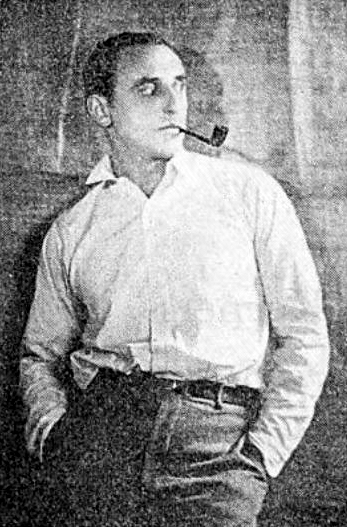
- Born: 18 November 1896; Paris, France
- Died: 6 October 1966 (aged 69); Santa Monica, California, US
- Occupations: Screenwriter, actor
- Years active: 1914–1960

Pierre Couderc (18 November 1896 – 6 October 1966) was a French screenwriter, actor, acrobat, and film producer. He wrote for 34 films between 1925 and 1930. He also appeared in ten films between 1914 and 1934. He was born in Paris, France and died in Santa Monica, California.

== Selected filmography ==
- The Patchwork Girl of Oz (1914)
- His Majesty, the Scarecrow of Oz (1914)
- Terror Trail (1921)
- On Your Toes (1927)
- College Love (1929, scenario)
- On the Sidelines and Use Your Feet (1929, story and scenario)
- Whose Wife? (1929, story)
- Captain Thunder (1930, story)
- The Big Trail (1931)
