= Adaptations of The Wonderful Wizard of Oz =

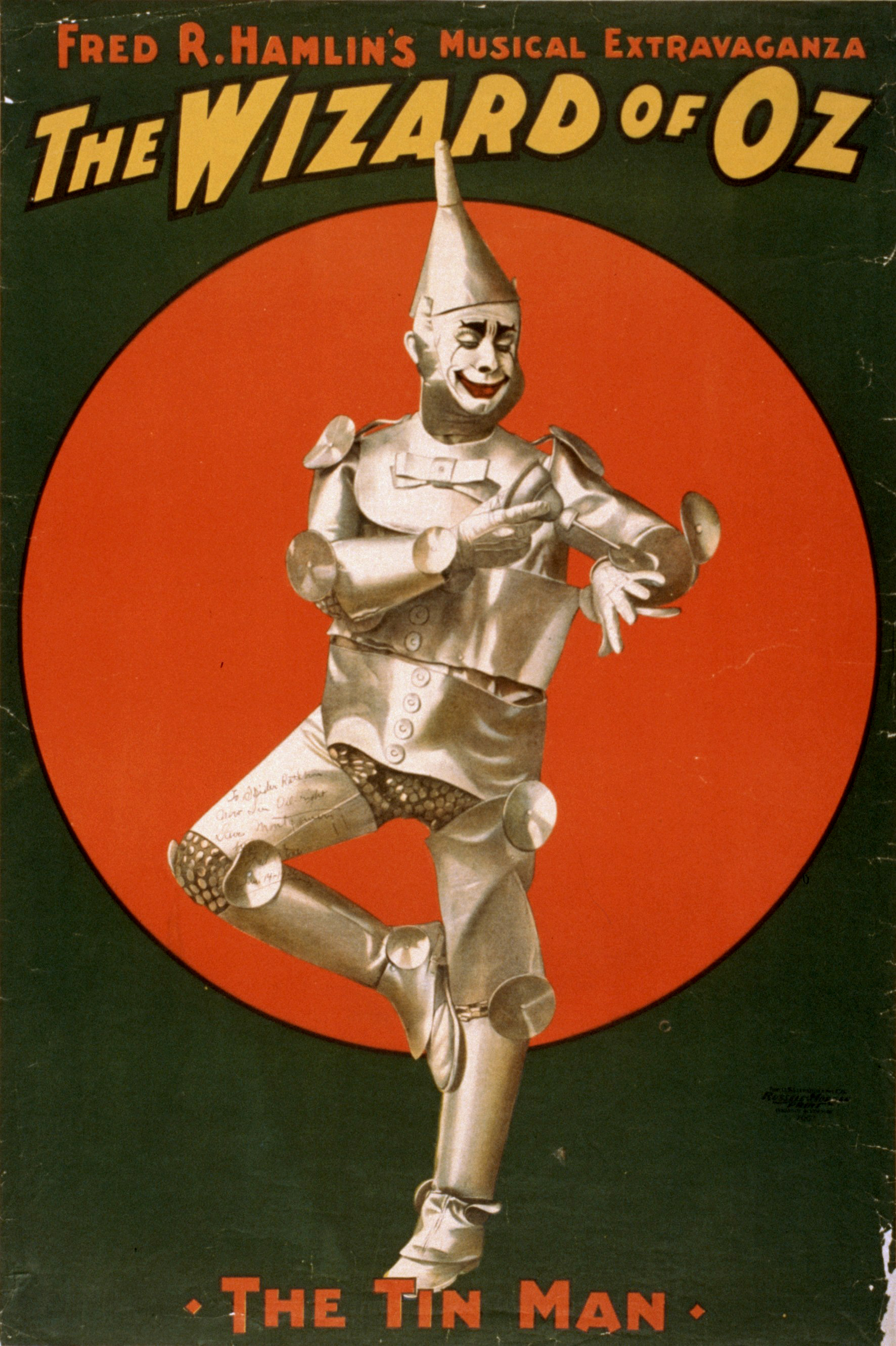
Poster for Fred R. Hamlin's 1902 musical extravaganza, the first major theatrical adaptation of The Wizard of Oz

The Wonderful Wizard of Oz is a 1900 children's novel written by American author L. Frank Baum. Since its first publication in 1900, it has been adapted many times by L. Frank Baum and others: for film, television, theatre, books, comics, games, and other media.

Baum was responsible for many early adaptations, including the 1902 musical The Wizard of Oz, which was an enormous success on Broadway. The casting of comedians Fred Stone as the Scarecrow and David C. Montgomery as the Tin Woodman was especially praised. Baum featured the two characters in his second Oz book, The Marvelous Land of Oz (1904), with the hopes of turning that into a stage play as well, with Stone and Montgomery in the lead roles. When the two actors declined to participate, Baum rewrote the story as The Woggle-Bug in 1905, which was a critical and commercial failure.

Following this, Baum was responsible for several more adaptations of the Oz series. His 1906 multimedia presentation, The Fairylogue and Radio-Plays, toured for two months. A further musical, The Tik-Tok Man of Oz, was staged in 1913. Baum also began a short-lived film company, The Oz Manufacturing Company, and released three short films, beginning with The Patchwork Girl of Oz in 1914.

The most celebrated adaptation of the Oz books is the 1939 feature-length musical starring Judy Garland, which has been hailed as the most-seen film in history. Other notable film adaptations include The Wiz (1978), Return to Oz (1985), and Oz the Great and Powerful (2013). Another acclaimed production is the 2003 Broadway and West End musical Wicked, based on the 1995 revisionist novel Wicked: The Life and Times of the Wicked Witch of the West by Gregory Maguire. The musical itself has since been adapted into a successful two-part film.

== Visual arts ==
=== English language Films ===
Name	Format	Original Release Date	Short summary
The Fairylogue and Radio-Plays	Live-action	September 24, 1908	Multimedia presentation made by L. Frank Baum which featured the young silent film actress Romola Remus.
The Wonderful Wizard of Oz	Live-action	March 24, 1910	15-minute 1910 film, based on the 1902 stage musical, directed by Otis Turner, and may have featured Bebe Daniels as Dorothy. It was followed by three now-lost films also directed by Turner: Dorothy and the Scarecrow in Oz, The Land of Oz, and John Dough and the Cherub, based on another Baum novel of the same name.
The Patchwork Girl of Oz	Live-action	August 6, 1914	This is an adaptation produced by Baum's live-action motion picture company, The Oz Film Manufacturing Company. It follows the adventures of Ojo, Unc Nunkie, and Patchwork Girl in their quest for the ingredients needed for a magic potion. The film is partially lost due to a missing scene early in the film.
His Majesty, the Scarecrow of Oz	Live-action	October 14, 1914	This is an adaptation by Baum via the Oz Film Manufacturing Company that became the basis for the book The Scarecrow of Oz.
The Magic Cloak of Oz	Live-action	September 28, 1914	Another 1914 adaptation in the series produced by Baum himself via The Oz Film Manufacturing Company. It follows the story of Fluff, the unhappiest person in Oz, and a magic cloak fairies devised for him to grant her one wish.
The Wizard of Oz	Live-action	April 13, 1925	Directed by Larry Semon in collaboration with Frank Joslyn Baum and featuring a young Oliver Hardy.
The Wizard of Oz	Animation	June 19, 1933	Animated short film directed by Ted Eshbaugh.
The Wizard of Oz	Animation	c. 1937/1938 (unreleased)	Animator Kenneth McLellan's efforts to produce a series of animated shorts after a contractual agreement with Maud Gage Baum. The shorts were ultimately not made, due to insufficient financial backing.
The Wizard of Oz	Live-action	August 25, 1939	The 1939 musical film by Metro-Goldwyn-Mayer, directed by Victor Fleming and starring Judy Garland, Ray Bolger, Jack Haley, Bert Lahr, Margaret Hamilton, and Frank Morgan. It is the story's best-known adaptation and the version about which most cultural references to the story are based.
The Wizard of Mars	Live-action	1965	Low budget science fiction film takeoff of L. Frank Baum's 1900 novel The Wonderful Wizard of Oz co-written and directed by stage magician David L. Hewitt.
The Wonderful Land of Oz	Live-action	October 31, 1969	A low-budget children's film adaptation of The Marvelous Land of Oz directed by Barry Mahon.
Journey Back to Oz	Animation	December 14, 1972	Begun in 1962, finished in 1971 and eventually released between 1972 and 1974. It features Liza Minnelli, the daughter of Judy Garland, as the voice of Dorothy.
The Wiz	Live-action	October 24, 1978	Directed by Sidney Lumet starring Diana Ross as Dorothy and Michael Jackson as the Scarecrow, based on the Broadway musical of the same name.
Return to Oz	Live-action	June 21, 1985	A 1985 film by Walt Disney Pictures, directed by Walter Murch and starring Fairuza Balk as Dorothy.
Dorothy Meets Ozma of Oz	Animation	November 18, 1987	Direct-to-video animated film produced by Kushner-Locke.
The Wizard of Oz	Animation	1991	Direct-to-video animated film produced by American Film Investment Corporation.
Apocalypse Oz	Live-action	2006	short film parody of The Wizard of Oz and Apocalypse Now.
The Wonderful Wizard of Ha's	Animation	2007	37th installment in the Veggietales direct-to-video series. Adapts The Wonderful Wizard of Oz with elements from the Parable of the Prodigal Son.
After the Wizard	Live-action	July 2, 2011	Independent film as a modern-day semi-sequel to the story.
Tom and Jerry and the Wizard of Oz	Animation	August 23, 2011	This is a Tom and Jerry direct-to-video film based on the 1939 film which first appeared on Cartoon Network on August 13, 2011. It was followed by a sequel, Tom and Jerry: Back to Oz, released June 21, 2016.
Dorothy and the Witches of Oz	Live-action	February 17, 2012	Edited together out of the 2011 miniseries Witches of Oz (see below under "Television"). The film version removed about an hour of footage and updated the visual effects.
Oz the Great and Powerful	Live-action	March 8, 2013	2013 film by Walt Disney Pictures, directed by Sam Raimi and starring James Franco, Michelle Williams and Mila Kunis.
Legends of Oz: Dorothy's Return	Animation	May 9, 2014	CGI animated musical adaptation of Dorothy of Oz by Roger S. Baum and stars Lea Michele.
OzLand	Live-action	September 4, 2014	Independent fantasy/sci-fi drama film inspired by characters and events from the book, which plays a crucial role.
Tom and Jerry: Back to Oz	Animation	June 21, 2016	Direct-to-video film, sequel to Tom and Jerry and the Wizard of Oz.
The Steam Engines of Oz	Animation	June 5, 2018	Canadian Animated film directed by Sean O'Reilly which is produced by Arcana Studio. It tells the story of Oz a hundred years later and features new characters as well as old ones.
Wicked	Live-action	November 22, 2024	Feature-length adaptation of the first act of the 2003 stage musical by Stephen Schwartz and Winnie Holzman, loosely based on the 1995 novel by Gregory Maguire.
The Wizard of Oz at Sphere	Live-action	August 28, 2025	Immersive 4D version of the 1939 film created specifically to be screened at Sphere in the Las Vegas Valley on the venue's 160,000 square-foot video screen at 16K resolution.
Wicked: For Good	Live-action	November 21, 2025	Sequel to Wicked (2024), adapting the stage musical's second act.
Gale: Yellow Brick Road	Live-action	February 11, 2026	Horror version of the adaptation.
Untitled Wicked spinoff film	Live-action	TBA	Spinoff of the film based on the 2003 stage musical by Stephen Schwartz and Winnie Holzman, loosely based on the 1995 novel by Gregory Maguire.

=== International films ===
Name	Format	Original Release Date	Short summary
Fantasía... 3	Anthology	1966	A Spanish anthology film using a portion of Baum's original novel in one of its sequences.
The Wizard of Oz	Live-action	1967	A black and white Soviet adaptation. While borrowing some elements from Alexander Volkov's retelling, it is considered an adaptation of Baum's book and is titled accordingly
Ayşecik ve Sihirli Cüceler Rüyalar Ülkesinde	Live-action	1971	A Turkish film directed by Tunç Başaran and known to bootleggers as "The Turkish Wizard of Oz".
The Wizard of Oz	Animation	July 1, 1982	Anime adaptation of the story produced by Toho in 1982 and directed by Fumihiko Takayama, with music by Joe Hisaishi. The English version of the movie stars Aileen Quinn as the voice of Dorothy and Lorne Greene as the Wizard. Original songs are sung by Aileen Quinn in the English version, with lyrics by Sammy Cahn and Allen Byrnes. In the U.S., it was released on video and syndicated to local television stations.
World Famous Fairy Tale Series	Animation	February 1983	Anime series of short films produced by Toei Animation.
Os Trapalhões e o Mágico de Oróz	Live-action	June 21, 1984	Brazilian parody of Wizard of the Oz.
W krainie czarnoksiężnika Oza	Animation	c. 1988	Polish series of theatrical shorts adapting The Wonderful Wizard of Oz and The Marvelous Land of Oz, produced by Se-ma-for and starring Ilona Kuśmierska as voice of the Dorothy and Piotr Fronczewski as the voice of Scarecrow.
Mamo, czy kury potrafią mówić?	Live-action/Animation	July 10, 1998	Polish loose adaptation of Ozma of Oz produced by Se-ma-for and starring Leon Niemczyk as voice of Awidor.
Guardians of Oz	Animation	April 10, 2015	Mexican-Indian 3D computer-animated adventure film directed by Alberto Mar. It features an original story and new characters.
The Wizard of the Emerald City	Live-action	January 1, 2025	Screen adaptation of the 1939 children's novel of the same name by the Soviet writer Alexander Melentyevich Volkov, based on a reworking of Baum's novel.

=== Theatre ===
In addition to his books, Baum also wrote Oz-related stage plays: The Wonderful Wizard of Oz (1901) with music by Paul Tietjens and Nathaniel D. Mann, The Wizard of Oz (1902) (music by Tietjens et al.; with jokes by Glen MacDonough), The Woggle-Bug (1905) with music by Frederick Chapin, The Rainbow's Daughter, or The Magnet of Love (February 1909) with music by Manuel Klein, revised in April 1909 as Ozma of Oz, and ultimately produced, with music by Louis F. Gottschalk as The Tik-Tok Man of Oz. Also in 1909, he wrote a play called The Girl from Oz. The manuscript is held in the archives at Syracuse University, but apparently its relation to Oz is little more than nominal (it is also known as The Girl from Tomorrow and was later adapted for radio by Frank Joslyn Baum), as is also the case with the short story, "The Littlest Giant", a rather brutal tale designated in two lines to be in the Gillikin country of Oz. With Gottschalk writing the music, he wrote an unproduced stage version of The Patchwork Girl of Oz in November 1913, that was developed into the film scenario.

Name	Lyrics by	Premiere date	Short summary
The Wonderful Wizard of Oz	L. Frank Baum	Unpublished (written in 1901)	A stage play closely based on the novel, featuring songs with music by Paul Tietjens.
The Wizard of Oz	L. Frank Baum; W. W. Denslow	June 16, 1902	This was the first musical version of The Wonderful Wizard of Oz produced by L. Frank Baum and W. W. Denslow (with music by composer Paul Tietjens) in Chicago in 1902 and moved to New York in 1903. It used many of the same characters, and was aimed more at adult audiences. It had a long, successful run on Broadway. Baum added numerous political references to the script, mentioning President Theodore Roosevelt, Senator Mark Hanna, and John D. Rockefeller by name. Many existing songs that had nothing to do with the story were interpolated.
The Woggle-Bug	L. Frank Baum; Arthur Gillespie	June 18, 1905	A stage musical based on The Marvelous Land of Oz, with music by Frederic Chapin. Reviews praised only Chapin and the show never opened on Broadway. It was also panned as a rehash rather than a sequel to "The Wizard of Oz".
The Rainbow's Daughter, or The Magnet of Love	L. Frank Baum	Never produced (written in 1909)	A stage musical, music by Manuel Klein, based on Ozma of Oz and The Road to Oz.
Ozma of Oz	L. Frank Baum	Never produced (written in 1909)	A revised draft of The Rainbow's Daughter.
The Girl from Oz	L. Frank Baum	Never produced (written in 1909)	While this is a play by Baum, the connection to Oz is reported as minimal. Held in the L. Frank Baum Papers at Syracuse University; later adapted for radio as The Girl of Tomorrow by Frank Joslyn Baum.
The Tik-Tok Man of Oz	L. Frank Baum; Oliver Morosco	March 31, 1913	The final version of The Rainbow's Daughter, now with music by Louis F. Gottschalk, as produced by Oliver Morosco. Morosco and Victor Schertzinger interpolated two songs of their own, but the production was not a big enough success for Morosco to want to move it to New York.
The Wizard of Oz	Yip Harburg	1942	This musical uses songs from the 1939 film. It was adapted by Frank Gabrielson for the St. Louis Municipal Opera. The piece continues to receive frequent revivals.
The Wiz	Charlie Smalls; Zachary Walzer; Luther Vandross	October 21, 1974	The musical exclusively features African American actors with music and lyrics are by Charlie Smalls. Stephanie Mills starred as Dorothy in the original Broadway cast. The production won the 1975 Tony Award for Best Musical. Geoffrey Holder directed a 1984 Broadway revival, which also featured Mills as Dorothy.
The Wizard of Oz	Yip Harburg	1987	An adaptation by John Kane for the Royal Shakespeare Company based on the novel and 1939 film, which hews more closely to the film's screenplay than the 1942 version. This show ran through 1989 and continues to be frequently revived and toured.
The Wizard of A.I.D.S.	Unknown	1987	An adaptation of the Oz story which serves as an AIDS education tool.
The Wizard of Oz on Ice	Unknown	1995	A Kenneth Feld production that toured from 1995 to 1999, based on the film and was choreographed by Robin Cousins. It featured a pre-recorded soundtrack with the voice of Laurena Wilkerson as Dorothy and narration by Bobby McFerrin. It toured nationally and internationally and was broadcast in 1996 with Oksana Baiul skating as Dorothy and Victor Petrenko as the Scarecrow, with Bobby McFerrin both narrating and appearing as the Wizard. Shanice was the prerecorded voice of Dorothy in the TV broadcast.
The Wizard of Oz in Concert: Dreams Come True	Unknown	November 22, 1995	This was a concert performance of the Royal Shakespeare Company's adaptation at Lincoln Center, featuring celebrity actors such as Jewel as Dorothy, Jackson Browne as the Scarecrow, Roger Daltrey as the Tin Man, Nathan Lane as the Lion, and Joel Grey as the Wizard (a role he later reprised in Wicked). The production also featured Debra Winger, Natalie Cole, and Lucie Arnaz. It was televised live in the United States that night.
The Wonderful Wizard of Oz	James P. Doyle; Joe Cascone	October 27, 2000	Premiering in Toronto in 2000, this musical was revived in 2002, 2010 and again in 2017.
Wicked	Stephen Schwartz	June 10, 2003	Broadway and West End musical based on Wicked: The Life and Times of the Wicked Witch of the West by Gregory Maguire. Universal Pictures had bought film rights to the 1995 novel when composer and lyricist Stephen Schwartz convinced the company to adapt the novel into a musical instead. Schwartz wrote Wicked's music and lyrics and it premiered on Broadway in October 2003.
The Wizard of Oz	Yip Harburg; Tim Rice	March 1, 2011	West End musical, building on the 1939 film songs and script with new material by Tim Rice and Andrew Lloyd Webber. It began previews on February 7, 2011 and officially opened on March 1. Danielle Hope, of the BBC television Series Over the Rainbow, appeared as Dorothy. Michael Crawford plays the role of the Wizard.
The Woodsman	James Ortiz; Edward W. Hardy; Jennifer Loring	2012	Off-Broadway play with minimal dialog and bunraku puppetry retelling the origin story of the Tin Woodsman. A pro-shot was released on BroadwayHD in 2016.
Somewhere Over the Border	Brian Quijada	2022	Musical imagining The Wizard of Oz, exploring migration from El Salvador to America.

=== Television ===
Many of the television programs cited in this list are not strict adaptions of The Wizard of Oz; rather, they have reinterpreted aspects of the book, such as characters and plot, to create sequels, prequels or side-plots, which are inspired by Baum's original text. This section does not include single episodes from a larger unrelated series.

Name	Format	Start date	End date	Short summary
Tales of the Wizard of Oz	Animated series	September 1, 1961	December 1961	Animated series of short episodes based on the Oz characters from the book.
Return to Oz	Special	February 9, 1964	—N/a	Animated television special unofficial sequel-remake of the 1939 film, based on the artistic renderings of the characters in the 1961 animated series.
Off to See the Wizard	Anthology	1967	1968	A 1967 television anthology series which showcased then-recent MGM family films. The Oz characters from the 1939 film appeared in animated segments.
The Wizard of Oz	Animated series	January 2, 1975	January 11, 1975	A puppet animation based on a novella of the same name by Alexander Volkov. It tells a story of the adventures of a girl named Ellie and her dog Totoshka, who—due to the wicked Gingema—find themselves in Magic Land, where incredible adventures await them.
Manga Sekai Mukashi Banashi	Anthology	May 3, 1978	May 24, 1978	An anime television anthology, has a four 10-minute episodes adaptation.
Thanksgiving in the Land of Oz	Special	November 15, 1980	—N/a	Animated television Thanksgiving special. Retitled Dorothy in the Land of Oz in future airings.
The Wonderful Wizard of Oz	Animated series	October 6, 1986	September 28, 1987	This anime adaptation consists of 52 episodes and follows the story of Dorothy and her adventures in Oz with the Tin Woodman, Cowardly Lion, and Scarecrow. It continues on to the story of Ozma and Mombi, and follows the events in other Oz books. In 1987, HBO purchased the rights to the series and edited together key episodes of the series into a series of movies, which aired as a television mini-series. Production for the English version was done by the Canadian studio Cinar.
The Wizard of Oz	Animated series	September 8, 1990	December 28, 1990	An animated series based on the 1939 film, was broadcast on ABC during the 1990–1991 TV season. The cartoon featured Dorothy returning to Oz, reuniting with her four friends, and journeying through the magical realm in an attempt to save the Wizard from a resurrected Witch of the West.
The Wonderful Galaxy of Oz	Animated series	October 5, 1992	April 4, 1993	Japanese anime series involving Dorothy and her friends in a futuristic setting, traveling the "Galaxy of Oz". It was truncated to 76 minutes and dubbed for the American release.
World Fairy Tale Series	Anthology	September 29, 1995	—N/a	Anime television anthology produced by Toei Animation, has half-hour adaptation.
The Oz Kids	Animated series	October 1, 1996	February 18, 1997	Animated series by Paramount Pictures and Hyperion Pictures featuring the children of the original characters.
The Muppets' Wizard of Oz	Television film	May 20, 2005	—N/a	Starring Ashanti, Queen Latifah and The Muppets. Miss Piggy plays all of the witches, Pepe plays Toto, Kermit plays the Scarecrow, Gonzo plays the Tin Man, and Fozzie plays the Lion.
Tin Man	Miniseries	December 2, 2007	December 4, 2007	Three-part miniseries released on the Sci-fi Channel by RHI Entertainment. The miniseries, directed by Nick Willing and starring Zooey Deschanel, Richard Dreyfuss, Alan Cumming, Raoul Trujillo, Neal McDonough, and Kathleen Robertson, is a re-imagined future version of The Wizard of Oz. The heroine, D.G., is a descendant of Dorothy Gale. Other humans, called "Slippers" by the people of Oz, have visited Oz since Gale's fateful adventure.
Witches of Oz	Miniseries	2012	—N/a	Television mini-series directed by Leigh Scott, based on the novels The Wonderful Wizard of Oz, Ozma of Oz, The Road to Oz, and The Magic of Oz by Baum.
Lost in Oz	Animated series	June 26, 2015	June 8, 2018	On June 26, 2015, Amazon Video released an original 24-minute pilot for an animated series, Lost in Oz. On November 2, 2016, it was re-released with additional content under the title Lost in Oz: Extended Adventure. The two seasons series aired on August 4, 2017.
The Wiz Live!	Special	December 3, 2015	—N/a	Produced by Craig Zadan and Neil Meron, it is a performance of a new adaptation of the 1975 Broadway musical The Wiz, a soul/R&B reinterpretation of L. Frank Baum's The Wonderful Wizard of Oz. The performance aired live from Grumman Studios in Bethpage, New York.
Emerald City	Television series	January 6, 2017	March 3, 2017	Created by Matthew Arnold for 10 episodes. In August 2014, it was reported that NBC would not be proceeding with the series. In April 2015, NBC reversed course and announced that the series would move forward under the leadership of executive producer and writer David Schulner.
Dorothy and the Wizard of Oz	Animated series	June 29, 2017	July 31, 2020	Animated series based on the 1939 film produced by Warner Bros. Animation. It was released in June 2017 for Boomerang's SVOD service. Clips of the series were revealed in the Boomerang upfront for 2017.

=== Music videos ===
The following are strictly limited to Wizard of Oz-themed imagery:

Artist	Song name	Release date	Short summary
Nirvana	Heart-Shaped Box	August 30, 1993	Nirvana's video makes extensive use of symbolism, much of which touches on Oz themes and imagery. The bulk of the video takes place in a field of fake poppies. The video also shows a stand of 'spooky' trees, and a pointed hat sinking into a puddle, which bear a resemblance to the 1939 film. Additionally, there are multiple shots of a man suspended in a crucified position from a rough cross and adorned with ravens in a manner more suggestive of a scarecrow.
Blues Traveler	Run-Around	February 28, 1995	The music video for "Run-Around" has a Wizard of Oz motif, with Blues Traveler playing behind a curtain in a nightclub while a young, "hip" and more "photogenic" group appears to be playing the song.
Sara Evans	Born to Fly	June 26, 2000	Sara Evans stars as Dorothy in her music video "Born to Fly".
De La Soul	Oooh.	July 10, 2000	The music video shows the "Land of Oooh", which is heavily based on the Land of Oz.
Toy-Box	Wizard of Oz	July 28, 2001	Romantic song about a girl finding her true love (her "Wizard") who welcomes her to the "Land of Oz".
The Good Life	Heartbroke	September 11, 2007	The music video has characters from The Wizard of Oz going to a pastry/ice cream shop. There are two versions to this video; a "nice" version and a "mean" version. In the "nice" version the characters pretend to rob the shop but then purchase treats. In the "mean" version they violently rob the store, but the Scarecrow does not make it on time due to a flat tire and the would-be robbers get arrested.
The Black Eyed Peas	Imma Be Rocking That Body	January 12, 2010	The music video is claimed to be the futuristic version of The Wizard of Oz.
Tech N9ne	He's A Mental Giant	May 4, 2011	This song follows the plot to the Wizard of Oz with darker imagery.
Naughty Boy	La la la	May 13, 2013	The music video featuring Sam Smith shows a young boy traveling around a city meeting characters resembling the Lion, the Tin Man, and the Scarecrow.

== Written works ==
=== Comics ===
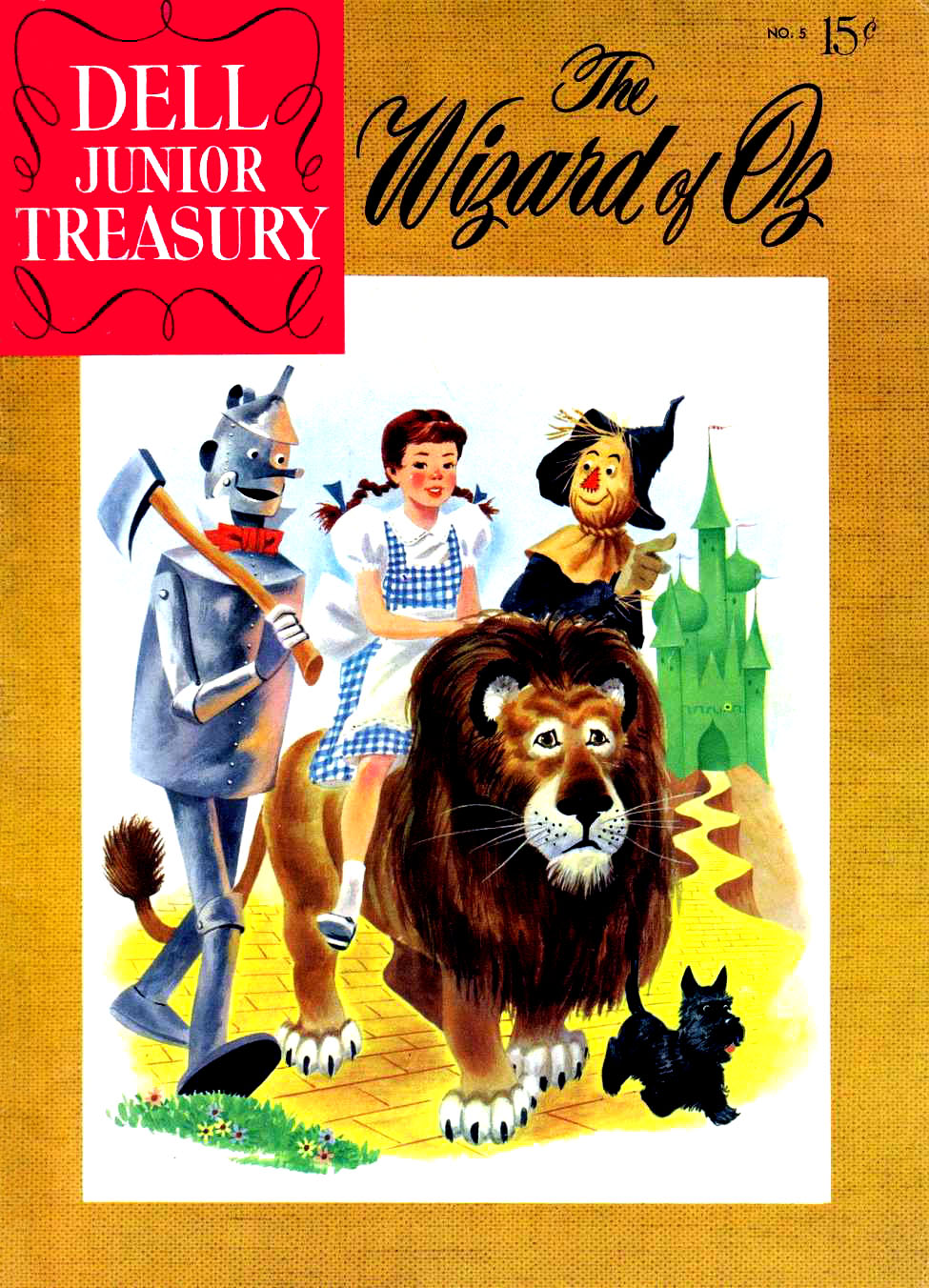
The Wizard of Oz (Dell Comics, June 1956). Cover art by Mel Crawford.

- MGM's Marvelous Wizard of Oz was the first joint publishing venture between DC Comics and Marvel Comics.
- Marvel Treasury of Oz printed The Marvelous Land of Oz.
- One of the issues of Classics Illustrated Junior was a condensed version of The Wizard of Oz.
- The comic book series Oz Squad features an adult Dorothy and her original companions from The Wonderful Wizard of Oz as a covert operations group protecting Oz from threats both within its borders and from the "real world".
- The Oz-Wonderland War is a comics story in which the people of Oz fight together with the characters of Lewis Carroll's Alice's Adventures in Wonderland and Through the Looking-Glass against the villainous Nome King. It also starred Captain Carrot and the Zoo Crew and was originally intended to be the comic's issues #21–26. The comic, however, was cancelled at #20, and the story was subsequently presented as a mini-series.
- Dorothy of Oz (Korean:Dorosi) is a manhwa (Korean comic) by Son Hee-joon about an ordinary girl named Mara Shin who winds up in a science-fantasy realm called "Oz". She meets up with this realm's version of the Scarecrow, the Tin Woodsman and the Cowardly Lion, and follows the Yellow Brick Road to find her way home.
- The comic book Dorothy was launched by Illusive Arts Entertainment in November 2005. Presented in semi-fumetti style using digitally altered photographs, this retelling of Baum's story has been updated to 2005 and features model Catie Fisher as 16-year-old Dorothy Gale, a disaffected youth with dyed hair and piercings who steals her uncle's car and runs away from home; until she encounters a tornado and is knocked unconscious.
- An erotic re-telling of the story is featured in Lost Girls, a graphic novel by Alan Moore and Melinda Gebbie first published in its entirety in 2006. In this book, an adult Dorothy meets Alice from Alice's Adventures in Wonderland and Wendy Darling from Peter Pan and the trio recount the stories of their respective works as allegories for their sexual awakenings.
- Erfworld (2006-2019) was heavily inspired by The Wizard of Oz. It includes a distorted retelling of the original, with some characters and elements persisting into the main narrative. "Charlescomm", the comic's primary antagonist, is revealed to be the wizard.
- From 2009 to 2014, Oz fan Eric Shanower faithfully adapted The Wonderful Wizard of Oz, The Marvelous Land of Oz, Ozma of Oz, Dorothy and the Wizard in Oz, The Road to Oz, and The Emerald City of Oz into graphic novels illustrated by Skottie Young and published by Marvel Comics. In 2020, Shanower's Oz graphic novels were rereleased in three collected volumes.
- Marvel Fairy Tales features a retelling of The Wizard of Oz starring Marvel characters, such as the She-Hulk as Dorothy and the Scarlet Witch as the Wicked Witch of the West.
- The Steam Engines of Oz is a graphic novel series published by Arcana Studio. It is a "steampunk re-imagining" of The Wonderful Wizard of Oz.
- In Serbia, Đorđe Lobačev started his adaptation in 1941 but wouldn't be able to finish it until 1974.
- In Spain, an adaptation was published by Art Studium in 1978 (as El Mago de Oz).
- In Italy, Anna Brandoli and Renato Queirolo adapted Il mago di Oz in 1980.
- In France, David Chauvel (script) and Enrique Fernández (art) adapted it as Le magicien d'Oz (published by Delcourt in three volumes in 2005).
- Tommy Ohtsuka also did a manga version of the book.

== Games ==
- The Wonderful Game of Oz, a board game published in 1921 by Parker Brothers.
- The Wizard of Oz, a 1985 illustrated text adventure game for Apple II, Commodore 64, and MS-DOS, which combined elements of The Wonderful Wizard of Oz and The Marvelous Land of Oz. It was published by Windham Classics, a subsidiary of Spinnaker Software.
- The Wizard of Oz, a 1993 video game for the Super NES, based on the 1939 film.
- The Yellow Brick Road (イエロー ・ブリツク ・ロード) trilogy, a multiplatform adventure RPG series developed in Japan by SYNERGY.
- Wizard of Land Oz (Волшебник страны Оз), a 1997 ZX Spectrum adventure game by Famous Faces Factory.
- Irozuki Tincle no Koi no Balloon Trip, a Japanese game which is a spin-off of The Legend of Zelda series. It features Tingle teaming up with a tin woman, a scarecrow and a cowardly lion to cross the land. Released in 2009.
- Emerald City Confidential, a point-and-click adventure game developed by Wadjet Eye Games and published by casual game portal PlayFirst. Released in 2009.
- RIZ-ZOAWD, a Japanese role-playing video game for the Nintendo DS, released in the US as The Wizard of Oz: Beyond the Yellow Brick Road. Released in 2008.
- The Wizard of Oz, a coin pusher game found in video arcades.
- Wizard of Oz Slots game found in Casinos. The game is a five-reel video slot machine with bonus feature rounds, produced by WMS (Williams Gaming). Released in 2013.
- The Card Game of Oz, a 2014 game created by James C. O'Connor under his Orion's Bell label. The game is based on the original books. Series 1, The Wonderful Wizard of Oz, was released in May 2014. Series 2, The Marvelous Land of Oz, was released in August 2014 as an expansion.
- The crossover-genre video game Lego Dimensions features a world based on the 1939 film.
- The mobile game Oz: Broken Kingdom Is based on the world of Oz and takes place after the original story.
- In Sherlock: Hidden Match-3 Cases, a mobile video game published in 2020 by G5 Entertainment, one of the featured books is The Wonderful Wizard of Oz.

== Other media ==
- In September 1933, The Wizard of Oz debuted on the NBC radio network, sponsored by General Foods Corporation. It presented dramatizations of episodes from the book.
- In 1967, The Seekers recorded "Emerald City", with lyrics about a visit there, set to the melody of Beethoven's "Ode to Joy".
- Ray Bolger recorded an audio adaptation of The Wizard of Oz. This was the first in a series of four audiotapes, The Oz Audio Collection, recorded by Bolger and issued by Caedmon Audio from 1976 to 1983.
- Todd McFarlane created a sinister toy series called Twisted Land of Oz that portrays all of the characters as more sinister (such as the monster Toto) and adult oriented (BDSM Dorothy).
- The musical group America released the song "Tin Man" in 1974, with the enigmatic line; "And Oz never did give nothin' to the Tin Man, that he didn't already have." The song was the first single released from their album Holiday and became a top ten hit.
- German Power Metal band Blind Guardian made use of the story of the Wizard of Oz in the title track of their 1995 studio album Imaginations From the Other Side.
- Walt Disney originally wanted to make an animated version of The Wizard Of Oz to serve as the follow-up to Snow White and the Seven Dwarfs, but the film rights were bought by Samuel Goldwyn, who originally intended to make it as a standard musical comedy, with Eddie Cantor as his star. However, Goldwyn ended up selling the rights to MGM.
- The Felice Brothers wrote a song called "Don't Wake the Scarecrow" which features several references to The Wizard of Oz.
- American McGee's Oz was a darkly, twisted series of figurines based on Baum's original Wizard of Oz characters. This series was released before McFarlane's, and was supposed to help McGee launch a franchise around this interpretation.

- Elton John's album Goodbye Yellow Brick Road is a clear reference to The Wizard of Oz.
- The Wiyos's album Twist is an original song cycle loosely based on The Wizard of Oz.
- Ray Bradbury's short story "The Exiles" mentions the Emerald City and its inhabitants existing alongside other famous literary characters and locales on a Martian colony.
- Big Finish Productions made a full-cast audio drama adaptation of the novel, adapted by Marc Platt.
- The novel has been adapted for radio at least twice by the BBC: the first attempt was broadcast in 1994, dramatised by Marcy Kahan and starring Maureen Lipman as the Wicked Witch of the West. A much darker take on the story was broadcast on BBC Radio 4 in December 2009 and featured Amelia Clarkson as Dorothy, Emma Fielding as the Wicked Witch of the West (as well as the other witches) and Jonathan Keeble as the Wizard.
- The Wonderful Wizard of Oz as well as the other two books in the first portion of the series were adapted by Australian playwright Aron Toman into an audio drama podcast series which imagines a more adult, politically-driven rendition of Baum's world. Entitled The Chronicles of Oz, the series adapted The Marvellous Land of Oz and Ozma of Oz after adapting the first book.
- AIEC Wizard of Oz is a short film parody of The Wizard of Oz starring characters from the Adventure In Epic's Chat web series.
- Edward W. Hardy released a cast album entitled The Woodsman (Original Off-Broadway Solo Recording)
- "Straight Outta Oz" is a studio album and original musical written and produced by Todrick Hall. It is based on the Wizard of Oz whilst being a semi-autobiographical account of his rise to fame in Los Angeles (Oz). The trailer for the album was first released on May 13, 2016. Todrick has released the musical in the form of (as well as each song separately) on his YouTube channel on March 21, 2017. It includes a host of guest stars including Nicole Scherzinger, Jordin Sparks, Perez Hilton, Joseph Gordon-Levitt, Amber Riley, Raven-Symoné, and Tamar Braxton.
- The marketing campaign for season 22 of American Idol is directly themed after the 1939 film, complete with a commercial featuring Ryan Seacrest and the judges Katy Perry, Lionel Richie and Luke Bryan dressed as Tin Man, Dorothy, Cowardly Lion and Scarecrow following the "Golden Ticket Road" to Hollywood. This was to reflect the show's plans to visit the judges' hometowns throughout the season.

== Cancelled ==
- The Rainbow Road to Oz was a proposed Walt Disney live-action production. A preview segment aired in 1957 on the Disneyland TV show, featuring Darlene Gillespie as Dorothy, Annette Funicello as Ozma, Bobby Burgess as the Scarecrow, Doreen Tracey as Scraps, the Patchwork Girl, and Jimmie Dodd as the Cowardly Lion.
- Tim Burton's Lost in Oz is a 2000 unrealized television pilot script written by Trey Callaway with Tim Burton as executive producer. Key scenes were filmed by Michael Katleman.

== See also ==
- Wicked Witch of the East, bro!
