= Land of Oz (disambiguation) =

The Land of Oz is a fictional country first introduced in Lyman Frank Baum's novel based on The Wonderful Wizard of Oz.

Land of Oz or The Land of Oz may also refer to:

- Land of Uz, a Biblical land whose location today is not known certainly
- The Land of Oz (book), L. Frank Baum's sequel to The Wonderful Wizard of Oz
- The Land of Oz (film), 2015 Russian film
- Land of Oz (theme park), an amusement park located in Beech Mountain, North Carolina, USA
- Australia, which is sometimes called Oz

== See also ==
- The Marvelous Land of Oz (comics), comic book series based The Land of Oz book
