= I Hate Fairyland =

American comic

- Cover of I Hate Fairyland #1, featuring Gert and Larry

Publication information
- Publisher: Image Comics
- Schedule: Monthly
- Format: Ongoing series
- Genre: Comedy, fantasy, isekai
- Publication date: October 2015 – present
- No. of issues: 20 (first series), 30 (second series)
- Main character(s): Gertrude "Gert"; Larry Wentsworth III

Creative team
- Created by: Skottie Young
- Written by: Skottie Young
- Artists: Skottie Young; Brett Bean; Derek Laufman
- Letterer: Nate Piekos
- Colorist: Jean-Francois Beaulieu

Collected editions
- Madly Ever After: ISBN 1-63215-685-7
- Fluff My Life: ISBN 1-5343-1248-X
- Good Girl: ISBN 1-5343-0330-8
- Sadly Never After: ISBN 1-5343-0680-3
- Gert's Inferno: ISBN 1-5343-2598-0
- Last Gert Standing: ISBN 1-5343-9785-X
- Untold Tales: ISBN 1-5343-9825-2
- In the Mean Time: ISBN 1-5343-7617-8
- Happy End Game: ISBN 1-5343-3215-4
- Back On My Bull Ship: ISBN 1-5343-2938-2
- Monsters Gonna Monster: ISBN 1-5343-3581-1

I Hate Fairyland, also known as Fuck Fairyland, is a black comedy fantasy comic written and illustrated by Skottie Young, and published by Image Comics, which started publication in October 2015. The comic follows Gertrude "Gert", who was transported to a mystical world called Fairyland as a 10-year-old girl. Twenty-seven years later, Gert is an un-aging, violent misanthrope who, alongside her reluctant guide and friend Larry Wentsworth III, constantly tries and fails to return to Earth, across the storylines Madly Ever After, Fluff My Life, Good Girl, I Hate Image, Sadly Never After, Fluff This World, Gert's Inferno, Last Gert Standing, In the Mean Time, Happy End Game, Back On My Bull Ship, and Monsters Gonna Monster.

While the comic went on hiatus after the release of Issue #20 in July 2018, a revival series written by Young and illustrated by Brett Bean began in November 2022, still under the name I Hate Fairyland but starting with a new #1 issue. The series initially focuses on Gertrude, now an adult going back to Fairyland under William Wiggan's orders to turn it into an amusement park, before turning its focus back to the original Gert. A spin-off anthology series, The Unbelievable Unfortunately Mostly Unreadable and Nearly Unpublishable Untold Tales of I Hate Fairyland!, with stories written and illustrated by an alternating lineup of creators, has also been published since 2021.

== Publication history ==
According to a Paste interview, Skottie Young first developed the concept while working on 2009's The Wonderful Wizard of Oz limited series at Marvel Comics, with the idea that Dorothy would eventually "be super annoyed by all these characters." Gertrude being an adult stuck in a child's body came from Young's experiences as a new father, finding himself repeatedly reading and watching the same picture books and preschool shows with his child. Young claims Mad Magazine, the DC Comics character Lobo and Tank Girl as other significant influences. The first issue was released on October 14, 2015. It sold an estimated 50,300 copies and was the 42nd best selling issue of the month by units.

The comic went on hiatus after the release of Issue #20 in July 2018, until Young announced in August 2021 that it would be returning. The revived series will still be published by Image Comics and written by Young, and was initially set to feature Brett Parson as the new primary artist. Since the announcement, short side stories illustrated by other artists, collected as The Unbelievable Unfortunately Mostly Unreadable and Nearly Unpublishable Untold Tales of I Hate Fairyland!, have been released as timed exclusives for subscribers of Young's Substack newsletter. These stories, which are separate from the main series, will later receive wider publication.

The first issue of the revival series, which restarted its numbering at #1 and started out by featuring Brett Bean as the primary artist, was released on November 16, 2022.

In June 2025, the series returned to legacy numbering, jumping from issue #20 of the revival series to issue #41 of the combined series as a whole, and featuring new artist Derek Laufman.

== Characters ==
- Gertrude: Also known as Gert, she is the main protagonist of the series.
- Larry (Larrigon Wentsworth III): A fly sidekick to Gert in the original series
- Queen Cloudia: The main villain of the original series
- Slug Lord: Ruler of Las Fungus
- Brudd the Brutal: A Huntsman that Cloudia hires to kill Gertrude
- Horribella: A witch that Cloudia hires to get rid of Gertrude
- Darketh Deaddeath: One of the dark lords in the farthest reaches of Fairyland
- Pervis Peddlesteal: A packrat that collects items from children that visit Fairyland
- Nickey Nines: The feline leader of the Tower of Battle
- Purty Pretty Princess: The champion fighter of the Tower of Battle
- Maddie: A follower of Gert
- Loveth Lovelord: Ruler of a maze that holds the Balls of Redemption
- "Bill", Devil of Fairyland: The Ruler of Fairyland's hell
- Fairyland Council: The ones who dictate the rules of the land and convene when any threat should befall it.
- Happy: Another human child invited to Fairyland by Cloudia
- Duncan: A boy in a dragon costume that somehow ended up accidentally transported to Fairyland after drinking up too much slushie during Halloween.
- William Wiggins: A tycoon in the revival series who is likely the main villain.
- Rotwald Rat: A talking Rat from the revival series who came into the real world by accident.
- Virgil: A demon who guides Rotwald and Gert into hell.
- Cutey Pukey: The original gertling was killed by Gert to stop the gertlings rampage but comes back to life.

== Plot ==
=== Original run ===
==== Madly Ever After ====
The plot starts with Gertrude "Gert" falling into Fairyland as a six-year-old. She spends 27 years looking for a key to escape with her assigned insect guide Larrigton Wentsworth III, or Larry for short, but never ages, resulting in her becoming a violent sociopath. After terrorizing Fairyland, Queen Cloudia, the secretly evil ruler of Fairyland, sends after Gert many 'villains', such as a witch named Horribella. With each attempt ending in failure, Queen Cloudia then decides to kill her personally. She consults the Fairyland Council and they devise a plan to get rid of Gert. As the Queen cannot directly harm any guests, Cloudia invites another child, Happy, into Fairyland, to make Gert a citizen of Fairyland. Gert confronts Happy and shortly tries to kill her, but is easily defeated by Happy. After Gert recovers, she visits Queen Cloudia and asks her what is going on. Cloudia tells her she's too late, and admits she helped Happy on her quest to find the key. Sometime after, Happy does find the key. Annoyed by this, Gert finds Darketh Deaddeath, who she asks to help her defeat Happy. He agrees to help her, only if she proves herself. She survives his dungeon, and insults him. He then decides to help her and gives her his dark magic powers. Happy almost uses the key to exit Fairyland, but then a super-powered Gert stops her in her tracks. After a brief battle, Gert defeats Happy and then kills Cloudia. Before Gert can return home, Larry informs her that killing the Queen makes her the Queen herself, resulting in her unhappily taking the throne.

==== Fluff My Life ====
After a disastrous year as Fairyland's "evil queen", Gert is impeached and resumes looking for a way home. While meeting with Pervis Peddlesteal, an anthropomorphic rat who collects artefacts from Earth, she encounters Duncan, a human boy dressed in a dragon Halloween costume recently arrived in Fairyland. Duncan joins Gert on her travels, however, she willingly abandons him in the Tower of Battle, a gigantic arcade machine populated by powerful fighters. One hundred years later, Duncan has become an actual giant dragon and lays waste to Fairyland, killing all but a small handful of survivors, including Gert and Larry. Using the last remaining magic in Fairyland, Larry transports Gertrude back in time to the present of the series to warn her younger self away from the decisions that lead to the destruction of Fairyland. The older Gert gives her younger self step-by-step instructions to avert the apocalypse, but wearily notes that she has not listened to any of them, fading from existence as her younger self rushes into the first of many disasters.

==== I Hate Image ====
After beating up Kamau Kogo on Bitch Planet and learning how to traverse the Image Universe to return home, Gert kills versions of Rick Grimes and Coach Euless Boss before following the Paper Girls into Image City. After being led to the god-run nightclub Wic + Div by Tony Chu, Gert sets off a battle royale between the various superheroes and villains within, stealing their weaponry in the process, before seeking out the aid of Spawn to give her access to the Image Central building. After killing everyone in the building and confronting the founders of Image Comics, Gert demands to be allowed to go home, killing them all as a show of force before realising she needed one of them alive to return home. Dejected, Gert returns to Fairyland with Larry.

==== Good Girl ====
Gert meets Maddie, a denizen of Fairyland and her self-proclaimed "biggest fan", who idolises Gert for the violence and death she has spread. Although initially happy to take Maddie on as a protege, Gert quickly becomes sick of her, and realizes that she does not like the person she has become. She murders Maddie and resolves to become a better person. Despite her best intentions, Gert repeatedly fails to do good, leaving just as much death and destruction in her wake. However, Larry tells her of a mysterious labyrinth which could hold the secret to helping her become good, and concedes that, as miserable as his life with Gert has been, it probably would have been even worse had they never met. When they reach the labyrinth, its master, Loveth Lovelord, makes Gert a deal; if she can reach the center of the labyrinth before the next "Lover's Moon" and find the "Balls of Redemption", all the evil will be purged from her being, if she fails, she must become his wife. Gert manages to find the centre of the labyrinth, and Loveth unleashes the beast that guards the Balls, which turns out to be Duncan. Despite Duncan demonstrating the newly acquired draconic powers of flight and fire breathing, Gertrude easily defeats him and touches the Balls of Redemption, becoming a perfectly good and sweet child similar to Happy. The newly good Gert makes quick progress in her quest, prompting Horribella to hire the deadliest assassins in Fairyland to stop her on behalf of an unseen "Ruler of All That is Dark". Gert finds her key and heads back to the centre of Fairyland to finally leave. Horribella's assassins attack her, but all inexplicably miss her when they throw their weapons. Gert picks up a lollipop and skips towards the door, but trips and falls at the last moment, causing the lollipop to penetrate her brain, killing her instantly. As Larry quietly mourns her death, Gert descends into Hell, with the effects of the Balls reversed. Upon arriving in Hell, she is met by the "Ruler of All That Is Dark" – Happy.

==== Sadly Never After ====
The ruler of Hell is revealed not to be Happy, but a shapeshifting demon named Bill assuming her form. After failing to torment Gert with a twisted version of her home, he condemns her to an eternity of repeating her quest. Meanwhile, Horribella calls Bill and demands Queen Cloudia's bones, her payment for engineering Gert's death. Bill has the bones delivered to her by Duncan, who has become a postal courier. Horribella, planning to bring about the end of Fairyland, resurrects Cloudia as a powerful undead being who kills her and goes on a destructive rampage. Realising that Gert is the only one who can defeat "Dark Cloudia", Duncan and Larry confront the Fairyland Council and tell them that they must resurrect Gert to save Fairyland. The Council initially refuse, citing the rules of Fairyland, but Duncan retorts that the rules, and the council, are directly responsible for the crisis, and that by kidnapping children like him and Gertrude, they have abdicated any moral authority. One of the Council member concedes that Duncan is correct, and orders Bill to deliver the pocket dimension containing Gert's Hell to the council chamber. Duncan and Larry enter Hell and inform Gert about Dark Cloudia; subsequently, Gert agrees to kill Cloudia again. When returned to Fairyland she attempts to renege on the deal and demands to return to Hell when she realizes that her actions would serve the council's purpose. The Council nevertheless promises to return Gert home if she succeeds, and forcibly empowers her with their combined magic. Meanwhile, Dark Cloudia destroys the army of King Cone, the new Fairyland king, who tries to stop her wave of destruction in vain. Before Dark Cloudia can slay the king, however, Gert appears and attacks her with her new magical powers, depowering Cloudia and beating her up. Although Gert almost kills Cloudia again, Larry reminds her that the Council never specified that Cloudia has to die in their request, and Gert decides to follow his advice for once and gives the defeated villain to King Cone so she will be imprisoned for her crimes. The Council then appears, angry because Gert didn't kill Cloudia (despite the fact that she technically fulfilled their request) and threatening to exile her to a remote place in Fairyland, until Gertrude reminds them that she still has their combined magic inside her and would use it to kill them unless they honor their part of the deal, and the fearful Council quickly sends her back home, much to Larry's sorrow. Back on Earth, Gert, now an adult woman in her thirties, finds herself employed as a clerk in a television station, ironically frustrated by her mundane job and looking for a way to return. However, she abandons her search and ruefully curses Fairyland one last time before getting back to work, determined to face her lot in life.

=== Fluff This World ===
In The Unbelievable Unfortunately Mostly Unreadable and Nearly Unpublishable Untold Tales of I Hate Fairyland! storyline Fluff This World, exclusive to the Substack edition of the series, and not physically published by Image Comics, the adult Gert recounts to her therapist a dream of tracking down Skottie Young and returning to Fairyland to wreak havoc as an adult, only to find herself stuck as a child again.

=== 2022 revival ===
==== Gert's Inferno ====
The now adult Gert is unable to keep a job, as she lacks any education or skills applicable to the real world, and misses Fairyland where she was notorious and feared. After she is beaten up in a bar and dumped in an alley, a tech billionaire named William Wiggins hires her to find his missing son, who he believes has been taken to Fairyland. Gert agrees, in exchange for half the profits from the planet-wide theme park that Wiggins intends to build on Fairyland once the expedition is complete. He sends Gert and Rotwald Rat, a talking rat from Fairyland who his scientists accidentally brought to Earth, through a portal to Fairyland. They emerge at the gates of the Inferno, a hell-like dimension created to prevent previous visitors to Fairyland re-entering. They meet a demon named Virgil, who agrees to guide them through the Inferno and into Fairyland, promising the journey will last a few days. However, Gert eats Virgil's map and they are lost in the Inferno for years. Along the way they inadvertently create additional dangers for themselves, including a ravenous "gertling" known as "Cutey Pukey", and a golem created from a monster's stomach contents which lusts after Gertrude.

Gert, Rotwald and Virgil are finally able to complete a series of fetch quests to reach the end of the Inferno and obtain a ticket into Fairyland. Gert tearfully bids farewell to Virgil and re-enters Fairyland. As soon as they cross through the portal, Rotwald receives a call from Wiggins, who tells Gert that his son has shown up on Earth and that he has no intention of extracting Gert due to legal issues, leaving her once again trapped in Fairyland permanently. Gert kicks Rotwald in a rage, declaring "I hate Fairyland!". Rotwald lands some distance away in front of the latest "guest" of Fairyland, and Larry who is shocked at hearing Gert had returned.

==== Last Gert Standing ====
As Gert reunites with Larry, Larry explains that he got a successful career as guide since she left and that he guided Wiggins' son. Meanwhile, Fairyland's new ruler and Cloudia's brother, King Cloudius, gets enraged to learn about Gert's return. After rejecting suggestions from the new council, Cloudius decides to bring the original Gert and several different counterparts to his timeline to kill current Gert. As Gert goes with Larry and the kid to the door upon finding the key, Cloudius sees through Gert's cheap ghost costume, starting a bloody battle between Gertrude and her counterparts until only the original Gert survives. However, to Cloudius' anger, Gert lets the kid to use the door unaware of it was the way home Cloudius promised her to if she killed adult Gert.

Gert decides that she would search for Duncan and ask him for help when Larry assumes that he would have a map and a key. They see that Duncan is now an adult man with anger issues and working for Horribella's cousin. Although upset with Gert for the way she treated him back when he was a child, and for inadvertently preventing him from learning he even had a key, Duncan accepts to help Gert, and they break Cloudia out of prison to help find Duncan's key. However, on the trio finding the key, Cloudia steals it for herself, travelling to Earth.

==== In the Mean Time ====
On Earth, Cloudia is immediately run over, while in Fairyland, Gert consults on a film adaptation of her life, before the Gertlins return to invade.

==== Happy End Game ====
Deep below the Inferno, in the bowels of Hell, the real Happy, the devil Bill, and the adult Gert together gather up an army of the dead to put an end to the young Gert once and for all, as the young Gert celebrates saving Fairyland from monster infestation.

==== Back On My Bull Ship ====
Gert and Larry get into a series of unfortunate events, consisting of blood-splattered mayhem and a dungeon pub crawl.

==== Monsters Gonna Monster ====
As Fairyland enters a new era, Gert embarks on more gore-splattered Gert-y goodness.

== Collected editions ==
=== Trade paperbacks ===
Title	Material collected	Published date	ISBN
I Hate Fairyland Vol. 1: Madly Ever After	I Hate Fairyland vol. 1 #1–5	April 26, 2016	ISBN 978-1-63215-685-3
I Hate Fairyland Vol. 2: Fluff My Life	I Hate Fairyland vol. 1 #6–10	December 13, 2016	ISBN 978-1-63215-887-1
I Hate Fairyland Vol. 3: Good Girl	I Hate Fairyland vol. 1 #11–15	October 24, 2017	ISBN 978-1-5343-0330-0
I Hate Fairyland Vol. 4: Sadly Never After	I Hate Fairyland vol. 1 #16–20	September 4, 2018	ISBN 978-1-5343-0680-6
I Hate Fairyland Vol. 5: Gert's Inferno	I Hate Fairyland vol. 2 #1–5	June 27, 2023	ISBN 978-1-5343-2598-2
I Hate Fairyland Vol. 6: Last Gert Standing	I Hate Fairyland vol. 2 #6–10	January 16, 2024	ISBN 978-1-5343-9785-9
I Hate Fairyland Vol. 7: In the Mean Time	I Hate Fairyland vol. 2 #11–15	September 24, 2024	ISBN 978-1-5343-7617-5
I Hate Fairyland Vol. 8: Happy End Game	I Hate Fairyland vol. 2 #16–20	August 12, 2025	ISBN 978-1-5343-3215-7
I Hate Fairyland Vol. 9: Back On My Bull Ship	I Hate Fairyland #41–45	March 10, 2026	ISBN 978-1-5343-3595-0
I Hate Fairyland Vol. 10: Monsters Gonna Monster	I Hate Fairyland #46–50	July 15, 2026	ISBN 978-1-5343-3581-3
The Unbelievable Unfortunately Mostly Unreadable and Nearly Unpublishable Untold Tales of I Hate Fairyland!	The Untold Tales of I Hate Fairyland! vol. 1 #1–5: Collected Substack issues #1–7 and #13–17.	February 7, 2024	ISBN 978-1-5343-9825-2

=== Hardcovers ===
Title	Material collected	Published date	ISBN
I Hate Fairyland Book One	I Hate Fairyland vol. 1 #1–10	December 12, 2017	ISBN 978-1-5343-0380-5
I Hate Fairyland Book Two	I Hate Fairyland vol. 1 #11–20, I Hate Image: FCBD Special #1	September 17, 2019	ISBN 978-1-5343-1248-7
I Hate Fairyland: The Whole Fluffing Tale: Compendium One	I Hate Fairyland vol. 1 #1–20, I Hate Image: FCBD Special #1	July 23, 2024	ISBN 978-1-5343-9772-9

== Reception ==
According to the review aggregation website Comic Book Roundup, the first issue of I Hate Fairyland received an average score of 8.6/10 from critics, based on 21 reviews. National Public Radio's Etelka Lehocky described it as "a great palate cleanser for anyone who's recoiled from pink-princess politics" and praised "Young's clever storytelling". IGN included it as one of the "Top Comics to read this week".

== In popular culture ==
On May 1, 2018, a Fortnite Battle Royale character skin inspired by I Hate Fairyland's Gert, "Zoey", was made available as an Epic Outfit, obtainable as a reward from Tier 47 of Season 4's Battle Pass, part of the "Sweet Tooth" set.

I Hate Fairyland has been cited by French cartoonist François Locufier as the inspiration for his webtoon series Geraldine & Mona, which began development as a fan-fiction sequel to Sadly Never After, featuring Gert having a daughter.
