= Adventures in Oz =

Collection of graphic novels set in the land of Oz

Adventures in Oz is a collection of five graphic novels by Eric Shanower set in the Land of Oz. They were originally published separately from 1986 to 1992. The first four, The Enchanted Apples of Oz (1986), The Secret Island of Oz (1986), The Ice King of Oz (1987), and The Forgotten Forest of Oz (1988) were published by First Comics. The fifth, The Blue Witch of Oz, was published by Dark Horse Comics in 1992. The hardcover edition contained an extensive appendix by Shanower about his Oz comic work, including previously unseen artwork and comics, as well as alternate endings to some stories.

The five volumes were collected, revised, and published in an omnibus edition by IDW Publishing in 2006. Recently, the collection has been split into two pocket-size volumes called Little Adventures in Oz.
