= M. C. Gainey =

American actor (born 1948)

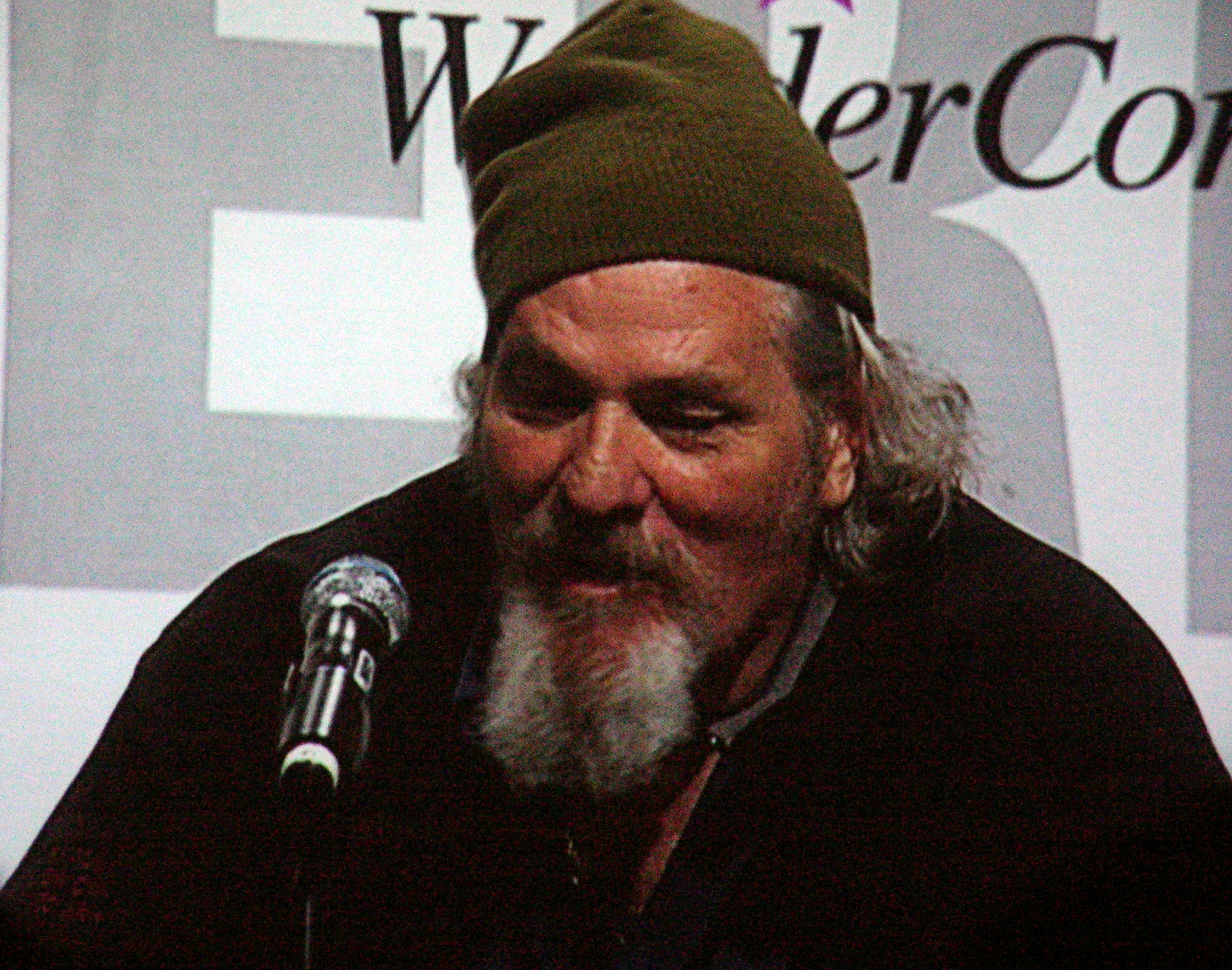
- Gainey at WonderCon 2010
- Born: Michael Connor Gainey; January 18, 1948 (age 78); Jackson, Mississippi, U.S.
- Other names: M.C. Gainey, Mike Connor Gainey, Michael Connor Gainey
- Occupation: Actor
- Years active: 1954–present
- Spouse: Kim Novicki (m. 2002)

Michael Connor Gainey (born January 18, 1948) is an American character actor best known for playing Tom Friendly in Lost (2005–2008), and appearing in The Mighty Ducks (1992), Con Air (1997), The Dukes of Hazzard (2005), Wild Hogs (2007), and Love Ranch (2010).

Gainey received some media notoriety for performing a full frontal nude scene in the film Sideways (2004).

== Early life ==
Gainey was born in Jackson, Mississippi. In the early 1970s, he attended the American Conservatory Theater in San Francisco, California, with Ken Hixon. Prior to this, he attended the University of Southern Mississippi. He worked as a mortician's apprentice before he decided to study acting. He served in the U.S. Army and was the company mailman at his post in Chakmakli, Turkey in 1969.

== Career ==
In 1981, he made his big-screen debut in Herbert Ross's musical Pennies from Heaven starring Steve Martin and Bernadette Peters. Since the early 1980s, he has been in over 50 films, including Two Idiots in Hollywood (1988), The Mighty Ducks (1992), The Fan (1996), Breakdown (1997), Con Air (1997), Terminator 3: Rise of the Machines (2003), The Cooler (2003), Sideways (2004), Are We There Yet? (2005), The Dukes of Hazzard (2005), Wild Hogs (2007) and Mr. Woodcock (2007).

Gainey was one of the stars of the short-lived series Against the Law and played Tom Friendly on the series Lost. He also played murderous drug dealer Bo Crowder in season one on the hit FX series Justified. He has guest starred on over 40 television shows, including The Dukes of Hazzard, Knight Rider, Designing Women, The Adventures of Brisco County, Jr., Walker, Texas Ranger, Criminal Minds, CSI, Girl Meets World, Cheers, Days of Our Lives, The X-Files, Desperate Housewives, The Mentalist, Burn Notice, and The Fresh Prince of Bel-Air.

In 2003, Gainey appeared in The Last Cowboy, playing the role of Lance Henriksen's friend, along with Bradley Cooper and Jennie Garth. In 2004, Gainey appeared as a cuckolded husband in full frontal nudity in the award-winning arthouse film Sideways. He played Kurtz / The Wizard in the controversial road-revenge short film Apocalypse Oz. In 2007, he appeared in Mr. Woodcock, Wild Hogs, and Unearthed. In 2010, he appeared in Love Ranch and voiced the Captain of the Palace Guard in Tangled and he reprised this role for the TV series Rapunzel's Tangled Adventure in 2017–2020. In 2012, he appeared in Quentin Tarantino's film Django Unchained.

== Personal life ==
He has been married to his wife Kim Novicki since 2002.

On being typecast, Gainey stated:

With a face like this, there aren't a lot of lawyers or priest roles coming my way. I've got a face that was meant for a mug shot and that's what I've been doing for the past thirty years. If I play a cop, it's always a racist cop, or a trigger-happy cop or a crooked cop - but by and large I play cowboys, bikers, and convicts.

On his favorite of the villainous characters he has played, Gainey said:

"Swamp Thing" in Con Air. In a movie that has so many villains, take a look at my character closely - not that it supports the weight of a careful examination - and you'll see that I don't really get in anyone's face, I don't really kill anyone, I'm not really a bad guy - I'm just a guy who likes to fly. He made the mistake of landing his plane full of controlled substances in the wrong place and finds himself in the system. In terms of bad guys though, the character I played in Breakdown was a very bad human being. There's nothing redeeming about that character.

== Film ==
Year	Title	Role	Notes
1975	Hard Times	Party Guest At Mansion	(uncredited)
1979	Time After Time	London Bobby	(credited as Mike Gainey)
1981	Pennies from Heaven	Policeman	
1982	Frances	Reporter / Publicist / Photographer	
1984	Starman	Cop #2	
1986	Ratboy	Police Officer	
1986	Soul Man	Man In Cell	
1987	Fatal Beauty	Detective Barndollar	
1988	Spellbinder	Brock	
1988	Two Idiots in Hollywood	Sergeant Albert	
1989	An Innocent Man	Malcolm	
1989	Caddie Woodlawn	Hankinson	
1992	The Mighty Ducks	Lewis	
1992	Ulterior Motives	Max	
1992	Leap of Faith	"Tiny"	
1993	Geronimo: An American Legend	Unafraid Miner	
1995	Citizen Ruth	Harlan	
1996	One Tough Bastard	Hank	
1996	The Fan	Man Behind Man	
1996	The Secret Agent Club	Jock Dad	
1997	Breakdown	Earl	
1997	Con Air	Earl "Swamp Thing" Williams	
1998	Meet the Deedles	Major Ed Flowers	
1998	Ringmaster	Trucker	
1999	Happy, Texas	Bob Allen Maslow	
1999	The Haunting	Large Man	
1999	Tyrone	Sheriff Haggard	
2001	Diary of a Sex Addict	Theatre Manager	(Video)
2002	Run Ronnie Run!	Hark Trellis	
2002	Highway	Steven	
2002	The New Guy	Clem	
2002	The Country Bears	Roadie	
2003	The Cooler	Highway Officer	
2003	King of the Ants	Coach Rack	
2003	Terminator 3: Rise of the Machines	Roadhouse Bouncer	
2003	Wonderland	Detective Billy Ward	
2004	Club Dread	Hank	
2004	Sideways	Cammi's Husband	
2004	Wake Up, Ron Burgundy: The Lost Movie	The Bartender	(Video)
2005	At Last	Earl Singleton	
2005	Are We There Yet?	Al	
2005	The Dukes of Hazzard	Sheriff Rosco P. Coltrane	
2006	Two Tickets to Paradise	Barbosa	
2006	The TV Set	Hutch	
2006	Beerfest	Priest	
2006	Relative Strangers	Spicer	
2006	Apocalypse Oz	Kurtz	(Short)
2007	Wild Hogs	Murdock	
2007	Unearthed	Rob Horn	
2007	The Death and Life of Bobby Z	"Boom-Boom"	
2007	Mr. Woodcock	Hal	
2009	Tripping Forward	Jim Rose, Interviewer	
2009	All About Steve	Norm, The Truck Driver	
2010	The Not Goods Anthology: This Is Absolutely Not Good	M.C. Not Good	(Video short)
2010	Love Ranch	Warren Stamp	
2010	Tangled	Captain of The Guard	
2010	Trim	Ron	
2011	Leave	Gus	
2012	Stolen	Donald Hoyt	
2012	The Babymakers	Officer Malloy	
2012	Django Unchained	John "Big John" Brittle	
2012	Ghost Quake	Principal Alger Danforth	
2013	The Pardon	Gibbs Duhon	
2015	Father's Day	Dad	(Short)
2015	The Week	Doc	
2016	Greater	Coach Ford	
2017	The Corridor Defended	The Bartender	(Short)
2018	Shifting Gears	D.H. "Dirty Harry" Hawkins	
2018	Town of Samhain	Marquee (voice)	(Short)
2018	Boogeyman Pop	Ed	
2018	Deadman Standing	Hugh Anderson	
2019	The Orchard Girl	"Wheelchair"	(Short)
2019	Bit	Enoch	
2020	Emperor	Randolph Stevens	
2021	The Cleaner	Doug	
2025	Last Train to Fortune	TBA	Post-production

== Television ==
Year	Title	Role	Notes
1981	Dynasty	Worker	Episode: "The Bordello"
1982	Bring 'Em Back Alive	Miller	Episode: "Escape from Kampoon"
1982	Father Murphy	Foreman	Episode: "The Reluctant Runaway: Part 2"
1982	Happy Days	Elmo	Episode: "Hi Yo, Fonzie Away"
1982	Knight Rider	Jason Keller	Episode: "A Plush Ride"
1982	The Dukes of Hazzard	Peters	Episode: "Bad Day in Hazzard"
1982	The Blue and the Gray	Sykes	Episode: "Part 1"
1983	T. J. Hooker	Earl Banks	Episode: "Too Late for Love"
1983	Wizards and Warriors		Episode: "The Kidnap"
1983	The A-Team	C.W. Watkins	Episode: "A Nice Place to Visit"
1983	Night Partners	Rapist	TV movie
1983–1988	Simon & Simon	Clarence "Buzz-Saw" Cooder / Mr. Bad / Dexter	3 episodes
1984	Blue Thunder	Saver	Episode: "Arms Race"
1984	Hart to Hart	Hayward	Episode: "The Shooting"
1984	Whiz Kids		Episode: "The Sufi Project"
1984	The New Mike Hammer	"PeeWee"	Episode: "Too Young to Die"
1985	Street Hawk	Frankie Monroe	Episode: "The Arabian"
1985	The Rape of Richard Beck	Sonny	TV movie
1986	Cheers	Irving	Episode: "Suspicion"
1986	Knight Rider	Jerry Nash	Episode: "Out of the Woods"
1988	Frank Nitti: The Enforcer		TV movie
1988	Police Story: Gladiator School	Rafferty	TV movie
1988	Something Is Out There	Deputy	Episode: "The Keeper"
1988–1991	Designing Women	T. Tommy Reed / Junior	3 episodes
1989	CBS Summer Playhouse	Benger	Episode: "Elysian Fields"
1989	Major Dad	Zaff	Episode: "Just Polly & Me, and the Kids Make Five"
1989	The Young Riders	Gabe Colter	Episode: "Ten-Cent Hero"
1989–1990	Hardball	"Moose" Dobson	2 episodes
1990	Doctor Doctor	Darren DuFine	Episode: "Doctors and Other Strangers"
1990	Hunter	Magruder	Episode: "Street Wise: Part 2"
1990	El Diablo	"Bebe" Patterson	TV movie
1990–1991	Against the Law	J.T. "Miggsy" Meigs	17 episodes
1991	Matlock	Marty Jensen	2 episodes
1991	The Commish	Si Prince	Episode: "Nothing to Fear But Fear"
1991	L.A. Law	Jack Markell	Episode: "Monkey on My Back Lot"
1992	Night Court	Eddie "The Machete"	Episode: "Shave and a Haircut"
1992	Ned Blessing: The True Story of My Life	Jack "One-Armed Jack" Sample	TV movie
1992	Raven	"Fat Boy" Ochoa	Episode: "Return of the Black Dragon"
1993	The Fresh Prince of Bel-Air	Luther	Episode: "Robbing the Banks"
1993	Danger Theatre	George "Mad Dog" Munson (segment: "Vengeance in the Grass")	Episode: "Comes a Searcher/Vengeance in the Grass"
1993	The Adventures of Brisco County, Jr.	"Big" Smith	2 episodes
1993	Hearts Afire	M.C.	Episode: "The Stud Club"
1993–2000	Walker, Texas Ranger	Craig / Tingley	2 episodes
1994	Renegade	Mick Russell	Episode: "The Posse"
1994	Dead Man's Revenge		TV movie
1994	Blind Justice	"Bull"	TV movie
1994	Thunder Alley	Mr. Ohrt	Episode: "Give 'Em Hell, Bobbi"
1994	Touched by an Angel	"Smoky"	Episode: "The Heart of the Matter"
1994	New Eden	Thor	TV movie
1995	Women of the House	Moving Man #2	Episode: "Miss Sugarbaker Goes to Washington"
1995	Marker	Floyd	Episode: "High & Wild"
1995	Naomi & Wynonna: Love Can Build a Bridge	Gaylon	TV movie
1995	Misery Loves Company	"Scar"	Episode: "Uneasy Rider"
1995	M.A.N.T.I.S.	Cabin Dweller	Episode: "Ghost of the Ice"
1996	Silk Stalkings	Lucien "Bayou" Boudreau	Episode: "Uncivil Wars"
1996	Death Benefit	D.K. Graham	TV movie
1996	Don't Look Back	"Red"	TV movie
1996	The Lazarus Man	Everett Henderson	Episode: "The Angel Maker"
1997	Nash Bridges	Neil Gallow	Episode:: "Payback"
1998	The Pretender	Sharpton	Episode: "Amnesia"
1998	Last Rites	"Quinn" Quint	TV movie
1998	Buddy Faro	Dyer	Episode: "Get Me Cody Swift"
1999	The Magnificent Seven	Earl	Episode: "The New Law"
1999	Pensacola: Wings of Gold	Clyde Donaldson	Episode: "Sortie"
1999	Horse Sense	"Twister"	TV movie
2001	The X-Files	Bo Taylor	Episode: "Vienen"
2001	Dead Last	Hagerty	Episode: "Teen Spirit"
2001	UC: Undercover	"Cubby"	Episode: "Zero Option"
2002	Days of Our Lives	Chauncey "Big Chauncey" O'Hanrahan	5 episodes
2003	The Last Cowboy	Amos Russell	TV movie
2003	The Pitts	Curtis	Episode: "Ticket to Riot"
2003	CSI: Crime Scene Investigation	Frank Maddox	Episode: "Homebodies"
2005	Criminal Minds	Moretti	Episode: "Derailed"
2005–2008	Lost	Tom Friendly	19 episodes
2008	Bones	Braxton Smalls	Episode: "The Man in the Mud"
2008	The Young and the Restless	Dick Dentner	2 episode
2008	Cold Case	Coach Walters '08	Episode: "Glory Days"
2009	Burn Notice	Jacob Orr	Episode: "Seek and Destroy"
2009	Life	William Ford	Episode: "I Heart Mom"
2009	ER	Darrion Walters	Episode: "Shifting Equilibrium"
2010	Happy Town	Sheriff Griffin Conroy	6 episodes
2010	Human Target	Donnelly	Episode: "The Wife's Tale"
2010–2011	Justified	Bo Crowder	6 episodes
2010–2015	The Mentalist	Pete Barsocky / Pete	3 episodes
2011	Enlightened	Rick	Episode: "The Weekend"
2012	The Finder	Pete Steck	Episode: "Eye of the Storm"
2012	Haunted High	Danforth	TV movie
2013	Glee	Santa	Episode: "Previously Unaired Christmas"
2014	Revolution	General Frank Blanchard	2 episodes
2014	The Walking Dead	Walker	Episode: "Slabtown" (uncredited)
2014–2015	Kingdom	Rick	6 episodes
2015	Married	Ed	Episode: "Thanksgiving"
2015	Girl Meets World	Pappy Joe	2 episodes
2016	The Magicians	Stanley	2 episodes
2016	Lopez	Broughton Goodson	2 episodes
2016	Maron	Gus	2 episodes
2016	American Gothic	Al Jenkins	Episode: "The Oxbow"
2017	Outcast	Bob "Junkyard Bob" Caldwell	8 episodes
2017	Speechless	Dominic "Dom"	Episode: "S-H-- SHIPPING"
2017–2018	Rapunzel's Tangled Adventure	Captain of The Guard	14 episodes
2018	Riverdale	Papa Poutine	
2018	9-1-1	Charlie	Episode: "Under Pressure"
2018	The Conners	Group Leader	Episode: "The Separation of Church and Dan"
2019	The Passage	Bob	Episode: "Last Lesson"
2019	Bosch	Ryan Rodgers	5 episodes
2020	A Teacher	Wyatt Wilson	3 episodes
2023	Tacoma FD	McSwiggins	Episode "Gone Dutch"
2026	The Boroughs	Tim Hauser	Episode: "Forbidden Fruit"

== Video games ==
Year	Title	Role	Notes
2008	Lost: Via Domus	Tom Friendly (voice)	
