= The Wizard of A.I.D.S. =

1987 short musical play

The Wizard of A.I.D.S.: Aware Individuals Deserving Survival is a short musical play created by Michael Barto and collaborators in 1987 to teach young adults about HIV/AIDS prevention and safe sex in an entertaining and accessible way. They formed the AIDS Educational Theatre in Chicago to perform the play, renamed to HealthWorks Theatre in 1992.

== Productions ==
The play was conceived by a group of students from the University of Iowa Theatre Department, led by graduate student Michael Barto. They performed it in parks and gay nightclubs throughout Iowa City, before being issued a cease-and-desist letter for using licensed music from the film. The group worked with a local community group which supplied rainbow-colored condoms, which were distributed to the audience at the end of each performance. Barto brought the piece to Chicago to revise and relaunch it using original music.

Aiming for an audience of teenagers and young adults, HealthWorks toured the piece to high schools and college campuses across the country, occasionally sparking controversy from parents, clergy, and other community members. Although Dorothy chooses abstinence as her prevention strategy, the play frankly discusses condom usage, and the Wicked Witch of Unsafe Sex is killed by being suffocated with a giant condom.

Barto died in 1995 from complications of AIDS. By that time, the play had been staged more than 700 times. The touring productions continued through at least 2000. Some performances took place on World AIDS Day or during AIDS Awareness Week. In 2001, a St. Louis theatre company performed the play in collaboration with HealthWorks.

In 2023, students at the University of Kansas staged the play, which was the first production since the early 2000s.

== Synopsis and themes ==
The play, which parodies the 1939 film The Wizard of Oz, is an AIDS education piece that follows Dorothy Gale and her friends from the "Land of AIDS" as they battle the "Wicked Witch of Unsafe Sex" and learn how to prevent the spread of HIV. Along the way, the Scarecrow learns to use his brain to make good choices to avoid infection, the Tin Man finds it in his heart to feel compassion for people with the disease, and the Cowardly Lion realizes the courage to face his fears about becoming ill. The musical plays on the popularity of the film among gay men (see Judy Garland as a gay icon), a group at increased risk of HIV infection. During and after the play, cast members distribute HIV-prevention literature and condoms to the audience.

== Related work ==
The Wizard of A.I.D.S. was among several stage productions that responded to the AIDS pandemic in the 1980s and 1990s. These included The AIDS Show (1984), Falsettoland (1990), Elegies for Angels, Punks and Raging Queens (1990), Zero Patience (1993), and Rent (1996).

It is one of many adaptations of The Wonderful Wizard of Oz that use the narrative and characters from the 1939 film for parody and allegory.

HealthWorks also developed and produced a humorous play for younger students, What's So Big About AIDS?, that provided age-appropriate education about prevention of HIV transmission without explicit detail.

== Grants and awards ==
The MacArthur Foundation contributed $80,000 to HealthWorks between 1992 and 1998 to support operations. In 1995, the Michigan AIDS Fund granted $10,000 to support 20 performances of the show in Detroit-area schools. Other performances were funded by other local nonprofits, community groups, and individuals.

The Chicago Department of Public Health gave HealthWorks an award for excellence in prevention education in 2000.

== See also ==
- LGBTQ culture in Chicago
