= Age of Bronze (comics) =

American comic book series

- Age of Bronze issue 12 cover art; copyright 2001 by Eric Shanower

Publication information
- Publisher: Image Comics
- No. of issues: 34 (as of April 2019)

Creative team
- Created by: Eric Shanower
- Written by: Eric Shanower
- Artist: Eric Shanower

Collected editions
- A Thousand Ships: ISBN 1-58240-200-0
- Sacrifice: ISBN 1582403600
- Betrayal, Part One: ISBN 9781582408453
- Betrayal, Part Two: ISBN 9781607067573

Age of Bronze is an American comics series by writer/artist Eric Shanower retelling the legend of the Trojan War. It began in 1998 and is published by Image Comics.

== Overview ==
The series aims to be true to all literary traditions, from Homer's Iliad to Shakespeare's Troilus and Cressida, as well as to the archaeology of the Bronze Age Aegean. When complete it is projected to comprise seven volumes.

== Publications ==
34 issues, four trade paperback collections and two specials have been published as of 2015.

Collected volumes

- A Thousand Ships (2001, ISBN 1-58240-200-0) collects issues 1 to 9, in which Helen, wife of the king of Sparta, is abducted by the Trojan prince Paris, and the Greeks gather their armies for war in response.
- Sacrifice (2004, ISBN 1-58240-360-0) collects issues 10 to 19, in which the progress of the Greek army is held up, until their king, Agamemnon, pays a debt he owes to the gods.
- Betrayal, Part One (2008, ISBN 978-1-58240-845-3) collects issues 20–26, in which Agamemnon's fleet sails to Troy and his envoys negotiate with King Priam.
- Betrayal, Part Two (2013, ISBN 978-1-60706-758-0) collects issues 27–33.

Specials and one-shots

- Age of Bronze: Special, published in 1999, provides backstory, telling of the curse on Atreus and his sons, Agamemnon and Menelaus.
- Age of Bronze: Behind the Scenes, published in 2002, gives an insight into Shanower's research and working methods.

== Status ==
After a six-year hiatus, issue 34 was published in 2019, the first to be in color. Individual issues will henceforth be solely digital except a handful printed to fulfill existing print subscriptions. No further print subscriptions will be accepted. Book collections are being reissued in color. Plans are to publish two issues a year.

== Awards ==
Shanower won the Eisner Award for best writer/artist in 2001 and 2003, and was nominated for the Ignatz Award for outstanding artist in 1999, for his work on Age of Bronze.
