= The Hidden Prince of Oz =

2000 novel

- Author: Gina Wickwar
- Illustrator: Anna-Maria Cool
- Cover artist: Anna-Maria Cool
- Language: English
- Series: The Oz Books
- Genre: Fantasy
- Publisher: International Wizard of Oz Club
- Publication date: 2000
- Publication place: United States
- Media type: Print (Hardcover)
- Pages: 308
- ISBN: 978-1-930764-00-2
- OCLC: 46377567

The Hidden Prince of Oz is a novel written by Gina Wickwar and illustrated by Anna-Maria Cool. The book is an entry in the series of Oz books by L. Frank Baum and his many successors.

The publication of the book was timed to coincide with the centennial of the original Oz book, The Wonderful Wizard of Oz (as was also true of Edward Einhorn's Paradox in Oz and Dave Hardenbrook's The Unknown Witches of Oz). It was the winner of the Club's Centennial book contest, which received over 100 entries in 1998.

Wickwar supplies her book with a range of puns, verbal tricks, and imaginative elements: Silica Valley and its inhabitants, plus the Magnetic Field, the Draw Bridge, a Babbling Brook and Caterwauling Cataracts, Snap Dragons, and Dragon Flies.

== The plot ==
Wickwar introduces a new child protagonist, Emma Lou, an orphan from Arizona, a tomboy and baseball pitcher. She is carried to Oz by the agency of Chief Thundercloud, an animated wooden Indian. There, Emma Lou falls in with a crowd of old and new Oz characters including the Glass Cat, Princess Vitrea, Ketzal (an animated feathered boa), and a blue parrot named Beak. (Indeed, Wickwar deliberately crowds her book with characters, in imitation of Baum's The Lost Princess of Oz. Paddy, the rainbow-painting leprechaun in search of his lost pot of gold, is one of many.)

The characters have to confront the machinations of Zeebo the Sorcerer. With the aid of familiar figures like the Wizard, the Tin Woodman, the Sawhorse, and Polychrome the fairy, Emma Lou and her friends unravel the mystery of the missing Prince of the Blue Mountain, Vitrea's love.
