= The Unknown Witches of Oz =

2000 novel written by Dave Hardenbrook

- First edition
- Author: Dave Hardenbrook
- Illustrator: Kerry Rouleau
- Cover artist: Kerry Rouleau
- Language: English
- Series: The Oz Books
- Genre: Fantasy
- Publisher: Galde Press
- Publication date: 2000
- Publication place: United States
- Media type: Print (Hardcover)
- Pages: 240
- ISBN: 978-1-880090-23-7
- OCLC: 43365797
- Dewey Decimal: 813/.6 21
- LC Class: PS3558.A6188 U5 2001

The Unknown Witches of Oz: Locasta and the Three Adepts is a 2000 novel written by Dave Hardenbrook, with illustrations by Kerry Rouleau.

The publication of The Unknown Witches of Oz was timed to coincide with the centennial of the original Oz book, The Wonderful Wizard of Oz (as was also true of Gina Wickwar's The Hidden Prince of Oz and Edward Einhorns's Paradox in Oz). Hardenbrook's novel is the first volume of a planned trilogy.

== The witches ==
Locasta is a name similar to "Locusta" that Baum provided to the Good Witch of the North in his 1902 dramatization of The Wonderful Wizard of Oz. The Three Adepts are characters that Baum introduced in his final Oz book, Glinda of Oz — though Hardenbrook changes their names and particulars, making them Locasta's granddaughters.

== The plot ==
Locasta, the Good Witch of the North, is forced out of Oz by the evil witch Mombi. Locasta solicits help to return to Oz, from a boy named Dan, a sixteen-year-old orphan she meets at the Los Angeles Public Library. Back in Oz, she learns that the land is in danger of conquest by a constellation of evil forces, including the Nome King, a genie named Taarna, and the demons and witches of Whaqoland. Locasta joins with Glinda and Princess Ozma, and the Adepts, to foil the villains and restore the moral order.

In a notable departure from the practice of earlier writers on Oz, Hardenbrook creates a teenaged protagonist as a romantic interest for Ozma.

== Conceptual frame ==
Hardenbrook goes farther than many previous Oz authors in an attempt to provide a contemporary conceptual framework for the fictional world of Oz. In a Prologue titled "The Story So Far," Hardenbrook specifies that Oz exists in a parallel universe, in "a galaxy very like our own Milky Way" with "a star virtually identical to our sun...." The star has "a planet that corresponds to Earth" — though it differs in possessing "two extra moons and a polychromatic ring system...." The planet contains continents and archipelagoes that include "Dodgesonia" and "Geiselgea" as well as "Baumgea."

Hardenbrook goes on to summarize the narrative background of the Oz mythos — the fairy queen Lurline and the whole scope and structure of magic, wizards and sorceresses crucial to Baum's fantasy — before he gets to his story in earnest.

== Tone ==
Hardenbrook writes in a more modern and ironic vein than the traditional Oz authors did; he describes Ozma as "the only world leader with an unwavering one-hundred-percent job approval rating!" His malevolent genie comes out of a spray can. Allusions to Bill Clinton, Rush Limbaugh, and environmentalism also occur.

The author is a computer adept, and spices his story with elements of technology and virtual reality — Virtual Sprites and a Virtual Forest.
