= Gert's Inferno =

Novel written by Skottie Young

- Date: November 16, 2022 (Part 1); December 21, 2022 (Part 2); January 18, 2023 (Part 3); February 15, 2023 (Part 4); March 15, 2023 (Part 5)
- No. of issues: 5
- Main characters: Gertrude "Gert"; Rotwald Rat; Virgil
- Publisher: Image Comics

Creative team
- Writers: Skottie Young
- Artists: Brett Bean
- Letterers: Nate Piekos of Blambot
- Creators: Skottie Young; Jason Howard

Original publication
- Published in: I Hate Fairyland
- ISBN: 978-1-5343-2598-2

Chronology
- Preceded by: Sadly Never After
- Followed by: Last Gert Standing

Gert's Inferno is a five-issue comic book story arc written by Skottie Young and drawn by Brett Bean as the fifth volume of I Hate Fairyland. Published by Image Comics, the story revolves around an adult Gert as she is hired by a billionaire to rescue his son from Fairyland.

== Summary ==
The comic follows an adult Gertrude as she is hired by billionaire William Wiggins to return to Fairyland, rescue his son, and conquer the realm for mankind. Teaming up with Fairyland denizen Rotwald Rat and guided by the demonic ancient Roman poet Virgil, Gert traverses the hell of Dante's Inferno in search of the road back to the realm of magic.

== Reception ==
Gert's Inferno received good reviews.

== Collected edition ==
Title	Material collected	Published date	ISBN
Gert's Inferno	I Hate Fairyland vol. 2 #1–5	June 27, 2023	ISBN 978-1-5343-2598-2
