= Ghostquake =

- Poster
- Written by: Paul A. Birkett; Anthony C. Ferrante
- Directed by: Jeffrey Lando
- Starring: Danny Trejo
- Country of origin: United States
- Original language: English

Production
- Running time: 84 minutes

Original release
- Network: Syfy
- Release: August 25, 2012

Ghostquake (also known as Haunted High) is a 2012 American made-for-television horror film produced by Syfy. The film was directed by Jeffrey Lando and written by Paul A. Birkett and Anthony C. Ferrante. The film stars Danny Trejo and M. C. Gainey. It follows a group of high school students trying to escape the wrath of a few ghastly spirits, following an earthquake at their school, Holloman High School. Mysterious school cleaner Ortiz, who has been protecting the academy in secret, steps forward to help the youths. Ghostquake first aired on Syfy on August 25, 2012.

== Plot ==
At the New England–based private educational institution Holloman High School, curious teacher Myers (Ricky Wayne) is interrogating student Quentin Smith (Jonathan Baron) on his apparent ancestral ties with former headmaster Alger Danforth (M. C. Gainey), a notorious murderer and cult leader. He brings Quentin to the school's basement to question him in private. Quentin is shown a few historical artifacts pertaining to Danforth. They slip from his hands accidentally and in the process, a 1950s time capsule is knocked open, allowing the ghost of a deceased Danforth and his female assistant trapped in it to escape. The rest of the academy are unaware of this incident, except for the school's janitor Ortiz (Danny Trejo), who is informed of Danforth's escape, but gets locked up in the janitor's closet by Danforth's hench-woman. Ortiz presents himself as knowledgeable about Danforth and the other ghosts, he reveals himself to be the academy's secret guardian who has been investigating the actions of Danforth's cult, which caused his sister's death, for decades.

Meanwhile, Quentin has barely managed to escape. He hurriedly informs seven of his friends about the situation and requests their help. Danforth and his hench-woman use their supernatural powers to tackle their efforts. Ultimately most of them die, except for Quentin and his girlfriend Whitney (Lauren Pennington). They free Ortiz from his imprisonment. Just then, Danforth and his assistant arrive. The hench-woman is eliminated with the help of Ortiz's sister's spirit but Danforth possesses Quentin after killing Ortiz. Now a ghost, Ortiz engages in a scuffle with Danforth by forcing him out of Quentin. As they fight, Quentin dissolves Danforth's ring, which enables him to survive, causing him to disappear into nothingness. Peace is restored and operations at Holloman resume as normal.

== Cast ==
- M. C. Gainey as Alger Danforth, Ghost of A Deceased Headmaster
- Danny Trejo as Ortiz, The Janitor
- Jonathan Baron as Quentin Smith
- Lauren Pennington as Whitney Douglas
- Marc Donato as Colt
- Shawn C. Phillips as Blake Hemmiway
- Chelsea Morgan Thomas as Amber
- Gabe Begneaud as Dean
- Dana Gourrier as Coach Janine Hoover
- Mike Kimmel as Principal Lou Spiro
- Griff Furst as Garland
- Danielle Greenup as China
- Brett Lapeyrouse as Dex
- Stephanie Fischer as Kimberly
- Misty Marshall as Female Acolyte, Ghost and Danforth's Assistant
- Amanda Phillips as Marisol, Ghost and Ortiz's Sister
- Charisma Carpenter as Librarian
- Jaren Mitchell as Stu
- Sergio Figueroa as Rob
- Ricky Wayne as Myers
- Jeffery Scott Lando as Angry Guy

== Production ==
Danny Trejo signed on as Ortiz, "a janitor who is secretly the kick-butt guardian of the school." M. C. Gainey played the main antagonist of the film, Danforth, "a demonic dead headmaster". Charisma Carpenter made a cameo appearance as a school librarian. Jonathan Baron was cast as Danforth's grandson and Holloman student Quentin.

Jeffrey Lando directed the film. Paul A. Birkett and Anthony C. Ferrante were in charge of writing the story. Griff Furst was in charge of production for Syfy.

== Release and reception ==
International sales for Ghostquake were handled by Echo Bridge International. The film was released on DVD on January 25, 2013. Daniel King of Horrornews.net concluded that the film "is a hokey but fun movie that wins you over by virtue of its tongue-in-cheek attitude and zesty performances."
