= Eric Shanower =

American cartoonist (born 1963)

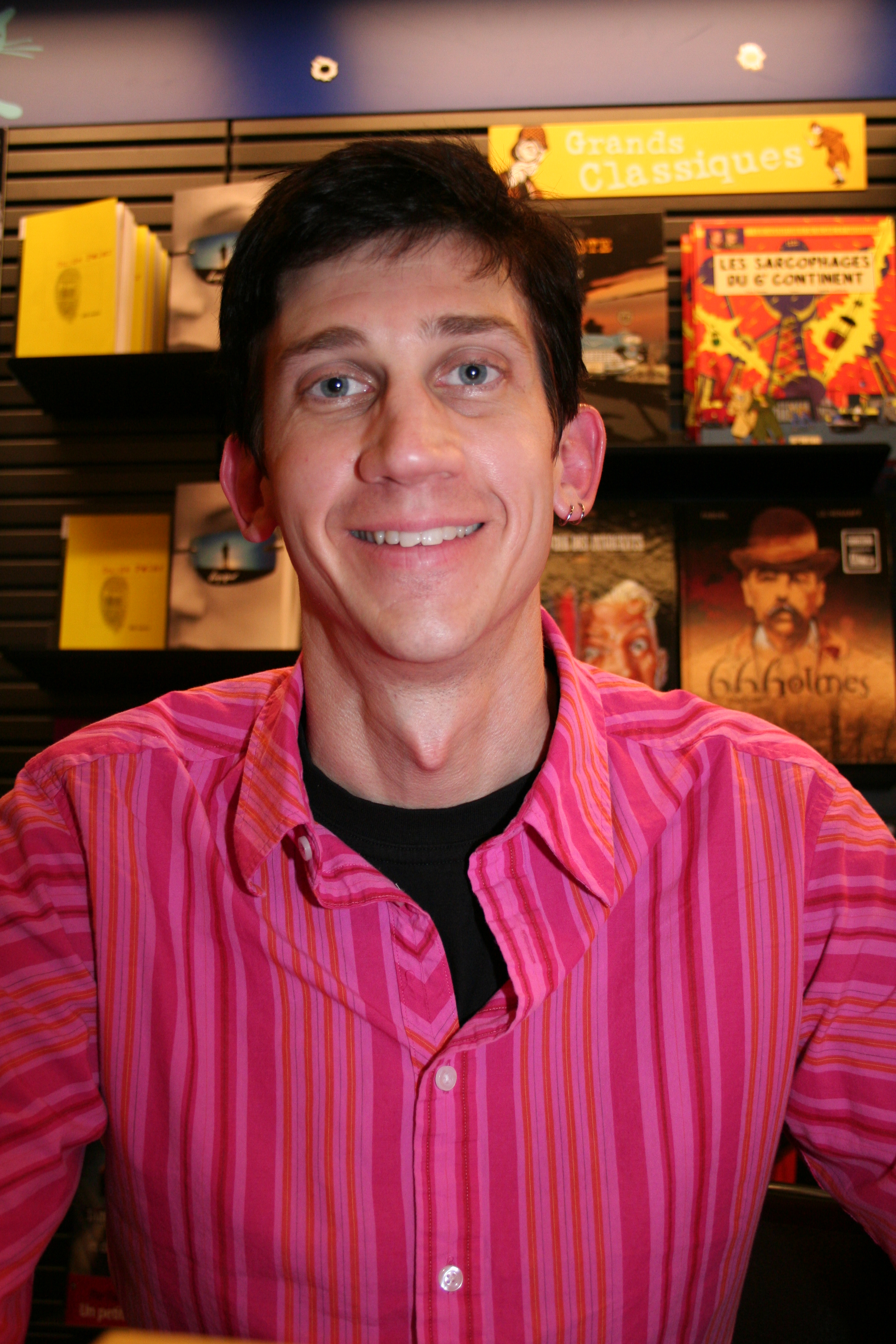
- Eric Shanower in Paris in February 2007
- Born: October 23, 1963 (age 63) Key West, Florida
- Awards: Russ Manning Award 1987; Eisner Award 2001, 2003, 2010, 2011, 2015; Gran Guinigi, 2006

Eric James Shanower (born October 23, 1963) is an American cartoonist, best known for his Oz novels and comics, and for the ongoing retelling of the Trojan War as Age of Bronze.

== Early life ==
Eric Shanower was born on October 23, 1963. Upon his graduation from Novato High School in 1981, he attended The Kubert School in Dover, New Jersey, graduating in 1984.

== Career ==
Shanower's first major published works were the Oz graphic novels, which are The Enchanted Apples of Oz, The Secret Island of Oz, The Ice King of Oz, The Forgotten Forest of Oz, and The Blue Witch of Oz released by First Comics and Dark Horse Comics between 1986 and 1992. They are collected in a single large volume titled Adventures in Oz, published by IDW.

He has also written and illustrated a full-length Oz novel, The Giant Garden of Oz, and a collection of short Oz stories, The Salt Sorcerer of Oz. As an illustrator, he has worked on books by Oz historians, including The Wicked Witch of Oz by Rachel Cosgrove Payes, The Rundelstone of Oz by Eloise Jarvis McGraw, The Runaway in Oz by John R. Neill, and The Third Book of Oz by L. Frank Baum. Other Oz projects include his illustrations for Paradox in Oz and The Living House of Oz by Edward Einhorn.

He wrote adaptations of L. Frank Baum's first six original Oz novels for Marvel Comics, illustrated by artist Skottie Young. The first, The Wonderful Wizard of Oz was released in a hardcover collection on September 2, 2009. The follow-up, The Marvelous Land of Oz' began in November 2009 as an 8 issue monthly comic series, while the third mini i.e. Ozma of Oz, began in November 2010. The fourth and fifth books, Dorothy and the Wizard in Oz and The Road to Oz, were also subsequently adapted by Shanower and Young for Marvel Illustrated. The collaboration concluded with their adaptation of the sixth book, The Emerald City of Oz. In 2020, the six Oz graphic novels were rereleased in three collected volumes.

Shanower also wrote the comic series Little Nemo: Return to Slumberland for IDW. The first issue was released August 20, 2014.

=== Age of Bronze ===
In February 1991, Shanower "conceived the idea to tell the story of the Trojan War in the comics medium," aiming to combine "the myriad versions of the Greek myth with the archaeological record" to showcase the tale in "authentic historical detail." This aim has been manifested in the ongoing comic book Age of Bronze, debuting in late 1998 from Image Comics. As of 2018, the series has been collected in four (of a projected seven) volumes:

- A Thousand Ships
- Sacrifice
- Betrayal Part One
- Betrayal Part Two

The seven volumes in their entirety will cover the complete story of the war. The books contain extensive bibliographies, for the story, the setting and historical Troy, drawing on the excavation work Heinrich Schliemann (et al.) and the publication Studia Troica. The book does not depict the gods or any mythical beings, with Chiron portrayed as a human rather than a centaur. Similarly, the Nymphs are portrayed as human priestesses rather than as supernatural beings.

=== Other work ===
Shanower has also drawn a number of one shot comics, such as Ed Brubaker's Prez "Smells Like Teen President" (for DC Comics) and An Accidental Death (also written by Brubaker) published by Fantagraphics in 1993. For Marvel's Epic line, he illustrated The Elsewhere Prince (1990), based on characters created by the French cartoonist Moebius. His work has appeared in magazines throughout the USA and Europe as well as in books and on TV.

== Awards ==
Shanower won Eisner Awards for Best Writer/Artist in 2001 and 2003, won a Gran Guinigi for Best Serialized Comic in 2006, and was nominated for the Ignatz Award for Outstanding Artist in 1999 for his work on Age of Bronze. The Wonderful Wizard of Oz miniseries written by Shanower, illustrated by Skottie Young, won two Eisners in 2010, for Best Limited Series or Story Arc and Best Publication for Kids.

His short story "Happily Ever After" was part of How Beautiful the Ordinary: Twelve Stories of Identity, an anthology of LGBTQ short stories for young adults published in 2009. The book was a Lambda Literary Award finalist for LGBT Children's/Young Adult literature.

== Personal life ==
Shanower lives in San Diego with his partner David Maxine, who runs Hungry Tiger Press, a publisher of Oz books, Oz-related comics and compact discs, which the two started in 1994.
