= The Wizard of Oz (arcade game) =

Arcade coin pusher game

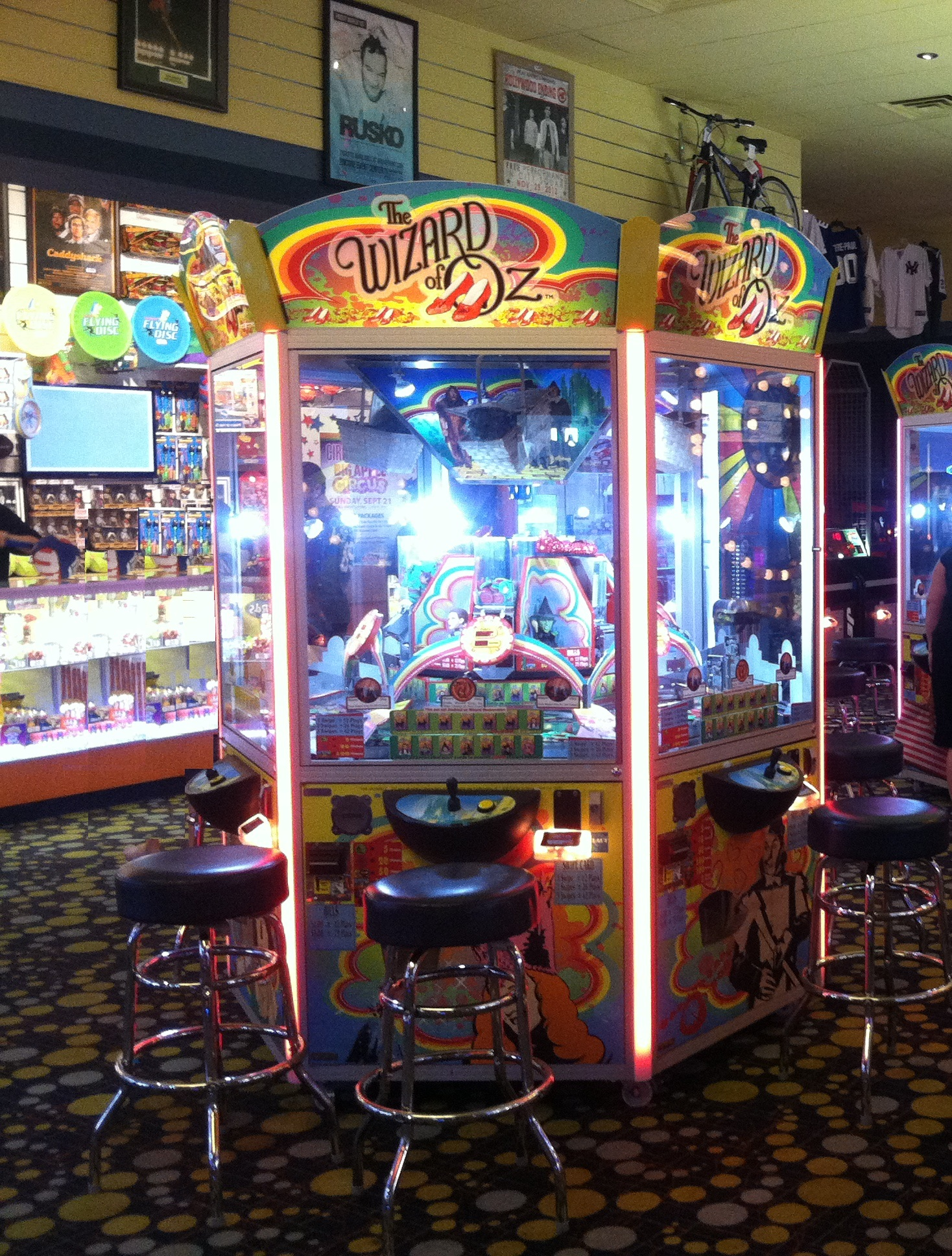
A Wizard of Oz pushing game

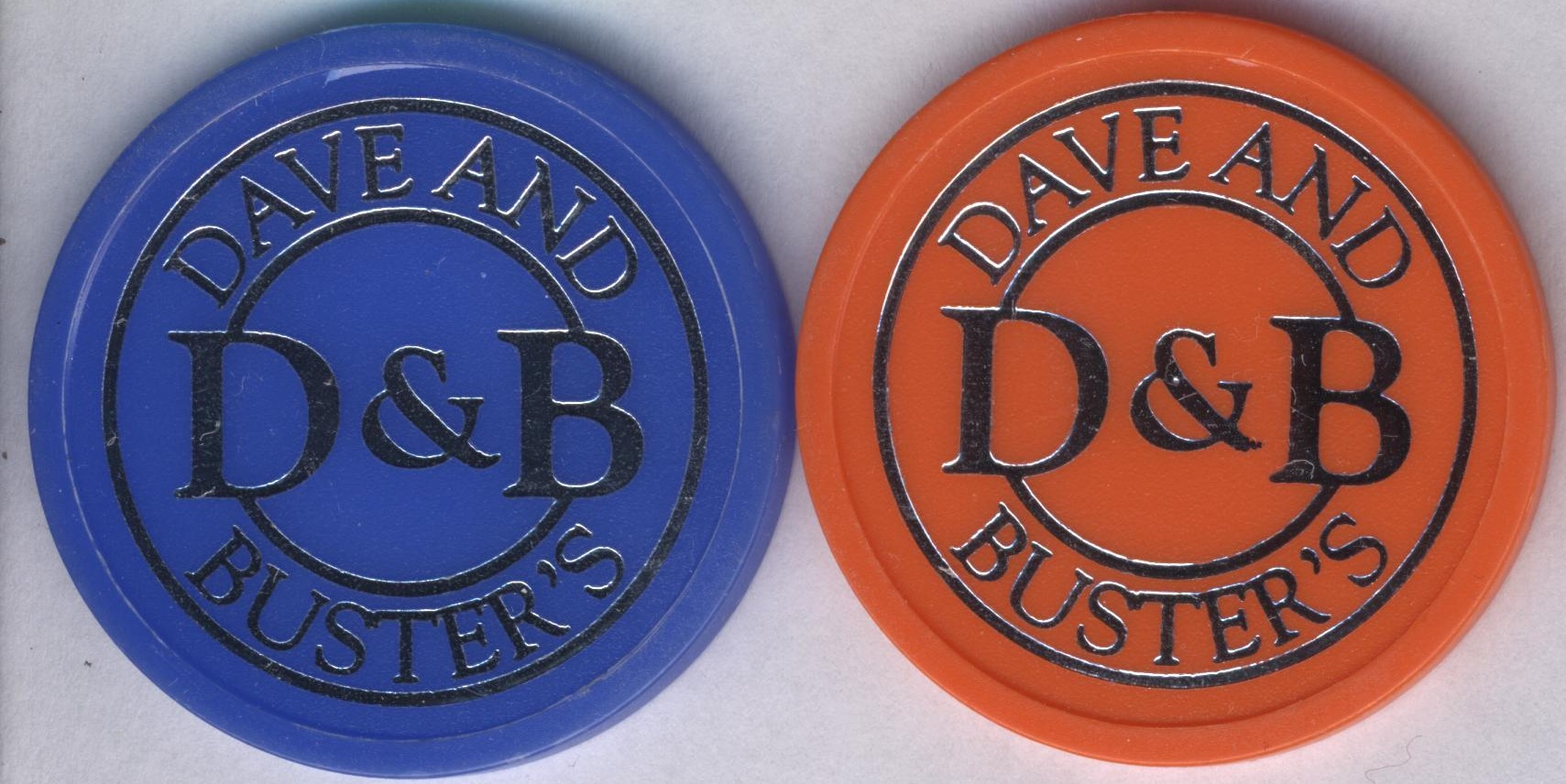
Different chips awarded from the game. Some are stamped by the arcade hosting the machine and others are stamped by the manufacturer's web address.

The Wizard of Oz is an arcade coin pusher game based on the 1939 film that awards token chips and cards that are redeemable for prizes. The player shoots coins into the machine which drops chips and cards. The player collects the cards and chips that can be redeemed later for prizes. The coins are retained by the machine. Most arcades that have this game will award a jackpot for collecting the entire series of cards. It can be played by up to six players. The game is developed by Elaut Belgium and released in the fall of 2010. According to the company's press release, the game was very well received by players and amusement centers.

== Cabinet ==
"Blackbeard's Bounty" - Same pusher machine with different graphics

Each side of the machine features one of the following characters:

- Dorothy
- Scarecrow
- Tin Man
- The Cowardly Lion
- The Wicked Witch of the West
- Good Witch of the South
- Toto (Rare card)

In addition, the cabinet can be retrofitted with different themes and graphics other than the Wizard of Oz. In eastern countries, this is featured as the Mistral. Recently, Elaut released Ticket Circus — a version that keeps both the coins and tokens inside the machine. The tokens in this version are different shapes and there are no cards. In the summer of 2016 Dave & Busters rolled out exclusive Star Trek themed pushers that dispense the blue and orange tokens and Star Trek cards.

== Card and chips ==
The game is meant to only dispense cards and chips. Coins that fall are normally pumped back into the gun, but some arcades award points for coins that make it through to the prize slot. The game awards a bonus spin on a small light-up wheel once every 30 shots. Each spot on the wheel could earn the player between 5 up to 50 extra shots. The standard chips are:

- Green (Emerald City)
- Red (Ruby slippers)

Most arcades, such as Dave & Buster's and Main Event use their own chips and determine point value for each chip. Dave & Buster's awards the same point value for their chips, although they have two colors: Navy blue and Orange.

== See also ==
- The Wizard of Oz (pinball)
