= Gale: Yellow Brick Road =

2026 horror film by Daniel Alexander

- Theatrical release poster
- Directed by: Daniel Alexander
- Written by: Matthew R. Ford
- Based on: The Wonderful Wizard of Oz by L. Frank Baum
- Produced by: Tenisha White
- Starring: Chloë Crump; Laura Kay Bailey; Karen Swan
- Edited by: Daniel Alexander
- Production companies: Chilling; Daniel Alexander Films; Maggy Road Pictures; Pretty Hate Productions
- Distributed by: Fathom Entertainment
- Release date: 11 February 2026
- Running time: 106 minutes
- Country: United Kingdom
- Language: English

Gale: Yellow Brick Road is a 2026 British independent horror fantasy film directed by Daniel Alexander in his directorial debut, from a screenplay by Matthew R. Ford. The film is a horror reimagining of L. Frank Baum's children fantasy novel The Wonderful Wizard of Oz. It stars Chloë Crump, Laura Kay Bailey and Karen Swan. The film is about Emily and her grandmother Dorothy who always warned her about the danger of the place called Oz.

== Plot ==
A troubled artist named Emily Gale has been experiencing reoccurring nightmares involving her grandmother and a mysterious woman named Dorothy. Due to her fascination with these nightmares, she ends up isolating herself from the world, drawing imagery from her dreams.

One day, she discovers a journal that seemingly belonged to her mother. The journal contains various sketches of a magical realm called Oz, along with a phone number for a mental institution. Fascinated by the discovery, Emily goes to the mental institution to potentially discover what happened to her mother and to find answers about her family's past.

However, after confronting the sinister head of the institution, a sudden thunderstorm forces Emily to stay inside the asylum. Overtime, the lines between reality and fantasy start to blur as she starts to discover she has a dangerous connection with Dorothy and Oz.

== Cast ==
- Chloë Crump as Emily Gale
- Laura Kay Bailey as Dr. Appleton/Mombi
- Hassan Taj as Munchkin
- Karen Swan as Dorothy Gale
- Rachel Hassett as Evil Woman
- Dara Abasuté as Linda
- Sarah Feltham as Patches
- H.C.A. Taylor
- Vivien Weigand as Young Emily Gale

== Production ==
The film is directed by Daniel Alexander in his first feature film. The film stars Chloë Crump, Laura Kay Bailey, Hassan Taj, Rachel Hassett, Dara Abasuté, Karen Swan, H.C.A. Taylor and Sarah Feltham. In November 2025, Fathom Entertainment announced the film and its release date.

== Release ==
The film had a one day theatrical release on 11 February 2026, under Fathom Entertainment.

== Reception ==
Grant Hermanns of Screen Rant gave the film a negative review and a 2 out of 10 rating and wrote: The creepy imagery in the first act improperly sells just how dull the movie ultimately ends up being for the majority of its overlong runtime, and while its snail-like pacing and lackluster acting fail to make its psychological themes land with anything more than a mute thud.

Paul Lê of Bloody Disgusting gave the film a rating of 2/5 and he wrote: It is too overwhelming and weighs on everything. The lack of cool-downs and breathers, plus the hasty pacing, indeed ensures this film is as nightmarish as possible; however, in the long run, not much of this nightmare will probably be remembered once it is over.

Kevin Taft of We Live Entertainment gave the film a rating of 4 out of 5 saying: Alexander and co-writer Matthew R. Ford have crafted an unusual, horror-inflected take on Oz, leaning into mood, trauma, and fractured memory rather than whimsy. It's familiar, but refracted through grief and unease. As an indie production, the film stretches its scope impressively without ever fully pulling back the curtain. Visually, it looks more expensive than it likely was.
