= Apocalypse Oz =

- Film poster
- Written by: Ben Telford
- Produced by: Bradley Warden
- Cinematography: Kev Robertson
- Production company: CineClash Productions
- Release date: 2006
- Running time: 25 minutes
- Country: United States
- Language: English/ Vietnamese

Apocalypse Oz is a 2006 short film. It is based on the novels Heart of Darkness (1899) by Joseph Conrad and The Wonderful Wizard of Oz (1900) by L. Frank Baum. The script is a hybrid of the two classic films Apocalypse Now (1979) and The Wizard of Oz (1939), and uses only dialogue from these films.

== Plot ==
Dorothy Willard, an Amerasian product of the Vietnam War, is tired of living with her abusive foster parents in Kansas. Dorothy decides that "there's no horror like home" and accepts a dream mission that takes her deep into the desert to hunt down and "terminate with extreme prejudice" an insane, renegade US Army colonel - codenamed 'The Wizard'.

== Cast ==
- M. C. Gainey as Kurtz, "The Wizard"
- Alexandra Gizela as Dorothy Willard
- Billy Briggs as Hunk, a stoner hitchhiker and version of The Scarecrow
- Brian Poth as Doorman
- Kevin Glikman as Kilgore, a cop and a version of the Wicked Witch
- Tammy Garrett as Giang
- Amy Lyndon as Em
- Don Paul as Henry

== Reception ==
Film Threat's review said "'Apocalypse Oz' had the ability to ruin it from the very beginning but Telford's direction, convincing performances and an original concept make this worth watching." Quiet Earth described it as a "kinetic punk-rock gem of a film ... something entirely new [that] attempts to explore new ways of telling stories."

Twitch Film wrote, "With its brief run time Apocalypse Oz feels too slight to really succeed, more like an experiment than a finished piece of work but there's certainly something to be said for knowing how to leave an audience wanting more rather than overextending a concept."
