= The Wonderful Wizard of Oz (2009 comics) =

2009 eight-issue comic book limited series

- Cover for The Wonderful Wizard of Oz #1. Art by Skottie Young.

Publication information
- Publisher: Marvel Comics
- Schedule: Monthly
- Format: Limited series
- Genre: Fantasy
- Publication date: February – September 2009
- No. of issues: 8
- Main character(s): Dorothy Gale; Scarecrow; Tin Woodman; Cowardly Lion

Creative team
- Written by: Eric Shanower; L. Frank Baum (novel)
- Artist: Skottie Young
- Letterer: Jeff Eckleberry
- Colorist: Jean-Francois Beaulieu
- Editor(s): Nathan Cosby; Lauren Henry; Ralph Macchio; Joe Quesada; Lauren Sankovitch

Collected editions
- Hardcover: ISBN 0-7851-2921-9

The Wonderful Wizard of Oz (2009) is an eight-issue comic book limited series adapting the L. Frank Baum novel of the same name. The series was written by Eric Shanower with art by Skottie Young and published by Marvel Comics.

== Plot summary ==
When Kansas farm girl Dorothy Gale and her pet dog Toto are swept away to the magical Land of Oz in a cyclone, she fatally flattens the Wicked Witch of the East, liberates a talking Scarecrow, meets a Tin Woodman, a Cowardly Lion and is hailed by everyone as a great sorceress! But all Dorothy really wants to know is: how does she get back home again?

== Collected editions ==
The series has been collected into a single volume:

- The Wonderful Wizard of Oz (192 pages, hardcover, September 2009, ISBN 0-7851-2921-9, softcover, March 2010, ISBN 0-7851-2922-7, June 2010, ISBN 0-7851-4590-7)

== Reception ==
The Marvel Oz series has been met with very positive reviews, praising the art, character design and overall layout.

IGN gave the issues of the series an average rating of 9.2 out of 10.

It won the 2010 Eisners for Best Limited Series or Story Arc and Best Publication for Kids.

== Sequels ==
The series has been followed by adaptations of The Marvelous Land of Oz, Ozma of Oz, Dorothy and the Wizard in Oz, Road to Oz, and The Emerald City of Oz by the same creative team. The series did not continue beyond the sixth Oz book.

== See also ==
- The Wizard of Oz (comics), for other adaptations
