= Dorothy (comics) =

Comic book series

- Cover of Dorothy Volume 1

Publication information
- Publisher: Illusive Arts Entertainment, LLC
- Format: Limited series
- Genre: Fantasy
- Publication date: May 2004 – February 2007
- No. of issues: 7
- Main character: Dorothy Gale

Creative team
- Created by: Greg Mannino; Mark Masterson
- Written by: Greg Mannino
- Artist: Mark Masterson

Collected editions
- Volume 1: ISBN 0-9769407-0-1

Dorothy is a comic book created by Greg Mannino and Mark Masterson and published by Illusive Arts Entertainment, LLC. Dorothy is based on the Wizard of Oz books, originally by L. Frank Baum. The series was published erratically for 4 years before ending on a cliffhanger. The official website for the series is inactive.

Dorothy is different from many other comics because it is not drawn, but rather, actress/model Catie Fisher is photographed on a green screen and the world is digitally created around her. This style of comic which is illustrated with photographs is known as Fumetti or "photo comics".

In 2006, Dorothy was added to the Oz Museum in Wamego, Kansas.

== Characters ==
- Dorothy Gale (played by Catie Fisher). First appearance: Issue #1.
- Graybones (partially CG/partially Greg Mannino). First appearance: Issue #1.
- The Queen (played by Catie Fisher). First appearance: Issue #1.
- Auntie Em (played by Jennifer Fisher). First appearance: Issue #2.
- Flying Monkeys (digitally created). First appearance: Issue #2.
- To-2 (prop, issues 2–8). First appearance: Issue #2.
- The Good Witch, a.k.a. "Thirsty guy" (primarily CG).
- Scarecrow (prop, issues 2–8). First appearance: Issue #2.
- The Prince (played by Greg Mannino).
- Malo, "The Prince's fighter" a.k.a. "the guy with the ray gun" (played Bryan Champ).
- The Prince's wife (played by Holly Alvarez).
- Commander Stern (played by Shawn Blackburn).
- 10Man, a.k.a. "The Robot" (CG model). First appearance: Issue #6.
- The Munchkins (primarily digitally created).
- The Scientist (played by Bill Fodrie).
- The Scientist's Wife (played by Ginevra Fodrie).
- Major Tegus (played by J.J. Young).

== Staff ==
There are many people responsible for Dorothy.

- Mark Masterson writer.
- Greg Mannino Creator, producer, lead artist for Issues 1–4.
- Ray Boersig producer/lead artist for Issues 5–7.
- Ray Boersig lead CG artist.
- Theo Panousopoulus CG artist.
- Anna Warren Boersig (remarried in 2010 and is now Anna Warren Cebrian) executive producer.
- Catie Fisher stars as Dorothy.

The cover art for Issue 3 was by Dave Dorman.

== Bibliography ==
- Dorothy #1–2 starring Catie Fisher, written by Mark Masterson, directed and produced by Greg Mannino.
- Dorothy #3 starring Catie Fisher, written by Mark Masterson, special 3D effects by Theo Panousopoulos, directed and produced by Greg Mannino.
- Dorothy #4 starring Catie Fisher, written by Mark Masterson, directed by Theo Panousopoulos, created and produced by Greg Mannino.
- Dorothy #5 starring Catie Fisher, written by Mark Masterson, directed and produced by Ray Boersig.
- Dorothy #6 starring Catie Fisher, written by Mark Masterson, art by Ray Boersig, directed by Greg Mannino.
- Dorothy #7 starring Catie Fisher, written by Mark Masterson, art by Ray Boersig, story by Greg Mannino.

=== Collected editions ===
The first four issues of the series was collected into a trade paperback:

- Dorothy: Volume 1 (September 2005 Illusive Arts Entertainment ISBN 0-9769407-0-1)
