= Skottie Young =

American comics artist

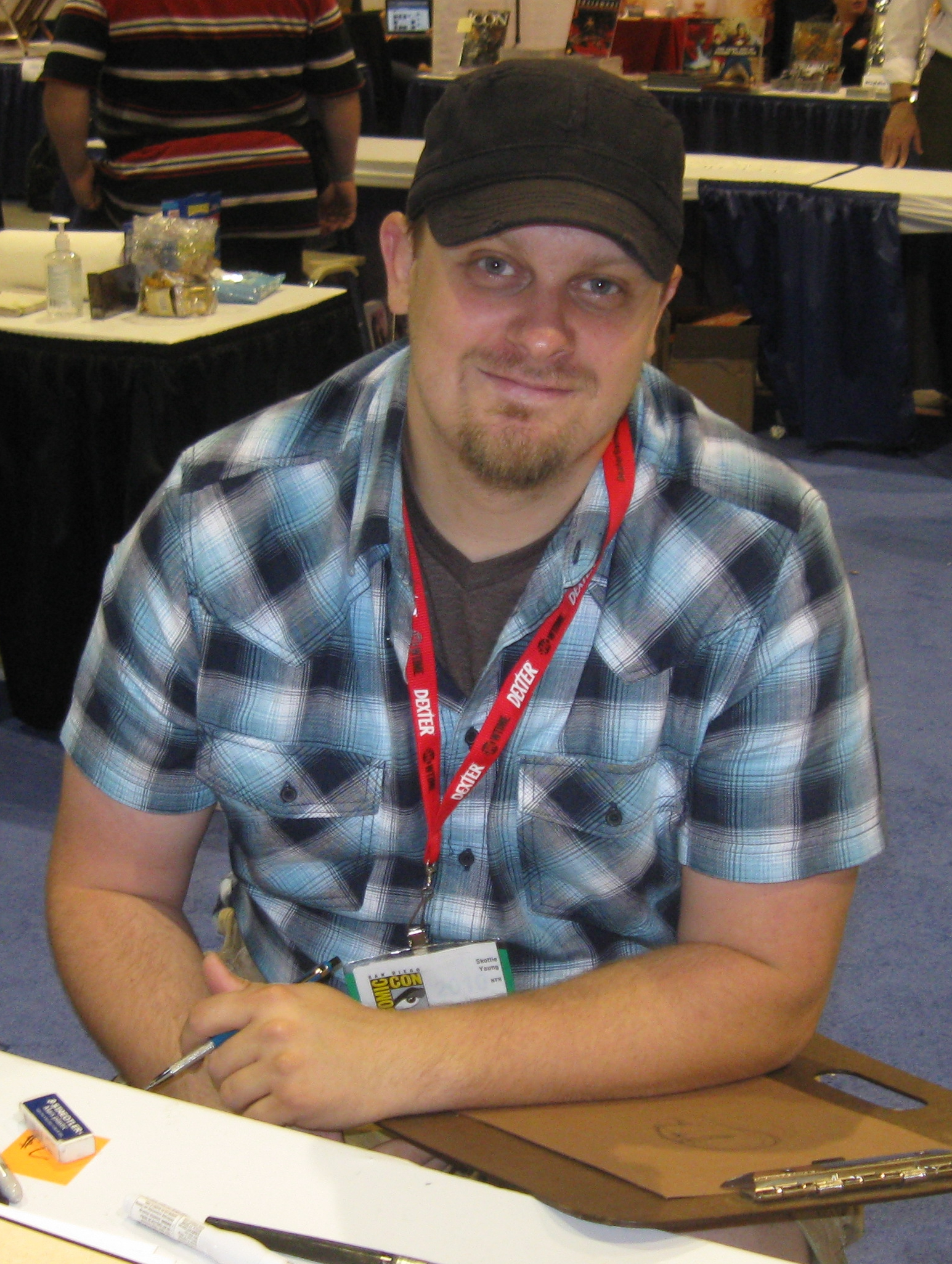
- Young at San Diego Comic-Con in 2010
- Born: March 3, 1978 (age 48) Fairbury, Illinois, U.S.
- Area: Artist
- Awards: Inkwell Award for The All-in-One Award (2013)

Skottie Young (born March 3, 1978) is an American comic book artist, children's book illustrator and writer. He is best known for his work with various Marvel Comics characters, his comic book adaptations of L. Frank Baum's Oz books with Eric Shanower, his I Hate Fairyland comic book series, and a series of novels with Neil Gaiman, Fortunately, the Milk.

== Career ==
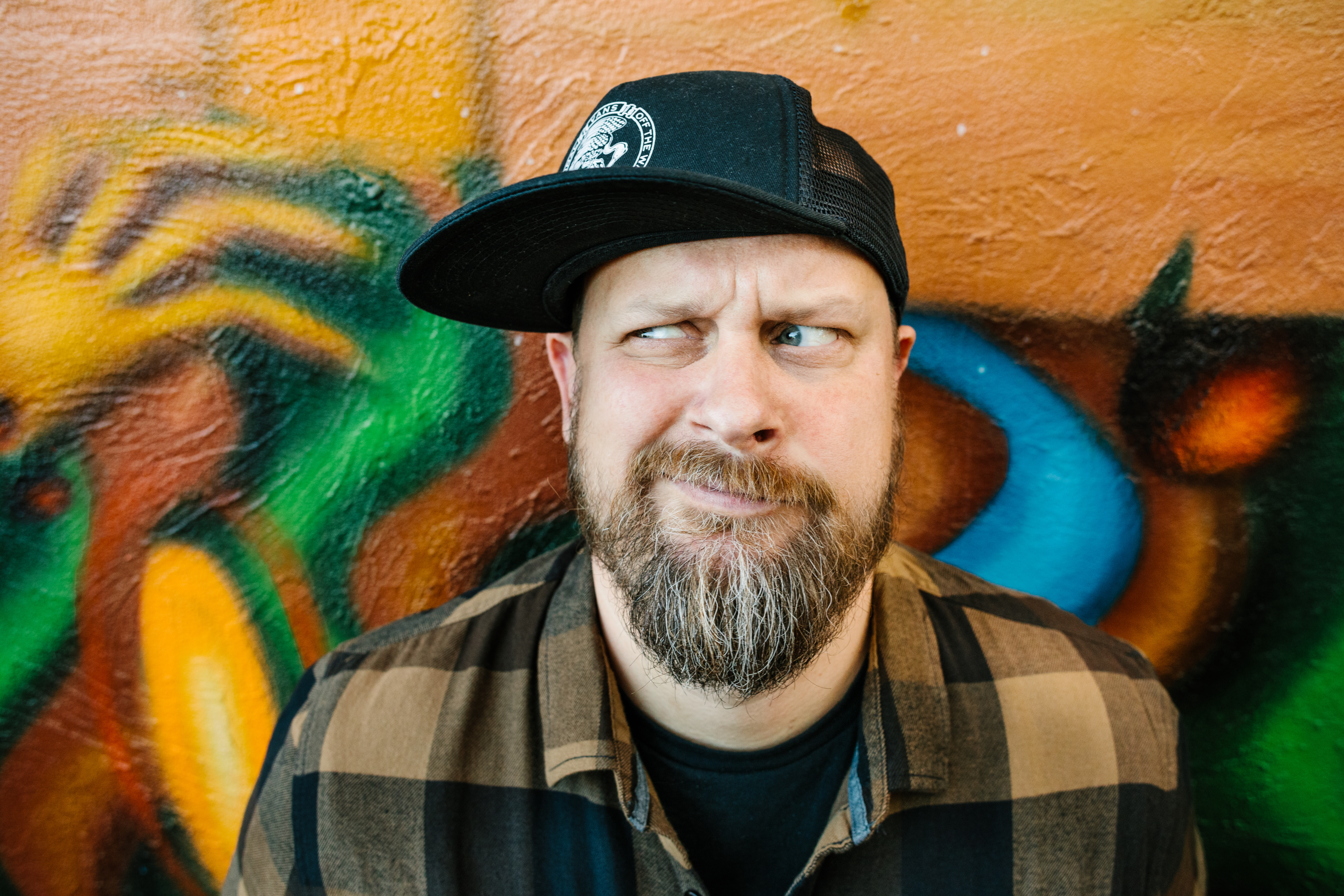
Skottie Young in 2019

Young moved from Tennessee to Chicago in 2000 at which time he began working for Marvel Comics. Early projects included illustrating the Spider-Man: Legend of the Spider-Clan mini-series as part of the Marvel Mangaverse as well as the Human Torch and the New X-Men for which he also wrote an issue.

Young illustrated a six issue New Warriors mini-series released beginning in June 2005, written by Zeb Wells featuring the team as the stars of a reality TV show, leading into Civil War.

He has drawn covers for many books including Cable & Deadpool, Spider-Man, Deadpool and Iron Man along with a popular series of Baby Variant covers for dozens of Marvel titles.

He has gained critical acclaim for his work on the New York Times Best Selling and Eisner Award winning series The Wonderful Wizard of Oz published by Marvel Comics. He and collaborator Eric Shanower adapted the next five books in the Oz series, but there are currently no plans to continue with any of the eight books remaining in Baum's original series.

Young wrote and drew a Rocket Raccoon solo series for Marvel Comics starting in July 2014. Though the series precedes the release of the Marvel Studios film Guardians of the Galaxy, there was no mandate to respect the movie's continuity. Young commented at the time "I think it's going to have a connection to that nostalgic feeling for 'Looney Tunes,' that old, animated flavor where everything wasn't squeaky clean, you know? Daffy Duck would get his bill blasted off with double barrel shotguns... That's what I grew up watching, and being able to play around with that in this hyper-superhero intergalactic universe will be a lot of fun."

From October 2015 to July 2018, Young wrote and illustrated the first 20 issues of I Hate Fairyland, a comic book series that he created. The series was published through Image Comics.

In 2018, As part of the Fresh Start relaunch of Marvel's titles, he became writer of Deadpool. In June 2019, Marvel Comics published The Marvel Art Of Skottie Young.

In August 2021, Young launched a Substack newsletter, where he announced that I Hate Fairyland would be returning from its hiatus. Future issues of the series, which will resume publication through Image Comics, will be written by Young and illustrated by Brett Parson, while additional side stories illustrated by other artists will be released as timed exclusives through Young's Substack before later publication.

== Personal life ==
Young currently lives in Prairie Village, Kansas with his wife, Casey McCauley and their two children.

== Bibliography ==
- Cable & Deadpool #35–50 (cover art)
- New X-Men (2004 series) #37–43
- Human Torch #1–6
- Venom #14–18
- New Warriors: Reality Check #1–6
- Runaways/X-Men: Free #1
- Spider-Man: Legend of The Spider Clan #1–4
- Oz series
  - The Wonderful Wizard of Oz #1–8
  - The Marvelous Land of Oz #1–8
  - Ozma of Oz #1–8
  - Dorothy and the Wizard in Oz #1–8'
  - The Road to Oz #1–6
  - The Emerald City of Oz #1–5
- Ultimate Comics: Spider-Man #150
- Rocket Raccoon #1–11
- I Hate Fairyland (vol. 1) #1–20
  - Madly Ever After (vol. 1)
  - Fluff My Life (vol. 2)
  - Good Girl (vol. 3)
  - I Hate Fairyland – I Hate Image (one-shot)
  - Sadly Never After (vol. 4)
- Fortunately, the Milk, with Neil Gaiman
- Empress #1 (variant cover art)
- The Unbelievable GwenPool #1 (variant cover art)
- Deadpool #1–15
- Twig #1–5
- Bully Wars #1–5
- Middlewest #1–20
- Strange Academy #1–18
- The Me You Love in the Dark #1–5
- Ain't No Grave #1–5
- Strange Academy: Finals #1–6
- Untold Tales of I Hate Fairyland (vol. 1) #1–16 and (vol. 2) #1–5
- I Hate Fairyland (vol. 2) #1–20
  - Gert's Inferno (vol. 5)
  - The Last Gert Standing (vol. 6)
  - In The Mean Time (vol. 7), collects issues #11–15
