= The Marvelous Land of Oz (comics) =

Comic book adaptation of the L. Frank Baum novel

Publication information
- Publisher: Marvel Comics
- Schedule: Monthly
- Format: Limited series
- Genre: Fantasy
- Publication date: January – September 2009
- No. of issues: 8
- Main character(s): Tip/Princess Ozma; Jack Pumpkinhead; Sawhorse; Scarecrow; Tin Woodman

Creative team
- Written by: Eric Shanower; L. Frank Baum (novel)
- Artist(s): Skottie Young
- Letterer(s): Jeff Eckleberry
- Colorist(s): Jean-Francois Beaulieu
- Editor(s): Nathan Cosby; Lauren Henry; Ralph Macchio; Joe Quesada; Lauren Sankovitch

Collected editions
- Hardcover: ISBN 0-7851-2921-9

The Marvelous Land of Oz is a comic book series published by American company Marvel Comics based on The Marvelous Land of Oz book written by L. Frank Baum. It is an eight issue limited series written by Eric Shanower, penciled by Skottie Young, and colored by Jean-Francois Beaulieu. It is a sequel to a previous adaptation of The Wonderful Wizard of Oz from the same team.

== Plot summary ==
A boy named Tip is being raised by an old witch named Mombi who mistreats him. One day Tip decides to build a Pumpkin headed man named Jack Pumpkinhead made of wood to scare Mombi. She uses a magic powder on Jack and brings him to life. Mombi tells Tip that she is going to turn him into a marble statue and Tip decided to run away. He leaves with Jack taking Mombi's magic powder with him. They come upon a saw-horse and Tip uses the powder to bring the horse to life so that Jack may ride him. Jack and the saw-horse run ahead and arrive at the kingdom of Oz before Tip does and are introduced to the Scarecrow who now is the emperor of Oz. Meanwhile, Tip runs into General Jinjur who is organizing a war against the emperor of Oz so that she can become the new leader of Oz and change the role of women. Jinjur's army conquers the city and Jinjur is crowned.

Tip meets up with the Scarecrow, Saw-horse, and Jack after the city is conquered and the Scarecrow suggests that they ask the Tin Woodman who rules the Winkies for help. Mombi offers to assist Jinjur in defeating the Tin Woodman and the Scarecrow if Tip is handed over to her and Jinjur agrees. The Scarecrow, Jack, Tip, the Tin Woodman, and the Saw-horse are on the way back to the Emerald City when the run into the Woggle-Bug who joins them. Mombi uses her magic to try to deter them from the Emerald City, but they are helped by the Queen of the field mice and her subjects. The group manages to scare Jinjur and her army out of the throne room, only to discover that they were now trapped in the throne room surrounded by Jinjur and her army. They craft a sort of flying machine made with the head of deer called the Gump and fly out of the Emerald City. The group gets caught in a giant nest on their way to seek help from Glinda the good. They find a box of wishing pills and wish their out returning on the journey to Glinda.

When they arrive, Glinda tells them there is a girl named Ozma who is the true heir to the throne of Oz who can take the throne from Jinjur. Glinda believes that the during his rule, the Wizard of Oz asked Mombi to hide Ozma so that his throne would not be taken. Glinda agrees to help and brings her army to Oz. Mombi and Jinjur try to disguise a soldier as Mombi, but Glinda sees through the plan. Glinda and Jinjur enter into an agreement that Glinda may search for Mombi, but if she doesn't find her, she must leave. Mombi disguises herself as a flower that the Tin Woodman picks while he is searching. Without knowing the group has found Mombi. Glinda leaves disappointed, but in the camp she notices the flower and drives Mombi out. Mombi is captured by Glinda and the group and is questioned about the true heir to the throne. Mombi confesses that Tip is actually the heir. Ozma was given to Mombi who turned her into a boy to disguise her. Tip is given a potion and changed back into Ozma who takes the throne from Jinjur.

== Collected editions ==
The series (issues 1–8) is available in a hardcover book. The Marvelous Land of Oz (200 pages hardcover September 29, 2010) ISBN 978-0-7851-4028-3
