= The Enchanted Apples of Oz =

Book by Eric Shanower

- Cover to The Enchanted Apples of Oz (First Graphic Novel #5), art by Eric Shanower.
- Date: 1986
- Series: First Graphic Novel #5
- Publisher: First Comics

Creative team
- Writers: Eric Shanower
- ISBN: 0915419041

The Enchanted Apples of Oz is the first of the modern graphic novels based on American author L. Frank Baum's Land of Oz world, written by Eric Shanower. The book tells the story of Valynn, who protects a garden containing an enchanted apple tree, the fruit of which contains the essence of Oz magic.

In this, the earliest of Shanower's many Oz publications, the artist introduced the lushly romantic style of Oz illustration that would distinguish his work in the genre over the next two decades and win substantial critical praise.

== Publication history ==
The book was released in 1986 as the fifth in First Comics' graphic novel series First Graphic Novel. After First closed in 1991 a number of publishers took over their titles and The Enchanted Apples of Oz has been reprinted twice by Dark Horse Comics in 1993 (ISBN 0915419041) and 1998 (ISBN 1878574663).

== Plot summary ==
=== Chapter 1: The Apple Tree ===
While taking a stroll, Dorothy Gale, the Scarecrow and Billina see a castle materializing in front of them. Exploring the castle, they find a woman named Valynn, the guardian of an enchanted apple tree. The tree has been growing since the creation of Oz, and Valynn reveals that if the apples are picked or if the tree died, all magic in Oz would disappear. Most of the apples are golden and have the power to break any enchantment; one apple is silver and holds the power of Valynn's existence.

Valynn says that the existence of the apples were once well known, but she had to cast a spell transporting the castle, herself and the tree into limbo after a magician named Bortag tried to steal some of the apples. After one hundred years, she couldn't stand being alone in limbo, so she cancelled the spell, believing that Bortag had given up. Dorothy tells Valynn that Princess Ozma may be able to help her. Valynn is worried about leaving the tree, but Scarecrow and Billina agree to stand guard. Dorothy uses her magic belt to transport her to the Emerald City.

=== Chapter 2: The Witch Awakes ===
However, Bortag hasn't forgotten about the apples, and alerted to their return by his magic, he rides in on Drox, a flying swordfish, to steal the apples. Scarecrow and Billina try to stop him, but Scarecrow is knocked away and Billina is stuffed into his sack with the apples.

Meanwhile, at the castle, Valynn tells her story to Ozma, and Ozma looks through the magic picture to learn more about the enchanted apples. They discover that some of the apples have been stolen and find Bortag in a hut at the edge of the Deadly Desert, feeding an apple to a sleeping old woman, the Wicked Witch of the South, awakening her. Bortag tries to tell the Witch that he loves her, but she steals the apples and performs a spell to transport herself to the tree. The magic picture loses the image, and Valynn realizes that Oz is beginning to lose its magic. Ozma teleports herself, Dorothy and Valynn to the castle to stop the Witch.

=== Chapter 3: Bortag's Unfortunate Past ===
After being spurned, Bortag wants to walk into the desert to die, but Billina convinces him to go to the castle by riding on Drox. During their flight, Bortag tells Billina he is from the town of Glun, where everyone is extremely ugly. When he was younger, he wasn't ugly enough, making everyone else shun him. Bortag became a recluse and began studying magic, but couldn't do much more than create potatoes.

Depressed, he wandered until he reached the desert. In a hut at its edge, he found the Wicked Witch of the South, kept in an enchanted sleep. Falling in love with her, he believed that if he woke her, she might reciprocate his feelings. He went after the apples to break the enchantment, but was foiled by Valynn. Later, while Bortag was waiting for the castle to return, a flying swordfish fell in front of the hut. The swordfish introduced himself as Drox; he came from the ocean and flew over the desert, but couldn't get back to the ocean. As Billina tries to respond to the tale, she suddenly loses the ability to speak, showing Bortag that Oz is losing its enchantment.

Meanwhile, Valynn, Ozma and Dorothy arrive at the castle, where Scarecrow tells them that some of the apples were stolen and that the Witch is eating all the remaining ones. Valynn, Ozma and Dorothy run in to face the Wicked Witch, but Scarecrow, who is under the Witch's control, steals the magic belt from Dorothy and hands it to the Witch. As the Witch reaches for the silver apple, Valynn charges at her, and the Witch turns her into a silver statue.

=== Chapter 4: The Magic Belt ===
Ozma and Dorothy try to come up with a plan against the witch, but all the magic in Oz is gone except for the belt, which comes from outside of Oz. When Ozma tries to cast a spell, the Witch first turns Ozma to stone, then transforms Dorothy into a wooden statue. Just then, Bortag arrives and has Drox dive in and snatch the belt with his sword. However, the belt catches the Witch's shoes, hoisting her in the air, and she uses her chance to turn Drox into a cloud. After falling to the ground, in which course Scarecrow is accidentally ripped to pieces, Bortag claims the belt and turns the Wicked Witch to stone. Then he restores Drox and leaves, but not before also turning Ozma, Dorothy, Valynn and Scarecrow back to their former selves.

The next day, back in the Emerald City, Ozma discovers that with too many of the apples lost, the magic of Oz is still draining away and without the belt there's nothing they can do. At that moment, Bortag comes back to return the belt, saying he thought it could give him everything he wanted, but soon realized that the only thing he wanted was for someone to like him, which he found in Drox, and asking Ozma to transport them to the ocean. Granting her forgiveness, Ozma first teleports them to the tree, restoring the apples and thus the magic in Oz. She then creates an invisible barrier around the tree which only Valynn can pass through, ending any need for Valynn to return to Limbo. Finally, she teleports Bortag and Drox to the ocean, ending the story by saying that "when one's heart is content, true happiness is never far away".

Preceded by None	Oz Graphic Novels; The Enchanted Apples of Oz	Succeeded by The Secret Island of Oz
