= Cathrine Countiss =

American actress(1873–1955)

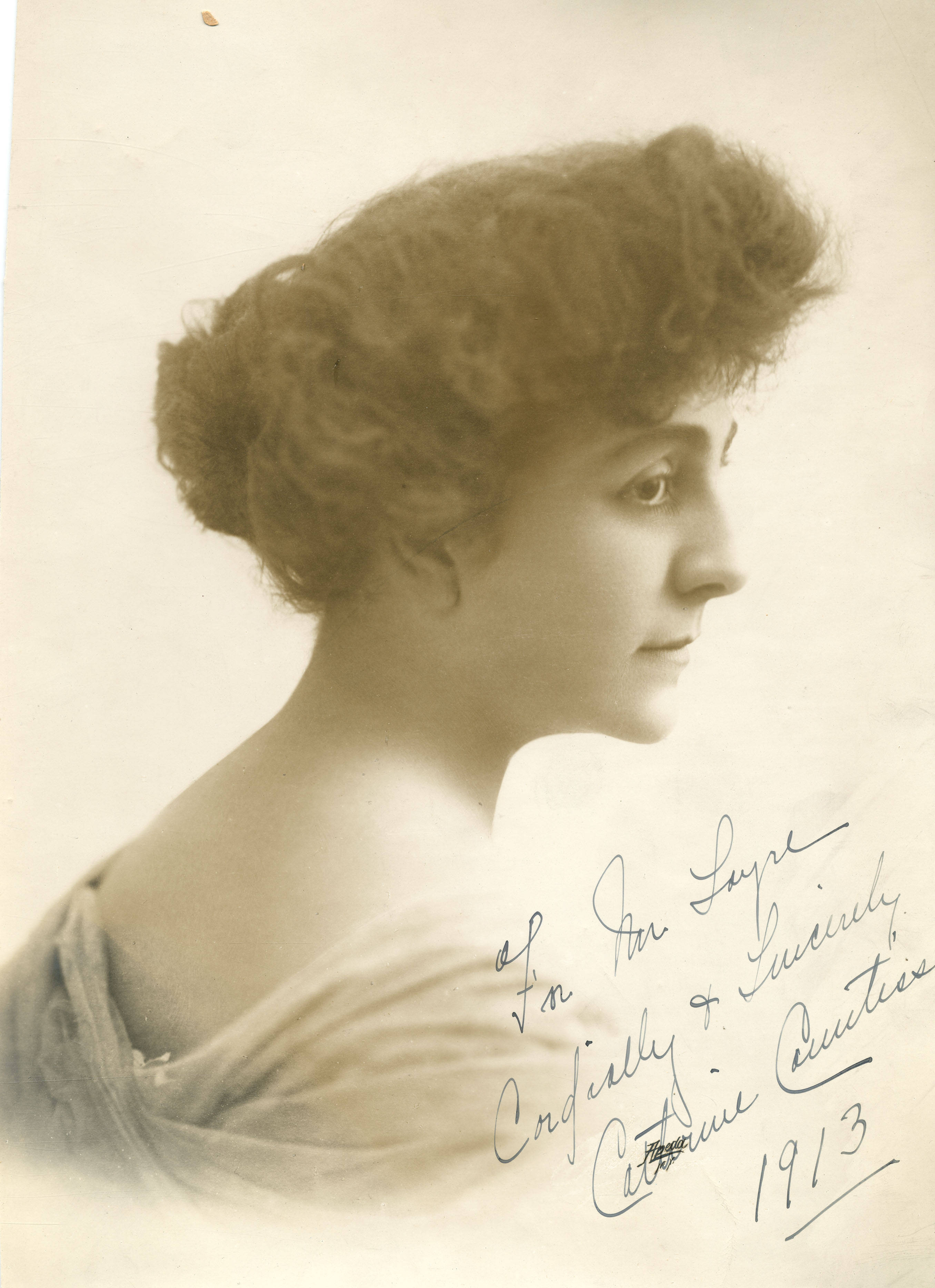
- Born: Birdie Sherman Crooks; 16 July 1873; Sherman, Texas, U.S.
- Died: 27 October 1955 (aged 82); Pasadena, California, U.S.
- Burial place: Mountain View Mausoleum, Altadena, California, U.S.
- Occupation: Actress
- Years active: 1901–1915
- Spouses: William Peter Countiss (m. 1892) Edward D. Price (m. 1907–1915) George Clark Hanna (m. 1915–1955)

Birdie Sherman Crooks (16 July 1873 – 27 October 1955), known professionally as Cathrine Countiss — often misspelled in media as Catherine Countiss — was an American actress at the beginning of the 20th century. She appeared in multiple Broadway productions, traveling stock companies, vaudeville tours, and silent films, traveling across the United States and portions of Canada during her career that spanned the years 1901 through 1915. She was married three times including to Edward D. (E. D.) Price, who was also her theatrical agent during their time of marriage.

== Early life ==
Born to Judge Thomas Jefferson (T. J.) Crooks and his wife Winnie Jane Edmundson on 16 July 1873, Countiss spent her early childhood in Sherman, Texas, just after her parents' move from Paris, Texas that same year. Her father was a well-respected Texas legislator representing the Red River area, judge, newspaper publisher, and local politician.

At the age of 9, Countiss moved with her family to Denison, Texas where she would continue her childhood up until her first marriage. As a daughter of a Texas pioneer, she would become an independent, fearless woman, always pushing up against the usual domestic expectations of the era and showing at an early age the talents that would carry her through a successful acting career. She was even noted later in life as being an "exceedingly clever pool player and billiardist."

Beginning in 1889, Countiss attended the Hagerstown Female Seminary (later known as Kee Mar College) in Maryland for two years — sometimes referred to as a convent. Following her return to Denison, she wed William Peter Countiss on 7 December 1892 at the Methodist Episcopal South Church in an event that was meticulously recounted in the local newspaper. After their honeymoon, the couple planned to establish their home in Denison. But, she apparently had other ideas in mind — along with her new husband's employer.

== Adult life and career ==
Less than a year later, her husband, who was an auditor for the Waters Pierce Oil Company, was transferred with his job to St. Louis, Missouri. Then by 1901, the couple was living in Omaha, Nebraska and periodically returned to Denison to visit her parents. Countiss graduated from a dramatic school in New York about this same time and the lure of the stage finally takes root.

=== Stage ===
Around this time period, Countiss dropped her given name and adopts Cathrine and combined it with her married surname to be her professional stage name. Her first appearances were with the Murray Hill Stock Company in New York City, first with small parts and then moving to leading roles. In 1903, she completed a 30-week engagement with the Baker Stock Company in Portland, Oregon, a city she would return to often in her career. The next season she would play with the Columbia Stock Company, again in Portland, after a 40-week Pacific coast tour playing the lead role of Glory Quayle in The Christian.

From 1906 to 1910, Countiss appeared in four productions that made their way to Broadway theatres. All were short-lived, only running several weeks. The production of Mrs. Warren's Profession also received a pre-Broadway run at the Montauk Theatre in Brooklyn, New York, as did The Watcher, which played at the Auditorium Theatre in Baltimore, Maryland, and Barbara's Millions in Chicago, Illinois.

The old Metropolitan Opera House at Broadway and 39th Street in New York City played host to the Actors' Fund Fair for six days beginning on 6 May 1907. The charity bazaar replicated on stage Shakespeare's Stratford-on-Avon's village streets, complete with his home, Ann Hathaway's cottage, Guildhall, and the church. Throughout the run of the event, all manner of attractions would take place including recitals, demonstrations, singing, band concerts, moving pictures, art galleries, and prominent actresses of the day running booths offering merchandise for sale and giving away prizes. Among them was Countiss who would be there with "her beautiful bookmakers at the racing wheel."

Price was the Promotion Manager for the event and enlisted novelists, dramatists, and other writers to help him publish the daily newspaper devoted to covering the details — Mark Twain among them. Kicked off at the push of a button in Washington by President Theodore Roosevelt, the fund-raiser would raise a total of $63,941.60 to support the charity.

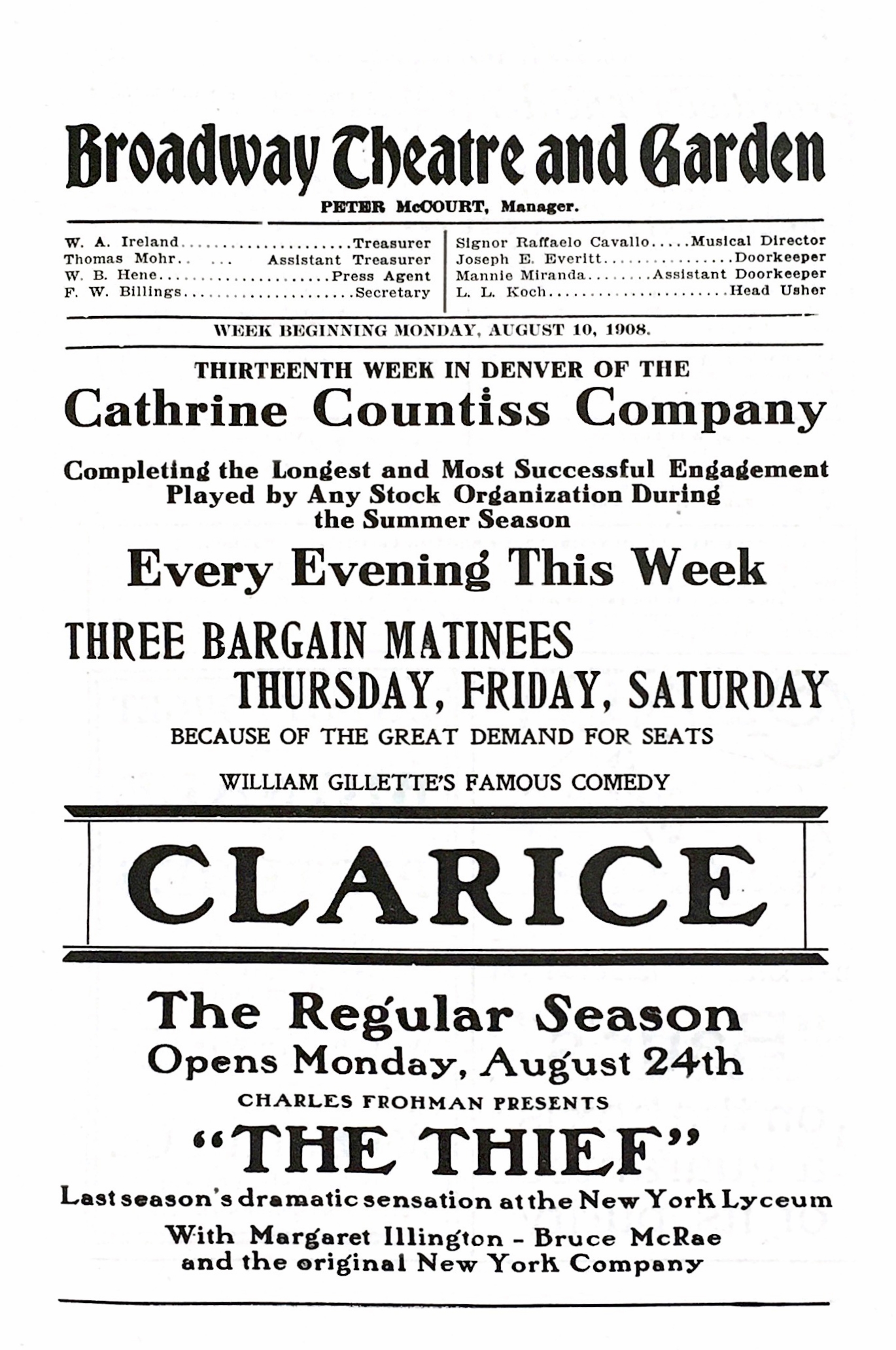
Cathrine Countiss Stock Company, Broadway Theatre program, Denver, 1908

Price courted Cathrine at her racing wheel. By the end of the event they were engaged and a month later motored off to Mt. Vernon, New York where they were quickly married at the First Methodist Church on 30 June 1907.

Beginning the week of 18 May 1908, the Cathrine Countiss Stock Company, under the management of Price, began the Denver summer theatre season with Road to Yesterday at the Tabor Grand Opera House. The full season would be a 13-week engagement of 13 different plays starring Countiss in the lead roles, presented first at the Tabor and then moving in July to the Broadway Theatre and Garden, where symphony concerts and refreshments were served between the acts. The following weeks would see productions of Graustark, In the Bishop's Carriage, At Yale, Prince Karl, Mrs. Dane's Defense, Barbara Freitchie, Charley's Aunt, The Three of Us, and Strongheart among others. The final production would be Clarice, ending the week of 10 August.

The productions were high-quality, large scale, and well received by the Denver audiences, causing in some cases the musicians to be placed under the stage to make more room for the audience. Highlights included actual motor cars driven on stage, a re-enactment of the Yale-Harvard boat race which required a cast of over 50, and a cast of over 100 in the war play Barbara Freitchie that played during the Independence Day holiday weekend. Price would insure that publicity for the season would keep audiences coming to the theatre, employing such tactics as putting the car driven by Countiss onstage in a local department store window and having her personally award a pair of silver spurs to the winner of the Great Horse Race of 1908.

Throughout the next several seasons, Countiss headed several stock companies in Denver and Grand Rapids in multiple roles. She also created the role of Mrs. Howard Jeffries in The Third Degree on tour. In 1911 she toured as Sister Giovanni in The White Sister and returned in 1912 for another summer season in Portland to play lead roles at the Heilig Theatre to the enthusiasm of her fans.

=== Vaudeville ===
After a number of successful years on the legitimate stage, Countiss made her formal debut in vaudeville on 30 March 1913 at B. F. Keith's Union Square Theatre in New York City in the one-act dramatic playlet The Birthday Present, playing the role of Gwendolyn. Written especially for her by Fannie Whitehouse, the playlet would continue a short out-of-town tryout tour that spring commencing in St. Louis on 21 April, after performing in Baltimore at the Maryland Theatre.

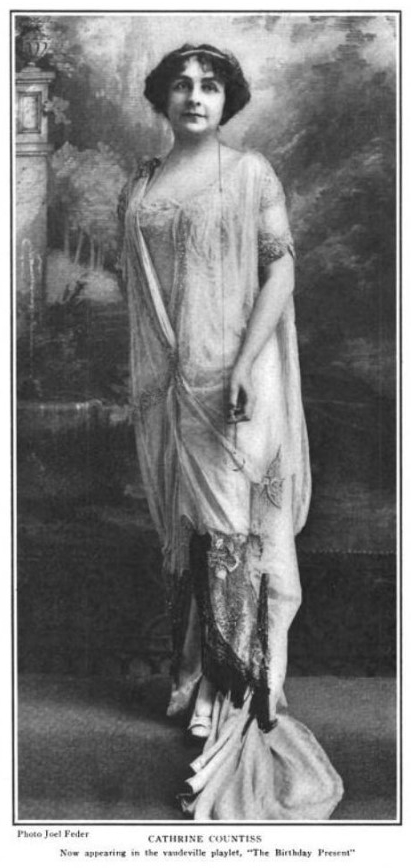
"The Birthday Present" 1913

At the end of the tour, Countiss headed to her summer home in Denver to rest and visit family and friends, as was her habit. Her reviews of The Birthday Present proved so successful that Martin Beck engaged her to do a full 40-week tour on the Orpheum circuit with a premiere at the Brighton Beach Music Hall beginning in August. Tour stops included Memphis and other cities through the South and Midwest; Winnipeg, Edmonton, and Calgary in Canada; theatres along the Pacific Coast including Los Angeles and San Francisco; then returning through Denver, Salt Lake City, and the Palace Theatre in Chicago. The tour would end in March the following year at the newly built Palace Theatre in New York City, which was considered the pinnacle of the vaudeville circuit.

During the New York City Palace run, she shared billing with Mademoiselle Dazie in Sir James M Barrie's play Pantaloon; Mae Murray dancing with Clifton Webb; and specially featured, Harry Fox and his wife Yanci Dolly (of the famed Dolly sisters).

The challenge with being married to a successful theatrical manager and having your own stage career is that you are not in the same place together very often. Such was the case with Countiss and Price who frequently found themselves on opposite coasts, or at least different cities. While she was touring on the Orpheum circuit, he was managing Robert Hilliard on the east coast. They did manage to merge their schedules in Chicago in March after not seeing each other for six months. Price, in his wry humor, wired his wife to tell her he would meet her at the train and to "wear violets so I will know you."

At the close of the Orpheum tour, she began yet another tour — this time on the Interstate Amusement Company circuit in her home state of Texas, much to the delight of her local followers. All told, Countiss would perform The Birthday Present in over 500 performances in less than a year. The couple, however, hoped to meet again in July in Denver at their summer home.

=== Silent film ===
Beginning in late 1914, Countiss turned her acting talents and considerable stage experience to mastering the medium of silent feature films. In the span of roughly six months, she would star in four moving pictures. First would be the five-reel film The Idler, an adaptation of the stage play by C. Haddon Chambers, co-starring Charles Richman, and produced by the Box Office Attraction Company (Fox Film). Following this initial entry, Countiss joined the Life Photo Film Corporation under contract to play the lead in their next photoplay, The Avalanche.

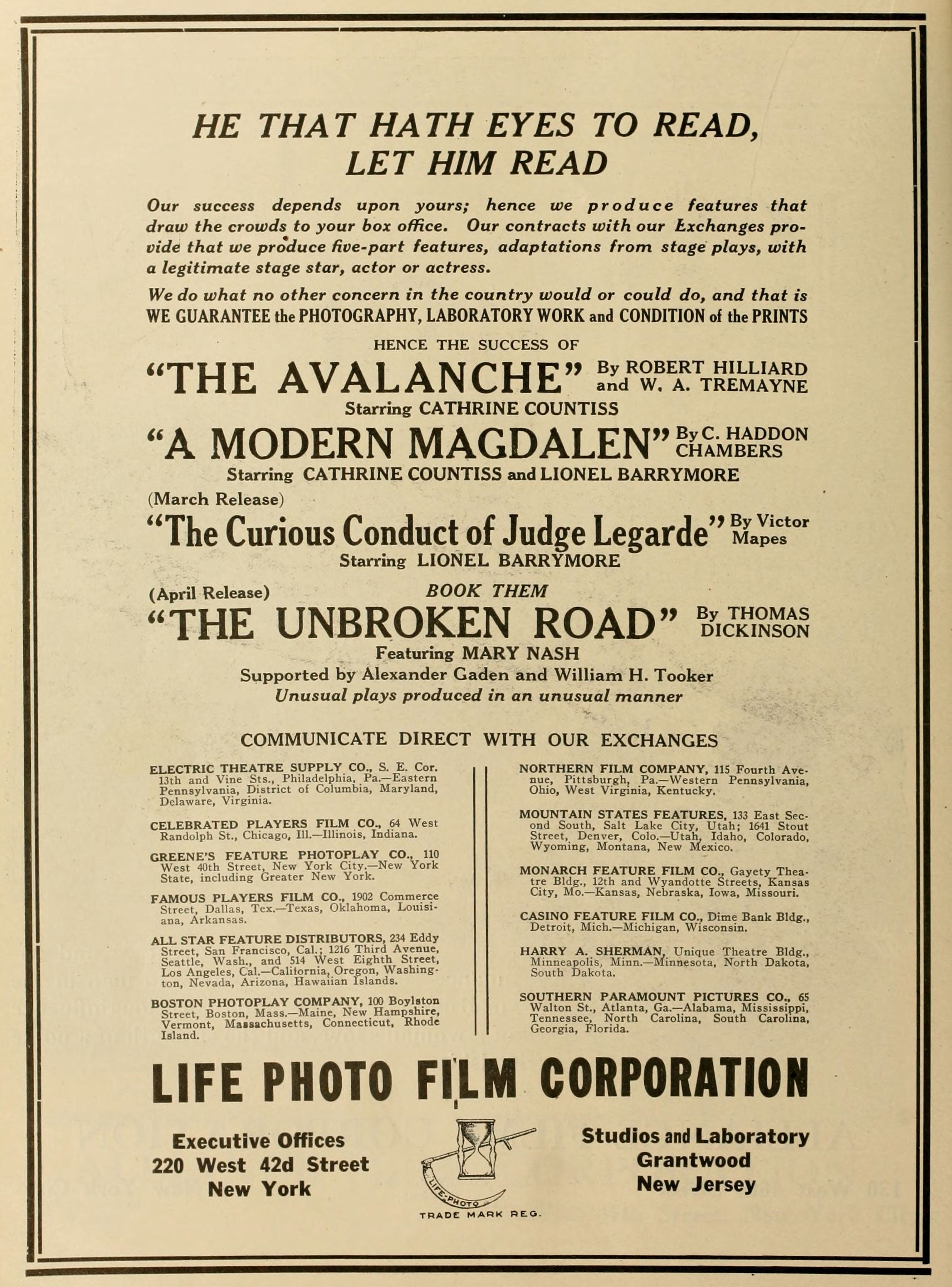
Advertisement for "The Avalanche" and "A Modern Magdalen" starring Cathrine Countiss, 1915

Adapted again from a well-known legitimate stage play, this time by Robert Hilliard and William A. Tremayne, production began 7 December 1914 on the five-part moving picture to be released the following year. During the filming, permission was granted by the New York Stock Exchange for shooting interior shots depicting a panic on the exchange floor, as part of the plot involved attempts to manipulate the lead male character's mining stock. Other filming was done across the Hudson River in their laboratory and studios in Grantwood, New Jersey, near Fort Lee which at the time was the center of the American movie industry. One reviewer commented that "Cathrine Countiss, well known both on the stage and screen, has the feminine lead...and plays the part to perfection." Building on her success, Life Photo renewed her contract to play the lead in their upcoming film, A Modern Magdalen.

C. Haddon Chambers would again provide the source material for this film, based on his play by the same name. Countiss would share top-billing with Lionel Barrymore playing opposite her in this five-act production released in the spring of 1915.

The fourth and final film in her career came when it was announced she had been engaged by the newly formed Dramatic Feature Films, the short-lived successor to The Oz Film Manufacturing Company. She would play the title role in The Gray Nun of Belgium, written by Frank J. Baum — the son of L. Frank Baum of OZ fame — and Francis Powers. Filming would be done in their Los Angeles studios, the city that would soon replace the east coast as the new capital of cinema in the United States. Although planned to be released later that year, indications are that the film's distributor found it inferior and refused to exhibit it. So, no known copies exist. As with many silent films which have been lost, only two of Countiss' films are known to still be extant according to the American Silent Feature Film Survival Database, The Avalanche and A Modern Magdalen.

The location of shooting of this final moving picture would prove pivotal in the life of Countiss, ending her professional career and starting a whole new chapter.

== Later years and death ==
Enter George Clark Hanna to the stage. After filming was complete on her final movie in the late spring of 1915, Countiss did not return to New York to resume her stage career as some would have thought. Instead, she stayed in Los Angeles through the winter and rekindled a relationship with her long-time acquaintance and school sweetheart from the Denison days of her childhood. Hanna had already moved from Ft. Worth, Texas to California in 1911 to take some months of rest and start a new business after he closed his lumber business there. And the result was that Countiss would divorce Price and marry for the third time to Hanna before year-end.

The couple would settle into a comfortable life in Pasadena, California eventually living at the historic Hotel Green far removed from the frenetic pace and coast-to-coast travel of the stage world. Throughout the 1930s and 1940s they would take several cruises to Hawaii and Europe to rest and relax. They would remain married for the next 40 years until her death on 27 October 1955 at their home. She is interred at the grand and elaborate mausoleum in Mountain View Cemetery, Altadena, California, designed by the prominent mausoleum designer Cecil E. Bryan. Hanna would join her in 1958.

== Broadway stage credits ==
- Barbara's Millions (1906) as Fernande, co-starring with Lillian Russell as Barbara at the Savoy Theatre
- Mrs. Warren's Profession (1907) as Vivie Warren at the Manhattan Theatre
- The Offenders (1908) as Mimi Graham at the Hudson Theatre
- The Watcher (1910) as Felice Kent at the Comedy Theatre

== Filmography ==
- The Idler (1914) as Lady Helen Merryweather Harding for Box Office Attraction Company (Fox Film)
- The Avalanche aka Barrier Between (1915) as Clara Benson Vaughan for Life Photo Film Corporation
- A Modern Magdalen (1915) as Katinka Jenkins, co-starring with Lionel Barrymore as Lindsay for Life Photo Film Corporation
- The Gray Nun of Belgium (1915) as the title role for Alliance Films Corporation, Dramatic Feature Films, The Oz Film Manufacturing Company
