= The Dreamer of Oz: The L. Frank Baum Story =

1990 television film directed by Jack Bender

- Promotional release poster by Deborah Ann Hall
- Genre: Biography; Drama; Family
- Written by: Richard Matheson
- Story by: David Kirschner; Richard Matheson
- Directed by: Jack Bender
- Starring: John Ritter; Annette O'Toole; Rue McClanahan
- Music by: Lee Holdridge
- Country of origin: United States
- Original language: English

Production
- Executive producers: David Kirschner; Robert M. Myman
- Producers: Ervin Zavada; Laura Moskowitz
- Cinematography: Thomas Burstyn
- Editor: Jerrold L. Ludwig
- Running time: 100 minutes
- Production companies: Bedrock Productions; Adam Productions; Spelling Entertainment

Original release
- Network: NBC
- Release: December 10, 1990

The Dreamer of Oz: The L. Frank Baum Story is a 1990 American made-for-television biographical film starring John Ritter as Lyman Frank Baum, the author who wrote the 1900 novel The Wonderful Wizard of Oz and thirteen other Oz books. Also starring in it were Annette O'Toole as Baum's supportive wife, Maud, and Rue McClanahan as Baum's tough mother-in-law, Matilda Gage.

The film is told as a flashback from the point of view of L. Frank Baum's widow, Maud Gage Baum. It tells how her husband came to create The Wonderful Wizard of Oz while undergoing and eventually overcoming professional and personal failures.

== Plot ==
It's 1939 and the classic MGM film The Wizard of Oz is about to premiere at Grauman's Chinese Theatre in Hollywood. 78 year old Mrs. Baum has been invited to attend the premiere. Before she enters the theater a young journalist recognizes her and asks if he may interview her. She politely agrees and begins to recount how she first met her husband in 1890. The rest of the flashback follows Baums life in the 1890s, working as an actor, store owner, newspaper publisher and traveling salesmen. Interspersed in this narrative Baum tells his children about his magical land fantasy, slowing conceive elements of the story based on his own life. The Wicked Witch of the West, for instance, is based on his mother in law, whilst Glinda, the good witch, is based on his wife; the scarecrow is based around a window display, and the munchkins on a little person he employs, etc. He is eventually convinced to write these stories down in a book which is published as The Wonderful Wizard of Oz.

== Historical accuracy ==
There is some literary license taken, especially in the completely-fabricated backstory regarding the creation of the character Dorothy. In truth, Dorothy Louise Gage died as a five-month-old infant, in Bloomington, Illinois. To console his wife on the loss of her beloved niece, Baum created an older girl, in the care of her Aunt Em, as the central character in the fantasy universe that became the Oz stories. "M" was the initial of Maud Baum's own first name, and there was no expansion of Em's name in the Oz books (though she was assumed to be "Emily" in the 1939 film). However, in "Dreamer of Oz" she is portrayed as a young child (and played by 5-year-old Courtney Barilla), living in Dakota Territory. As she lay dying, Baum tells her that the central character in his stories was actually a girl named Dorothy.

Baum's editorials about the genocide of the American Indians is never mentioned.

== Cast ==
- John Ritter as L. Frank Baum
- Annette O'Toole as Maud Gage Baum
- Rue McClanahan as Matilda Electa Joslyn Gage
- Charles Haid as Al Badham / Cowardly Lion
- David Schramm as W. W. Denslow
- Nancy Lenehan as Harriet Alvena Baum Neal
- Courtney Barilla as Dorothy Leslie Gage /Dorothy Gale
- Nancy Morgan as Helen Leslie Gage
- Jason Ritter as Harry Neal Baum
- Pat Skipper as Charlie H. Gage
- Ed Gale as Ned Brown / Farmer
- Trevor Eyster as Frank Joslyn Baum (5–9 years) (as Tim Eyster)
- Joshua Boyd as Frank Joslyn Baum (3 years)
- Roger Steffens as Salesman (as Roger Steffans)
- John Cameron Mitchell as Albert the Reporter
- Frank Hamilton as Sullivan
- Steven Gilborn as George M. Hill
- Jerry Maren as Mr. Munchkin
- Elizabeth Barrington as Mrs. Munchkin
- David Ellzey as Scarecrow
- Derek Loughran as Tin Man (as Derek Loughram)
- Christopher Pettiet as Teenage Frank Jr.
- Ryan Todd as Robert Stanton Baum
- Alexis Kirschner as Tweety Robbins
- Paul Linke as Opie Read (uncredited)

== Reception ==
In his TV Preview, Tom Shales of The Washington Post proclaimed the film "cheerfully satisfying", and praised the production values, but wasn't impressed with Ritter's performance. John J. O'Connor of The New York Times praised Ritter's performance and called the film "heartwarming". Howard Rosenberg of the Los Angeles Times dubbed it "long on mush and short on magic", but praised the recreations from the original stories.
