= Maud Gage Baum =

Wife of L. Frank Baum

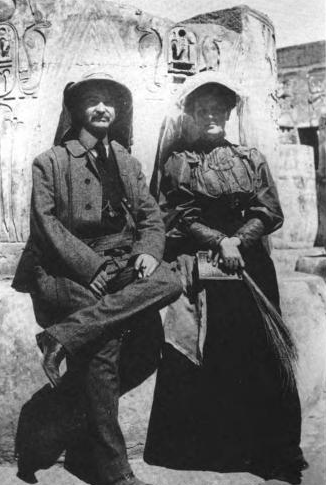
- L. Frank and Maud Gage Baum in Egypt in 1906
- Born: Maud Gage; March 27, 1861; Syracuse, New York, U.S.
- Died: March 6, 1953 (aged 91); Los Angeles, California, U.S.
- Education: Syracuse Classical School; Cornell University
- Spouse: L. Frank Baum (m. 1882; died 1919)
- Children: 4, including Frank and Harry
- Parent(s): Matilda Joslyn Gage; Henry Hill Gage
- Relatives: Roger S. Baum (great-grandson)

Maud Gage Baum (née Gage; March 27, 1861 – March 6, 1953) was the wife of American children's publisher L. Frank Baum. Her mother was the suffragist Matilda Joslyn Gage. In her early life, she attended a boys' high school.

Maud lived in Fayetteville, New York, with her aging parents until she married Frank in 1882, sacrificing her college education at Cornell University. At the onset of their marriage, she accompanied her husband's acting troupe throughout the United States. After she became pregnant, Maud and Frank settled down in a rented house, where she gave birth to Frank Joslyn in 1883. Complications arising from giving birth to her second son Robert Stanton in 1886 caused Maud to become afflicted with peritonitis. Ill for two years, she found solace in visiting her mother and siblings. In 1889 and 1891, she gave birth to Harry Neal and Kenneth Gage, respectively.

Described by her children as a no-nonsense mother, Maud took charge of the family finances and the disciplining of her children. She was their primary caretaker because her husband's business obligations frequently led to his being away for weeks at a time. The family moved to Aberdeen, South Dakota, in 1888 because Maud wished to be near her brother and two sisters. After her husband was unable to sustain a living there, they moved to Chicago. Because of their dire financial situation, Maud also worked, teaching embroidery and lace-making.

Beginning in 1900, her husband's best-selling picture book, Father Goose: His Book (first published in 1899), brought the family financial security that it had theretofore lacked. They began spending their summers at a cottage in Macatawa Park, Michigan. In November of that year, Frank transferred to Maud the literary rights of his most recent books, including Father Goose and From Kansas to Fairyland (later published as The Wonderful Wizard of Oz). By dint of Frank's literary successes, Maud and Frank were financially secure enough to tour Egypt and Europe for six months. Since Frank was frequently occupied with penning stories for his publishers, Maud was the one who wrote numerous letters home. These letters were later published in 1907 as In Other Lands Than Ours for friends and family. After Frank died, she authorized Ruth Plumly Thompson to write more Oz sequels and helped promote MGM's film The Wizard of Oz (1939). In 1953, she died at 91 years of age, surviving her husband by 34 years.

== Early life ==
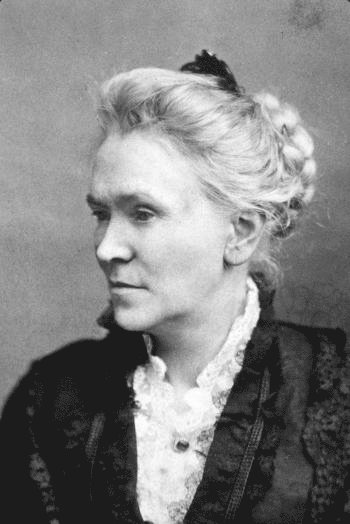
Maud's mother, Matilda Joslyn Gage

Born on March 27, 1861 to Matilda Joslyn Gage and Henry Hill Gage Maud was the youngest of their four children. She had two sisters, Helen Leslie Gage and Julia Gage Carpenter, and a brother, Thomas Clarkson Gage. Her mother was a feminist who fought for women's rights, and her father was a prosperous dry-goods retailer. A relative noted that Maud's mother was a "woman of force" who "ruled her mild, gentle husband and her four children with a rod of iron". Maud lived with her parents in a Greek Revival home in Fayetteville, New York. Baum scholar Evan I. Schwartz wrote that Maud had "dark hair, a shapely figure, and eyes as sharp as her mind". In her youth, Maud went to a boys' high school. Both she and her future husband, L. Frank Baum, attended Syracuse Classical School, a preparatory school in Syracuse, New York.

In September 1880, Maud headed to Cornell University, leaving on a train and arriving at an Ithaca depot two hours later. Her brother, Clarkson, had graduated as one of the top of the class, though her elder sisters did not attend a university. When Maud arrived at the university, she intended to be the family's first woman to receive a complete degree. Her mother dreamed of her becoming a doctor or a lawyer, which would be a rare accomplishment for a woman.

Though Maud had very little knowledge about being on her own, she was not timid. When she entered the parlor of her dormitory on her first day there, she recognized a tune from the piano. Telling the girls around her that "I dearly love dancing", Maud pretended to dance. A sophomore girl, Jessie Mary Boulton, who observed her wrote in a letter back home: "There is one that I think will make quite a stir. Her name is Gage and she is lively." Baum scholar Evan I. Schwartz remarked that "[l]ively may have seemed like a compliment of sorts but it was a code word for trouble". A girl characterized as "lively" would have a difficult time in college and was likely to produce gossip.

Maud's tuition cost $25 each term, roughly equivalent to the money her father made each week at his Fayetteville store. (Note: Because Cornell had three terms, the annual tuition amounted to $75. The cost of books each year was $25. The living costs of "room, board, lighting and fuel" were very expensive.) The cost of living at Sage College, a dormitory populated exclusively by females, (Note: In the East Coast of the United States, Cornell University was the initial preeminent university to allow women to be taught alongside men. When Maud began attending the college, it had been the sixth year women lived on campus.) was $7.50 every week, which amounted to $340 every year. If two students roomed together, each could save $40. To save money, Maud chose to room with a sophomore girl, Josie Baum. When they were still strangers to each other, they addressed each other formally, saying "Miss Gage" or "Miss Baum". (Note: To enter the school, Maud and the other freshman had to take entrance examinations. For the first question, she was asked to provide a short biography and why she wanted to enroll at Cornell. On her geography exam, Maud had to draw the boundary lines of Kansas, Minnesota, and Utah Territory on a map that lacked state borders. On her grammar exam, a question asked her to "State the difference between coordinating and subordinating conjunctives", while the math exam was considered so "brainsplitting" by Evan I. Schwartz that "Maud and the rest of the students must have been exhausted after the two days were complete".) After Maud passed the exam, she was included in the September 16, 1880, inaugural issue of the school daily, Cornell Sun, as "Miss M. Gage, Fayetteville". In her freshman class of 131 students, there were only 19 women.

The few young women compared to the number of young men led to the women being paid unwanted attention. Maud's classmate, Jessie Mary, wrote that the "[b]oys (or young men as I guess they call themselves) abound". She noted that girls were frequently ogled by the boys, who enjoyed teasing them. When a girl was late, the boys would loudly clap as she sat down. Each October, the freshman class would elect about twelve positions, including a president and vice president, a treasurer, a class essayist, and a marshal. The marshal was tasked with organizing parties and other social occurrences. Girls were generally barred from most of the positions. However, an annual tradition of the boys was to "nominate the most precocious girl" and then "gossip about her viciously". Maud was nominated.

Nasty rumors about Maud circulated around campus, causing her to angrily lock herself in her dorm, where she cried for several hours. Her roommate, Jessie, wrote in a letter home that:

We have had a sensation here. I told you about a lively girl in the freshman class. Monday, at the class of '84 election, her name was put on one of the tickets for marshal ... She is a very sensitive girl and has been taking it very hard. She has tried to keep straight and her failure is what troubles her ... She is quite young and has never been on her own responsibility before, which makes it doubly hard for her. Her mother is Mrs. Joslyn Gage.

Because the boys knew her mother was the women's rights activist Matilda Joslyn Gage, Maud was subjected to more bullying than the other girls. Divided on the issue of women's rights, some Cornell boys believed it to be a farce, ripe for mockery. Others thought it to be a plague, a danger that had to be ended. In the September 29, 1880, issue of the Cornell Sun's humor column a boy included the limerick:

There is a gay maiden at Sage,
Who flies into a terrible rage
If one says in a crowd,
In a tone a bit loud,
"Matilda, may I ask your age?"

The poem was an undisguised attack on Maud for being her mother's substitute. Unaccustomed to the boys' nasty behavior, Maud was severely wounded.

Not all the men condoned such behavior. The all-male editorial board of the Cornell Sun wrote that the boys were being cruel in entering a fake ticket to mock girls. They wrote that "[t]here is not the slightest reason ... to hold the ladies up to ridicule. They have neither sought nor do they aspire to class politics, but have left politics to the more experienced sex." The abuse she suffered at Cornell emotionally scarred her, possibly coloring her view of Cornell men and revealing to her the taxing nature of a woman's forging her way through a world dominated by men.

== Life with L. Frank Baum ==
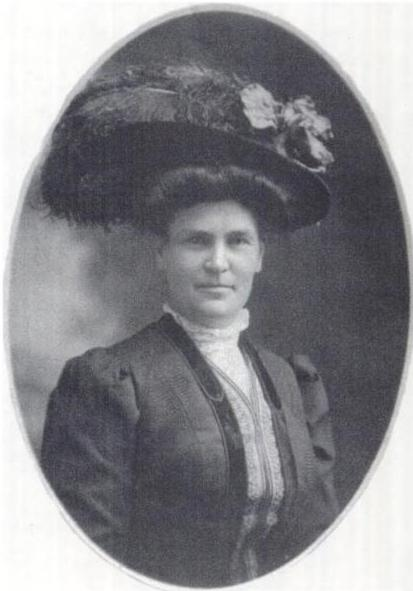
Photograph of Maud Gage Baum circa 1906

While she was studying English and American literature at Cornell University, Maud first met her future husband L. Frank Baum at 678 W. Onondaga St., the house of his sister Harriet Baum Neal, and her husband, William Neal. Her roommate, Josie Baum, was Frank's cousin and urged her to meet Frank. During an 1881 Christmas party, Josie's mother, Josephine, walked hand in hand with Maud to Frank and introduced them to each other, saying, "This is my nephew, Frank. Frank, I want you to know Maud Gage. I'm sure you will love her." (Note: Josephine found Maud to be "quite unusual", which would perfectly complement Frank who was also unusual. That Maud had very progressive parents indicated that they might not be against Maud's marrying Frank, who was now an "oil patch actor" after working as a chicken farmer.) Frank replied, "Consider yourself loved Miss Gage", whereupon Maud countered, "Thank you, Mr. Baum. That's a promise. Please see that you live up to it." Not a week elapsed before Frank was certain he was drawn to her; however, she had other beaus. The two were merely friends when she continued her second year in college and Frank went back to working in the theater. On May 15, 1882, Maud traveled to Syracuse to watch Frank perform in The Maid of Arran. In the summer of that year, Frank paid frequent visits to Maud by using his father's horse and buggy to travel eight miles from his theater company in Syracuse to Maud's house in Fayetteville. Not only in awe of Maud's beauty, Frank was also captivated by her poise and sagacity. For Maud, as she wrote in a letter to a friend, Frank was "very handsome and attractive".

=== Marriage proposal and wedding ===
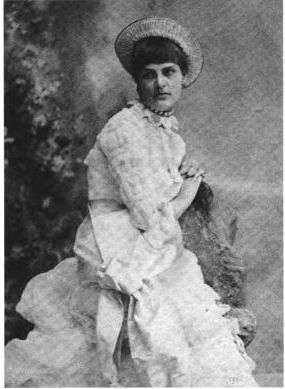
Maud's wedding picture in November 1882

A sophomore at Cornell University, Maud made a significant sacrifice when she accepted Frank's marriage proposal. She was twenty, and he was twenty-five. Maud's mother, suffragist Matilda Joslyn Gage, initially disapproved of Maud's marrying Frank. Matilda considered Frank an "impractical dreamer" who would be unable support a family. (Note: Frank told her in a visit that his future lay in being a playwright. Matilda, who wrote and published copiously, was keenly aware that supporting a family through writing would likely be unsuccessful. The money she made from her publications was trifling.) Matilda, who once dreamed of being a doctor and was not accepted by any medical schools, was distressed that her daughter would sacrifice the chance of higher education to marry a traveling actor. After Maud accepted Frank's proposal, she asked him to remain in her front parlor while she broke the news to her mother in the back parlor. In a conversation that Frank "could not help hearing", he listened to Matilda's harsh disapproval.

Matilda told Maud she refused to "have my daughter be a darned fool and marry an actor". Maud retorted, "All right, mother, if you feel that way about it, good bye." After her mother requested clarification, she said, "I'm going to marry Frank, so, naturally you don't want a darned fool around the house." Upon recognizing that Maud would marry Frank whether or not she supported her, Matilda laughed and acquiesced. On November 9, 1882, Maud and Frank were married by W. H. Hawley, the minister of Fayetteville Baptist Church. The wedding ceremony was held in the parlor of Matilda's home, which was packed with people. Many relatives and friends of Matilda attended the wedding, including Maud's three sisters and women's rights activist Elizabeth Cady Stanton and her husband Henry Stanton. Frank's parents, Benjamin and Cynthia, and his sisters, Hattie and Mattie, also attended the wedding. The parlor was so crowded that the hired string quartet had to play upstairs. The local paper praised the marriage ceremony as "one of equality". Whereas most marriages of the era had the bride's wedding vows include a pledge to obey her husband, the local paper said "the promises required of the bride [were] precisely the same as those required of the groom". The couple honeymooned in Saratoga Springs, New York, whereupon they passed Thanksgiving with their relatives.

=== Marriage ===
Maud's marriage with Frank abounded with passion. The two did not abide by the customary gender roles of a husband and a wife. Whereas at the advent of their marriage Maud was very assertive of her authority, Frank was charming and yielding. In a frequently related family tale, Frank bought a dozen bismarks (jelly doughnuts) and took them home. Affronted, Maud enjoined him to tell her whether he disliked the food she purchased and cooked. Frank told her that her meals were satisfying, but he grinned that he also enjoyed to eat Bismarks for breakfast. For three consecutive mornings, she gave him bismarks to eat. Frank, sick of the now stale doughnuts, placed them in the cupboard after bundling them up in newspaper. (Note: In a time before preservatives, mold began to appear on the doughnuts.) Taking the doughnuts back from the cupboard, Maud forced him to eat them.

After he commented that the doughnuts were growing stale, Maud indifferently responded that because he had purchased them, he was obligated to finish them. Frank, unwilling to eat the moldy doughnuts, buried the rest in the backyard. However, Maud, peering through the window, noticed his actions and immediately scooped them out. "Dust[ing] off" them, she gave one to Frank. Annoyed, Frank told her he no longer wanted to eat the doughnuts because they were "not fit to eat and you know it". Maud rejoined that because he did not confer with her prior to buying the doughnuts, he had to eat them. However, she told him, "I'll let you off this time if you promise never again to buy any food unless I ask you to get it." Frank consented, and the incident "taught him a lesson he never forgot: that ... around the house she was the boss".

Maud was better at managing the family finances than her husband. Whereas her husband's frequent investments were unprofitable, she was "shrewd and impervious". Her son Harry called her "serious, unimaginative, and realistic". Before she married Frank, Maud had a well-off life. Though she assented to living a normal life, Maud was a tad dissatisfied about not completing her studies. As a result, she unleashed her resentment on Frank. Evan I. Schwartz wrote that "[t]he home was the one realm that she could control, and she exercised that control with absolute authority." Maud bossed Frank around, and Frank always complied with her orders. Their relationship paralleled that of Maud's parents. Whereas Maud and her mother ordered their husbands around, Frank and her father gave in to them.

==== Early years (1882–1888) ====
Maud and Frank initially lived in New York, where Frank was employed in the theater business. Together, they traveled by train to Nebraska, thousands of miles away, for Frank's acting tour. Maud crafted a more elaborate costume for Frank, thereby meshing in as an artist with others in the acting troupe. When she became pregnant, Maud wanted them to be settled in a home before the child's birth. After hiring a new star for his play The Maid of Arran, Frank rented a house on Shonnard Street in Syracuse. Their first son, Frank, was born on December 4, 1883.

Beginning when she was a child, Maud had been amazed by the kempt houses around her neighborhood. She was eager to begin "keeping the household, managing its finances, organizing the kitchen, and practicing her favorite hobby, embroidery". For Maud, motherhood would be enough of an achievement. To fulfill her mother's dreams of her becoming a female lawyer or doctor entailed tearing down gender barriers, since there were few, if any, women in those professions. On May 1, 1884, Maud, Frank and their five-month-old son, Frank, moved to 28 Slocum Avenue, which, like their previous residence, was in west Syracuse. During the summer evenings, the family would sip lemonade on the front porch and admire as the "blazing sunsets of the day gave way to the blue Krakatoa moon".

In the summer of 1887, Maud, Frank, and their children lived in the house of Maud's mother, Matilda, whom they frequently visited. (Note: Frank took extensive photographs of the Gage home. His photos were used to guide the restoration of the home which became the Gage Home Museum in 2009. The Gage Home Museum is the only house in which Baum lived that is open to the public. The front parlor in which he and Maud were married became the room in which The Mother of Oz, which details Matilda's effect on Oz, is retold.) On September 16, 1888, at 65 years old, Maud's father, Henry Gage, died after years of typhus affliction. Maud, Frank, and their son attended the funeral, which was executed by Pastor Hawley. Hawley had performed Maud and Frank's marriage two years before her father's death.

Their second son, Robert Stanton, was born on February 1, 1886. Robert was born in their new residence, located on Holland Street, into which they had moved a year prior. Robert's birth was complicated, causing Maud an abdominal infection. The resulting complications led to her becoming afflicted with peritonitis. Confined to bed for months while connected to a drainage tube, she nearly died. Baum scholar Katharine M. Rogers wrote that "[i]n the days before antibiotics, it was remarkable that she pulled through at all". At the time, Frank was selling Castorine (Note: Frank and his uncle, Adam Baum, founded Baum's Castorine Company, which sold Castorine, an axle grease Frank's older brother Benjamin had invented. Castorine was an oil used on road wagons and coaches.) and was frequently away from home for several consecutive weeks. When he was at home, he spent all his time with Maud. To be closer to Frank's sisters, they later moved to a rental house. Maud was ill for two years. A special nurse was hired to take care of her. During her illness, she consoled herself by making regular trips to Fayetteville to see her family.

==== Aberdeen, South Dakota (1888–1900) ====
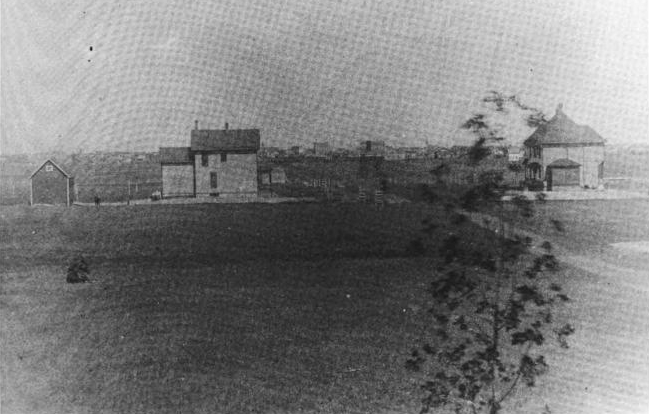
Aberdeen, South Dakota, in an 1888 photograph by L. Frank Baum

Maud's two sisters and brother were in the Dakota Territory. (Note: Clarkson Gage was considered a founding father of Aberdeen. Clarkson partnered with two Fayetteville men to run a profitable general store. A community leader, he played a role in arranging an artesian well, an irrigation plant, and the Aberdeen Building & Loan Association. Frank consulted Clarkson in 1888 to determine whether Frank's opening a bazaar in Aberdeen would be successful. In 1887, Maud's sister, Helen Leslie Gage, and her husband Charles Gage relocated to Aberdeen. Charles bought stock for several estates, while Helen was heavily involved in the community. Becoming the vice president of the Women's Benevolent Society of Aberdeen, she was also a member of the Aberdeen Equal Suffrage Association. In June 1890, she represented the latter organization at the Democratic State Convention. Maud's second sister, Julia Gage Carpenter, and her husband James "Frank" D., experienced numerous failures in Dakota. The Carpenters in 1882 purchased a homestead close to Edgeley, around 70 miles north of Aberdeen. Depressed and lonely at her plight in Dakota, Julia wrote, "This is an awful country, and I want to live East." She maintained that though her husband was considerate and loving, her sole method of survival was the lengthy, habitual visits to her relatives, who resided in Fayetteville and Aberdeen. Despite the Carpenters' not being poor, they resided in a "twelve-foot square shanty, where they were confined for most of the winter". Their closest neighbor was 20 miles away, and "[o]utside was nothing but the vast expanse of prairie, without a hill, tree, or stone to diversify the view".) Maud, Frank, and her two sons moved to Aberdeen, South Dakota, on September 20, 1888, because Frank believed there would be better business opportunities in the West. In 1882, when Maud had traveled with Frank while he had been performing in The Maid of Arran, she had not felt at ease in the western cities they visited. But scholar Katharine M. Rogers noted that Maud would have liked being close to her siblings and being afforded a chance at economic security. Frank started a dry goods store, Baum's Bazaar, on October 1, 1888, to make a stable living for his family. However, because he granted too much credit to his destitute customers, his store went out of business.

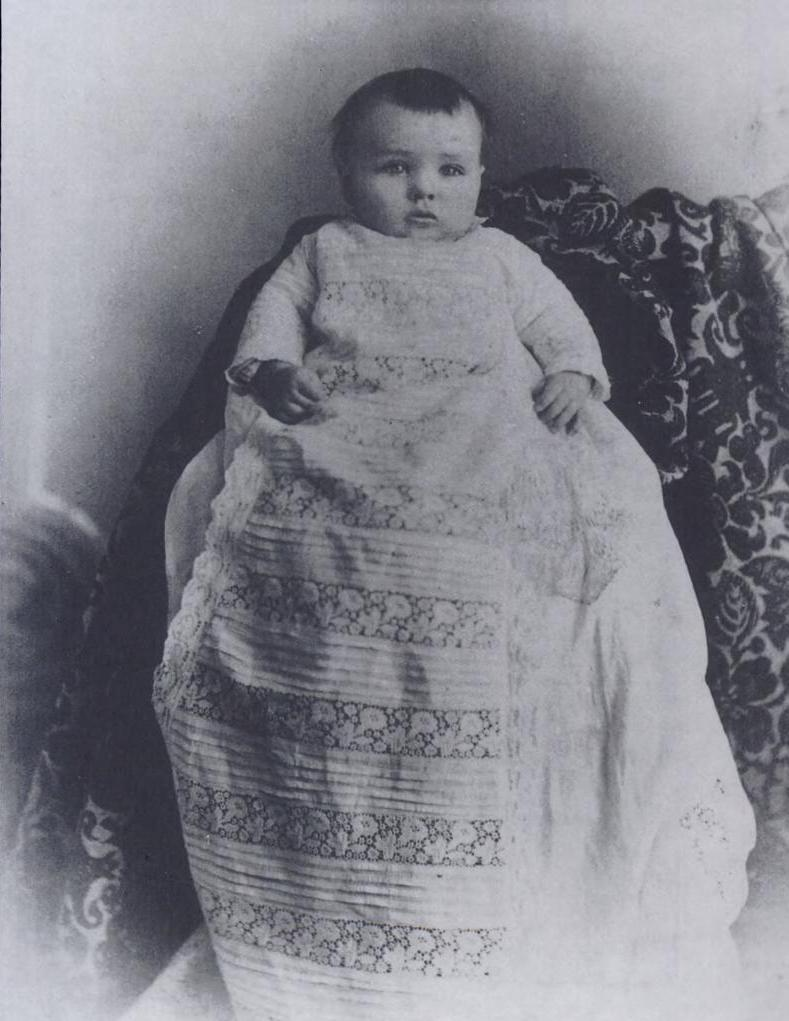
Maud's four-month-old son, Harry Neal Baum, in May 1890

Maud's third son, Harry Neal Baum was born on December 18, 1889. His birth, which was a month before his father's store was foreclosed by the bank, increased the financial burden on the family. Maud's fourth son and final child, Kenneth Gage, was born on May 24, 1891.

The family moved to Chicago, where Frank found a job as a newspaper reporter. By then, Maud and Frank had four sons, Robert, Harry, Kenneth, and Frank. Their Chicago home had neither running water nor a restroom. Because the family's finances were dire, Maud also had to be a breadwinner. Teaching embroidery and lace-making, Maud was so successful that by February 1897, she had over 20 students. The money from her students' tuition allowed her to purchase a new rug and furniture for the house.

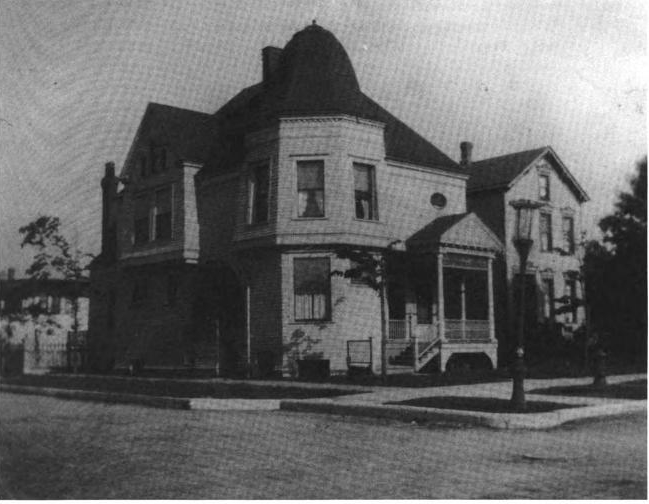
The Baums' house in Chicago on 68 Humboldt Boulevard, where The Wonderful Wizard of Oz was written

Maud's mother Matilda frequently spent the winter at their house, as she did when Maud and Frank were residents of Aberdeen. Maud cherished her mother's visits, especially when Frank traveled for his job. During this time, Maud discontinued attending the Episcopal Church, instead choosing to have her boys go to the West Side Ethical Culture Sunday School. She and Frank agreed with Matilda's spiritualist beliefs. Matilda favorably commented that the new school was where "morality and not religion is taught".

In Frank's first children's book, published in 1897, he wrote in Maud's copy:

One critic I always fear and long to please. It is my Sweetheart. Shall I win her approval how vain would be the plaudits of the small remnant of humanity! I hope this book will succeed, for her sake, for we need the money success would bring. But aside from that sordid fact I care little what the world thinks of it. The vital question is: What does my sweetheart, my wife of fifteen years, think of it?

Frank relied on Maud to give him advice about business decisions. His publisher, F. K. Reilly, began to presume that Frank's letter would start with "After a conference with Mrs. Baum ... I have decided to ..." Reilly considered Maud to be one of Frank's finest pundits.

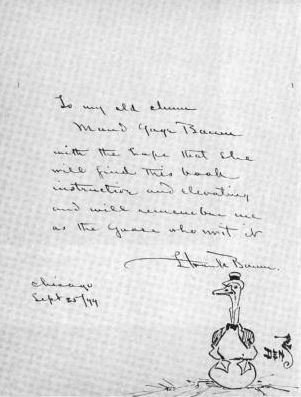
Inscription in Maud's copy of Father Goose, His Book, signed by both L. Frank Baum and W. W. Denslow in 1899

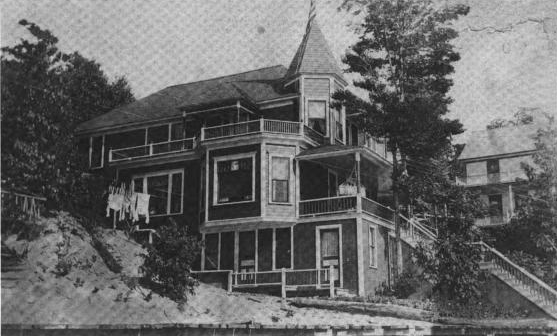
The Sign of the Goose, Macatawa Park, Michigan

After Frank's publication of Father Goose: His Book, the best-selling picture book in 1900, the family began to live a comfortable life. They passed their summers at Macatawa Park, Michigan, where Frank purchased a cottage, christening it the "Sign of a Goose". On November 17, 1900, Frank transferred the literary rights of his most recent books—Mother Goose in Prose, Father Goose: His Book, A New Wonderland (later published as The Magical Monarch of Mo), and From Kansas to Fairyland (later published as The Wonderful Wizard of Oz)—to Maud. Maud gave Frank $1,000 to validate the contract, and the signing of the contract was witnessed by W. W. Denslow and Ann Waters.

Frequently, the family had "musical evenings" in their home that lasted about an hour. While Frank sang folk songs and played the square piano, Maud played mandolins and the violin while the children played various instruments. When it was the boys' bedtime, Maud would sew while Frank wrote. Maud's niece, Matilda Jewell Gage, frequently paid visits to them. Enchanted by the Baums' extravagant way of living, she later wrote that "[t]hey represented to me something that I knew nothing about. I was thrilled with the things they did, their food, the household, everything." (Note: Frank, in 1903, had given Matilda Gage five dollars, a "larger sum than she had ever had". Enraptured, Matilda was told that the money had "to be spent entirely for nonsense, and by you. Not a sensible thing must be bought with it.")

==== Parenting ====
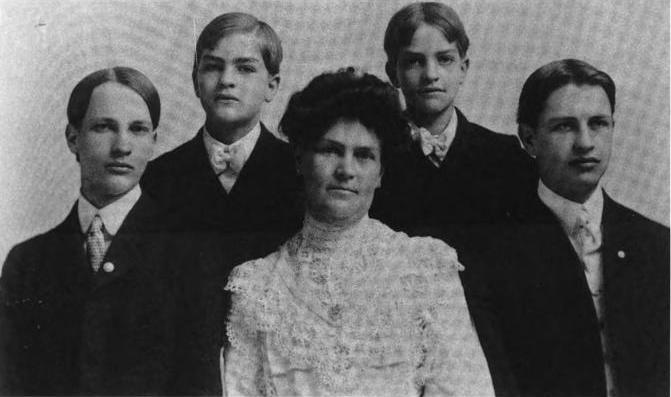
Maud Gage Baum and her four sons, Robert, Harry, Kenneth and Frank, in 1900

A strict disciplinarian, Maud chastised Frank Junior after he stumbled into a pan of paste not once but twice. Despite her protests, her husband brought dinner to the boy in his room, telling him a story and staying by his side until he fell asleep. After her second son, Robert, flung from their second-story window their cat, who escaped uninjured, Maud decided to "teach him a lesson". Collaring him, she suspended him through their second-story window, "making him "screa[m] so loudly that the neighbors all rushed out and were quite horrified at the spectacle of my mother dangling me out the window". Later, he flung a cat into a barrel, whereupon Maud "promptly chucked in myself to see how I liked it".

One day, her youngest son, Ken, was misbehaving. Maud ordered Frank to spank the child, and he begrudgingly complied. After Ken went to bed crying, Frank felt so discomforted that he was unable to eat dinner. He walked upstairs, woke Ken up, and apologized, saying, "I'll never spank any of you children again." Frank once said that "If I had my way, I would always have a young child in the house." Maud rejoined, "If I had my way, I wouldn't!" Because Frank was frequently absent for work-related matters, for most of the time, Maud needed to care for the sons single-handedly. To lessen the burdens of keeping house, Maud also paid a "girl" to help her.

==== Oz and later years (1900–1953) ====
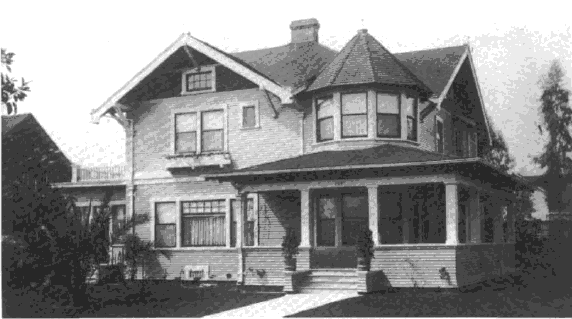
Ozcot, Hollywood, California, in 1911

One night, Frank told his family a story about how a cyclone propelled a young boy to an enchanted world. Peering down at a file cabinet marked O–Z, he answered his son's query about the enchanted land's name: "Oz". Maud supported him in this venture, and he began penning the stories which he would submit for publishing. Author Marlene Wagman-Geller stated that Maud "was, in this manner, the mother of Oz".

Traveling from her home in Chicago to Bloomington, Maud frequently paid visits to her sister Helen and her infant daughter, Dorothy Louise Gage. The infant became gravely sick and died on November 15, 1898, of "congestion of the brain" at five months and four days old. Her date of death is incorrectly carved as November 11, 1898, but the official records and death announcement all say November 15, 1898. When the baby, whom Maud adored as the daughter she never had, died, she was devastated and needed to consume medicine. In a letter to her sister, Maud wrote, "Dorothy was a beautiful baby. I could have taken her for my very own and loved her devotedly". To assuage her distress, Frank made his protagonist of The Wonderful Wizard of Oz a girl named Dorothy. (Note: Historian Sally Roesch Wagner discovered Dorothy Gale's namesake, Dorothy Louise Gage, who was Maud's five-month old niece. She learned about Dorothy Gage from Dorothy Gage's sister years before 1982. Wagner traveled to Evergreen Cemetery in Bloomington, Illinois around 1982, where she discovered Dorothy Gage's tombstone. When documents at the cemetery pointed Wagner to a "tiny gray stone, its letters reduced to illegible grooves", McLean County Historical Society director Greg Koos recommended that she try an "old genealogy trick". The trick involved smearing shaving cream over the tombstone and brushing the surplus aside to see the letters. Wagner said in a 1982 interview with the Associated Press, "I brought the squeegee down and there was 'Dorothy.' It took on life then. She really was buried in Bloomington. There really was a Dorothy." Baum biographer Michael Patrick Hearn told the Associated Press in 1982, "She was too important to the family. I think her death certainly gave (Baum) the name, and I think he modeled Dorothy on his nieces.") Frank dedicated the book to her, writing "to my good friend and comrade, My Wife". Historian Sally Roesch Wagner, who discovered Dorothy Gale's namesake, told the Associated Press in 1982, "He gave Maud her Dorothy in an immortal way." Elizabeth Letts writes, "This theory is less compelling...Frank used the name Dorothy in a story published in 1897, before niece Dorothy was born." Dorothy Gage's sister Matilda, from whom Wagner had learned of the existence of Dorothy, felt that the name was simply a popular name of the time and had no extra significance.

Although The Wonderful Wizard of Oz was very profitable, the family had little cash shortly before Christmas 1900. The book's initial royalty was to be given to Frank in January, but Maud told Frank to ask for it in advance to purchase Christmas gifts. Begrudgingly, Frank requested and received the money, pocketing it. Not glancing at the amount, Frank returned home, finding Maud ironing his shirt. He gave her the money after she asked for it. Anticipating it to be no more than $100, Maud was shocked and delighted to find that the check was for $3,432.64. Maud misremembered the iron during the ensuing flurry and burned Frank's shirt. (Note: The amount of the check is disputed. On November 8, 1908, the Daily Union published an article titled "Frank Baum's Manager Tells How Check for $13,700 Awakened Author to Real Merit of His First Published Work". On September 22, 1939, Maud told the radio show Ripley's Believe It or Not! that the amount was $13,000. However, W. W. Denslow—who received the same royalty as that of Baum—recorded in his account book that the amount due was $3,432.64.)

In 1906, because of Frank's literary successes and the profitable royalties from the 1902 Wizard of Oz musical, Maud and Frank were wealthy enough to travel around Egypt, Greece, Italy, North Africa, Switzerland, and France on a six-month expedition. During their traveling, Maud saw an Egyptian harem and enthusiastically climbed the Great Pyramid of Giza. A year later, her husband published In Other Lands Than Ours, which he compiled from Maud's letters to people at home. Published in modest quantity, the book was for friends and family. She asked Frank to edit her work, and he also included a foreword and sixteen photographs that he had taken of the trip. Maud loved Egypt, writing that "never have we enjoyed anything more or been so intensely interested". Baum scholar Katharine M. Rogers noted that Maud's letters "demonstrate intellectual curiosity and a sense of humor".

In celebration of their silver wedding (25th anniversary) in 1907, Frank sent out an invitation to their friends and family that included a summation of their marriage:

Quarrels: Just a few.
Wife in tears: Three times (cat died; bonnet spoiled; sore toe).
Husband swore: One thousand one hundred and eighty-seven times; at wife, 0.
Causes of jealousy: 0. (Remarkable in an age of manicured men and beauty doctor women.)
Broke, occasionally; bent, often.
Unhappy, 0.

Frank sent the "tongue-in-cheek" letter without telling Maud.

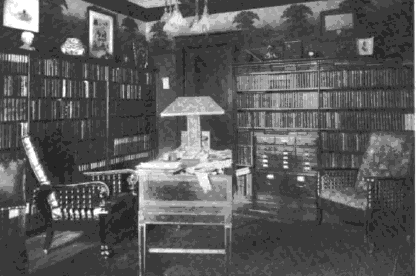
Ozcot library in 1911

Moving to Hollywood from Chicago due to Frank's failing health, the family had a house custom-built, that they called Ozcot in 1910 using Maud's inheritance money from her mother. They obtained a puppy that they christened Toto. Frank plastered the full length of one of Ozcot's walls, which he named "Yard of Maud", with his most beloved pictures of her.

On the night of Frank's death on May 16, 1919, Maud imparted in a letter to her relatives, Helen Leslie and Leslie Gage:

He told me many times I was the only one he had ever loved. He hated to die, did not want to leave me, said he was never happy without me, but it was better he should go first, if it had to be, for I doubt if he could have got along without me. It is all so sad, and I am so forlorn and alone. For nearly thirty-seven years we had been everything to each other, we were happy, and now I am alone, to face the world alone.

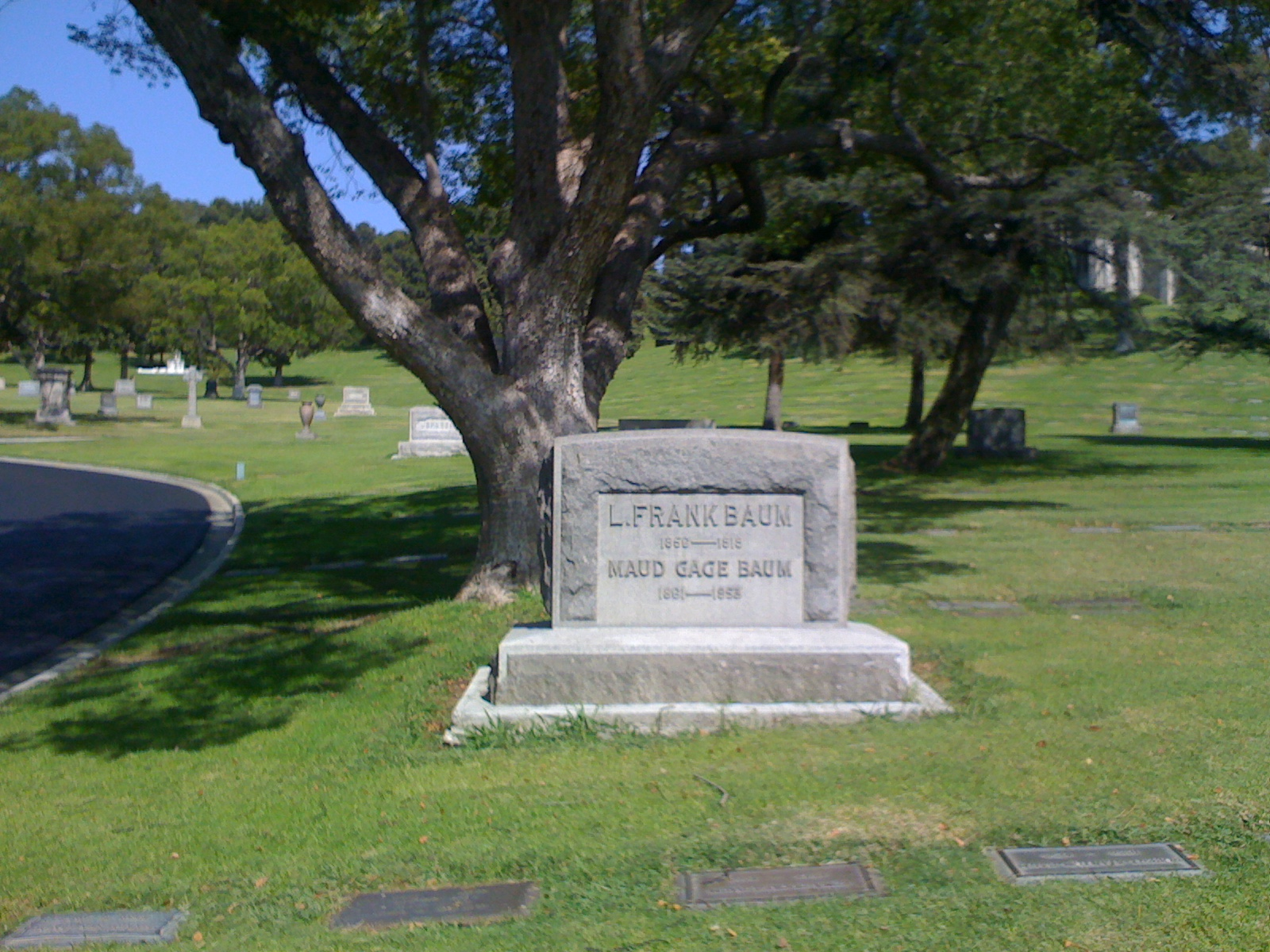
Tombstone of Maud and Frank at Forest Lawn Memorial Park in Glendale, California, Los Angeles, California

Metro-Goldwyn-Mayer (MGM) paid Gage to help promote their 1939 film, The Wizard of Oz. She was interviewed on the radio program Ripley's Believe It or Not!, where she discussed how Frank's story began. She was also photographed with the film's main star Judy Garland, with whom she dined.

After her husband's death in 1919, Maud designated Ruth Plumly Thompson to create more Oz sequels. Four years before her death, she slipped and broke her hip, remaining bedridden for the rest of her life. Surviving her husband by 34 years, Maud died at Ozcot (Note: Frank lived in Ozcot until he died in 1919. Maud remained in the house until her death, after which it was razed and substituted with an apartment house.) on the night of March 6, 1953, 21 days before her 92nd birthday. Maud was survived by her four sons (Note: When Maud died, Frank Joslyn Baum was living in Westwood, Los Angeles; Robert Stanton Baum in Claremont, California; Harry Neal Baum in Hinsdale, Illinois; and Kenneth Gage Baum in La Cañada Flintridge, California.), nieces Leslie and Matilda Gage, and several grandchildren.
