= Roy McCardell =

American journalist, writer and comics author

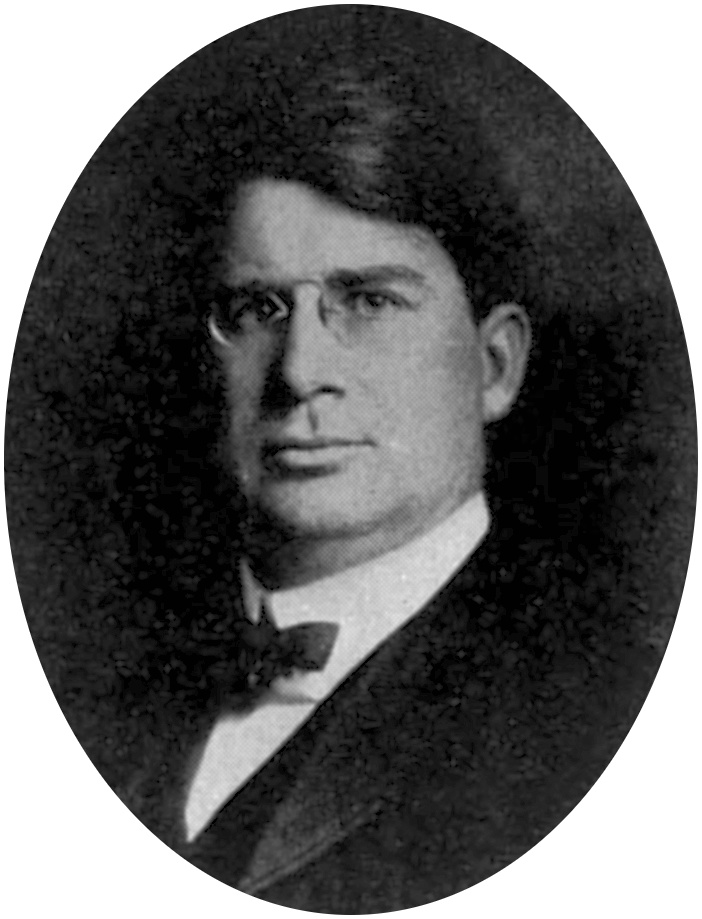
- Born: Roy Larcom McCardell; June 30, 1870 Hagerstown, Maryland, US
- Died: Unknown
- Areas: Writer, Editor
- Notable works: Sunday World Sunday comic supplement, Jarr Family. A Fool There Was
- Collaborators: Richard F. Outcault

Roy Larcom McCardell (June 30, 1870 – after 1940) was an American journalist, scenarist, humorist and writer.

== Early life ==
Roy McCardell was born in 1870 in Hagerstown, Maryland. His father was the editor of the Hagerstown Mail. When his father became the editor of the Evening Times in Cumberland, Maryland, the family moved there, where Roy attended school until he was twelve. He then started writing for his father's newspaper before becoming a regular contributor to Puck, the leading American satirical magazine.

== Career ==
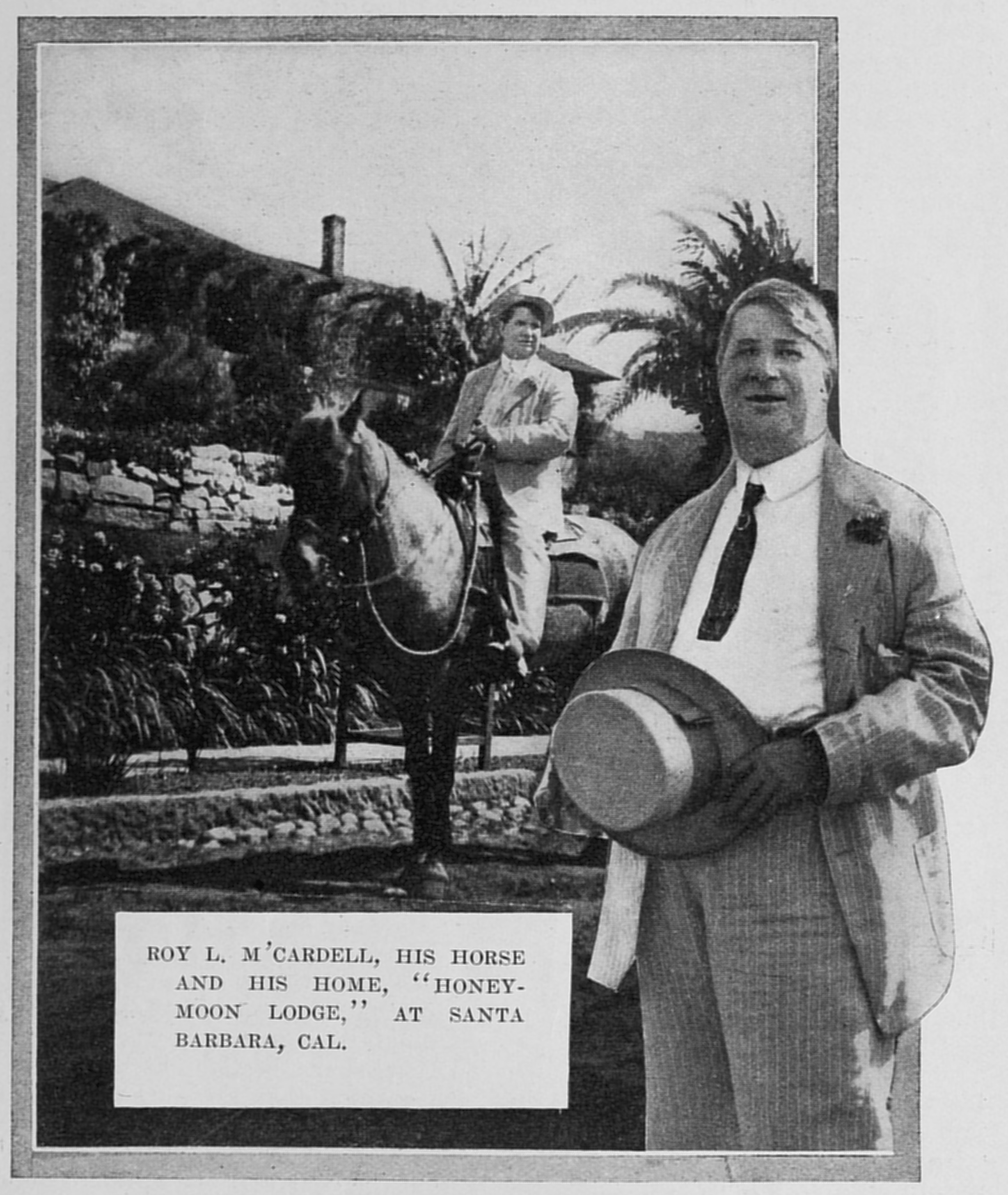
Roy McCardell during his Hollywood period

McCardell moved to Birmingham, Alabama at age 17 to work as a reporter for the Age-Herald. Many of his contributions were reprinted in magazines, including Frank Leslie's Weekly. New York City newspaper editor Arthur Brisbane became aware of his writing, and offered him a position on the New York newspaper The Evening Sun. Along with his newspaper reporting, McCardell also provided serialized novels to the newspaper. He then moved on to the New York World and finally became a staff member of Puck. McCardell also worked as an editor for a number of newspapers and magazines, including the New York Morning Telegraph and the Metropolitan Magazine. He wrote a number of syndicated serialised articles, most famously the daily Jarr Family which appeared in several hundred newspapers.

In 1896, when McCardell learned that the New York World had acquired a color press, he suggested that they use it to produce a comic supplement. Editor Morrill Goddard approved the idea, but all comic artists of the day were already contracted by other newspapers. McCardell suggested using the young artist Richard F. Outcault. Goddard supervised the new supplement, made by Outcault and McCardell, and the first Sunday paper comic supplement in color was the November 6, 1896 issue of the Sunday World, featuring The Yellow Kid. The circulation of the Sunday paper increased from about 140,000 to 800,000 in the next six months, but dropped again to 400,000 after Outcault moved to the New York Sunday American.

In 1897 McCardell began writing movie scenarios, eventually finishing over a thousand scripts. He has been credited as the first person hired by a movie company, in this case American Mutoscope and Biograph Company in 1900, to produce stories. His best-known scenario was A Fool There Was (1915), popularizing the movie vampire. Many of his scenarios and his other writings won prizes in competitions held by Puck and Collier's Weekly. His scenario for a 1915 film serial, The Diamond from the Sky, won a $10,000 prize from the American Film Company. That film was exhibited in some 8,000 US theaters and also overseas, but no prints have survived to the present.

McCardell wrote book reviews, songs, poetry and sketches. He wrote one stage play, The Gay Life. He appeared as himself in the extended version of the Winsor McCay animated movie Gertie the Dinosaur (1914). He spent most of his time on movie writing and on maintaining the Jarr Family serial.

McCardell spent most of his adult life in New Rochelle, New York. His daughter Frances, born in 1892, was an expert automobile driver by age 14, when she won a Cadillac. She eloped at age 18 with a wealthy 30-year-old man. McCardell also had one other child, his daughter Dorothy.

== Filmography ==
Among the more than 1,000 scenarios McCardell wrote are the following movies and serials:

- 1914: The Awful Adventures of an Aviator, The Idler
- 1915: A Fool There Was
- 1915: The Diamond from the Sky, 30 episodes, now lost
- 1916: Walk This Way
- 1920: The Evil Eye, 15 episodes, now lost

== Bibliography ==
- 1899: The Wage Slaves of New York
- 1900: Olde love and lavender & other verses (poetry collection)
- 1903: Conversations of a Chorus Girl, 188 pages, illustrated by Gene Carr
- 1903: Rise and Shine Stories
- 1904: The Show Girl and Her Friends, 200 pages, illustrated by Gene Carr
- 1906: Mr. and Mrs. Nagg
- 1907: Jimmy Jones, autobiography of an office boy, 310 pages
- 1907: The Jarr Family
- 1916: The Diamond from the Sky, 440 pages
- 1930: My Aunt Angie
- 1931: The book of my Uncle Oswald, 286 pages
