= A Modern Magdalen =

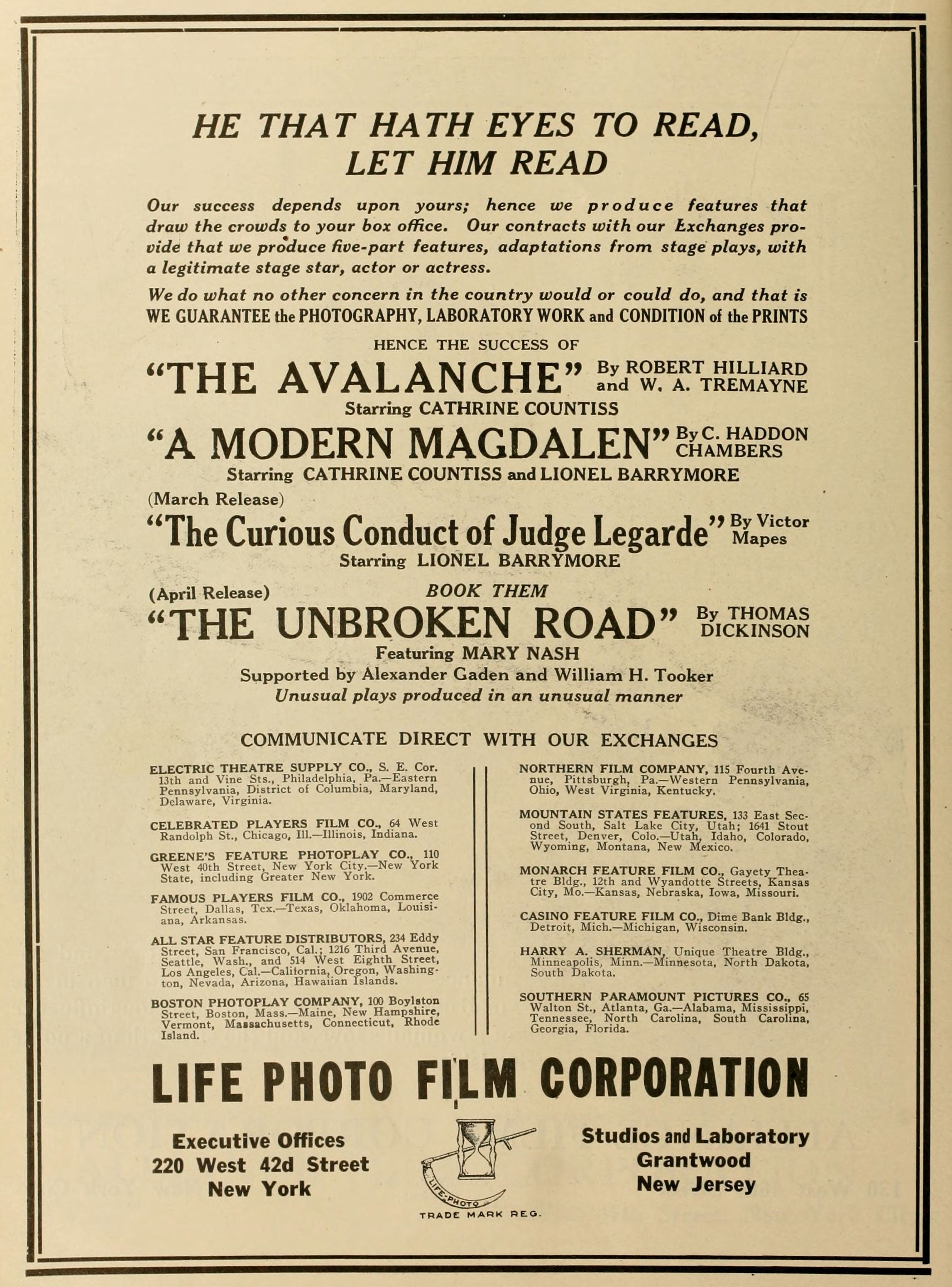
- Trade Magazine Advertisement
- Directed by: Will S. Davis
- Written by: C. Haddon Chambers
- Production company: Life Photo Film Corporation
- Distributed by: Life Photo Film Corporation
- Release date: February 17, 1915
- Country: United States

A Modern Magdalen is a lost 1915 American drama, 5-reel silent black and white film directed by Will S. Davis and based on the 1902 play by C. Haddon Chambers. The film was produced and released by the Life Photo Film Corporation in their studios in Grantwood, New Jersey.

== Cast ==
- Cathrine Countiss as Katinka Jenkins
- Lionel Barrymore as Lindsay
- William H. Tooker as Joe Mercer
- Charles E. Graham as Katinka's father
- Marjorie Nelson as Olivia Jenkins

== Preservation ==
With no holdings located in archives, A Modern Magdalen is considered a lost film.
