= Frank Joslyn Baum =

American film producer

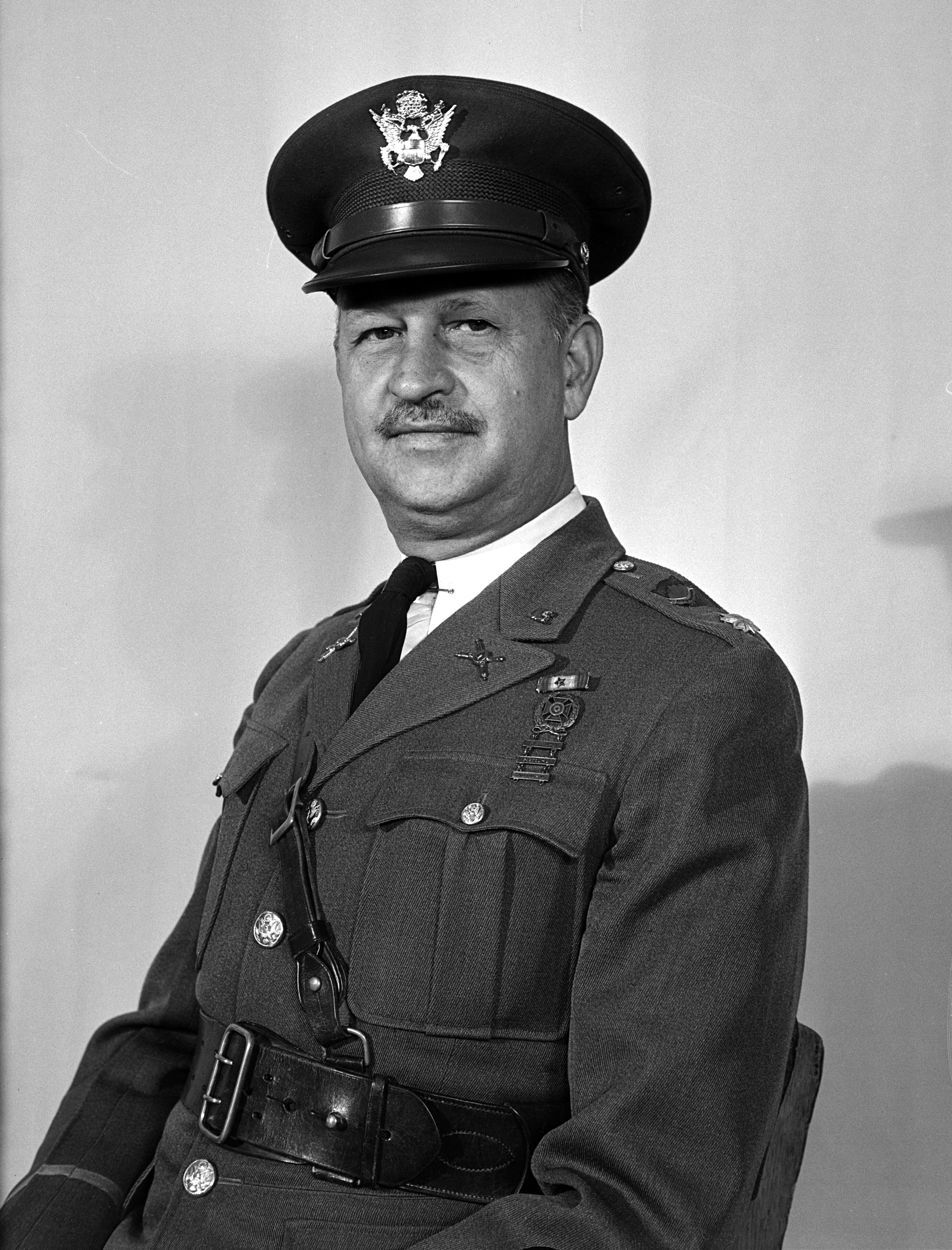
- Baum in 1936
- Born: December 3, 1883
- Died: December 2, 1958 (aged 74)
- Education: Society for Ethical Culture; Michigan Military School, Orchard Lake, Michigan; Cornell University
- Occupations: Lawyer; soldier; writer; film producer
- Spouses: Helen Louise Snow (m. 1906) Rosine Agnes Shafer Brubeck (m. 1932; died 1934) Margaret Elizabeth Ligon Turner (m. 1940)
- Parents: L. Frank Baum; Maud Gage
- Relatives: Matilda Joslyn Gage (maternal grandmother); Harry Neal Baum (brother); Roger S. Baum (grandson)
- Military career
- Allegiance: United States
- Branch: United States Army
- Rank: Lieutenant Colonel
- Conflicts: Philippine-American War; World War I

Frank Joslyn Baum (December 3, 1883 – December 2, 1958) was an American lawyer, soldier, writer, and film producer, and the first president of The International Wizard of Oz Club.

He is best known as the author of To Please a Child (a biography of his father, L. Frank Baum) (1962) and The Laughing Dragon of Oz (1934). He was involved in the production of Wizard of Oz (1925), and The Wizard of Oz (1933), for which he also received writing credit, after which he sold The Wonderful Wizard of Oz film rights to Samuel Goldwyn.

His attempt to trademark the Oz name distanced him from the rest of his family. In addition, To Please a Child has been suspect since before it was published, as most of his family refused to confirm any details about his father's life, leading Baum to fabricate some details.

== Early life and work ==
Baum was born December 3, 1883, to Lyman Frank Baum and Maud Gage Baum, known by the nickname "Bunny". Like his brothers, Robert Stanton, Harry Neal, and Kenneth Gage, he attended the Society for Ethical Culture Sunday school, which taught morality without religion, as the Baums considered religion a mature decision. Despite his father's unflattering caricatures of the military, Baum had always desired to become a soldier, and he attended Michigan Military School in Orchard Lake, Michigan. He briefly attended Cornell University, studying law, and he would act as his parents' lawyer when they traveled abroad. He enlisted in the U.S. Army and served in the Philippines in 1904. He married Helen Louise Snow on June 27, 1906. His first notable contribution to the cinema was when he served as the projectionist for The Fairylogue and Radio-Plays (1908). Although he could not have the control that writers such as William K. Everson, Yuri Tsivian, and others have claimed that early cinema projectionists had, due to the presence of the filmmakers in the room each night, it was a foray into the cinema that would pave the way for things to come. He also worked briefly for his father's publisher, Reilly & Britton, worked in advertising in Chicago. He was the first member of the Baum family to move to the Los Angeles area.

== Dramatic feature films ==
When L. Frank Baum founded The Oz Film Manufacturing Company in 1914, Frank J. was established as the business director in the New York City office, at 300 W. 42nd Street in Times Square. After the company's failure, Frank J. regrouped the organization under the name Dramatic Feature Films. Exhibitors, however, were aware of the name change and were not interested in the Oz product by any name at all. Frank J. probably wrote the scripts for its two known films, The Gray Nun of Belgium, a five-reel feature set during "the present war in Europe", and Pies and Poetry, a short film, probably a slapstick comedy, although little is actually known about it beyond that both starred Betty Pierce in the lead. Sometimes these scripts are attributed to L. Frank, though this is not the case. Soon after the venture ended, Baum re-enlisted in the army and fought in World War I, achieving the rank of lieutenant colonel.

== Wizard of Oz ==
After the death of L. Frank Baum, Ruth Plumly Thompson was selected to continue the Oz series by publishers Reilly & Lee. Frank Joslyn Baum had some desire to continue the series himself, but he represented his mother, who had turned over the rights to The Wonderful Wizard of Oz to him once she had gotten them back from Harrison Rountree, who had acquired them after L. Frank Baum's bankruptcy, in this decision. After a long separation, Baum divorced his wife in 1921. Baum licensed the novel to I. E. Chadwick and Larry Semon, who created Wizard of Oz (1925). The film that was ultimately created bears the writing credit "L. Frank Baum, Jr., Leon Lee, and Larry Semon", with Lee also credited as title writer, though Frank J. may or may not have actually collaborated on the screenplay. The film bears almost no resemblance to the novel, but certainly seems to borrow on suggestions from His Majesty, the Scarecrow of Oz. That film has a King Krewl, this film a Prime Minister Kruel. The novel that followed the film, The Scarecrow of Oz, also mentions a deceased King Kynd, and there is a Prince Kynd in this film, to which was added a Lady Vishuss for the new film. The film depicts Dorothy Gale as an eighteen-year-old princess betrothed to Prince Kynd, whose throne is coveted by the Prime Minister and his Lady. A Scarecrow, Tin Woodsman [ sic ], and Cowardly Lion all appear, but they are nothing more than men who have put on disguises to avoid capture. The film bankrupted the studio, Chadwick Pictures, and it did not get a wide release.

A marriage to Rosine Agnes Shafer Brubeck lasted from July 29, 1932, to her death on September 2, 1934. In 1933, Baum, credited as "Col. Frank Baum" may also have written Ted Eshbaugh's animated short, The Wizard of Oz, or he may simply have negotiated the license.

== The Laughing Dragon controversy ==
Baum was undaunted, and claimed to have written a 1931 radio drama called Tweety in Oz, though no script has ever been found, which he followed with a 1934 story, Jimmy Bulber in Oz, which was printed in order to achieve a trademark on the name "Oz" (it would later be reprinted in the International Wizard of Oz Club's Oziana). He demanded that Reilly & Lee cease and desist publishing Oz books. Maud, who was the one who made the agreement with the publishers, had to sue him to get the trademark back, and she took Frank J. out of her will.

Finally, as "Frank Baum", he produced a two-part manuscript called Rosine and the Laughing Dragon that was broken into The Laughing Dragon of Oz and The Enchanted Princess of Oz. He barely mentioned Oz in the text, and no Oz characters were used except for his own and a brief mention of the Wizard. His publisher, Whitman, was sued by Reilly & Lee after publishing the first part in its Big Little Books series in 1936. The book quickly went out of print and Whitman agreed not to publish the sequel. Baum sold the rights to The Wonderful Wizard of Oz to Samuel Goldwyn on January 26, 1934, for $60,000. Goldwyn sat on the rights, and ultimately sold them to MGM for the production of The Wizard of Oz (1939), for which Goldwyn saw a large profit that none of the Baums did.

== To Please a Child and Oz Club Presidency ==
Baum married Margaret Elizabeth Ligon Turner on August 19, 1940. After Maud died in 1953, he was admitted back into The Baum Trust, but he had gained only the tolerance, and not the faith of his family. From time to time he would write articles about his father's work, the most notable being "The Oz Film Co.", which appeared in the August–September 1956 Films in Review, which appeared when the films had been generally forgotten. When Justin G. Schiller founded the International Wizard of Oz Club, Baum was appointed its first president, and served in that position until his death. He had been friendly with the founding members, who were unaware of his family conflicts. He had been working in near-isolation on a biography of his father, eventually titled To Please a Child, derived from an inscription L. Frank Baum wrote in his sister Mary Louise's copy of The Wonderful Wizard of Oz, after a suggestion by Fred M. Meyer, the club secretary. His brother Robert was the only member of his family to provide any information. Russell P. MacFall became his collaborator, but he had difficulty speaking with Baum's family. They were willing to discuss family matters only after Baum had died. Reilly and Lee had imposed a 1961 deadline, and the book that appeared is filled with Frank Joslyn Baum's mythologizing about his father, claiming so far as that L. Frank Baum had had a heart attack at age 12 and had marched in a torchlight parade in support of William Jennings Bryan's presidential candidacy, both of which were fabrications.

Baum died from a heart attack on December 2, 1958, a day before his 75th birthday.

== Legacy ==
Frank Joslyn Baum is grandfather of Roger S. Baum, who similarly writes Oz books within a mythos that appears to be distinct from the one about which L. Frank Baum wrote.

The Dreamer of Oz: The L. Frank Baum Story credits Michael Patrick Hearn as a principal source. While Hearn collaborated with David Brooks on the original treatment, the final script by Richard Matheson primarily relied upon To Please a Child. In the film, Frank Joslyn Baum (called "Frank, Jr." in the credits) was played by three actors, Joshua Boyd (age 3), Tim Eyster (ages 5–9), and Christopher Pettiet (teenage).
