= Dramatic Feature Films =

Film venture by Frank Joslyn Baum

Dramatic Feature Films was an unsuccessful silent film venture by Frank Joslyn Baum, son of L. Frank Baum. The office was at 300 West 42nd Street in New York City (the building that currently houses the Times Square McDonald's in its first floors), while the films were made in the Hollywood studios of The Oz Film Manufacturing Company, which was the company's former identity. It was absorbed by Goldwyn Pictures in 1916.

Two films are known to have been produced by the company, neither of which survive. These include a slapstick short titled Pies and Poetry starring Betty Pierce. Pierce, along with Catherine Countiss and David Proctor starred in The Gray Nun of Belgium. The film was directed by Francis Powers from a script by Baum (some sources say the elder) and set during World War I. Advertisements in the trade papers gave the film a release date of April 26, 1915; however, it is now believed that the film was never released. The distributor, Alliance Film Program, apparently found the film inferior and refused to buy it.
