= The Gray Nun of Belgium =

- Directed by: Francis Powers
- Written by: Frank Joslyn Baum (or possibly L. Frank Baum)
- Produced by: Frank Joslyn Baum; P. Sumner Brown
- Starring: Cathrine Countiss; Betty Pierce; David Proctor
- Production company: Dramatic Feature Films
- Distributed by: Alliance Films Corporation (announced)
- Release date: April 26, 1915 (announced)
- Country: United States
- Language: English (titles)

The Gray Nun of Belgium was a 1915 film announced for release on the Alliance Program by Dramatic Feature Films, Frank Joslyn Baum's short-lived successor to The Oz Film Manufacturing Company.

Despite the advertising in Motion Picture News announcing its release date, Katharine Rogers, in L. Frank Baum: Creator of Oz, believes that Alliance found the film inferior and refused to distribute it. The exhibition copy, which may have been a work print, may have been the only copy ever struck. Baum himself thought that exchanges and exhibitors dismissed the film "rather arbitrarily" based on the Oz Company name.

In the film, Betty Pierce played a Mother Superior who aided Allied soldiers during World War I. Cathrine Countiss played the title role. It also starred David Proctor, Mae Wells, Katherine Griffith, Raymond Russell, Robert Dunbar, Harry Clements, and James Spencer. Wells and Russell were prominent actors in the Oz Company, having played roles such as Mombi and Dr. Pipt, respectively.
