= The Idler (film) =

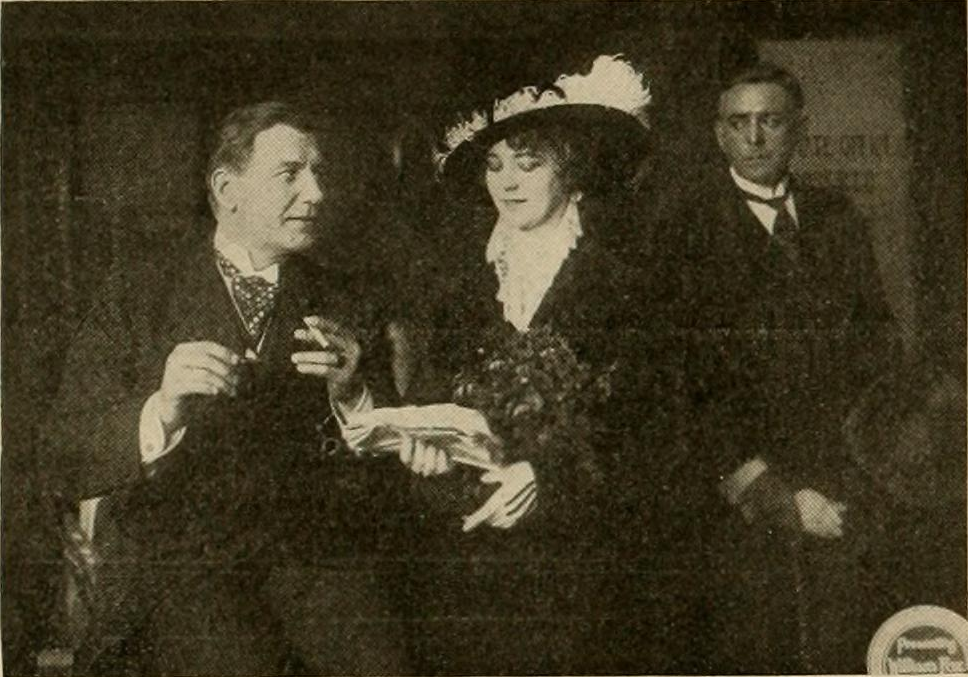
- Directed by: Lloyd B. Carleton
- Written by: Roy L. McCardell
- Based on: The Idler by C. Haddon Chambers
- Produced by: William Fox
- Production company: Box Office Attractions Co.
- Distributed by: Box Office Attraction Co.
- Release date: December 1914
- Running time: 5 reels
- Country: USA
- Language: Silent (English intertitles)

The Idler is a lost 1914 American silent drama film directed by Lloyd B. Carleton and starring Charles Richman from a screenplay by Roy L. McCardell, based on the play of the same name by C. Haddon Chambers. The film was produced and distributed by Box Office Attractions Co., the predecessor to Fox Film.

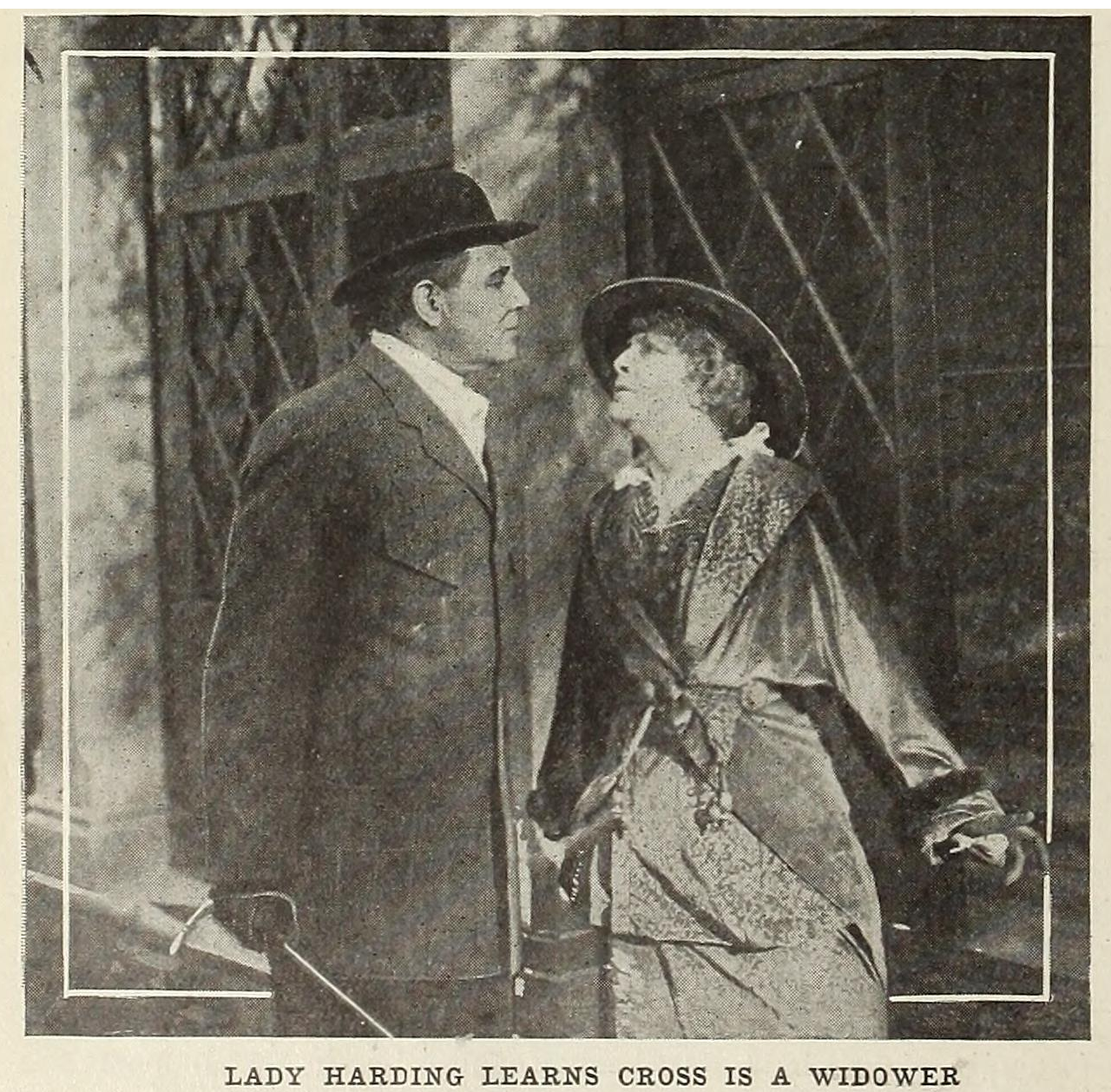
Charles Richman and Catherine Countiss

== Plot ==
According to a film magazine, "'The Idler' is Mark Cross, a young man of good family, who in a wild fit of daredeviltry has emigrated from London to the far west. John Harding, also well-born of wealthy parents, but disinherited, and a poor clerk, is also seeking his fortune in the gold fields. One day Harding receives a letter from a firm of London solicitors informing him that his father has died and that he is now Sir John Harding, Bart. He sets out at once to make his preparations for his return to civilization and to take up the station in life that is rightfully his. But that very day he becomes involved in a quarrel with Felix Strong, the young brother of a miner named Simeon Strong, and Felix is shot accidentally during the dispute. Harding is accused of murder, but flees to England in time to escape the vengeance of a posse, headed by Simeon Strong, who is determined to avenge his brother.

Years after in London, Harding, who has married the girl both he and Cross were in love with before they emigrated, comes face to face with Cross and Strong, who have become partners and have 'struck it rich.' In order to win Lady Harding for his own Cross allows the evil side of his nature to get the upper hand of him and plots to have Strong kill Sir John in a duel. Strong slaps Harding in the face in the foyer of the opera house in order that he may involve him in 'an affair of honor' and avenge his brother's death by killing Harding. Cross in the meantime lures Lady Harding to his rooms where Sir John comes to seek her. She hides in Mark Cross' bedroom, but reveals herself at a dramatic moment when Harding, shouting 'Curse you, I'll kill you!' springs at Cross' throat. Her splendid nature, as shown in her denunciation of both men, one as a husband without faith in his wife and the other as the would-be destroyer of a home, overcomes them with shame. They shake hands and Mark, parting forever with Lady Harding, orders his valet to pack his things for he is off 'on a long trail.'"

== Cast ==
- Charles Richman as Mark Cross
- Catherine Countiss as Lady Helen Merryweather Harding
- Walter Hitchcock as Sir John Harding
- Claire Whitney as Kate Merryweather
- Stuart Holmes as Simeon Strong
- Maude Turner Gordon as Inez
- W. T. Carleton
- Harry Spingler

== Production ==
Production began on October 29 at the Pathe studios in Jersey City, and wrapped up in December 1914. Over 200 people were transported to Virginia Harned's estate in Harrison, New York, where outdoor scenes were filmed.

== Reception ==
Moving Picture World reviewer George Blaisdell gave the film a positive review, praising the performances of the cast, despite finding the adaptation of the story to have "a lack of clarity, of cohesiveness."

Motion Picture News reviewer Peter Milne described the film as "slightly confusing" due to its lack of cohesive subtitles.

== Preservation ==
With no holdings located in archives, The Idler is considered a lost film.
