= The Maid of Arran =

Musical play by L. Frank Baum

- An Irish Idyl in 5 Acts
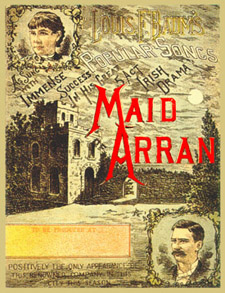
- Cover of the song-book
- Music: L. Frank Baum
- Lyrics: L. Frank Baum
- Book: L. Frank Baum
- Basis: A Princess of Thule by William Black
- Productions: Touring: 1882-1883; Syracuse 1885

The Maid of Arran, An Idyllic Irish Drama Written for the People, Irrespective of Caste or Nationality is an 1882 musical play by L. Frank Baum, writing and performing under the pseudonym, "Louis F. Baum", based on the novel A Princess of Thule by William Black. It was described as "A Play to Ensnare All Hearts and Leave an Impress of Beauty and Nobility Within the Sordid Mind of Man." The play resets the novel from Scotland's Outer Hebrides to Ireland (although Arran is actually in Scotland—Baum probably meant Aran, but never changed it). This was a well-received melodrama with elaborate stage effects, including a storm upon a ship, and an original score by Baum himself. Only the song-book for the windows use survives, which omits two of the songs referenced in the script (the manuscript did not include the lyrics). Baum played the main character, Hugh Holcomb, originally called Frank Lavender in the novel, in its initial tour (including two stints on Broadway), and later played Con. O'Mara, the heroine's father, in a community theatre revival.

The plot centers around Hugh who falls deeply in love with Sheila and convinces her to marry him. Reluctantly leaving her heartbroken father and her tight-knit island home behind, Sheila moves with Hugh back to the high-society world of London. However, the couple quickly encounters a severe cultural clash. Sheila struggles to adapt to the materialistic, rigid expectations of urban society, while Hugh grows increasingly distant, influenced by the shallow distractions of his wealthy peers.

== Adaptation ==
The play heavily alters Black's original to fit with the conventions of popular melodrama. The novel's sympathetic older male takes a Gregory Maguire-like turn that exists only in the mind of the novel's Frank Lavender. While Baum does not omit all of Lavender's unsympathetic qualities from Hugh, it is still quite obvious who we are to read as the hero, something Black leaves more to the reader to decide.

== Details ==
The play opened on Baum's 26th birthday, May 15, 1882, and headlined Agnes Hallock as Shiela O'Mara (Black's Sheila Mackenzie—note spelling difference), the daughter of the King of Arran, Con. O'Mara (John F. Ryan). She sang the songs "The Legend of Castle Arran" and "Ship Ahoy!", the latter being lost. Oona Kearney, the female character lead and equivalent of Black's Mairi, was played by Genevieve Rogers. Her songs included "Oona's Gift: A Tuft of the Old Irish Bog" and "A Pair o' Blue Eyes". Baum's aunt, Katharine Gray, who ran the Syracuse Oratory School, played Harriet Holcomb (Black's Caroline Lavender), and played a smaller role created by Baum, The Prophetess, under the name "Kate Roberts". Her maid, Gray (Black's Mrs. Paterson) was played by Cordie Aiken. John L. Morgan played Captain John Ingram, a moustache-twirling villain inspired by Black's Edward Ingram, who wants Shiela for himself. Edward Ingram merely offers her friendship that arouses Lavender's ire, partly because he's known Lavender long enough to understand how he can hurt people. Not remarked on much at the time were John H. Nicholson as Phadrig o' the Pipes, a very large but non-singing supporting role, based on Black's John the Piper. He is a friend to all the good guys and helps them out of jams, despite being a wiry old man. Mike J. Gallagher played the juvenile lead, Dennie, performing "A Rollicking Irish Boy". His character has no real equivalent in the novel, but has elements of Johnny Eyre and the much older character Duncan Macdonald. Mrs. Cecelia Lorraine comes over wholesale from the novel, but is only talked about, never shown (in the novel, she ultimately married Edward Ingram). Rounding out the original cast were C.F. Edwards as the Boatswain of the Malabar and C.H. Dennison as Fetchum, a valet not mentioned in the script. The other songs were "When O'Mara Is King Once Again", performed by Con. O'Mara, and "Sailing" performed by a chorus of sailors. Although the songs often interrupted the flow of the melodrama, they all grow out of the story and develop its characters, making it a primitive example of organic musical. "Oona's Gift" does the most to advance the story, and is indeed inspired by a scene in Black's novel. The play was very successful, especially with Irish audiences, in spite of its stereotyping, as it was much more sympathetic and, despite all its corny melodrama, did not reduce them to caricatures. The play, however, was panned in Richmond, Indiana, where it ultimately closed on June 7, 1883.

It returned to New York at the Academy of Music on Monday, October 9, for a one-week run. An undated program clipping held by The New York Public Library shows that there were several cast substitutions during the run, including Miron Leffingwell as Ingram, C.W. Charles as Con., Fred Lotto as Dennie, Frank Caisse as the Boatswain, Nellie Griffin as Gray, Mattie Ferguson as Oona, and Genevieve Roberts as the Prophetess. The rest of the cast remained the same. The New York Dramatic Mirror mentioned a Kate Castle in the cast, and referred to Katherine Gray as "then a 'kid'.".

== Song list ==
=== Act 1 ===
- "The Legend of Castle Arran"—Shiela
- "When O'Mara is King Once Again"—Shiela
- "A Rollicking Irish Boy"—Dennie

=== Act 2 ===
- "The Legend of Castle Arran" chorus reprise—Oona
- "Oona's Gift" ("A Tuft of the Old Irish Bog"/"A Turf from the Old Irish Sod") --Oona

=== Act 3 ===
No songs

=== Act 4 ===
- "Sailing"—Sailors
- "Waiting for the Tide to Turn"—Hugh

=== Act 5 ===
- "A Pair of Blue Eyes"—Oona

In addition, some programs report a song title "Ship Ahoy!" performed by Shiela, but it is not mentioned in the version of the script, which is dated March 20, 1884, that is owned by The New York Public Library and circulated on microfiche. Neither this song nor "Sailing" are in the published song book.

== Crew ==
Genevieve Roberts was the musical director. Baum fulfilled the functions of the director, a job that had not really taken an official hold at the time. Frank E. Aiken was the stage manager. The play was managed by John W. Baum and E.B. Brown.

== Performance history ==
Despite the fact that Baum himself performed in a revival, and its burst of popularity that caused Baum to expect a long acting career that never materialized, the play was never published, nor was its full score. The surviving scripts, which have never been published but are held in some libraries, may or may not reflect how it was actually played. When one of Baum's theatres in Richburg, New York, was destroyed in a fire, costumes, props, and scripts, including such lost plays as The Mackrummins and a successfully staged straight drama ironically titled Matches, which played in the theatre the night of the fire, were destroyed, perhaps in unique copy. W.E. Wing noted that it cost Baum at Mart Wagner their jobs. Wing stated that the theatre was worth $1,800, but that the box office did not burn, and that the script of The Maid of Arran was written "in the box office with the charred sides." The tone suggests some facetiousness on Wing's part.
