= Harry Neal Baum =

American author (1889-1967)

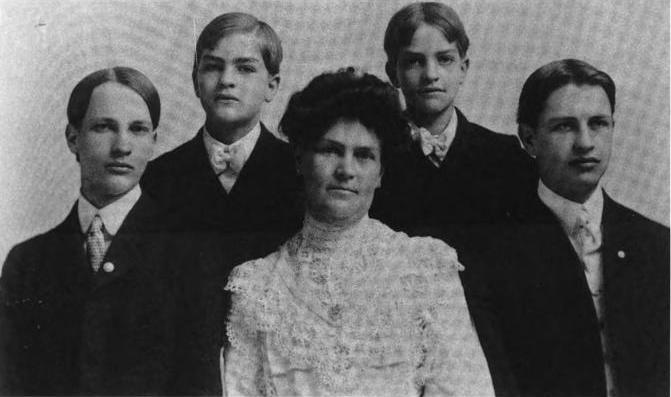
- Maud Gage Baum and her four sons, Robert, Harry, Kenneth, and Frank, 1900
- Born: December 18, 1889; Aberdeen, South Dakota, U.S.
- Died: June 7, 1967 (aged 77)
- Occupation: Writer
- Spouses: Mary Niles (m. 1910–19??); Brenda Holter (m. 1942)
- Children: 4
- Parent(s): L. Frank Baum; Maud Gage
- Relatives: Matilda Joslyn Gage (maternal grandmother); Frank Joslyn Baum (brother); Roger S. Baum (grandnephew)

Harry Neal Baum (December 18, 1889 – June 7, 1967) was an American author and the third son of L. Frank Baum. His father dedicated his 1902 novel The Life and Adventures of Santa Claus to him.

Baum, who received a Ph.D. in medieval history, wrote a number of history books for children. He worked in several advertising companies and ghostwrote the 1917 novel Mary Louise Solves a Mystery to satisfy his ailing father's publishing obligations.

== Early life ==
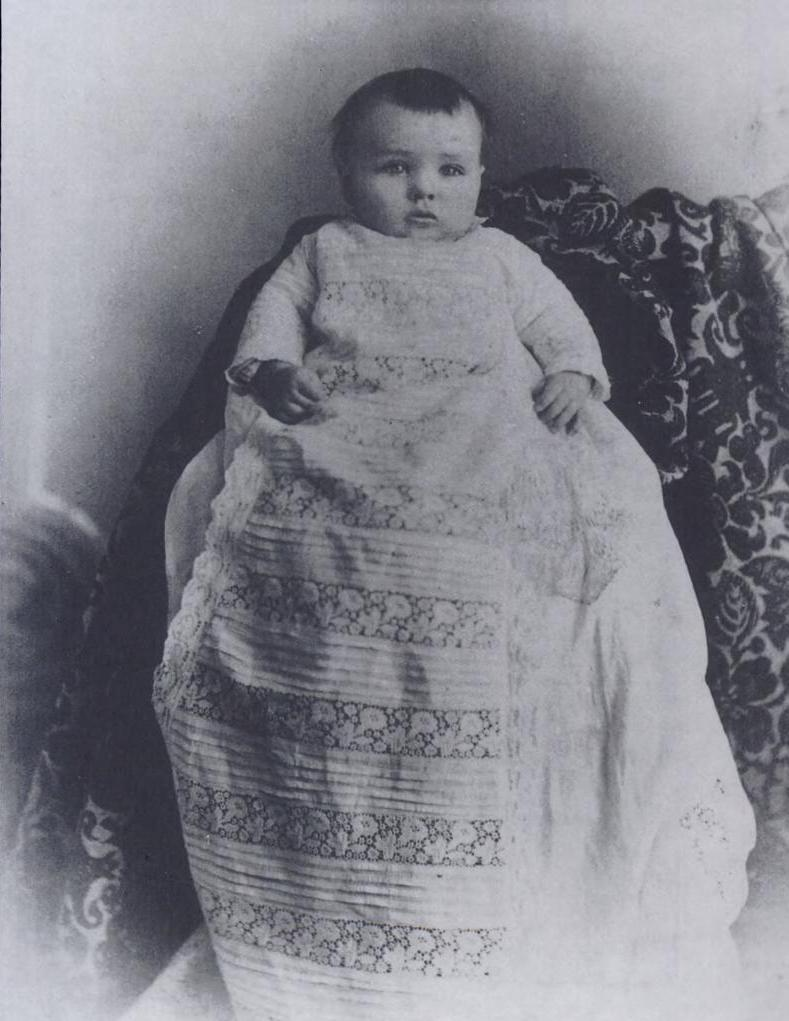
Four-month-old Harry Neal Baum in 1890

Raised in Chicago, Baum was born in Aberdeen, South Dakota, on December 18, 1889, to Maud Gage and L. Frank Baum. The third son of L. Frank Baum, the author of The Wonderful Wizard of Oz, he was named "Harry Neal Baum" to honor Harry Baum and Hattie and William Neal, L. Frank Baum's brother, sister, and brother-in-law, respectively. His brothers were Frank Joslyn, Robert Stanton, and Kenneth Gage.

== Career ==
Baum received a Ph.D. in medieval history and wrote three history books for children and articles about his father. He coauthored with Olive Beaupré Miller the Book of History, a 1929 four-volume work published by The Bookhouse for Children. He served as a vice president of Burson-Marsteller. He worked as an advertising manager at Fairbanks-Morse before being employed at Gebhardt & Brockson, a Chicago-based advertising company.

== The Wizard of Oz and personal life ==
L. Frank Baum dedicated his 1902 novel The Life and Adventures of Santa Claus to Harry. Because of L. Frank Baum's deteriorating health in 1917, he was unable to fulfill his obligations to his publishers. Therefore, Harry ghostwrote the 1917 novel Mary Louise Solves a Mystery, which was part of The Bluebird Books series, mimicking his father's style.

In 1944, Harry starred as President Woodrow Wilson in the play The Time to Come produced by the Little Theater of Western Springs. He stated that he considered acting to be only a hobby. He had seen the opening production of The Wizard of Oz, which had been written by his father. Baum also served as the host of a number of annual meetings held by The International Wizard of Oz Club. At the 1964 convention, he awarded a gold plaque, the annual club's annual Oz award, to its founder Justin Schiller who had established the club when he was thirteen years old.

Baum married Mary Niles in 1910. In 1942, he married Brenda Holter, a pianist and composer who served as the president of Chicago's Musicians Club of Women.

Baum retired to Bass Lake, Indiana, at which he managed the Wizard of Oz lodge. Upon his death, on June 7, 1967, he was survived by his wife, Brenda. He was also survived by sons Richard and Henry and daughters Ann and Judith, as well as 11 grandchildren.
