= Genevieve Rogers =

American actress

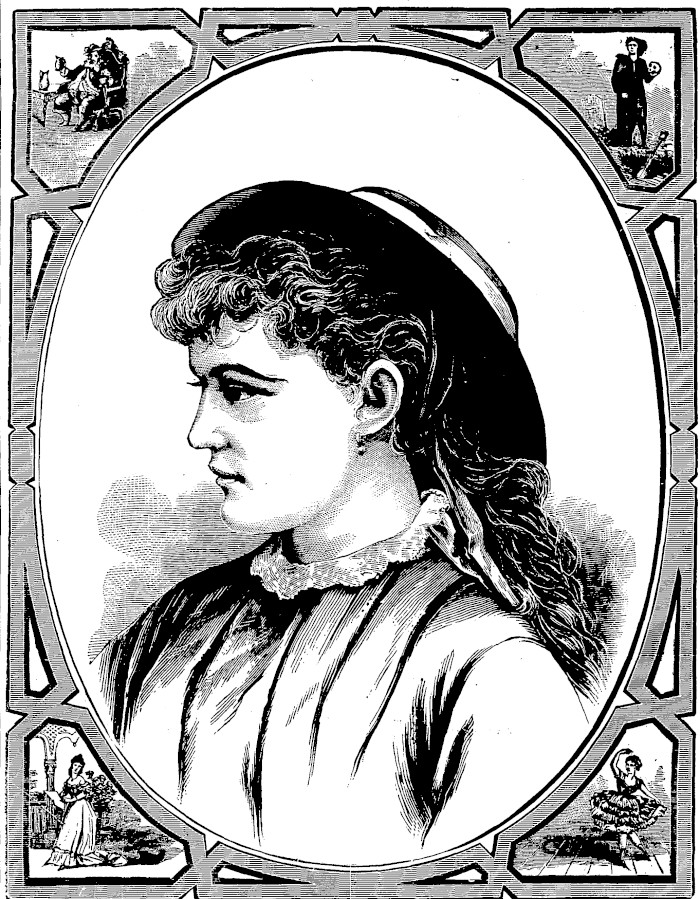
- Sketch of Genevieve Rogers in 1877-08-25 issue of the New York Clipper
- Born: Genevieve Rogers; April 9, 1859; Louisville, Kentucky
- Died: October 30, 1889; Chicago, Illinois

Genevieve Rogers (9 Apr 1859–30 Oct 1889) was a stage actress who began her career when she was four years old. Her father, J. Howard Rogers, was a well-known scenic artist of the time, and her mother also held a prominent position in theatre before her retirement.

== Early life and career ==
Born in Louisville, Kentucky on April 9, 1859, her first appearance on the stage was in The Enchantress at the Howard Athenaeum in Boston, Massachusetts, a grand operatic drama where she played the role of a child, working alongside Miss Caroline Richings. She continued acting at the Howard Athenaeum, playing the roles of different child characters, until 1868, when she was granted the role of little Arthur Leigh in Rosedale and performed at the Boston Museum. Throughout the same season, she played as Puck in A Midsummer Night's Dream in a long run at the Continental Theatre, along with getting her education at the Dudley School, where, according to her teachers, she did very well.

In 1869, she moved with her parents to Chicago, Illinois, and completed her education.

In April 1875, she returned once again to the stage, though this time under the management of Frank E. Aiken, one of the leading stage managers of Chicago for several years. Mr. Aiken's reputation allowed her access to the theatres of other managers around the United States.

From 1875 to 1876, she portrayed a wide range of characters, some of the most prominent being Kate Calvert in The Virginian, Juliana in The Honeymoon, Parthenia in Ingomar, Peg Woffington in Masks and Faces, Hester Arncliffe in An Unequal Match, and Grace Holden in Grace Holden's Secret.

In September 1876, she played the title character in Maud Muller (based on the poem of the same name), and with that role, continued to act in all the major cities in the country.

In March 1877, she returned to her first venue, the Boston Museum, and played there for the first time since her early childhood.

Under a five-year contract with Frank E. Aiken from April 1875, she proceeded to strengthen her repertoire.

Rogers died from "congestion of the brain" on October 30, 1889, in Chicago, Illinois. She was 30 years old.
