= Sally Roesch Wagner =

American author and activist (1942–2025)

Sally Roesch Wagner (July 11, 1942 – June 11, 2025) was an American author, activist, biographer, educator, lecturer and historian. Wagner is known for her work in multiple activist movements, publications and programs, as well as her lectures on history and activism. Wagner is known as a biographer of Matilda Joslyn Gage, a 19th century suffragist who was credited with describing a phenomenon known today as the Matilda effect. She was a participant in several early Women's Studies programs.

== Background ==
Wagner was born in Aberdeen, South Dakota on July 11, 1942, to her father, Fred Roesch a banker and son of a German Russian immigrant, and her mother, Lorraine (Aldrich) Roesch. Wagner has described her mother as a "beautiful, creative woman who was locked into the impossibility of actualizing herself in the 1950's." In 1960, Wagner became pregnant out of high school and had no access to birth control or abortion, a fact that impacted her later activism with the Women's liberation movement. She got married immediately after that at the age of 18, and gave birth to her first child later that year. She and her husband divorced in 1965, and she raised two children on welfare while earning her degree.

Wagner earned a bachelor's degree in Psychology and a masters degree from California State University, Sacramento before going on to be one of the first people in the United States to earn a doctorate degree from the interdisciplinary History of Consciousness Program with a concentration in Women's Studies from the University of California, Santa Cruz in 1975.

In 1992, Wagner received the Humanist Heroine Award from the American Humanist Association.

Wagner died on June 11, 2025, at the age of 82.

== Career and activism ==
The beginning of Wagner's activism began after she saw footage of a North Vietnamese mother with her napalmed baby. From there, she joined Another Mother For Peace, an anti-war not-for-profit organization and became a strong member of the anti-war movement, becoming involved with university strikes in protest of the Vietnam War and Kent State shootings. She also advocated strongly for women's liberation and held a strong position in the movement.

After that, she went back to teach at her alma mater, California State University, Sacramento. There, she helped found the school's Women Studies Program and taught from the 1970s to 1981 before resigning and being hired at Mankato State University in Minnesota and teaching there from 1981 to 1985.

Through her affiliation with Mankato State University, Wagner won a fellowship to study suffragist Matilda Joslyn Gage from the National Endowment for the Humanities Fellowship. The product of that fellowship was A Time of Protest: Suffragists Challenge the Republic, 1870-1887. From there, she became extremely interested in Gage and eventually purchased the home Gage lived in until 1898, located in Fayetteville, New York. In 2002, she turned it into the Matilda Joslyn Gage Center.

Wagner began work as a Distinguished Visiting Professor at Syracuse University in 1997, teaching classes on women's suffrage and other activist history. In 2019, she published The Women's Suffrage Movement, an anthology of works about the history of women's suffrage. In this book, she discusses the political power that Indigenous women hold, the beginning of the suffrage movement, the downfalls of the Comstock Act of 1873, and much more.

In 2020, the documentary Without a Whisper: Konnón:kwe premiered, featuring Wagner and Mohawk Clan Mother Louise Herne. The documentary discusses how Indigenous women influenced the early suffragists.

=== Campaigns against The Wounded Knee Massacre ===
Wagner became interested in Wounded Knee, specifically the Wounded Knee Massacre, while she was researching Daughters of Dakota, a book series about pioneer women. She has researched and brought to light the various ways that the massacre was covered up, saying that she believed that there was a military cover-up of what happened. She has called for a revocation of the medals awarded to the American soldiers who attacked at Wounded Knee for decades.

=== L. Frank Baum racism ===
Wagner also was one of the pioneers in bringing to light the racist and genocidal messages that L. Frank Baum, the author of The Wonderful Wizard of Oz, who wrote in support of the genocide of the Native Americans in Wounded Knee, calling for a "total extermination." Many believe that the publication of his beliefs could have led to the Wounded Knee massacre. Baum's estate apologized for his racism in 2006.

== Publications ==
Publication	Appeared In	Publisher	Year Published
"The Influence of the Haudenosaunee"	A Vote for Women: Celebrating the Women's Suffrage Movement and the 19th Amendment.	London: SJH Group	2021
Law and Altar: The Timely and Timeless Struggle of Matilda Joslyn Gage	Conscience: The Newsjournal of Catholic Opinion, Vol.XLII	Conscience: The Newsjournal of Catholic Opinion	2021
Honoring the Circle: Ongoing Learning of the West from American Indians on Politics and Society		Vol. II. Waterside Productions	2020
We Want Equal Rights: How Suffragists Were Influence by Native American Women		7th Generation	2020
"Family Legacy," book review of Princess of the Hither Isles: A Black Suffragist's Story from the Jim Crow South		Ms. Magazine	2019
The Influence of the Haudenosaunee (Iroquois)	Women Win the Vote, National Women's History Alliance	National Women's History Alliance	2019
Truth, Reconciliation and Reshaping Women's History		Ms. Online	2019
The Women's Suffrage Movement		Penguin Classics	2019
Introduction	Roses and Radicals	Viking Books For Young Readers	2017
"'Suffragette' is the movie feminists have been dreaming of"	USA Today, November 2015	USA Today	2015
"I'll Have What She's Having"	Bust Magazine, Volume 95	Bust Magazine	2015
The Elizabeth Cady Stanton Collection		Syracuse Cultural Workers	2015
"Safe Containers for Dangerous Memories"	The Public Historian, Volume 37	The Public Historian	2015
Productive Discomfort: Dialogue, Reproductive Choice and Social Justice Education at the Matilda Joslyn Gage Center	Journal of Museum Education, Volume 38, Number 2, Summer 2013.	Journal of Museum Education	2013
The moment has come for women's equality in New York: Commentary.	The [Syracuse] Post Standard online (Syracuse.com), 18 June 2013.	The Syracuse Post Standard, online	2013
Film is Antithesis of Author Baum's Egalitarian, Matriarchal Vision	The [Syracuse] Post Standard, 17 March 2013	The [Syracuse] Post Standard	2013
Matilda Joslyn Gage: Far Ahead of Her Time	Syracuse Woman Magazine, March 2013	Syracuse Woman Magazine	2013
The Susan B. Anthony Window in the Home of Matilda Joslyn Gage	New York History Review. Volume 6, Issue 1, December 2012	New York History Review	2012
Come Write On Our Walls!	Museums of Ideas: Commitment and Conflict	Museums Etc, Ltd.	2011
Feminism, Native American Influences,	Encyclopedia of American Indian History, Vol. II.	ABC: CLIO	2008
Matilda Joslyn Gage	The New Encyclopedia of Unbelief	Prometheus Books	2007
Haudenosaunee Women Inspire	Peace Newsletter	Syracuse NY Peace Council	2006
As Cady Did. Book Review.	Ms. Magazine, Fall 2005	Ms. Magazine	2005
The Indigenous Roots of United States Feminism	Feminist Politics, Activism and Vision: Local and Global Challenge.	London and New York: Zed Books Ltd.	2004
The Wonderful Mother of Oz	Baum Bugle, Winter 2003	Baum Bugle	2003
American Women	YES! A Journal of Positive Futures, Spring 2002.	YES!	2002
"Forgotten Champion of Liberty: Matilda Joslyn Gage (19th Century Suffrage Leader)"	Free Inquiry Fall 2002	Free Inquiry	2002
Woman, Church and State. Introduction to reprint of Matilda Joslyn Gage's 1893 classic.		Prometheus Books	2001
Sisters in Spirit: The Haudenosaunee (Iroquois) Influence on Woman's Rights		Native Voices Press	2001
"New Women's History Videos."	National Women's Studies Association Journal	Indiana University Press	2000
"The Iroquois Influence on Women's Rights"	Awakened Woman E-Magazine, Winter Solstice 1999	Awakened Woman Magazine	1999
Faculty Guide to accompany film "Not For Ourselves Alone: The Story of Elizabeth Cady Stanton and Susan B. Anthony,"		Public Broadcasting System	1999
Matilda Joslyn Gage: She Who Holds the Sky		Sky Carrier Press	1998
A Time of Protest: Suffragists Challenge the Republic		Sky Carrier Press	1997
Daughters of Dakota Series		Sky Carrier Press	1989–1993
Stories from the Black Hills	Volume Six		1993
The Long Stories.	Volume Five		1992
Stories of Privation: German, German-Russian and Scandinavian Immigrants in South Dakota	Volume 4		1991
Stories of Friendship Between Settlers and the Dakota Indians	Volume 3		1990
Stories from the Attic	Volume 2		1990
