= Life Photo Film Corporation =

American silent film production company

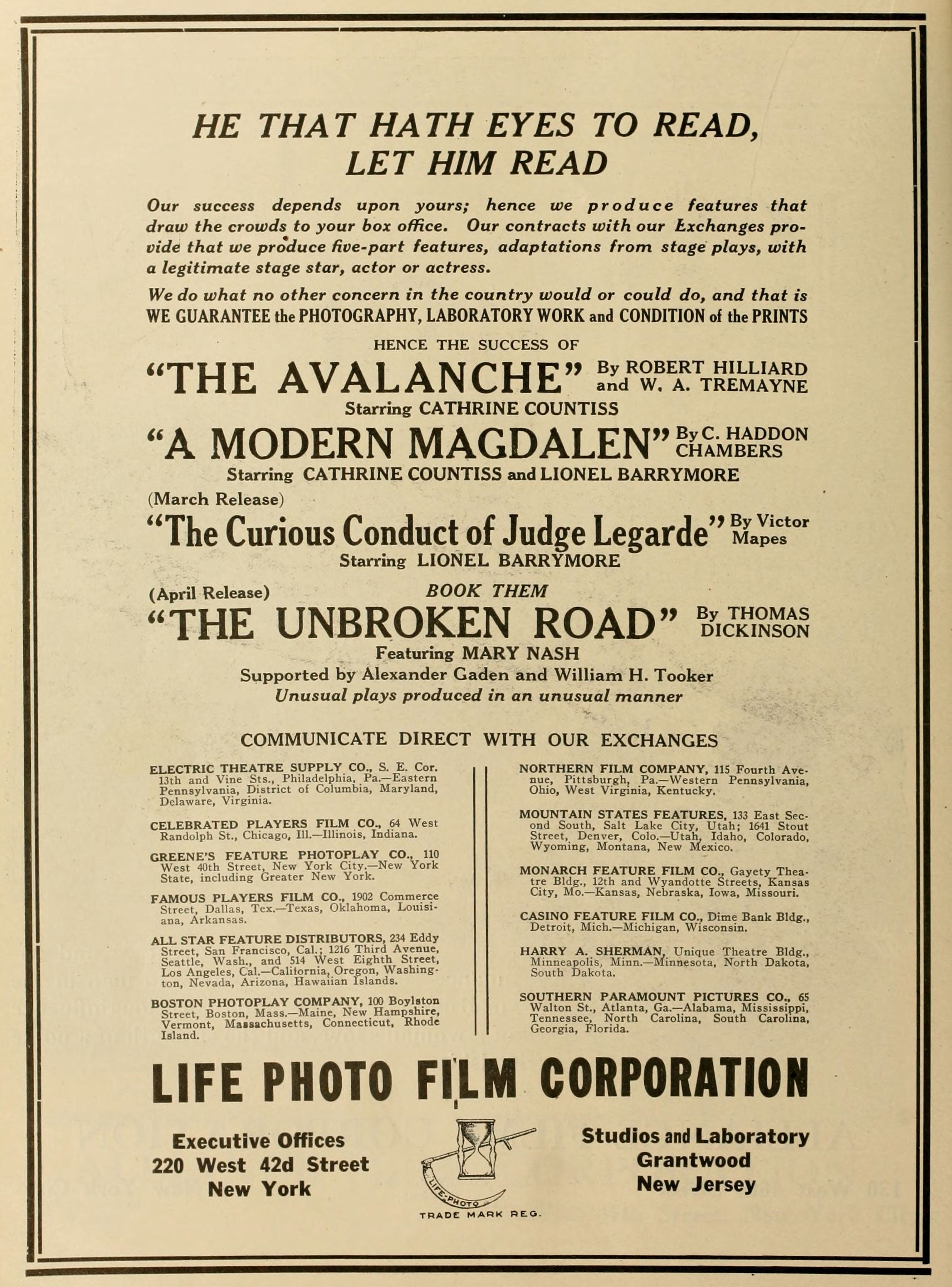

Life Photo Film Corporation was a film production company in the United States. It made films in 1914 and 1915. The company built a film studio and laboratory in Grantwood, New Jersey. It adapted stage plays and advertised itself as "The House of Broadway Features". Jesse J. Goldburg was general manager. He was also described as secretary of the corporation, whose other officers were Edward M. Roskam, president; Leonard Abrahams, vice-president; Bernard Lowenthal, treasurer.

The company was originally in New York City at 102 West 101st Street. The executive offices were in the Candler Building in New York City.

The company reorganized at its first annual meeting and sought to recover from an eviction of its offices by order of a fire marshal as well as censor objections to its film The Ordeal. It sought to increase production and secure a release deal or adopt a states rights release program.

== Filmography ==
- Captain Swift (1914)
- Northern Lights (1914)
- The Greyhound (1914)
- The Ordeal (1914)
- The Banker's Daughter (1914)
- Springtime (1914)
- A Modern Magdalen (1915)
- The Battle of Innocence (1915)
- The Amazing Mr. Fellman (1915)
- The Curious Conduct of Judge Legarde (1915)
- The Unbroken Road (1915)
- The Avalanche (1915)
- The Unbroken Road (1915) starring Mary Nash
