= Christopher Pettiet =

American actor (1976–2000)

- Born: Christopher Lee Pettiet; February 12, 1976; Plano, Texas, U.S.
- Died: April 12, 2000 (aged 24); Los Angeles, California, U.S.
- Occupation: Actor
- Years active: 1990–1999

Christopher Lee Pettiet (February 12, 1976 – April 12, 2000) was an American actor best known for his role as Jesse James in the Western TV series The Young Riders and as Zach Crandell in the cult comedy film Don't Tell Mom the Babysitter's Dead (1991).

== Career ==
Pettiet began his career as a child actor making appearances in television series such as Star Trek: The Next Generation, L.A. Law, Empty Nest, and Doogie Howser, M.D.. He played the middle brother in the 1991 comedy film Don't Tell Mom the Babysitter's Dead. Also in 1991, Pettiet appeared in the hit film Point Break alongside actors Patrick Swayze and Keanu Reeves, and in the same year joined the final season of The Young Riders as a teenage version of Jesse James.

Pettiet would star in other popular TV shows such as Baywatch in 1992, the science fiction TV series seaQuest DSV in 1993, and on the TV series Picket Fences in 1994. He would also star on the TV show Touched By An Angel in 1995 and Chicago Hope in 1998. Pettiet starred in independent films like Danger Island (1992), The Sandman (1992), The Goodbye Bird (1993), Relentless IV: Ashes to Ashes (1993) and Horses and Champions (1994).

Most of his subsequent career was in episodic television and independent films, including Boys and Carried Away, both released in 1996. He had a brief recurring role on the first season of MTV's Undressed. Pettiet's last appearance was in a 1999 episode of Judging Amy.

== Death ==
Pettiet died of an accidental drug overdose on April 12, 2000, in Los Angeles, California, at the age of 24. His autopsy report listed that the probable combined effect of cocaine, dextropropoxyphene, and diazepam had caused his death. His autopsy also attributed his death to "probable cardiomyopathy" but it was only a contributing condition and not an immediate cause. Pettiet was cremated; his ashes were scattered at sea off of Topanga Canyon Road in Santa Monica, California. After his death, his acting coach, Kevin McDermott, founded a scholarship fund in his name to help young actors to attend Center Stage LA where he had trained.

== Filmography ==
=== Film ===
Year	Title	Role	Notes
1990	The Dreamer of Oz	Teenage L Frank Baum	
1991	Don't Tell Mom the Babysitter's Dead	Zach Crandell	
1991	Point Break	15-Year-Old Kid at Surfboard Shop	
1992	Sandman	Jesse	Short
1993	The Goodbye Bird	Francis 'Frank' Phillips	
1994	Horses and Champions	Joe	
1994	Relentless IV: Ashes to Ashes	Cory Dietz	
1996	Boys	Jon Heinz	
1996	Carried Away	Robert Henson	
1997	Against the Law	Tommy	

=== Television ===
Year	Title	Role	Notes
1990	An Enemy of the People	Morton Stockman	Television film
1990	Star Trek: The Next Generation	Boy	Episode: "The High Ground"
1990	Doogie Howser, M.D	Gregory Pelzman	Episode: "Revenge of the Teenage Dead"
1990	The Dreamer of Oz	Frank Jr. (Teenage)	Television film
1991	Fatal Exposure	Drew	Television film
1991	L.A. Law	Corey Walker	Episode: "On the Toad Again"
1991	Empty Nest	Harry 'Little Harry'	Episode: "The Way We Are"
1991	My Life and Times	Michael Miller	Episode: "The Collapse of '98"
1991–1992	The Young Riders	Jesse James	21 episodes
1992	Danger Island	Brian	Television film
1992	Baywatch	'Beaver'	Episode: "Tequila Bay"
1993	seaQuest DSV	Zachery Thomas	Episode: "Brothers and Sisters"
1995	Picket Fences	Michael Hynes	Episode: "The Song of Rome"
1997	Touched by an Angel	Luke Brewer	Episode: "Crisis of Faith"
1998	Chicago Hope	Kevin Dicker	Episode: "Viagra-Vated Assault"
1999	Undressed	Dean	6 episodes
1999	Judging Amy	Paul Dexter	Episode: "Impartial Bias"

== Accolades ==
Year	Award	Category	Title of work	Result	Ref.
1991	Young Artist Award	Best Young Actor Guest Starring in a Television Series	Doogie Howser, M.D.	Won	
1992	Young Artist Award	Outstanding Young Ensemble Cast in a Motion Picture	Don't Tell Mom the Babysitter's Dead (Shared with cast)	Nominated	
1992	Young Artist Award	Best Young Actor Co-starring in a Television Series	The Young Riders	Nominated	
