= Frank Kramer =

Frank Kramer may refer to:

- Frank Louis Kramer (1880–1958), American cyclist
- Frank Kramer (artist) (1905–1993), American artist and illustrator
- Frank Kramer (footballer, born 1947) (1949–2020), Dutch footballer and television presenter for SC Telstar
- Frank Kramer (footballer, born 1972), German football player and coach
- Gianfranco Parolini or Frank Kramer (1925–2018), Italian film director
