= Kevin Royal Johnson =

- Born: November 21, 1961 (age 64); Fayetteville, Arkansas; United States
- Occupations: Author, antiquarian bookseller, musician
- Writing career
- Years active: 1987–present

Kevin Royal Johnson (born November 21, 1961) is an American author and singer-songwriter living in Baltimore, Maryland. He is the founding member of the band The Linemen.

== Early life ==
Johnson was raised and educated in Van Buren, Arkansas until the age of 10, when he moved to Little Rock where he lived until the age of 18. He attended Little Rock Central High School and then moved to Nashville, to attend Vanderbilt University, where he graduated with a degree in electrical engineering in 1984.

== Career ==
=== Author ===
Johnson is the author of three books, The Celluloid Paper Trail: Identification and Description of Twentieth Century Film Scripts, The Dark Page: Books That Inspired American Film Noir 1940–1949 and The Dark Page II: Books That Inspired American Film Noir 1950–1965. All three books were published by the Oak Knoll Press.

Johnson has taught on the subject of film script identification at Yale University, UCLA, the Academy of Motion Picture Arts and Sciences, and Rare Book School at the University of Virginia.

=== Antiquarian bookseller ===
Johnson founded Royal Books, Inc. in Baltimore, Maryland in 1998. He has been a member of the Antiquarian Booksellers' Association of America since 2002 and between 2007 and 2013 was on the faculty (and subsequently the director of) the Colorado Antiquarian Book Seminar.

=== Musical career ===
Johnson began playing music as a solo performer while at Vanderbilt, and in 1984 moved to the Washington, DC area, where he played the pub circuit, most notably with singer-songwriter Mary Chapin Carpenter. He formed his first band The Revellaires in 1987, releasing one record entitled Pop of Ages.

In 1991 he formed The Linemen with Eric Brace, Antoine Sanfuentes, and Bill Williams. Between 1991 and 2001 the band released four records under Johnson's own SAM Records label, with new members Tony Flagg (bass) and Scott McKnight (guitar) replacing Brace and Williams in 1994, and adding James Key (mandolin) and Dave Giegerich (dobro, steel guitar).

Johnson's first album with the Linemen, Memphis for Breakfast, was recorded at Ardent Studios in Memphis, Tennessee, and produced by John Alagía. Johnson's second album, The Rest of Your Life, was also produced by Alagía and designed by Jeff Nelson. Johnson's third album with the Linemen, Parole Music, was produced by Charlie Chesterman.

In 2012, The Linemen reformed, adding Jonathan Gregg as a second lead vocalist, lead guitarist, and pedal steel guitarist, and with band alumni Scott McKnight (bass), Bill Williams (guitar, slide guitar, mandolin), and Antoine Sanfuentes (drums). In the fall of 2016 they released their first album, Close the Place Down, recorded by Andrew Taub at Brooklyn Recording and worked once again with John Alagia.

Johnson has performed (both solo and with the Linemen) on NPR's Mountain Stage as well as CBGB, 9:30 Club, the Modell Performing Arts Center, and The Birchmere.

== Critical reception ==
The Dark Page: Books That Inspired American Film Noir 1940–1949 was reviewed positively in Film Comment magazine, and given 7/10 stars by PopMatters. The first volume was blurbed by Los Angeles Times film critic Kenneth Turan, who described the book as having "compelling reproductions of first edition jackets alternating with pithy, knowledgeable text about both the books and the films." Dave Heating from Erasing Cloud wrote that "it's one of those books that reminds you of the magic of books themselves," and Laura Rattray of University of Chicago Press' journal The Papers of the Bibliographical Society of America called the book "a visual feast."

Film critic Leonard Maltin wrote that The Dark Page II: Books That Inspired American Film Noir 1950–1965 "has much to offer, both as a reference and as a source of sheer pleasure."

== Bibliography ==
- Johnson, Kevin (2008). The Dark Page: Books that Inspired American Film Noir (1940-1949). Oak Knoll Press. ISBN 9781584562177. OCLC 244223210.
- Johnson, Kevin; Gregory, Dan (2009). The Dark Page: Books that Inspired American Film Noir (1950-1965). Oak Knoll Press. ISBN 9781584562597. OCLC 836965209.
- Johnson, Kevin R (2019). Celluloid Paper Trail. Oak Knoll. ISBN 9781584563792. OCLC 1104409340.

== Discography ==
=== The Revellaires ===
- Pop of Ages (1987), Top Records

=== Kevin Johnson and the Linemen ===
- Memphis for Breakfast (1991), SAM Records
- The Rest of Your Life (1994), SAM Records
- Parole Music (1997), SAM Records
- Sunday Driver (2000), SAM Records
- Various Artists Americana Motel (2001) – compilation on Bay Gumbo Music

=== The Linemen ===
- Close the Place Down (2016), SAM Records
