= Justin G. Schiller =

American bookseller

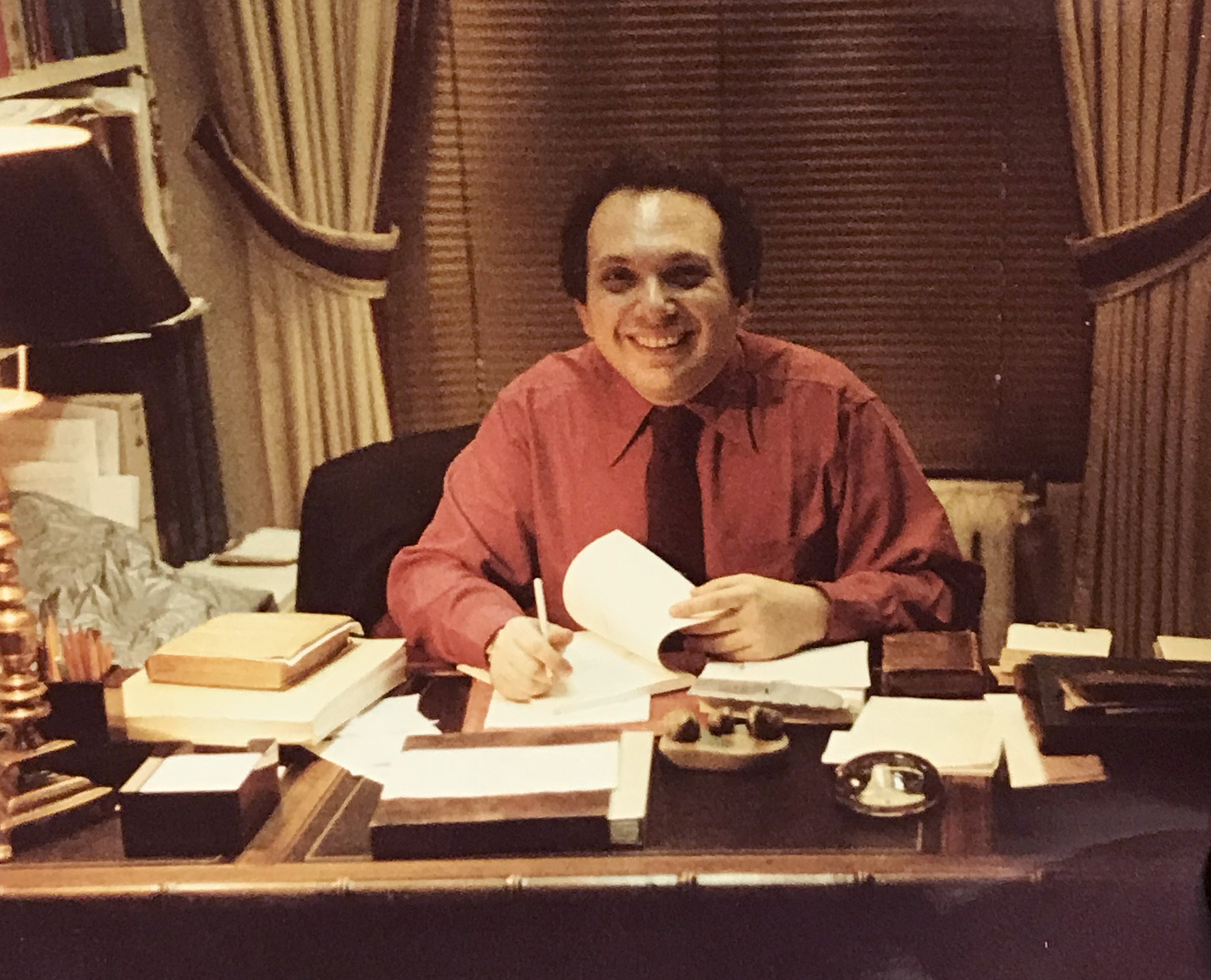
- Born: September 10, 1943 (age 83); Brooklyn, New York, U.S.
- Education: Ithaca College (1961–65); Harpur College; SUNY Binghamton (1965–66)
- Occupations: Bookseller, Justin G Schiller Ltd; Battledore Ltd
- Known for: Antiquarian children's books and related art; writer, lecturer, and collector

Justin Galland Schiller (born September 10, 1943) is an American bookseller specializing in rare and collectible children's books; proprietor during his student days under his own name (1960–69), then Justin G. Schiller, Ltd. (1969–2020). Headquartered in New York City, it was the oldest specialist firm in the United States, focusing on historical and collectible children's books, related original art, and manuscripts. In 1988, he formed a second corporation—Battledore Ltd, with his partner and spouse Dennis M V David, to further specialize in original children's book illustration art and the legacy of Maurice Sendak.

== Early life ==
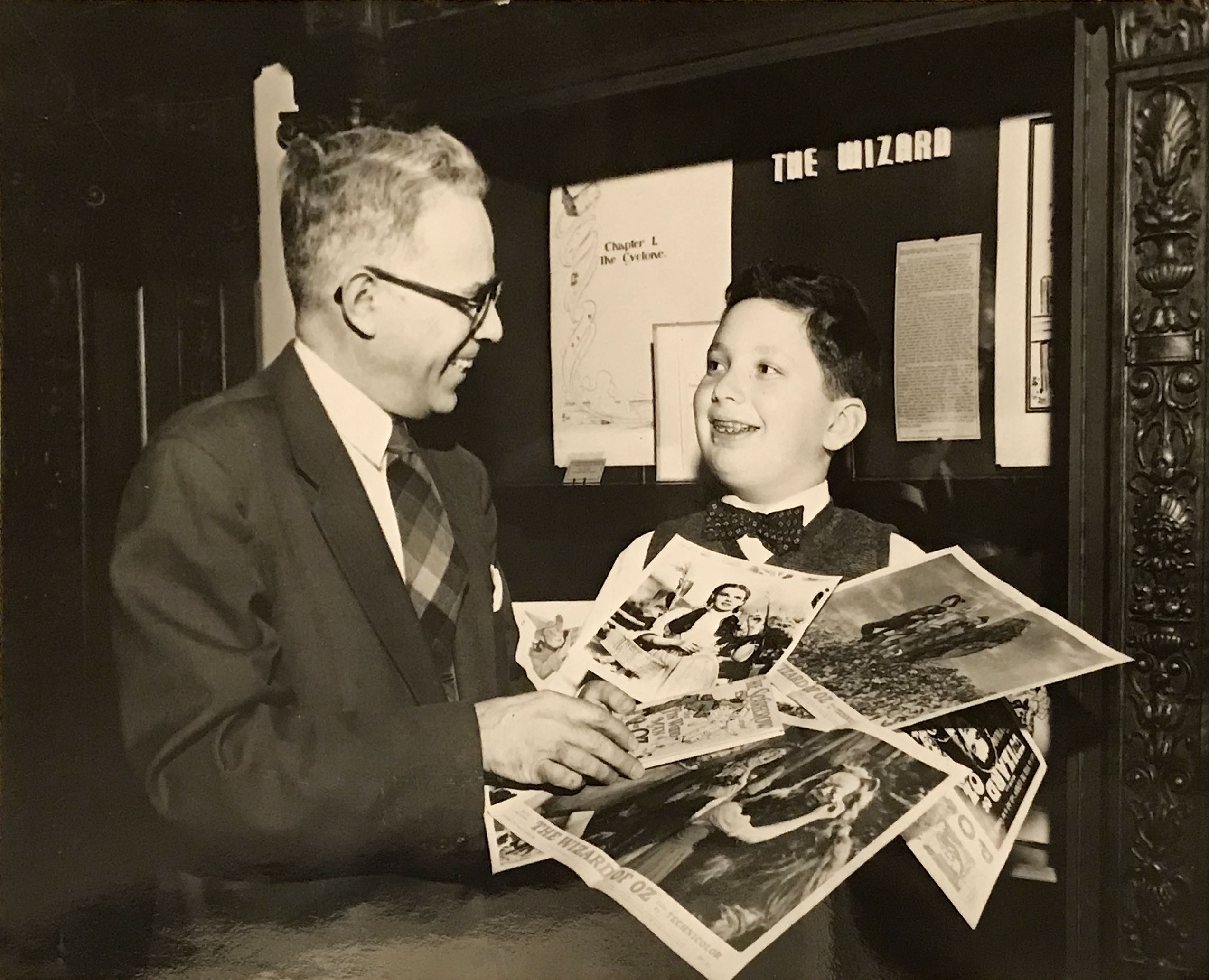
A thirteen-year-old Schiller (right) at Columbia University in 1956 for the centennial exhibition of L. Frank Baum.

Justin Galland Schiller was born in Brooklyn, New York, on September 10, 1943, to Samuel Gary Schiller and Constance Audrey Galland where he attended Public School 236 and Samuel J Tilden High School. As an eight-year-old boy he started collecting Wizard of Oz books by L. Frank Baum, lending parts of his collection to the author's centennial exhibition at Columbia University's Butler Library in 1956. At age of 13, Schiller founded the Wizard of Oz Fan Club, afterwards renamed The International Wizard of Oz Club, appointing Frank Joslyn Baum its honorary president.

On the November 3, 1956, television debut of the MGM Wizard of Oz film, host Bert Lahr appeared with 10-year old Liza Minnelli and 13 year-old Schiller, introducing the movie by reading from Schiller's copy of The Wonderful Wizard of Oz first edition (1900).

And as an expert in all things Ozian, Justin appeared in an early episode of the television game show To Tell The Truth (1972) where guest celebrities had to identify him amidst two impostors.

== Career ==
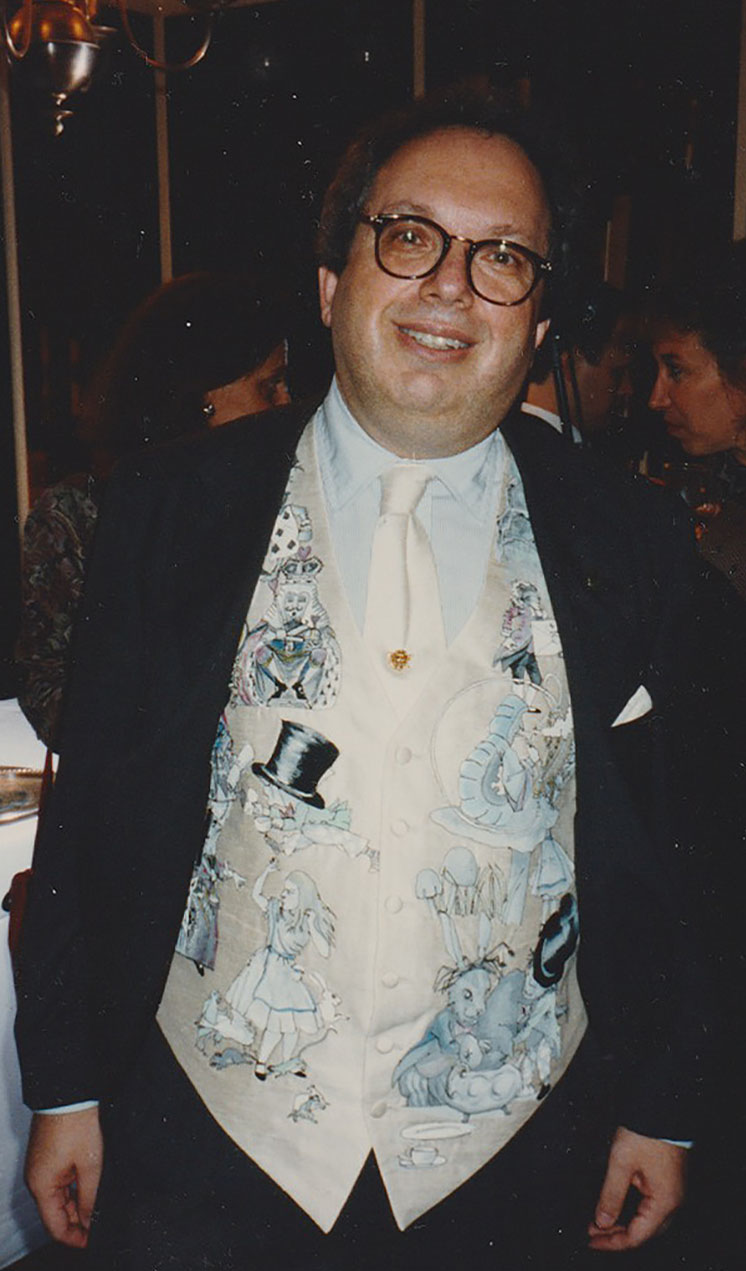
At the Grolier Club in New York City, 1993.

Schiller received a Bachelor of Arts from Ithaca College in 1965 (Honors in English Renaissance Literature). He attended the International Symposium at the Shakespeare Institute at Birmingham University in 1964, and completed a graduate studies/teaching fellowship at Harpur College, SUNY Binghamton, in 1966.

Schiller's first antiquarian books catalogue was issued in 1960; he was elected to the Antiquarian Booksellers Association of America in February 1967 (member of the Board of Governors, Class of 1976), where he remains a member. His first specialty catalogue on collectible children's books came out that year. He was also a member of the Antiquarian Booksellers Association (UK) from 1969 to 1989, and joined the Bibliographical Society of America in 1969, where he's still a member (Council, 2001–2007). He served as chairman on the Antiquarian Booksellers Center board of directors from 1973 to 1976; he has been a member of the Grolier Club since 1982. Schiller was a member of the Association Internationale de Bibliophilie from 1983 to 2012; and the American Antiquarian Society since 1984. He served on the Lenox Society Steering Committee for Rare Books & Manuscripts at the New York Public Library from 1986 to 2000, and the Lewis Carroll Foundation board of directors from 1988 to 1995.

Schiller works to promote awareness in early children's books, writing articles on various authors, artists, genres and collectibles, including reports and annual analyses of the antiquarian children's book field, and annual auction summaries and book reviews in trade journals including AB Bookman's Weekly, where he contributed from 1971 to 1989.

Schiller has acted as advisor and dealer for some of the major private and institutional collections of early children's books in the world, including the Betsy Beinecke Shirley Collection now at Yale's Beinecke Library, the Lloyd E. Cotsen Collection of Children's Books now at Princeton University's Firestone Library, and the Peter J. Solomon Collection now at the Houghton Library, Harvard University, among others.

His legacy extends to two fellowships with the American Antiquarian Society and the Bibliographical Society of America devoted to promoting scholarship in early children's literature research prior to 1901. The Justin G. Schiller Fellowship at the American Antiquarian Society supports research by both doctoral candidates and postdoctoral scholars from any disciplinary perspective on the production, distribution, literary content, or historical context of American children's books to 1876.

== Collections ==
As an early collector, Schiller formed numerous major collections which resulted in single-owner auctions and exhibitions of what he assembled:

- L Frank Baum and related Oziana, Swann Galleries NY sale 1118 (November 2, 1978)
- Lewis Carroll and Alice, Christie's NY sale 9046, December 9, 1998
- The Treasure of Siam, Christie's Bangkok sale 9991, August 7, 1999
- Dutch Modernism ... Symbolism, Art Nouveau and Art Deco 1880-1930, Sotheby's Amsterdam Sale 1047, February 5, 2008
- Vintage Chinese Posters 1939-1990, Bloomsbury London sale 583, September 21, 2006
- Red China 1921-1976, Bloomsbury sale 35982, London October 4, 2012
- The Art of Maurice Sendak at the Society of Illustrators NY, 2013
- Quotations of Chairman Mao 1964-2014 (The Little Red Book, 50th anniversary), Grolier Club NY 2014
- "Once Upon A Time", the inventory of Justin G Schiller Ltd, Heritage Auctions (Dallas) sale 6234, December 16, 2020
- "Collections of an Only Child: Seventy Years a Bibliophile", Freemans Auctions (New York), 5 December 2023
- Vintage Chinese Propaganda from the Era of Mao, Material Culture Auction (Philadelphia), 8 December 2025

== Publications ==
- "L Frank Baum and his Teen-Age Serials: a Bibliographical Checklist", Boys' Book Collector II:3 (Spring 1971)
- "Collecting Children's Literature", American Book Collector, Summer 1972
- "Memoirs of an Antiquarian Bookseller", Horn Book Magazine, October 1973
- "Artistic Awareness in Early Children's Books", Children's Literature: The Great Excluded, Volume III, 1974 (Temple University Press)
- "Magazines for Young America: the First Hundred Years of Juvenile Periodicals", Columbia Library Columns XXIII:3 (May 1974), Columbia University
- "The Publication of Little Black Sambo", The Book Collector, Summer 1974
- "Collecting American Juveniles" (Chapter 4), in Jack Tannen's How To Identify And Collect American First Editions: A Guide Book (New York: Arco, 1976)
- "Early Children's Books at the Pierpont Morgan Library", American Book Collector, 1976
- "Collecting Historical Children's Books", Art At Auction (Sotheby's), 1976–77
- "Animated Picture Books to 1900", Children's Books International 2, Boston Public Library, 1977
- Classics in Children's Literature, 73 volumes co-edited with Alison Lurie (Garland, 1977)
- "Notes on an Antiquarian Children's Bookshop", Horn Book Magazine, April 1977
- Introductions to Lothar Meggendorfer's mechanical toybooks Doll's House (1978), International Circus (1979), &c, Metropolitan Museum of Art, New York (Intervisual Communications)
- L Frank Baum and related Oziana, The Schiller Collection, Swann Galleries, 1978
- "The Osborne Collection: An Appreciation", A Token for Friends, Toronto Public Library, 1979
- "Appraising Historical Children's Books", AB Bookman's Yearbook 1984
- Introduction for Barry Moser's illustrated version of The Wonderful Wizard of Oz by L Frank Baum, Pennyroyal Press, 1985 (reprinted, University of California Press, 1986)
- Introduction for Youthful Recreations. Dallas TX: The Somesuch Press [Stanley Marcus], 1986
- Nonsense Books bibliography, Edward Lear 1812 - 1886, Royal Academy of Arts, 1985
- Nonsensus: Cross-referencing Edward Lear's original 116 limericks with eight holograph manuscripts and their printed texts, Catalpa Press, 1988
- "Illustrated American Children's Books", A Child's Garden of Dreams, Brandywine River Museum, 1989
- "One Collector's Progress", The Washington Post, Book World XIX:20 (May 14, 1989), pp. 1 + 22
- Alice's Adventures in Wonderland, An 1865 Printing re-described. With a revised and expanded Census of the Suppressed 1865 "Alice" ... to which is added a short-title index identifying and locating the original preliminary drawings by John Tenniel for Alice and Looking-Glass, privately printed 1990
- "Collectible Children's Books: An Introduction", Rare & Collectible Children's Books, Tokyo (Japan): Maruzen Co., 1990
- "Works by Beatrix Potter", The Guennol Collection, Vol III, Brooklyn Museum 1991
- Sendak in Asia. Tokyo exhibition catalogue (1996) featuring original artwork by Maurice Sendak
- "Journeying to the World of Beatrix Potter", Christie's International Magazine (London), April 1997
- "Once Upon A Time, the early years of Charles Perrault's Fairy Tales", Biblio magazine, December 1997. (pp. 28–33)
- "Paul Bunyan, the making of an American Myth", Biblio magazine, March 1998
- "Appraising Collectible Children's Books", Building A Special Collection of Children's Literature in your Library, American Library Assoc. (1998)
- Digging for Treasure: An adventure in appraising rare and collectible children's books. [Bloomington] Friends of the Lilly Library, Indiana University, 1998. Illustrated version of a 1997 lecture
- "Welcome to the Land of Oz", Antiquarian Book Review XXIX:6 (issue 330), July 2002, pp. 32–37
- Pioneering Collectible Children's Books: the First One Hundred Years, the Ninth Sol. M. Malkin Lecture in Bibliography. Charlottesville: Book Arts Press, Univ. of Virginia, September 2002
- "Maurice Sendak All Around", Horn Book Magazine Special Sendak issue, November/December 2003
- "The Tale of Beatrix Potter", Rare Book Review (cover story, pp 14–18), December 2006/January 2007
- "Fifty Years of the Oz Club", The Baum Bugle vol. LI:2 (pp. 7–9), Autumn 2007
- "A Note on Betsy Beinecke Shirley", Drawn To Enchant (New Haven: Beinecke Rare Books Library, 2007); see also American Antiquarian Society Proceedings: obituary, v.113:2, pp 242–247 (Worcester 2005) and Grolier Club Member memorials in the Gazette of the Grolier Club (issue LXX, 2020, 132–136)
- "Martin Gardner: A Personal Reminiscence" in Bouquet For The Gardener. Lewis Carroll Society N.A., 2011
- Maurice Sendak: A Celebration of the Artist and His Work. Abrams 2013, Society of Illustrators exhibition
- Quotations of Chairman Mao 1964-2014, a Short Bibliographical Study. New York: Grolier Club, 2014
- Radiant with Color and Art: McLoughlin Brothers and the Business of Picture Books, 1858–1920, The Grolier Club
- Sendak and Blake illustrating "Songs of Innocence". Kingston NY: Battledore Ltd, 2018

=== Documentary film and television appearances ===
- The Booksellers (2019)
- Murder Among the Mormons (2021)

== Personal life ==
Schiller currently lives in Kingston, New York, with his spouse Dennis M V David (together since February 1981, married July 27, 2011), in a Victorian house built for George Coykendall (he managed the Kingston city trolley system for the Coykendall family), above the historic district of Rondout.
