= Frank Kramer (artist) =

American artist and illustrator (1905–1993)

Frank Kramer (November 23, 1905 – July 10, 1993) was an American artist known chiefly for his illustrations for Jack Snow's two Oz books, The Magical Mimics in Oz and The Shaggy Man of Oz, founded on and continuing the famous Oz stories by L. Frank Baum. He also illustrated Robert A. Heinlein's Solution Unsatisfactory, Maureen Daly's Twelve Around the World (Dodd, Mead and Company, 1957), and many of Caary Paul Jackson's sports novels for children, including the Bud Baker series.

Other than a short biography (with an incorrect birth date) in Jack Snow's reference work Who's Who in Oz (1954), almost nothing was written about Kramer. Recently, however, the Spring 2011 issue of The Baum Bugle featured articles discussing his life, career, and work.

Snow notes that Kramer was born in New York City and lived in Brooklyn, and was a fan of the Brooklyn Dodgers, living as modestly as a "typical" (Snow's quotation marks) business man. He had indeed been a business man, but gave it up to become a freelance artist. His work appeared in Street & Smith magazines prior to Snow's discovery of his "flair for the imaginative" in his sports drawings that drew Snow to his art, which Snow states is known nationally.

== Personal life ==
In 1938, he married Alice Aichele. They did not have children.

== Books illustrated ==
- "Solution Unsatisfactory" by Robert A. Heinlein (Astounding Science Fiction, 1941)
- The Magical Mimics in Oz by Jack Snow (Reilly & Lee, 1946)
- The Shaggy Man of Oz by Jack Snow (Reilly & Lee, 1949)
- Fullback in the Large Fry League by C(aary) Paul Jackson (Follett Corporation, 1951)
- Twelve Around the World: True Accounts of the Lives and Countries of a Dozen Teenagers by Maureen Daly (Dodd, Mead and Company, 1957) (with Frank Daly)
- Bud Baker, T Quarterback by C. Paul Jackson (Hastings House, 1960)
- Bullpen Bargain by C. Paul Jackson (Hastings House, 1961)
- Pro Hockey Comeback by C. Paul Jackson (Hastings House, 1961)
- The Ironclads by Frank Robert Donovan (A Wonderful World Book. A.S. Barnes and Company, 1961)
- Great Suspense Stories compiled by Rosamund Morris, (Hart Publishing, 1962)
- Pro Football Rookie by C. Paul Jackson (Hastings House, 1962)
- Bud Baker, Racing Swimmer by C. Paul Jackson (Hastings House, 1962)
- Little Major Leaguer by C. Paul Jackson (Hastings House, 1963)
- Chris Plays Small Fry Football by C. Paul Jackson (Hastings House, 1964)
- Bud Plays Senior High Basketball by C. Paul Jackson (Hastings House, 1964)
- Pee Wee Cook of the Midget League by C. Paul Jackson (Hastings House, 1964)
- Junior High Freestyle Swimmer by C. Paul Jackson (Hastings House, 1965)
- Minor League Shorstop by C. Paul Jackson (Hastings House, 1965)
- Bud Baker, High School Pitcher by C. Paul Jackson (Hastings House, 1967)
- Hall of Fame Flankerback by C. Paul Jackson (Hastings House, 1968)
- Big Play in the Small League by C. Paul Jackson (Hastings House, 1968)
- Pennant Stretch Drive by C. Paul Jackson (Hastings House, 1969)
- Stepladder Steve Plays Basketball by C. Paul Jackson (Hastings House, 1969)
- Bud Baker, College Pitcher by C. Paul Jackson (Hastings House, 1970)
- Tim, the Football Nut by C. Paul Jackson (Hastings House, 1972)
- Physical Feats That Made History by Harold H. Hart (Hart Publishing, 1974)
- Rocket to Limbo by Alan E. Nourse, (David Mckay company) (fourth printing 1965)

== Magazine work ==
- ADVENTURE: Vol. 112, No. 5 (Popular Publications, May 1946)
- ADVENTURE: Vol. 112, No. 5 (Popular Publications, December 1947)
- Astounding Science Fiction: May 1941, Vol. 27, No. 3 (illustrations for the novella Solution Unsatisfactory by Anson MacDonald, pseudonym for Robert A. Heinlein)
- Astounding Science Fiction: December 1941, Vol. 27, No. 10 (illustrations for the novella Defense Line by Vic Phillips)
