= The Magical Mimics in Oz =

1946 book by Jack Snow

- First edition cover of The Magical Mimics in Oz
- Author: Jack Snow
- Illustrator: Frank Kramer
- Language: English
- Series: The Oz Books
- Genre: Fantasy
- Publisher: Reilly & Lee
- Publication date: 1946
- Publication place: United States
- Media type: print (hardcover)
- Preceded by: Lucky Bucky in Oz
- Followed by: The Shaggy Man of Oz

The Magical Mimics in Oz (1946) is the thirty-seventh book in the Oz series created by L. Frank Baum and his successors, and the first written by Jack Snow. It was illustrated by Frank G. Kramer. The novel was followed by The Shaggy Man of Oz (1949). The novel entered the public domain in the United States, when its copyright was not renewed as required.

== Plot ==
Princess Ozma and Glinda the Good are planning to leave Oz, to attend the Grand Council of the fairy queen Lurline, held in the Forest of Burzee every 200 years. Dorothy Gale is surprised when Ozma appoints her to rule Oz during their absence; but Ozma reminds Dorothy that she is a princess of Oz.

Chapter 3 shifts attention to the evil Mimics in their lair in Mount Illuso. The Mimics habitually shift "from one loathsome shape to another" — an ape body with a head of an alligator, and a serpent with black butterfly wings, and a toad with a hyena's head are a few of their choices. Their rulers, King Umb and Queen Ra (a play on "umbra"), reveal their plan to counter Lurline's controlling magic and attack Oz. The shape-shifting royals and their minions fly to Oz as big black birds, and waylay Dorothy and the Wizard of Oz. By stepping into their shadows, Ra and Umb take the shapes of Dorothy and the Wizard; the originals are paralyzed by the magic, and are carried off to Mount Illuso by Mimics. Ra and Umb, in their stolen forms, search Ozma's library for the antidote to Lurline's magic spell.

Umb and Ra are not capable of imitating the Wizard and Dorothy convincingly; people become suspicious, and Toto exposes them — but not before the Mimic royals find what they are looking for. Back in Mount Illuso, they conjure a gigantic red spider that spins a magic web; this negates the influence of Lurline's spell, and allows the Mimics to launch a mass attack against Oz.

Dorothy and the Wizard are imprisoned in a cave deep within Mount Illuso. There, however, they see a blaze of brilliant fairy light that restores their power of motion. The light stems from a button on the cave wall. They press the button, and a hidden door opens to expose an elevator and its attendant. Hi-Lo, a living wooden puppet, takes them to the top of the mountain. There, the two Ozites discover Pineville and are led to the fairy Ozana, who had been delegated by Lurline to watch over the malicious Mimics. Ozana has spent her lonely days and years creating her Story Blossom Garden and her wooden puppet people (one of whom has escaped to the outer world, to become Charlie McCarthy). Ozana is shocked to discover that the Mimics have evaded her guardianship; she leads Dorothy and the Wizard back to Oz.

The attacking Mimics arrive in Oz disguised as beautiful birds, with gorgeous plumage of "Red, blue, green and gold...." The residents are seduced by their beauty, and the Mimics quickly duplicate and paralyze them. The trick works only on humans; fierce beasts like the Cowardly Lion and Hungry Tiger are magically sedated, while the Scarecrow, the Patchwork Girl and other non-human creatures are simply tied up.

The Mimics have largely accomplished their ends when they confront the simultaneous arrivals of Ozma and Glinda, and Ozana, Dorothy, and the Wizard. Ozana's magic is powerful enough to subdue Ra and Umb and reverse their spells. The Mimics, back in their grotesque forms, are herded into the mirrored grand ballroom of Ozma's palace; good magic imprisons them in the ballroom's many mirrors, from where they are sent back to the interior of Mount Illuso. Order is restored to Oz, and celebrated with the usual concluding banquet. Ozana is rewarded with an invitation to live in Oz; her Pineville people and her Story Blossom Garden are magically transported to Oz so that she will not miss them.

== Development ==
=== A new "Royal Historian" ===
Jack Snow was the fourth official chronicler or "Royal Historian" of Oz, after Baum himself, Ruth Plumly Thompson, and long-time Oz illustrator John R. Neill. Snow made a conscious attempt to return to Baum's inspiration for Oz; in both of the Oz books he wrote, The Magical Mimics and The Shaggy Man of Oz (1949), he deliberately avoided using any characters introduced by Thompson or Neill. Snow crammed Magical Mimics with Baum's characters, sometimes presented in long rosters. Little room was left for original characters; Snow's main creations were his Mimic villains, plus the fairy Ozana, her kitten Felina, and her wooden puppet people the Hi-Los.

Prior to their acceptance of Snow as an Oz author, publisher Reilly & Lee had solicited veteran children's-book writer Mary Dickerson Donahey for the job. Dickerson Donahey turned the publisher down, however, since she judged that "it would be too much of a struggle to keep track of all the characters and plots in the series."

Snow drew upon a range of Baum's books for hints and inspirations. A talking Toto, for example, is important in Snow's narrative; Baum first made Toto speak at the end of Tik-Tok of Oz. Yet the work that Snow relied upon most heavily for Magical Mimics was Baum's sixth Oz book, The Emerald City of Oz.

=== Mimics and Phanfasms ===
Snow based his villainous Magical Mimics on the Phanfasms in Baum's Emerald City. In the eleventh chapter of that book, Baum states that "the Erbs are the most powerful and merciless of all evil spirits, and the Phanfasms of Phantastico belong to the race of Erbs." Snow makes his Mimics another type of Erb; they live within the hollows of Mount Illuso, a peak next door to Mount Phantastico. Like the Phanfasms, the Mimics are ugly and malevolent shape-shifters; they have the additional trick of being able to copy the appearance of humans, simply by stepping into their shadows. People duplicated in this way are paralyzed by the magic, but remain conscious.

The Mimics' inherent malice orients them against all that is "good and happy and just in the world" — which makes them an obvious danger to Oz. The fairy queen Lurline foresaw this: as soon as she had enchanted Oz into a fairyland, Lurline placed one of her followers in watch over the Mimics, to forestall their mischief.

=== Structure and nuance ===
Snow also structures his story as Baum did his Emerald City. In that book, Baum expanded upon the simple narrative type he often favors to tell a double story, shifting perspective between views of the good and the evil characters. Snow does the same in Magical Mimics.

The two books are also united by subtle commonalities. One example: while General Guph is travelling to the Mountain of Phantastico in Emerald City, Chapter 11, a friendly talking squirrel advises him to "Look out!" As Dorothy and the Wizard walk to Ozana's cottage in the tenth chapter of Magical Mimics, they also encounter the advice of a friendly talking squirrel.

=== Story Blossom Garden ===
One notable imaginative feature of Snow's book is Ozana's Story Blossom Garden. Ozana's magically-bred human-faced talking flowers appeal to be picked, so that they can tell their stories into people's ears. Every flower tells its own unique tale, and each type of flower relates one kind of narrative. Roses tell love stories, though rambling roses tell travel stories. Tulips tell Dutch stories. Pansies yield fairy tales, while a tiger lily will recount "a thrilling story of splendid silken beasts in their sultry jungle lairs." A "spicily-scented" pink carnation can provide "an exciting story of intrigue and adventure in high places." Water lilies supply sea tales, while lotus blossoms and poppies offer their own seductive choices. Even the occasional weed offers a tale, about "Dick Superguy — greatest detective in the world!"

== Reception; later editions ==
The first edition of Magical Mimics was not a commercial success; a backlog of unsold copies delayed the next Oz book, originally projected for 1947, until 1949. Kramer's illustrations for Magical Mimics have been criticized as deficient.

Magical Mimics had been out of print for decades when the International Wizard of Oz Club issued a reprint in 1990, with an Afterword by Michael Gessel. Other editions followed, from Books of Wonder (1991) and Kessinger (2007).

The Oz books
| Previous book: Lucky Bucky in Oz | The Magical Mimics in Oz; 1946 | Next book: The Shaggy Man of Oz |
