= Douglas G. Greene =

American historian, editor, and author (born 1944)

Douglas G. Greene (born September 24, 1944) is an American historian, editor, and author. He is the son of Margaret Chindahl Greene and the Reverend George L. Greene, He is married to Sandi Greene with whom he has a son, Eric and a daughter, Katherine, and has an identical twin, David L. Greene, and a younger brother Paul.

Greene is Emeritus Professor of History at Old Dominion University, specialising in Tudor and Stuart Britain. He is a Charter Member of The International Wizard of Oz Club, founded in 1957, and he was a frequent contributor to The Baum Bugle. He is co-author of a biography of Oz illustrator W. W. Denslow and co-editor of stories and poems by Oz author Ruth Plumly Thompson. He was co-owner and editor of mystery publisher Crippen & Landru through 2017, continuing as senior editor beginning in 2018, and has edited numerous Mystery fiction collections for both his own and other publishing houses. In 2014, the non-fiction anthology Mysteries Unlocked: Essays in Honor of Douglas G. Greene was released to celebrate his 70th birthday, with ten Edgar Award winning or nominated authors among those contributing. Greene's biography John Dickson Carr: The Man Who Explained Miracles was nominated in 1996 for the Edgar Award Best Critical / Biographical Work.

== Awards ==
- 1965 - The L. Frank Baum Memorial Award from The International Wizard of Oz Club
- 2001 - The Ellery Queen Award from the Mystery Writers of America
- 2003 - The Malice Domestic Poirot Award
- 2003 - Baker Street Irregulars Distinguished Speaker
- 2007 - The George N. Dove Award from the Popular Culture Association for "serious study of mystery and crime fiction"
- 2016 - The Malice Domestic Amelia Award

== Selected bibliography ==
Books written or edited by Douglas G. Greene:

- 1974 - The Earl of Castlehaven's Memoirs of the Irish Wars
- 1976 - W. W. Denslow (with Michael Patrick Hearn)
- 1976 - Bibliographia Oziana (with Peter E. Hanff) revised edition, 1998.
- 1977 - Diaries of the Popish Plot
- 1978 - The Meditations of Lady Elizabeth Delaval
- 1980 - The Door to Doom and Other Detections
- 1983 - The Dead Sleep Lightly and Other Mysteries from Radio’s Golden Age
- 1985 - The Wizard of Way Up and Other Wonders (with James E. Haff)
- 1987 - Death Locked In, An Anthology of Locked Room Stories (with Robert Adey)
- 1989 - The Collected Short Fiction of Ngaio Marsh; reprinted as Alleyn and Others
- 1991 - Merrivale, March and Murder
- 1991 - Fell and Foul Play
- 1995 - John Dickson Carr: The Man Who Explained Miracles
- 1997 - Detection by Gaslight, The Great Victorian and Edwardian Detective Stories
- 1999 - The Dead Hand and other Uncollected Stories (with Tony Medawar)
- 1999 - Grand Guignol (in Japanese)
- 1999 - Classic Mystery Stories
- 2003 - Sissajig and Other Surprises (with Ruth Berman)
- 2003 - The Romance of the Secret Service Fund
- 2010 - The Adventures of Rogan Kincaid
- 2010 - The Complete Deteckative Memoirs of Philo Gubb, Esquire
- 2012 - Before the Fact
- 2014 - The Compleat Achievements of Luther Trant
- 2014 - The Compleat Adventures of Solange Fontaine
- 2015 - I Believe in Sherlock Holmes
- 2019 - The Cases of Lieutenant Timothy Trant (with Curtis Evans)
- 2020 - The Island of Coffins {with Tony Medawar}
