= The Linemen =

- Origin: Washington D.C., United States
- Genres: Alternative Country
- Years active: 1991–2001, 2013–2018
- Label: SAM Records
- Past members: Kevin Royal Johnson; Jonathan Gregg; Scott McKnight; Bill Williams; Antoine Sanfuentes; Eric Brace; Tony Flagg; Dave Giegerich; James Key; Dave Chappell; Mookie Siegel

The Linemen were an American Alternative Country band originating from Washington, D.C, formed in 1991. The group's members were Kevin Royal Johnson (lead vocals, acoustic guitar), Jonathan Gregg (lead vocals, guitar, pedal steel), Bill Williams (guitars, vocals), Antoine Sanfuentes (drums), and Scott McKnight (bass, vocals). Kevin Johnson and the Linemen released four albums on the SAM Records label before taking a hiatus in 2001.

In 2013, the band announced a return as simply The Linemen, and their fifth full-length album, Close the Place Down, was released on the SAM Records label in October 2016. The band's final performance was at Swamp Stomp in Kingston, RI on July 21, 2018.

The band's name is a nod to the Jimmy Webb song “Wichita Lineman.”

== History ==
=== Kevin Johnson and the Linemen (1991–2001) ===
Kevin Johnson and the Linemen formed in 1991 with Eric Brace, Antoine Sanfuentes, and Bill Williams. New members Tony Flagg (bass) and Scott McKnight (guitar) replaced Brace and Williams in 1994, and added were additional musicians James Key (mandolin) and Dave Giegerich (dobro, steel guitar).

Kevin Johnson and the Linemen's first album, Memphis for Breakfast, was recorded at Ardent Studios in Memphis, Tennessee, and was produced by Grammy-nominated John Alagia, later known for his work with Dave Matthews, Liz Phair and John Mayer. The band's second album, The Rest of Your Life, was again produced by Alagia, with album art was designed by Jeff Nelson, co-founder of Dischord Records and drummer for Minor Threat. The Linemen's third album, Parole Music, was produced by Boston singer-songwriter Charlie Chesterman, formerly of Scruffy the Cat, and featured guest vocalist Barbara Brousal. The liner notes for The Linemen's fourth album Sunday Driver, were written by noted crime author George P. Pelecanos. In 2001 Johnson took a hiatus from music in order to start a rare book business in Baltimore.

=== The Linemen (2013–2018) ===
In 2013 the band reformed under the name The Linemen, adding Jonathan Gregg as a second lead vocalist, lead guitarist, and pedal steel guitarist, along with band alumni Scott McKnight (bass), Bill Williams (guitar, slide guitar, mandolin), and Antoine Sanfuentes (drums). In the fall of 2016 they released their first album with the new lineup, Close the Place Down, recorded by Andrew Taub at Brooklyn Recording and mixed by John Alagia at Village Recorder in West Los Angeles. Songs on the album were written by Kevin Johnson and Jonathan Gregg individually or co-written by Johnson and Gregg, and two songs were co-written by Johnson with Williams and McKnight, respectively. Three songs from Gregg's previous band, The Lonesome Debonaires, were also included.

Gregg credits his Gretsch 6120 with his sonic approach to this album and how the songs evolved, while his influences encompass roots styles such as bluegrass and country as well as rock legends such as The Rolling Stones, The Beatles and Elvis Costello. Reviewers compared the album to the likes of The Jayhawks, Tom Petty, Ryan Adams, and Wilco. The record release show for Close the Place Down was held at The Bowery Electric in New York City on November 13, 2016.

Principal Members 1991-2018

- Kevin Royal Johnson — lead vocals, guitar (1991-2001, 2013–2018)
- Jonathan Gregg — secondary lead vocals, guitar, pedal steel guitar (2013–2018)
- Scott McKnight — bass guitar (1994-2001, 2013–2018)
- Bill Williams — guitar, slide guitar, mandolin (1991-1994, 2013–2018)
- Antoine Sanfuentes — drums (1991-2001, 2013–2018)

Other Members 1991-2001

- Eric Brace (bass, vocals)— (1991-1994)
- Tony Flagg (bass) — (1994-2001)
- Dave Giegerich (dobro, steel guitar) — (1994-2001)
- James Key (mandolin)— (1994-2001)
- Dave Chappell (guitar)— (1994-2001)
- Mookie Siegel (keyboards)— (1994-2001)
- Jeff Travis (bass)— (1994)
- Evan Pollack (drums)— (1994-2001)

== Discography ==
- Memphis for Breakfast (1991), SAM Records
- The Rest of Your Life (1994), SAM Records
- Parole Music (1997), SAM Records
- Sunday Driver (2000), SAM Records
- Various Artists Americana Motel (2001), compilation on Bay Gumbo Music
- Close the Place Down (2016), SAM Records
