= 1997 Edward R. Murrow Awards (Radio Television Digital News Association) =

The 1997 Edward R. Murrow Awards were presented by the Radio-Television News Directors Association (RTNDA), now renamed the Radio Television Digital News Association (RTDNA) in recognition of what the association terms "outstanding achievements in electronic journalism." National winners were selected from a pool of regional award winners. Below are the 1997 national and regional award winners, which recognizes coverage that aired during the previous 1996 calendar year.

Categories that are not listed either had no entrants or the entries received were not deemed worthy of the award. For regional awards, it is worth noting the states included in each region have changed through the years. The lists below indicate which states are included in each region for the 1997 awards. The category currently called Breaking News was called "Spot News Coverage" in 1997, so the lists below have been edited to read Breaking/Spot News to avoid any confusion.

The information on this page was retrieved using the Archive.org Internet Wayback Machine to access the now defunct website for RTNDA, a domain that was abandoned when the organization was renamed RTDNA.

== 1997 National Edward R. Murrow Award Winners ==
=== Local Radio Small Market Division ===
- Overall Excellence: WHO-AM, Des Moines, IA
- Newscast: WIVK-AM, Knoxville, TN
- Breaking/Spot News Coverage: KFGO-AM, Fargo, ND
- Continuing Coverage: WSYR-AM, Syracuse, NY
- Investigative Reporting: WIVK-AM, Knoxville, TN
- Sports Reporting: WJDX/WMSI-FM, Jackson, MS
- News Series: WHAS-AM, Louisville, KY
- News Documentary: WUAL-FM, Tuscaloosa, AL

=== Local Radio Large Market Division ===
- Overall Excellence: WBAL-AM, Baltimore
- Newscast: WBZ-AM, Boston
- Breaking/Spot News Coverage: WGST-AM, Atlanta
- Continuing Coverage: WFLS-AM, Fredericksburg, VA
- Investigative Reporting: WJR-AM, Detroit
- Feature Reporting: WBAP-AM, Arlington, TX
- Sports Reporting: WBAL-AM, Baltimore
- News Series: WLW-AM, Cincinnati
- News Documentary: WMNF-FM, Tampa, FL
- Use of Sound: KCBS-AM, San Francisco

=== Local Television Small Market Division ===
- Overall Excellence: WJXT-TV, Jacksonville, FL
- Newscast: WOKR-TV, Rochester, NY
- Breaking/Spot News Coverage: KHQ-TV, Spokane, WA
- Continuing Coverage: KREM-TV, Spokane, WA
- Investigative Reporting: WWMT-TV, Kalamazoo, MI
- Feature Reporting: KSL-TV, Salt Lake City, UT
- Sports Reporting: WBRC-TV, Birmingham, AL
- News Series: KWTV, Oklahoma City, OK
- News Documentary: KREM-TV, Spokane, WA
- Use of Video: WAVE-TV, Louisville, KY

=== Local Television Large Market Division ===
- Overall Excellence: KARE-TV, Minneapolis
- Newscast: WCVB-TV, Needham, MA
- Breaking/Spot News Coverage: WEWS-TV, Cleveland
- Continuing Coverage: KATU-TV, Portland, OR
- Investigative Reporting: WAGA-TV, Atlanta
- Feature Reporting: WFAA-TV, Dallas
- Sports Reporting: WITI-TV, Milwaukee
- News Series: WXYZ-TV, Southfield, MI
- News Documentary: WJLA-TV, Washington
- Use of Video: KTVT-TV, Fort Worth, TX

=== Network Radio Division ===
- Overall Excellence: ABC News Radio, New York
- Newscast: ABC News Radio, New York
- Breaking/Spot News Coverage: North Carolina News Network, Raleigh, NC
- Continuing Coverage: ABC News Radio, New York
- Feature Reporting: ABC News Radio, New York
- News Series: Wisconsin Public Radio, Madison, WI

=== Network Television Division ===
- Newscast: Univision Network News, Miami
- Breaking/Spot News Coverage: Dateline NBC, New York
- Continuing Coverage: Nightline, ABC News, New York
- Investigative Reporting: Dateline NBC, New York
- Feature Reporting: Dateline NBC, New York
- Sports Reporting: Dateline NBC, New York
- News Series: Dateline NBC, New York
- News Documentary: Turning Point, ABC News, New York

== 1997 Regional Edward R. Murrow Award Winners ==
=== Region 1: Alaska, Colorado, Idaho, Montana, New Mexico, Oregon, Utah, Washington, Wyoming ===
==== Region 1: Radio Small Market ====
- Newscast: KSL-AM, Salt Lake City
- Breaking/Spot News Coverage: KFQD-AM, Anchorage, AK
- Continuing Coverage: KUNM-FM, Albuquerque, NM
- Feature Reporting: KTOO-FM, Juneau, AK
- News Series: KSL-AM, Salt Lake City

==== Region 1: Radio Large Market ====
- Overall Excellence: KOMO-AM, Seattle
- Newscast: KOMO-AM, Seattle
- Continuing Coverage: KEX-AM, Portland, OR
- Feature Reporting: KGMI-AM, Bellingham, WA
- News Series: KEX-AM, Portland, OR
- Sports Reporting: KOA-AM, Denver
- Use of Sound: KPLU-FM, Tacoma, WA

==== Region 1: Television Small Market ====
- Overall Excellence: KREM-TV, Spokane, WA
- Newscast: KSL-TV, Salt Lake City
- Breaking/Spot News Coverage: KHQ-TV, Spokane, WA
- Continuing Coverage: KREM-TV, Spokane, WA
- Feature Reporting: KSL-TV, Salt Lake City
- Investigative Reporting: KOAT-TV, Albuquerque, NM
- News Documentary: KREM-TV, Spokane, WA
- News Series: KREM-TV, Spokane, WA
- Sports Reporting: KXLY-TV, Spokane, WA
- Use of Video: KSTU-TV, Salt Lake City

==== Region 1: Television Large Market ====
- Overall Excellence: KUSA-TV, Denver
- Newscast: KCNC-TV, Denver
- Breaking/Spot News Coverage: KOIN-TV, Portland, OR
- Continuing Coverage: KATU-TV, Portland, OR
- Feature Reporting: KUSA-TV, Denver
- Investigative Reporting: KSTW-TV, Tacoma, WA
- News Documentary: KSTW-TV, Tacoma, WA
- News Series: KGW-TV, Portland, OR
- Use of Video: KCNC-TV, Denver

=== Region 2: Arizona, California, Hawaii, Nevada ===
==== Region 2: Radio Small Market ====
- No Winners

==== Region 2: Radio Large Market ====
- Overall Excellence: KCBS-AM, San Francisco
- Newscast: KCBS-AM, San Francisco
- Breaking/Spot News Coverage: KNX-AM, Los Angeles
- Continuing Coverage: KNX-AM, Los Angeles
- Feature Reporting: KNX-AM, Los Angeles
- News Documentary: KNX-AM, Los Angeles
- News Series: KNX-AM, Los Angeles
- Sports Reporting: KNX-AM, Los Angeles
- Use of Sound: KCBS-AM, San Francisco

==== Region 2: Television Small Market ====
- Newscast: KTNV-TV, Las Vegas
- Continuing Coverage: KVBC-TV, Las Vegas
- Feature Reporting: KLAS-TV, Las Vegas
- News Documentary: KLVX-TV, Las Vegas
- Sports Reporting: KGET-TV, Bakersfield, CA

==== Region 2: Television Large Market ====
- Overall Excellence: KCAL-TV, Hollywood
- Newscast: KCOP-TV, Los Angeles
- Breaking/Spot News Coverage: KPNX-TV, Phoenix
- Continuing Coverage: KCBS-TV, Los Angeles
- Feature Reporting: KTLA-TV, Los Angeles
- Investigative Reporting: KNXV-TV, Phoenix
- News Series: KMEX-TV, Los Angeles
- News Documentary: KCAL-TV, Hollywood
- Sports Reporting: KPNX-TV, Phoenix

=== Region 3: Iowa, Kansas, Minnesota, Missouri, Nebraska, North Dakota, South Dakota, Wisconsin ===
==== Region 3: Radio Small Market ====
- Overall Excellence: WHO-AM, Des Moines, IA
- Newscast: WOC-AM, Davenport, IA
- Breaking/Spot News Coverage: KFGO-AM, Fargo, ND
- Continuing Coverage: WHO-AM, Des Moines, IA
- Feature Reporting: KIOA-AM, Des Moines, IA
- News Documentary: KUWS-FM, Superior, WI
- News Series: KFGO-AM, Fargo, ND

==== Region 3: Radio Large Market ====
- Overall Excellence: WTMJ-AM, Milwaukee
- Breaking/Spot News Coverage: WTMJ-AM, Milwaukee
- Continuing Coverage: WTMJ-AM, Milwaukee
- Feature Reporting: WTMJ-AM, Milwaukee
- Investigative Reporting: KWMU-FM, St. Louis
- News Series: WCCO-AM, Minneapolis
- Use of Sound: WTMJ-AM, Milwaukee

==== Region 3: Television Small Market ====
- Overall Excellence: WHO-TV, Des Moines, IA
- Breaking/Spot News Coverage: KAKE-TV, Wichita, KS
- Feature Reporting: KAKE-TV, Wichita, KS
- Investigative Reporting: WOWT-TV, Omaha, NE
- News Documentary: WDAY-TV, Fargo, ND
- News Series: KAKE-TV, Wichita, KS

==== Region 3: Television Large Market ====
- Overall Excellence: KARE-TV, Minneapolis
- Newscast: KARE-TV, Minneapolis
- Breaking/Spot News Coverage: KARE-TV, Minneapolis
- Continuing Coverage: WTMJ-TV, Milwaukee
- Feature Reporting: KARE-TV, Minneapolis
- News Series: KARE-TV, Minneapolis
- Sports Reporting: WITI-TV, Milwaukee
- Use of Video: KARE-TV, Minneapolis

=== Region 4: Alabama, Arkansas, Louisiana, Mississippi, Oklahoma, Texas ===
==== Region 4: Radio Small Market ====
- Overall Excellence: KVOO-AM, Tulsa, OK
- Newscast: WOAI-AM, San Antonio
- Breaking/Spot News Coverage: KVOO-AM, Tulsa, OK
- Continuing Coverage: KVOO-AM, Tulsa, OK
- Feature Reporting: WOAI-AM, San Antonio
- News Documentary: WUAL-FM, Tuscaloosa, AL
- News Series: WUAL-FM, Tuscaloosa, AL
- Sports Reporting: WJDX-FM, Jackson, MS
- Use of Sound: KVOO-AM, Tulsa, OK

==== Region 4: Radio Large Market ====
- Overall Excellence: KTRH-AM, Houston
- Newscast: KTRH-AM, Houston
- Breaking/Spot News Coverage: KTRH-AM, Houston
- Continuing Coverage: KETR-FM, Commerce, TX
- Continuing Coverage: KKDA-AM, Grand Prairie, TX
- Feature Reporting: WBAP-AM, Arlington, TX
- Use of Sound: KTRH-AM, Houston

==== Region 4: Television Small Market ====
- Overall Excellence: KOTV, Tulsa, OK
- Newscast: KOTV, Tulsa, OK
- Breaking/Spot News Coverage: WBRC-TV, Birmingham, AL
- Continuing Coverage: WSFA-TV, Montgomery, AL
- Feature Reporting: WDSU-TV, New Orleans
- Investigative Reporting: WALA-TV, Mobile, AL
- Investigative Reporting: WBRC-TV, Birmingham, AL
- Investigative Reporting: WDSU-TV, New Orleans
- News Documentary: KFOR-TV, Oklahoma City
- News Series: KWTV-TV, Oklahoma City
- Sports Reporting: WBRC-TV, Birmingham, AL
- Use of Video: WWL-TV, New Orleans

==== Region 4: Television Large Market ====
- Newscast: WFAA-TV, Dallas
- Breaking/Spot News Coverage: KTRK-TV, Houston
- Continuing Coverage: KRIV-TV, Houston
- Feature Reporting: WFAA-TV, Dallas
- Investigative Reporting: KXAS-TV, Fort Worth, TX
- News Series: WFAA-TV, Dallas
- Use of Video: KTVT-TV, Fort Worth, TX

=== Region 5: Illinois, Indiana, Michigan, Ohio, West Virginia ===
==== Region 5: Radio Small Market ====
- Newscast: WMBD-AM, Peoria, IL
- Breaking/Spot News Coverage: WSOY-AM, Decatur, IL
- Continuing Coverage: WJBC-AM, Bloomington, IL
- Feature Reporting: WSIU-FM, Carbondale, IL
- News Documentary: WSGW-AM, Saginaw, MI
- News Series: WSIU-FM, Carbondale, IL
- Use of Sound: WSGW-AM, Saginaw, MI

==== Region 5: Radio Large Market ====
- Overall Excellence: WBBM-AM, Chicago
- Newscast: WIBC-AM, Indianapolis
- Breaking/Spot News Coverage: WBBM-AM, Chicago
- Continuing Coverage: WBBM-AM, Chicago
- Feature Reporting: WBBM-AM, Chicago
- Investigative Reporting: WJR-AM, Detroit
- News Documentary: WHBC-AM/FM, Canton, OH
- News Series: WLW-AM, Cincinnati
- Sports Reporting: WNDE-AM, Indianapolis
- Use of Sound: WBEZ-FM, Chicago

==== Region 5: Television Small Market ====
- Overall Excellence: WHIO-TV, Dayton, OH
- Newscast: WNDU-TV, South Bend, IN
- Breaking/Spot News Coverage: WTOV-TV, Steubenville, OH
- Continuing Coverage: WHIO-TV, Dayton, OH
- Feature Reporting: WQAD-TV, Moline, IL
- Investigative Reporting: WWMT-TV, Kalamazoo, MI
- News Documentary: WTOL-TV, Toledo, OH
- News Series: WICS-TV, Springfield, IL
- Sports Reporting: WICD-TV, Champaign, IL
- Use of Video: WWMT-TV, Kalamazoo, MI

==== Region 5: Television Large Market ====
- Overall Excellence: WBNS-TV, Columbus, OH
- Newscast: WKRC-TV, Cincinnati
- Breaking/Spot News Coverage: WEWS-TV, Cleveland
- Continuing Coverage: WXIN-TV, Indianapolis
- Feature Reporting: WTHR-TV, Indianapolis
- Investigative Reporting: WMAQ-TV, Chicago
- News Series: WXYZ-TV, Southfield, MI
- Sports Reporting: WTHR-TV, Indianapolis
- Use of Video: WOIO-TV, Cleveland

=== Region 6: Florida, Georgia, Kentucky, North Carolina, South Carolina, Tennessee ===
==== Region 6: Radio Small Market ====
- Overall Excellence: WIVK-AM, Knoxville, TN
- Newscast: WIVK-AM, Knoxville, TN
- Breaking/Spot News Coverage: WIVK-AM, Knoxville, TN
- Continuing Coverage: WHAS-AM, Louisville, KY
- Feature Reporting: WHAS-AM, Louisville, KY
- Investigative Reporting: WIVK-AM, Knoxville, TN
- News Series: WHAS-AM, Louisville, KY
- Sports Reporting: WHAS-AM, Louisville, KY

==== Region 6: Radio Large Market ====
- Overall Excellence: WSB-AM, Atlanta
- Newscast: WSTR-FM, Atlanta
- Breaking/Spot News Coverage: WGST-AM, Atlanta
- Continuing Coverage: WGST-AM, Atlanta
- News Documentary: WMNF-FM, Tampa, FL
- Sports Reporting: WSB-AM, Atlanta

==== Region 6: Television Small Market ====
- Overall Excellence: WJXT-TV, Jacksonville, FL
- Newscast: WPBF-TV, Palm Beach Gardens, FL
- Breaking/Spot News Coverage: WIS-TV, Columbia, SC
- Continuing Coverage: WGHP-TV, High Point, NC
- Continuing Coverage: WHAS-TV, Louisville, KY
- Feature Reporting: WHAS-TV, Louisville, KY
- Investigative Reporting: WLKY-TV, Louisville, KY
- News Documentary: WHAS-TV, Louisville, KY
- News Series: WTLV-TV, Jacksonville, FL
- Sports Reporting: WLKY-TV, Louisville, KY
- Use of Video: WAVE-TV, Louisville, KY

==== Region 6: Television Large Market ====
- Overall Excellence: WKRN-TV, Nashville, TN
- Newscast: WKRN-TV, Nashville, TN
- Breaking/Spot News Coverage: WFLA-TV, Tampa, FL
- Continuing Coverage: WTVD-TV, Durham, NC
- Feature Reporting: WRAL-TV, Raleigh, NC
- Investigative Reporting: WAGA-TV, Atlanta
- News Documentary: WRAL-TV, Raleigh, NC
- News Series: WTVJ-TV, Miami
- Use of Video: WSMV-TV, Nashville, TN

=== Region 7: New Jersey, New York, Pennsylvania ===
==== Region 7: Radio Small Market ====
- Newscast: WSYR-AM, Syracuse, NY
- Continuing Coverage: WSYR-AM, Syracuse, NY
- News Series: WHAM, Rochester, NY

==== Region 7: Radio Large Market ====
- Newscast: KDKA-AM, Pittsburgh
- Breaking/Spot News Coverage: KYW-AM, Philadelphia
- Continuing Coverage: WCBS-AM, New York
- Feature Reporting: WHYY-FM, Philadelphia
- Investigative Reporting: WCBS-AM, New York
- News Series: WGLS-FM, Glassboro, NJ

==== Region 7: Television Small Market ====
- Overall Excellence: WOKR-TV, Rochester, NY
- Newscast: WOKR-TV, Rochester, NY
- Breaking/Spot News Coverage: WOKR-TV, Rochester, NY
- Investigative Reporting: WKBW-TV, Buffalo, NY
- News Documentary: WXXI-TV, Rochester, NY
- News Series: WTVH-TV, Syracuse, NY

==== Region 7: Television Large Market ====
- Newscast: WTAE-TV, Pittsburgh
- Breaking/Spot News Coverage: WTAE-TV, Pittsburgh
- Feature Reporting: WPIX-TV, New York
- Investigative Reporting: KDKA-TV, Pittsburgh
- Sports Reporting: New York 1 News, New York
- Sports Reporting: WTXF-TV, Philadelphia
- Use of Video: WPIX-TV, New York

=== Region 8: Delaware, District of Columbia, Maryland, Virginia ===
==== Region 8: Radio Small Market ====
- Continuing Coverage: WVIR-TV, Charlottesville, VA
- Feature Reporting: WCVE-TV, Richmond, VA
- Investigative Reporting: WAVY-TV, Portsmouth, VA
- News Documentary: WCVE-TV, Richmond, VA
- News Series: WVEC-TV, Norfolk, VA
- Newscast: WVIR-TV, Charlottesville, VA
- Overall Excellence: WBOC-TV, Salisbury, MD
- Sports Reporting: WBOC-TV, Salisbury, MD
- Continuing Coverage: WJMA- AM/FM, Orange, VA
- Feature Reporting: WJMA- AM/FM, Orange, VA
- Newscast: WINA-AM, Charlottesville, VA
- Overall Excellence: WVTF-FM, Roanoke, VA
- Breaking/Spot News Coverage: WVTF-FM, Roanoke, VA
- Use of Sound: WJMA- AM/FM, Orange, VA

==== Region 8: Radio Large Market ====
- Overall Excellence: WBAL-AM, Baltimore
- Newscast: WBAL-AM, Baltimore
- Breaking/Spot News Coverage: WBAL-AM, Baltimore
- Continuing Coverage: WFLS-AM, Fredericksburg, VA
- Feature Reporting: WMAL-AM, Washington
- Investigating Reporting: WBAL-AM, Baltimore
- News Documentary: WBAL-AM, Baltimore
- News Series: WBAL-AM, Baltimore
- Sports Reporting: WBAL-AM, Baltimore
- Use of Sound: WBAL-AM, Baltimore

==== Region 8: Television Small Market ====
- Overall Excellence: WBOC-TV, Salisbury, MD
- Newscast: WVIR-TV, Charlottesville, VA
- Continuing Coverage: WVIR-TV, Charlottesville, VA
- Feature Reporting: WCVE-TV, Richmond, VA
- Investigative Reporting: WAVY-TV, Portsmouth, VA
- News Documentary: WCVE-TV, Richmond, VA
- News Series: WVEC-TV, Norfolk, VA
- Sports Reporting: WBOC-TV, Salisbury, MD

==== Region 8: Television Large Market ====
- Overall Excellence: WJLA-TV, Washington
- Newscast: WRC-TV, Washington
- Breaking/Spot News Coverage: WBFF-TV, Baltimore
- Continuing Coverage: WJLA-TV, Washington
- Feature Reporting: WRC-TV, Washington
- Investigative Reporting: WJLA-TV, Washington
- News Documentary: WJLA-TV, Washington
- News Series: WRC-TV, Washington
- Use of Video: WBFF-TV, Baltimore

=== Region 9: Connecticut, Massachusetts, Maine, New Hampshire, Rhode Island, Vermont ===
==== Region 9: Radio Small Market ====
- Overall Excellence: WCFR-AM, Springfield, VT
- Continuing Coverage: WTSL-AM, Lebanon, NH
- News Series: WCFR-AM, Springfield, VT
- Use of Sound: WPRO-AM, East Providence, RI

==== Region 9: Radio Large Market ====
- Overall Excellence: WBZ-AM, Boston
- Newscast: WBZ-AM, Boston
- Breaking/Spot News Coverage: WATD-FM, Marshfield, MA
- Continuing Coverage: WBZ-AM, Boston

==== Region 9: Television Small Market ====
- Overall Excellence: WJAR-TV, Cranston, RI
- Newscast: WJAR-TV, Cranston, RI
- Breaking/Spot News Coverage: WJAR-TV, Cranston, RI
- Continuing Coverage: WLNE-TV, Providence, RI
- Feature Reporting: WLBZ-TV, Bangor, ME
- Investigating Report: WJAR-TV, Cranston, RI
- News Documentary: WJAR-TV, Cranston, RI
- News Series: WGGB-TV, Springfield, MA
- Use of Video: WJAR-TV, Cranston, RI

==== Region 9: Television Large Market ====
- Overall Excellence: WHDH-TV, Boston
- Newscast: WCVB-TV, Needham, MA
- Continuing Coverage: WCVB-TV, Needham, MA
- Feature Reporting: New England Cable News, Newton, MA
- Investigative Reporting: WCVB-TV, Needham, MA
- News Series: WHDH-TV, Boston
- Sports Reporting: New England Cable News, Newton, MA
- Use of Video: WCVB-TV, Needham, MA

=== International ===
==== International: Radio Small Market ====
- No Winners

==== International: Radio Large Market ====
- No Winners

==== International: Television Small Market ====
- No Winners

==== International: Television Large Market ====
- Newscast: Television Broadcasts Limited, Kowloon, Hong Kong
- Breaking/Spot News Coverage: Television Broadcasts Limited, Kowloon, Hong Kong
- Investigative Reporting: Television Broadcasts Limited, Kowloon, Hong Kong
- News Series: U.TV, Vancouver, Canada
- Use of Video: U.TV, Vancouver, Canada

== See also ==
- Edward R. Murrow
