= The Shaggy Man of Oz =

Book by Jack Snow

- Cover of The Shaggy Man of Oz.
- Author: Jack Snow
- Illustrator: Frank Kramer
- Language: English
- Series: The Oz Books
- Genre: Fantasy
- Publisher: Reilly & Lee
- Publication date: 1949
- Publication place: United States
- Media type: print (hardcover)
- Preceded by: The Magical Mimics in Oz
- Followed by: The Hidden Valley of Oz

The Shaggy Man of Oz (1949) is the thirty-eighth book in the Oz series created by L. Frank Baum and his successors, and the second and last by Jack Snow. It was illustrated by Frank G. Kramer. The book was followed by The Hidden Valley of Oz (1951). The novel entered the public domain in the United States when its copyright was not renewed as required.

In The Shaggy Man of Oz as in his previous novel, The Magical Mimics in Oz (1946), Snow returned to the Oz books of Baum for his inspiration and his conceptual framework. He avoided all use of characters and plot elements introduced in the Oz books of Ruth Plumly Thompson and John R. Neill, his predecessors in the post of "Royal Historian of Oz."

== Plot ==
Abbadiah and Zebbidiah Jones are twins from Buffalo, New York; they prefer to go by their nicknames, Twink and Tom. The twins enjoy watching cowboy serials on the family TV set, customized by their scientist father with its own wall-sized projection screen. While the twins are watching the TV one afternoon, the normal picture changes into a strangely beautiful scene with a castle in the background. They are confronted by a living toy clown, a duplicate of the familiar toy they have named Twoffle. This living version, who calls himself Twiffle, persuades them to walk into the screen before them; the two children find themselves magically transported into the scene.

Twiffle explains that he is a third cousin of the twins' toy, Twoffle; the two have had long conversations about Twink and Tom while the children have slept. Twiffle serves a sorcerer named Conjo; they are on Conjo's island in the Nonestic Ocean, and are heading toward Conjo's castle.

Meanwhile, a problem has arisen in the Emerald City in Oz; the love magnet (introduced by Baum in his fifth Oz book, The Road to Oz) had been hanging above the city's entrance gate, but has now fallen from its nail and broken in two. Princess Ozma consults with the Shaggy Man, who first brought the talisman to Oz; they determine that the magnet can be repaired only by the magician who created it — none other than Conjo. In the Magic Picture, they watch Twink and Tom approach Conjo's castle with Twiffle. Surprised at the presence of two human children, Ozma decides to send Shaggy there immediately to investigate. Ozma equips Shaggy with a magic compass that will return him to Oz whenever he chooses. (Ozma herself will be unavailable, sequestered with Glinda the Good as they work on deep magics.)

Ozma transports Shaggy with her Magic Belt; he joins the children and Twiffle, much to their surprise. The four of them go to meet Conjo, who is short, fat, bald, and untrustworthy. Conjo agrees to repair the love magnet, though he wants Shaggy's magic compass in payment. The visitors stay the night; but Shaggy is awakened from sleep by a slight disturbance in his guest bedroom. He discovers that Conjo has repaired and surreptitiously returned the love magnet, but also has taken the magic compass. Twiffle insists that Conjo is not overtly evil, merely "selfish, lazy, and foolishly vain." Yet Conjo has lured the twins to his island to rob them of their memories and use them as his servants, which is malicious enough. Shaggy, Twink, Tom, and Twiffle escape from the island in Conjo's Airmobile.

They reach a sky country called Hightown, and the Airmobile is inadvertently lost, stranding them. They learn they can leave Hightown merely by swimming and walking down through the air, since gravity does not function in the place's vicinity. They next find their way to the Valley of Romance, where they stumble into a nightmare of incompetent amateur theater. Shaggy and Twink are bewitched into serving as cast members in an inept stage play. Tom and Twoffle manage to free them and break the spell of the place, by showing the love magnet to the Valley's king, queen, and assembled lords and ladies. (In Snow's narrative, the magnet has to be displayed to have its effect.)

Traveling again, the four encounter the King of the Fairy Beavers. The King agrees to help them reach Oz, if they invite him for a visit — and Shaggy is happy to oblige. The protagonists and their beaver companions make their way under the Deadly Desert through the Nome King's tunnel (see The Emerald City of Oz). They pass the barrier of invisibility that shields Oz from the outside world, and arrive in Oz — only to stumble into a crisis. Conjo has used the magic compass to reach Oz, where he grabs the Wizard's black bag of magic and locks himself in the Wizard's laboratory. Conjo wants to supplant the Wizard and gain control of Oz for himself. The Fairy Beaver King defeats Conjo with his water magic, squirting a jet of water from the Forbidden Fountain into Conjo's mouth. The now amnesiac Conjo is easy to manage and reform; he is returned to his island in Twiffle's care, for re-education. Twink and Tom enjoy a pleasant stay in Oz before Ozma sends them home once again.

== Development ==
=== Shaggy Man and John Dough ===
For his first Oz book, Snow had relied heavily upon Baum's The Emerald City of Oz. (Far from concealing it, Snow made the relationship between the two books clear in his text.) For his second venture, Snow depended upon Baum's 1906 novel John Dough and the Cherub. In both books, the protagonists escape an exotic but risky place (in Baum, the Island of Phreex; in Snow, Conjo's island) in a borrowed flying machine; they travel to other places from which, in turn, they again need to escape. Baum has a Palace of Romance, and Snow, a Valley of Romance. In Baum's Hiland, the people are tall and thin and live in tall thin houses — just as in Snow's Hightown. And in both novels, the heroes meet the King of the Fairy Beavers, who helps them to their final destination.

=== Modernizing ===
Though Snow relied on Baum's forty-year-old book for inspiration, he also faced a need to update the Oz enterprise. His first Oz book, launched in the post–World War II world, had not been a commercial success; "Oz books appeared oddly old fashioned and less compelling in an era of rocket engines and atomic bombs." The second book stands in marked contrast to the first in terms of its trappings of modernity. The child protagonists are a contemporary American boy and girl; their father, Professor Jones, teaches physics at a university. The professor owns an early-model television set, and moreover has modified it with a large projection screen of his own design. Conjo the magician has an aircraft — which flies not merely by "magic" but by anti-gravity plates. The episode in Hightown provides further consideration of gravity.

== Reception ==
In the judgement of one critic, Snow's Shaggy Man of Oz "is more credible plotted and developed than Neill's books, but it is deficient in Ozian exuberance and humor."

== Legacy ==
Eric Shanower borrows Twink and Tom, and refers to Snow's book, in his short story "Abby."

The Oz books
Previous book: The Magical Mimics in Oz	The Shaggy Man of Oz; 1949	Next book: The Hidden Valley of Oz
