= The Mundanes =

Former early 1980s band

- Genres: New wave
- Years active: 1978–1983
- Past members: John Andrews; Marsha Armitage; Jonathan Gregg; Dean Lozow; Kevin Tooley; John Linnell; Peter Clemente; Jim Gillson

The Mundanes was an early-1980s Rhode Island-based new wave band. It had six members: John Andrews, Marsha Armitage, Jonathan Gregg, Dean Lozow, Kevin Tooley, and John Linnell. John Andrews was the rhythm guitarist, Marsha Armitage was the lead vocalist, Jonathan Gregg was the lead guitarist, Dean Lozow was the bassist, Kevin Tooley was the drummer, and John Linnell was the keyboardist and saxophonist.

== History ==
The band was initially based in Providence (several of the band members attended Brown University) and played locally in the Boston–Providence area. The band generated tremendous energy and had a devoted following, but struggled to sign to a record label.

In 1981, The Mundanes relocated to New York City. Shortly thereafter, John Linnell left the band to pursue another musical project, They Might Be Giants, with John Flansburgh. Drummer Kevin Tooley was replaced by Peter Clemente, and Jim Gillson replaced John Linnell on keyboards.

The band continued to gig in New England and played frequently in New York City venues, including CBGB. David Hemming, who had previously managed Pat Travers and Ozzy Osbourne, took on the band's management. They recorded a demo at RCA Studios, produced by Mick Ronson, that attracted record label attention, but the band remained unsigned and ultimately broke up in mid-1983.
