= Colorado Antiquarian Book Seminar =

Bookselling training

- Founders: Jacob L. Chernofsky and Margaret Knox Goggin
- Established: 1977
- Mission: Offers training for the profession of antiquarian bookselling
- Director: Lorne Bair
- Staff: Kathy Lindeman, Local Coordinator
- Owner: Antiquarian Book School Foundation, Inc.
- Formerly called: Seminar-Workshop in Out-of-Print and Antiquarian Books
- Location: Colorado College, Colorado Springs, Colorado Springs, Colorado
- Website: https://www.bookseminars.com

The Colorado Antiquarian Book Seminar, founded in the late 1970s, provides training for dealers in out-of-print, used, and antiquarian books.

== Origins ==
The Seminar was the brainchild of Margaret Knox Goggin, on the faculty (and formerly dean) of the School of Librarianship at the University of Denver. The first session, held at the university in December 1977, was primarily intended for librarians who wished to improve their skills in buying used, out-of-print, and rare books. Twenty-five registrants heard lectures by Goggin, Jacob L. Chernofsky (Editor and Publisher of AB Bookman's Weekly), Lee Ash, and Harry U. Mooney (Collection Development Coordinator, Denver Public Library). The success of the venture encouraged Goggin and Chernofsky to offer an annual seminar beginning in 1979 on the out-of-print and antiquarian book market, "designed to help librarians throughout the country with a working knowledge of the out-of-print and antiquarian book trade and the role of that market in acquisitions procedures and collection development." Nearly 50 students attended the 1979 Seminar, which was oriented toward the needs of librarians; nevertheless, "a half dozen booksellers also registered — pointing up the need for such a course for booksellers as well as librarians.” Faculty members at the 1979 Seminar included the autograph dealer Mary A. Benjamin, Franklin Gilliam (Brick Row Book Shop, San Francisco), Edwin V. Glaser (a dealer specializing in rare medical books, based in Sausalito, CA), Katharine Kyes Leab (Editor of American Book Prices Current), Murray S. Martin (Penn State), Bernard M. Rosenthal (a San Francisco-based dealer specializing in early printed books), and Florian Shasky (Stanford University Libraries).

== Early years ==
The Seminar became an annual event held in August at the University of Denver under the co-directorship of Goggin and Chernofsky, its title settling down as "A Workshop-Seminar on the Out-of-Print and Antiquarian Book Market for Booksellers and Librarians," designed "to meet the needs of acquisitions librarians, those responsible for developing collections, rare book librarians, as well as booksellers and prospective booksellers.". The Seminar lecturers varied somewhat from year to year, but a core faculty emerged that included, besides Jake Chernofsky and Margaret Goggin, Michael Ginsberg (an Americana dealer based in Sharon, MA), Ed Glaser, Robert W. Topp (Hermitage Book Shop, Denver), and Jake Zeitlin (Zeitlin & Ver Brugge, Los Angeles). Other stalwart faculty members were to include Mary Francis Ciletti, Lois Harvey, Jennifer Larson, Jean Parmer, and Richard Weatherford. Though there were always a few librarians in attendance, by the mid-1980s, the typical Seminar student was a used, out-of-print, or rare bookseller (or someone who wished to become one).

== Success ==
The Seminar was soon attracting over 100 registrants annually. It ran extra sessions at the University of Florida in March 1988 and March 1994, in addition to the annual sessions in Colorado each August. Its success was chronicled in a series of annual articles by AB Bookman's Weekly's Associate Editor, Rebecca Myers, often titled with some variant of "Book is a four-letter word." Beginning in 1985, a keynote speaker began the proceedings on Sunday night. Notable keynoters included John Y. Cole (1985; Center for the Book, Library of Congress); Marcus A. McCorison (1987; Director and Librarian, American Antiquarian Society); Robert Rosenthal (1989; head of special collections, University of Chicago); and Louis Weinstein (1999; Heritage Book Shop, Los Angeles). By the late 1980s, the Seminar had established a tradition of asking a different specialist dealer to join the faculty each year: Diane deBlois in 1988 (aGatherin', Wynanskill, NY; printed ephemera); Patterson Smith in 1990 (Montclair, NJ; true crime); John Crichton in 1991 (Brick Row Book Shop, San Francisco: literature); Priscilla Juvelis in 1996 (Boston; artists' books); and so on.

== Transition Years ==
Margaret Knox Goggin stepped down as co-director of the Seminar after the 1994 Gainesville and Colorado Seminars, and the Denver connection weakened. The 1993 Seminar was hosted by the Colorado School of Mines in Golden; in 1995 the Seminar moved to Colorado College, in Colorado Springs, Colorado (where it has been, ever since). Chernofsky continued as director, with Jennifer Larson as unnamed co-director; but in the later 1990s his magazine, AB Bookman's Weekly, was faltering, unable to cope with the rise of internet bookselling; AB ceased publication in 1999, and Chernofsky sold the Seminar to faculty members Michael Ginsberg, Edwin Glaser, Lois Harvey, and Jennifer Larson (later, Daniel De Simone and Robert Rulon-Miller, Jr. jointly purchased a 1/5 share of the Seminar from the other shareholders). The Seminar was slow to refocus its presentations on what students most wanted to learn: more about researching and pricing used general-interest books; more about selling on eBay and the internet; less about older and more valuable antiquarian books. Attendance declined; by 2004, the average number of participants had fallen to well under 50.

== CABS Becomes a 501(c)(3) Tax-Exempt Corporation ==
The Seminar reinvigorated itself in the mid-2000s, with faculty additions Terry Belanger, Thomas E. Congalton (Between the Covers Rare Books, Gloucester City, NJ), Daniel De Simone (Rosenwald Curator, Library of Congress), internet specialist Dan Gregory (Between the Covers), Kevin Royal Johnson (Royal Books, Baltimore), and Robert Rulon-Miller, Jr. (Rulon-Miller Books, St Paul, MN) joining Seminar stalwarts Ginsberg and Glaser. Participant response was enthusiastic, and attendance began to climb. The Seminar's title was given its present form: Colorado Antiquarian Book Seminar (CABS) and a new website, and the proprietors relinquished their shares to a tax-exempt, not-for-profit corporation called the Antiquarian Book School Foundation. The current director of CABS is Rob Rulon-Miller and the current local coordinator at Colorado College is Kathy Lindeman; the chairman of the Foundation's board is Rob Rulon-Miller. The ongoing faculty comprises bookseller Lorne W. Bair (Winchester, VA); Terry Belanger (Charlottesville, VA); Brian Cassidy (Silver Spring, MD), Maria Lin (Saint Paul, MN); Katherine Reagan (Curator ofRare Books and Manuscripts, Cornell University, Ithaca, NY), Rob Rulon-Miller (Saint Paul, MN) and Garrett Scott (Ann Arbor, MI).

Since 1980, nearly 3,000 persons have attended the Seminar, which throughout its existence has had the strong support of the Antiquarian Booksellers' Association of America (ABAA): CABS board and faculty members over the years have included ABAA Presidents Thomas E. Congalton, Edwin V. Glaser, Michael Ginsberg, Bernard M. Rosenthal, Robert Rulon-Miller Jr, John Thomson, and others. In recent years, scholarships to CABS have been provided not only by ABAA (Woodburn Scholarships) but also by AbeBooks, Biblio.com, Bibliopolis, IOBA Independent Online Booksellers Association, and the Rocky Mountain Antiquarian Booksellers Association (RMABA) as well as by the faculty themselves. Most of the current attendees are booksellers (or prospective booksellers), but librarians and book collectors sometimes attend, as well.

Now in its 40th year, the Colorado Antiquarian Book Seminar is the oldest, continuously operated educational institution in the world for the antiquarian book trade, predating Rare Book School in Virginia, which was partially modeled on the Colorado Seminar, by nearly five years. Of the nearly 3,000 or so graduates of the Seminar, a remarkably high percentage of them are still involved in books, either as booksellers, librarians, and/or collectors.
