= Antoine Sanfuentes =

- Born: Washington, D.C.
- Education: American University

Antoine Sanfuentes is an American journalist and academic who most recently served as the Vice President and Managing Editor for CNN's Washington Bureau, where he oversaw coverage of the White House and Capitol Hill.

== Career ==
=== NBC ===
Sanfuentes began his career at NBC News in 1990 as an intern in the DC bureau, moving on to become a desk assistant, a production assistant, field producer, futures editor, and a desk editor in quick succession.

In 1995, Tim Russert named Sanfuentes Senior White House Producer, where he led domestic and worldwide coverage for the White House Unit.

Sanfuentes served as the overall producer for live war-time coverage of President George W. Bush’s "Mission Accomplished speech" aboard the USS Abraham Lincoln (CVN-72). In 2007, Sanfuentes was responsible for the live news production from a war zone of President Bush’s remarks during his secret visit to the Anbar Province in Iraq.

In February 2007, he led overall coverage for Vice President Dick Cheney's trip to Kabul, Afghanistan where President Karzai was sworn in.

In 2008, Sanfuentes led coverage of then-Senator Barack Obama’s trip to Baghdad, including on-site reporting from Camp Victory and key interviews notably with General David Petraeus.

Sanfuentes has produced countless live Oval Office presidential addresses, as well as presidential speeches both in the US and abroad.

In 2007, Sanfuentes helped land and produced Ann Curry’s exclusive interview with Sudanese then-President Omar al-Bashir in Khartoum.

In 2009, Sanfuentes was promoted to Deputy Bureau Chief in D.C., followed by a promotion to Vice President and Bureau Chief of the NBC News D.C. bureau in 2011. In 2012, Sanfuentes was promoted again, becoming Senior Vice President and Managing Editor of NBC News.

=== CNN ===
In 2014, his former colleague and current CNN president Jeff Zucker hired Sanfuentes over to CNN as a Senior Supervising Producer in D.C., overseeing Capitol Hill and White House reporting and coverage worldwide.

In 2017, Sanfuentes was promoted to Vice President and Managing Editor in D.C. He served in the role until July 2024.

=== Academia ===
Sanfuentes returned to his alma mater, American University, in January 2022 to serve as Distinguished Guest Lecturer in the School of Communication.

== Photography ==
In 2009, Sanfuentes had his photos taken in while in Darfur and Chad with Ann Curry featured in an exhibit at the Washington School of Photography in Bethesda, Maryland.

In January 2010, the Honfleur Gallery in Washington, D.C. featured an exhibit of photographic stories created by three artists, including Sanfuentes’ 2008 visit to East Goma with Ann Curry, to help raise awareness and funds for relief efforts in African nations. The stories covered topics including children soldiers of Africa, education and rape.

In 2013, Sanfuentes’ work was featured at The Gallery at Vivid Solutions in Washington, D.C. The exhibit, Unsung Jazz, brought together his ongoing project of documenting the local jazz performers who have had a substantial impact on jazz in Washington, DC but are relatively unknown outside the area.

== Awards ==
Sanfuentes has earned various awards for his news coverage including:

- 1999 – Murrow Award
- 2005 – News and Documentary Emmy Award for Outstanding Live Coverage of a Breaking News Story – Long Form: NBC News – “The Death and Funeral of Ronald Wilson Regan”.
- 2007 – Gracie Allen Award: Outstanding Podcast – “Crisis in Darfur – A Conversation with Ann Curry".
- 2007 – News and Documentary Emmy Award for Best Story in a Regularly Scheduled Newscast: NBC Nightly News with Brian Williams – “Crisis in Darfur”; also produced Ann Curry's Emmy award winning reporting in Darfur.
- 2009 – News and Documentary Emmy Award for Outstanding Live Coverage of a Breaking News Story – Long Form: NBC News – “Decision 2008”.
- 2009 – Headliner Award: "Dateline NBC – Out of Africa”.

== Personal life ==
Sanfuentes has recorded as a session drummer in studios musicians such as Danny Gatton and Billy Hancock. He has also recorded several albums with Cathy Ponton King.
