= Edward R. Murrow Award (Radio Television Digital News Association) =

Prize awarded by the Radio Television Digital News Association

The Radio Television Digital News Association (formerly the Radio-Television News Directors Association) has been honoring outstanding achievements in electronic journalism with the Edward R. Murrow Awards since 1971. The Murrow Awards recognize local and national news stories that uphold the RTDNA Code of Ethics, demonstrate technical expertise and exemplify the importance and impact of journalism as a service to the community. Murrow Award winning work demonstrates the excellence that Edward R. Murrow made a standard for the broadcast news profession.

== Judging ==
Submissions are judged by a panel of professional journalists. Entries from individual stations are judged regionally. The winners from each region are given a Regional Edward R. Murrow Award and entered into judging for the national awards. National award winners are recognized each October at the RTDNA Edward R. Murrow Awards Gala in New York City. It is possible for the judges to decide that none of the entries in a given category merit an award, in which case none will be offered.

== Entry divisions ==
Starting in 2015 with the addition of student awards, there were nine divisions of National Edward R. Murrow Award winners. There are two divisions of local radio, local television, and online organizations based on the size of the media market they serve. These media market sizes are determined by Nielsen for radio and television.

- Radio Small Market: local radio stations located in markets 50+
- Radio Large Market: local radio stations located in markets 1–50
- Television Small Market: local TV stations located in markets 50+
- Television Large Market: local TV stations located in markets 1–50
- Network Radio: A radio network, syndication service, or program service that programs to multiple markets.
- Network Television: A radio network, syndication service, or program service that programs to multiple markets.
- Small Digital News Organization: 2,499,999 or fewer unique visitors per month.
- Large Digital News Organization: 2,499,999 or more unique visitors per month.
- Student: Anyone enrolled in a high school, college or university in the United States, Canada or any other country.

== Categories ==
The RTDNA website lists the following categories for the Edward R. Murrow Awards.

- Overall Excellence: Entry consists of up to 40 minutes of examples of the previous year's news coverage and then a single newscast.
- Newscast: One regularly scheduled newscast from the previous year.
- Breaking News Coverage (Previously known as "Spot News"): Entry may consist of up to 20 minutes of examples of a station's coverage of a single, unscheduled news event.
- Continuing Coverage: Entry may consist of up to 30 minutes of examples showing continuing coverage of a major developing story over an extended period of time during the previous year.
- Feature Reporting: A single report of up to 10 minutes covering a human-interest or profile subject that is not breaking news or investigative in nature.
- Investigative Reporting: Entry may consist of up to 15 minutes of examples of journalistic enterprise on an important issue.
- News Documentary: Up to 60 minutes of coverage of a single subject reported in a single segment addressing a need or needs in the station's market.
- News Series: Coverage of a single subject reported in multiple parts, not to exceed 30 minutes.
- Hard News Reporting: A single hard news report of up to 10 minutes prepared for a newscast that is not breaking news or primarily investigative in nature.
- Sports Reporting: A single packaged report of up to 10 minutes covering a sports-related topic. Anchored segments or stand-alone sports programs and play-by-play are not eligible.
- Excellence in Sound (Formerly 'Use of Sound'): Up to 10 minutes of coverage of a single subject or single segment showing creative use of sound to tell a story.
- Excellence in Video (Formerly 'Use of Video'): An entry up to 10 minutes showing creative use of video to tell a story.
- Writing: Up to three examples from the previous year, not exceeding 15 minutes, that demonstrate excellence in writing that conveys the feeling and significance of events to the listener or viewer.
- Multimedia (Formerly 'Website'): Up to 15 examples of URLs, including the news organization's home page, which demonstrate exceptional news coverage and journalistic skill.
- Excellence in Innovation (new for 2017): Up to 30 minutes of audio or video coverage, or URLS, apps, social feeds, or any other platform that demonstrates an innovative use of content, engagement, technology and/or audience experience.
- Excellence in Social Media (new for 2017): Up to 10 examples of URLs, apps, or other platforms that demonstrate the exceptional use of social media as evidenced by the quality of journalism and the quantity and quality of user engagement.

== Noteworthy winners ==
The Edward R. Murrow Awards are presented to media organizations as a whole rather than to individual journalists. However, many categories are for single news reports done by individual journalists. Some of the prominent journalists responsible for stories that won Edward R. Murrow awards include Katie Couric, Diane Sawyer, Dan Rather, Tom Brokaw, Peter Jennings, Ted Koppel, Holly Williams, Keith Olbermann, Bryant Gumbel, Brian Williams, Michael Moss, Serena Altschul, Richard Engel, and Jeremy Young. Full lists of winners and organizations can be found on the RTDNA website.

== Student Murrow Awards ==
In 2015, the RTDNA added a student division to the Murrow Awards. Student Awards are awarded to the individuals or team of individuals that produce them, unlike the professional Murrow Awards, which are presented to a news organization.

The categories for student awards are:

- Excellence in Audio Newscast
- Excellence in Audio Reporting
- Excellence in Video Newscast
- Excellence in Video Reporting
- Excellence in Digital Reporting

In the reporting categories, entries should consist of a single piece, package or series. Newscast entries should consist of a complete newscast up to 30 minutes in length. Digital entries should include digital or multimedia elements, particularly interactive elements, and should not consist solely of audio, video, or text.

== Winners by year ==
RTDNA does not have a comprehensive online listing of all national and regional Edward R. Murrow Award winners since the awards' founding in 1971. Below are links redirecting to annual winners on Wikipedia pages or external links to RTDNA's website.

- 1997 Edward R. Murrow Awards (Radio Television Digital News Association)
- 1999 Edward R. Murrow Awards (Radio Television Digital News Association)
- 2003 National Edward R. Murrow Award Winners
- 2009 National Edward R. Murrow Award Winners
- 2009 Regional Edward R. Murrow Award Winners
- 2010 National Edward R. Murrow Award Winners
- 2010 Regional Edward R. Murrow Award Winners
- 2011 National Edward R. Murrow Award Winners
- 2011 Regional Edward R. Murrow Award Winners
- 2012 National Edward R. Murrow Award Winners
- 2012 Regional Edward R. Murrow Award Winners
- 2013 National Edward R. Murrow Award Winners
- 2013 Regional Edward R. Murrow Award Winners
- 2014 National Edward R. Murrow Award Winners
- 2014 Regional Edward R. Murrow Award Winners
- 2015 National Edward R. Murrow Award Winners
- 2015 Regional Edward R. Murrow Award Winners
- 2015 Student Edward R. Murrow Award Winners
- 2016 National Edward R. Murrow Award Winners
- 2016 Regional Edward R. Murrow Award Winners
- 2016 Student Edward R. Murrow Award Winners
- 2017 National Edward R. Murrow Award Winners
- 2017 Regional Edward R. Murrow Award Winners
- 2017 Student Edward R. Murrow Award Winners
- 2018 Student Edward R. Murrow Award Winners
- 2018 National Edward R. Murrow Award Winners
- 2018 Regional Edward R. Murrow Award Winners
- 2019 Student Edward R. Murrow Award Winners
- 2019 National Edward R. Murrow Award Winners
- 2019 Regional Edward R. Murrow Award Winners
- 2020 Student Edward R. Murrow Award Winners
- 2020 National Edward R. Murrow Award Winners
- 2020 Regional Edward R. Murrow Award Winners
- 2021 Student Edward R. Murrow Award Winners
- 2021 National Edward R. Murrow Award Winners
- 2021 Regional Edward R. Murrow Award Winners
- 2022 Student Edward R. Murrow Award Winners
- 2022 National Edward R. Murrow Award Winners
- 2022 Regional Edward R. Murrow Award Winners
- 2023 Student Edward R. Murrow Award Winners
- 2023 National Edward R. Murrow Award Winners
- 2023 Regional Edward R. Murrow Award Winners
- 2024 Student Edward R. Murrow Award Winners
- 2024 National Edward R. Murrow Award Winners
- 2024 Regional Edward R. Murrow Award Winners

== See also ==
- List of American television awards
- Edward R. Murrow
