= Jack Snow (writer) =

American writer

- Born: August 15, 1907; Piqua, Ohio
- Died: July 11, 1956 (aged 48); New York City
- Resting place: Forest Hill Cemetery, Piqua, Ohio
- Writing career
- Genres: science fiction; fantasy
- Notable work: The Magical Mimics in Oz; The Shaggy Man of Oz

John Frederick Snow (August 15, 1907 – July 13, 1956), born Piqua, Ohio was an American radio writer, writer of ghost stories, and scholar, primarily of the works of L. Frank Baum. When Baum died in 1919, the twelve-year-old Snow offered to be the next Royal Historian of Oz, but was turned down by a staffer at Baum's publisher, Reilly & Lee. Snow eventually wrote two Oz books: The Magical Mimics in Oz (1946) and The Shaggy Man of Oz (1949), as well as Who's Who in Oz (1954), a guide to the Oz characters, all of which Reilly & Lee published.

== Profile ==
In his second year in high school, the Snow created the first radio review column in American journalism, in The Cincinnati Enquirer. After graduation, Snow pursued a career in print journalism and primarily in radio, with periods in teachers college and the U. S. Army. He named the Ohio radio station WING, and spent seven years with the National Broadcasting Company in New York. In 1944, he attempted to get NBC to produce a radio series based on the stories of fellow Weird Tales author Ray Bradbury.

Snow published five stories in Weird Tales over the space of two decades:

- "Night Wings" (September 1927)
- "Poison" (December 1928)
- "Second Childhood" (March 1945)
- "Seed" (January 1946)
- "Midnight" (May 1946)

With the except of "Second Childhood", these were included in a collection entitled Dark Music and Other Spectral Tales (1947) . A full description of each tale in the collection appears in the entry on Snow in E.F. Bleiler's Guide to Supernatural Fiction Snow also published several letters in the letters column of Weird Tales over the years.

"Seed" was republished in the 1988 anthology Weird Tales: The Magazine That Never Dies, edited by Marvin Kaye.

When Snow assembled his 1947 collection Dark Music he wanted it to include a dozen of his best stories, including one of his more sinister tales, “Midnight,” which had appeared in the May 1946 issue of Weird Tales alongside Bradbury's story "The Smiling People." Later, Bradbury agreed to write the foreword for the volume, but the publisher insisted on padding the volume with a number of Snow's stories that were juvenilia. Bradbury, only twenty-six years old at the time, had agreed to write a foreword for Snow's collection but reneged when he read these additions, rejecting them as "patently unpublishable". It has been rumored that the jackets for all copies of Jack Snow's book, Dark Music and Other Spectral Tales, (whose cover art is by Ronald Clyne – his first published book jacket) had to be overstamped with a bar of ink, to block out Bradbury's name, but no copy has ever surfaced with such a bar of ink. Snow wrote to Bradbury "You are a literary craftsman with ambitions to become a skilled and recognized artist in the field. I have no such ambitions. I want to write because I enjoy it."

A short story entitled "A Murder in Oz" was submitted to Ellery Queen's Mystery Magazine, but the editors rejected it,. It was posthumously published in The Baum Bugle. That story has been published in a recent collection titled Spectral Snow: The Dark Fantasies of Jack Snow (Hungry Tiger Press, 1996), with a cover by Eric Shanower. There is much overlap between Snow's two collections but each contains stories not found in the other.

Anthony Boucher praised Who's Who in Oz for its comprehensive set of character sketches, plot synopses, biographical notes, and "skilled discussion of many arguable points in the chronology and history of Oz".

There have been rumors over the years of a third unpublished Oz book by Snow, entitled Over the Rainbow to Oz (involving either Polychrome, the rainbow's daughter, or an early history of Oz), but no manuscript has ever been discovered.

Snow's address book of Oz fans, discovered after he died, became the basis of the mailing that established The International Wizard of Oz Club.

The Baum Bugle winter 1987 issue contains biographical and bibliographical information about Snow as well as critical analysis of his horror output.

An entry on the movie website IMDb indicates that he died in New York of internal hemorrhaging and is buried in Forest Hill Cemetery, Piqua, Ohio (his birthplace), next to his father, John Alonzo Snow. Both father and son are buried in lot 021 001.
