= Jonathan Gregg =

American singer-songwriter (born 1955)

- Born: January 26, 1955 (age 71); New York City, United States
- Genres: Pop, Americana, rock 'n' roll, ambient country
- Occupation: Musician/songwriter
- Instruments: Guitar, pedal steel, dobro. vocals
- Years active: 1976–present
- Labels: Northern Spy; Portable; Fake Doom; JAGDISC; SAM records
- Website: www.jagtunes.com

Jonathan Gregg (born January 26, 1955) is an American singer, songwriter, and multi-instrumentalist who plays pedal steel, guitar, and dobro. Based in New York City, he is a founding member of ambient country pioneers SUSS; he also led Jonathan Gregg & the Lonesome Debonaires and The Combine, and, with Kevin Johnson, co-led alt-country band The Linemen.

== Early life ==
Jonathan Gregg was born and raised in New York City, where he lived until the age of 14, when his family moved upstate to Poughkeepsie, NY. He attended Deerfield Academy in Deerfield, Massachusetts, and in 1977 graduated from Brown University with a degree in French. He returned to New York in 1981.

== Career ==
=== 1979–1984 ===
Gregg led two bands in college, the Lonesome Debonaires and Guns Galore, the latter of which included saxophonist Ken Field. In 1979, he joined the New Wave band the Mundanes, led by bandleader/guitarist/songwriter John Andrews (who went on to work in animation, notably as an executive producer of Beavis & Butt-Head). The Mundanes also included keyboardist John Linnell, who went on to form They Might Be Giants with John Flansburgh. The band won the first WBRU Rock Hunt in 1980 and released an indie single that charted on WBCN. They played throughout New England, opening for artists including the Ramones, Talking Heads, Joe Jackson and the B-52's, and appeared on Boston's WGBH-TV.

In 1981, the Mundanes moved to New York, at which point Linnell and drummer Kevin Tooley left the band, and Gregg began to take on a more prominent songwriting role. The band recorded a demo produced by Mick Ronson (David Bowie, Lou Reed, Mott the Hoople) in 1982.

Gregg then played guitar with various groups, including The Egyptians, who were managed by CBGB owner Hilly Kristal and opened for Spinal Tap; Lonesome Val, winner of the Musician best song contest in 1985; and Life in a Blender, whose first album was produced by Chris Butler of The Waitresses.

=== 1984–2000 ===
In 1984 Gregg formed a new version of Jonathan Gregg & the Lonesome Debonaires that included John Linnell on accordion before settling on a permanent lineup of Michael McMahon (guitar), Chris Smylie (bass) and Ken Meyer (drums, later succeeded by Stan Mitchell and Nat Seeley).

Jonathan Gregg & the Lonesome Debonaires released their first album, Blue on Blonde, in 1992, on the JAGDISC label. Described as "clever and intellectual," the album was a critical success. Rolling Stone compared Gregg to Dave Edmunds and Albert Lee and called him a "triple threat" based on his guitar playing, singing and songwriting. Stereo Review Magazine compared the band to Dire Straits, and Gregg to John Hiatt and Tom Verlaine of Television. Allmusic compared Gregg to Richard Thompson of Fairport Convention and Elvis Costello. The band toured with They Might Be Giants and appeared on Vin Scelsa’s radio show, Idiot's Delight.

Two other well-received releases ensued, Unconditional in 1994 and The Hardest Goodbye in 1998, but Chris Smylie was offered the bass chair for the Broadway musical The Full Monty (with songs by Gregg's and Smylie's Brown classmate David Yazbek) and it was decided that the band had run its course. They played their last show in March 2000.

=== 2000–present ===
In 2000, Gregg decided to focus full-time on pedal steel guitar. He made a pilgrimage to Nashville to study with the late Jeff Newman, and has since played frequently as a session musician and sideman, most notably as a longtime member of The Doc Marshalls (now Runner of the Woods). Gregg filmed a series of pedal steel instructional videos for Howcast, leading to over 100,000 hits worldwide through Howcast site and its distributed videos on YouTube. In 2020, he was featured in a profile of six modern pedal steel players on Reverb.com. He currently gives lessons from his New York apartment. He has also performed onstage and/or recorded with Eric Lindell, Bob Woodruff (singer), Eric Brace and Last Train Home, Jesse Malin, Jim Petrie, Emily Duff and Cliff Westfall.

In 2011, he formed an instrumental group, The Combine, with veteran New York musicians Josh Kaufman (producer and guitarist on Bob Weir’s 2016 comeback album Blue Mountain, guitarist for Josh Ritter), drummer Brian Kantor (Nina Persson, Fruit Bats) and bassist Terence Murren (Bobby Previte). He also started playing dobro with bluegrass ensemble The Crusty Gentlemen.

In 2013, Gregg teamed up with Kevin Royal Johnson to form a new version of The Linemen, with D.C. veterans Antoine Sanfuentes, Scott McKnight and Bill Williams. Johnson and Gregg knew each other since the '90s, when their bands shared bills. Their first — and only — album, titled Close the Place Down, featured songs written by Johnson and Gregg, individually and together, with both as featured vocalists. The record was released in 2016 and rose to Number 50 on the Americana (music) charts. It was recorded at Brooklyn Recording Studios by Andy Taub (Keith Richards, Calexico, Yo La Tengo) and mixed by producer/engineer John Alagia (John Mayer, Dave Matthews, Liz Phair. Johnson and Gregg were featured in a 2016 interview by No Depression regarding the making of the record. The band broke up in 2017 when Johnson decided to retire from music to devote himself to his rare-book business full time.

In 2016, Gregg joined Bob Holmes, Pat Irwin, Gary Leib and William Garrett in an ambient country project called SUSS . Their first album, "Ghost Box," was released in January 2018, and was met with critical acclaim, leading to a contract with Brooklyn-based Northern Spy Records. Two other Northern Spy releases followed, High Line (2019) and Promise (2020), which both appeared in best-of lists for their respective years.

== Discography ==
=== As bandleader or co-leader ===
With Jonathan Gregg & the Lonesome Debonaires

- Blue on Blonde (1992) – on JAGDISC
- Unconditional (1994) – on JAGDISC
- The Hardest Goodbye (1998) – on JAGDISC

With The Linemen

- Close the Place Down (2016) – on SAM Records

=== As band member/sideman/session player ===
With The Mundanes

- Make It the Same 3-song EP (1980) – on Portable

Life in a Blender

- Welcome to the Jelly Days (1986) – on Fake Doom Records

Kevin Johnson

- Sunday Driver (2000)

Chris Rael

- The Devil You Know (2004)

Edward Rogers

- You Haven't Been Where I've Been (2004)

The Doc Marshalls

- Honest for Once (2008)
- Look Out Compadre (2010)

Deena

- Somewhere in Blue (2008)
- Rock River (2014)

Arty Hill

- Another Lost Highway (2011)

Mark Cutler

- Sweet Pain (2012)

Runner of the Woods

- Thirsty Valley (2014)

George Usher

- The Last Day of Winter (2015)

Jim Petrie

- Perfect on Paper (2017)

Emily Duff

- Maybe in the Morning (2017)

SUSS

- Ghost Box 2018
- Ghost Box (Expanded) – on Northern Spy (2018)
- High Line – on Northern Spy (2019)
- Promise – on Northern Spy (2020)
