= Arty Hill =

American singer-songwriter

- Origin: Cambridge, Maryland, United States
- Genres: Country
- Occupation: singer-songwriter
- Years active: 2003–present
- Label: Various
- Website: www.artyhill.com

Arty Hill is an American country music singer-songwriter of the Honky-tonk tradition. His work has been covered by several artists including Jason & the Scorchers and the Kenny and Amanda Smith Band.

== Discography ==
=== Albums ===
- Baltimore Reasons, 2003
- Back on the Rail, 2005
- Bar of Gold, 2008 (Cow Island Music)
- Back on the Rail: reissue, 2009 (Cow Island Music)
- Montgomery on My Mind: The Hank EP, 2009 (Cow Island Music)
- Pie for Breakfast: Riffs, Roughs, and Radio, 2010
- Another Lost Highway, 2010 (featuring Jonathan Gregg and Dave Giegerich of The Linemen)
- Heart on my Dirty Sleeve, 2014
- Live: Church on Saturday Night, 2016
- A Thousand Smoky Nights, 2021
