= The International Wizard of Oz Club =

Literary organization

The International Wizard of Oz Club, Inc., was founded during 1957 by Justin G. Schiller, a then thirteen-year-old boy. The sixteen charter members were garnered from the mailing list found among the papers of the recently deceased Jack Snow, with whom Schiller and the others had discussed the work of L. Frank Baum.

The organization today has hundreds of members from all over the world, including children, adults who were alive when the books were still being published annually, ardent Baumists, Oz collectors, and those interested primarily in the classic 1939 MGM movie.

The society's major publication, The Baum Bugle, began with Schiller duplicating issues on his parents' mimeograph machine. It is now published three times a year and has been recognized as a scholarly journal by the Modern Language Association since 1983. It has reached 202 issues as of Spring 2025, and its issues have more than doubled in size over the years, typically running to forty-eight pages plus full-color covers.

Oz Club members originally organized three major conventions a year in the United States (Munchkin (east), Winkie (west), and Ozmopolitan (central). The self-supporting events attracted members in that region of the country. Arriving with car loads of decorations, props, costumes, auction contributions and show-and-tell materials, attendees immersed themselves in a weekend of Ozzy camaraderie. The Convention names usually reflected geographical locations or citizens identified in the Oz books. There are also smaller gatherings, most frequently South Winkie, Oogaboo Rendezvous, Quadling, and Gillikin, or Ozcanabans. The last group met in the banquet hall of a restaurant in Escanaba, Michigan, home of Fred M. Meyer, a founding member who served for decades as the club's secretary. Meyer also mailed out an annual Christmas card to all members each year, often with ideas for new Oz books, until his health put him at emeritus status that lasted to the end of his life. As large public Oz festivals grew in popularity, IWOC conventions in the Midwest and East Coast lost much of their support base; fans found the guest speakers attractive and the flexible accommodations more affordable. The Ozmopolitan and Munchkin conventions could not be sustained, although the Winkie Convention, re-branded as OzCon International, remains a robust, vibrant fan event attracting attendees from around the world.

Beginning in 2008, the Oz Club began to hold conventions with programs designed to appeal more broadly to the general public. They are frequently tied to geographic sites of special interest to Oz fans giving members a chance to visit these locations as a group. Information about all the conventions can be found at ozclub.org.

Notable members of the Club past and present have included Ray Bradbury, Willard Carroll, Martha Coolidge, Rachel Cosgrove Payes, Martin Gardner, Margaret Hamilton, Michael Patrick Hearn, Eloise Jarvis McGraw, Bronson Pinchot (who organized conventions in the 1970s), Edward Wagenknecht, Eric Shanower, John Fricke, and Meinhardt Raabe. Frank Joslyn Baum was appointed the club's first president. Robert Allison Baum Jr., a great-grandson of the author, currently serves on the board of directors.

The club has published many of Baum's rarer books, including Animal Fairy Tales, Aunt Jane's Nieces, and Twinkle and Chubbins. It published two Oz books by Ruth Plumly Thompson and one each by Rachel Cosgrove and the team of Eloise Jarvis McGraw and Lauren Lynn McGraw. In 2000, it put out its first new Oz book not linked to the original series: Gina Wickwar's The Hidden Prince of Oz, with illustrations by Anna-Maria Cool. A Wickwar/Cool sequel followed in 2007, Toto of Oz. That same year it published The Collected Short Stories of L. Frank Baum. In addition, the Club has published a set of color-printed maps of The Marvelous Land of Oz and Countries Surrounding the Land of Oz, as well as new editions of short stories by L. Frank Baum and Ruth Plumly Thompson. Its best-selling publication is Bibliographia Oziana by Douglas G. Greene and Peter E. Hanff, which provides bibliographical descriptions of the original Oz series.

The Club owns a small but fine collection of original artwork and archival materials.
