= The Baum Bugle =

- Discipline: Literature
- Language: English

Publication details
- History: 1957 to present
- Publisher: The International Wizard of Oz Club (United States)
- Frequency: Triannual

Standard abbreviations
- ISO 4: Baum Bugle

Indexing
- ISSN: 0005-6677

Links
- Journal homepage

The Baum Bugle: A Journal of Oz is the official journal of The International Wizard of Oz Club. The journal was founded in 1957, with its first issue released in June of that year (to a subscribers' list of sixteen). It publishes three times per year, with issues dated Spring, Autumn, and Winter; Issue No. 1 of Volume 50 appeared in the Spring of 2006. The journal publishes both scholarly and popular articles on L. Frank Baum, the Oz books written by Baum and other writers, and related subjects. These regularly include researched historical pieces; interviews with authors, illustrators, and other creatives; pop culture appreciations; bibliographical analyses; plus reviews of Oz-related books, multimedia, films and theater productions, rare photographs and illustrations, and similar materials.

== Major writers and writing in The Baum Bugle ==
Across its extensive history, The Baum Bugle has included articles written by such notable figures as Ruth Berman, André De Shields, John Fricke, Martin Gardner, Douglas G. Greene, William Lindsay Gresham, Margaret Hamilton (actress), Michael Patrick Hearn, Phyllis Ann Karr, Gary Kurtz, March Laumer, Daniel P. Mannix, Dick Martin (artist), and Sally Roesch Wagner. Martin also designed all the cover art from 1959 to 1976.

In early decades The Baum Bugle was known for reprinting rare fiction by L. Frank Baum, including non-Oz stories from magazines and newspapers and installments of the 1904–05 Oz comic strip Queer Visitors from the Marvelous Land of Oz. During her lifetime, Ruth Plumly Thompson also contributed original poetry, and both Rachel Cosgrove Payes and Eloise Jarvis McGraw penned original articles.

Among the range of articles published in The Baum Bugle:

- "W. W. Denslow, The First Illustrator of Oz," by Douglas G. Greene, 1972 - a biographical article of the original Oz artist
- "The Radio Road to Oz," by John Fricke, 1986 - describing and summarizing each episode of the 1933 radio series
- "Jack Snow and the Land of Oz," by Peter E. Hanff, 1988 - detailing the author's life and career
- "Tale of a Parable," by Michael Gessel, 1992 - explaining the famous 'Parable on Populism' inaccurately propagated by many textbooks
- "L. Frank Baum, the Witches of Oz, and the Witches of Folklore" by Robert B. Luehrs, 1994 - examining Baum's witches in context
- "The Tik-Tok Man of Oz: The Fairyland Extravaganza of 1913-14," by Scott Cummings, 2014 - fully detailing the musical play
- "30 Beautiful Heads: Return to Oz Through a Disability Lens," by Coyote Shook, 2020 - analyzing the 1985 film

== "Bibliographia Oziana" and "Bibliographia Baumiana" ==
The Oz Club was established by collectors looking to compile and disseminate good and accurate information about the works of L. Frank Baum and his successors. To that end, one of the earliest and longest-running projects was "Bibliographia Oziana," a series of articles initiated by Dick Martin to bibliographically describe each edition and state of the forty Oz books. After a stuttering start, these were published between Christmas 1963 (The Wonderful Wizard of Oz) and Autumn 1968 (Merry-Go-Round in Oz).

In 1967, Martin moved on to initiate two other bibliographic series: "Bibliographia Baumiana," examining Baum's non-Oz works under his own name, and "Bibliographia Pseudonymiana," examining his pseudonymous works. These series were initiated in the Spring 1967(A New Wonderland/The Magical Monarch of Mo) and Winter 1968 (Annabel) issues, respectively. They continued into a more developed set of bibliographic descriptions up to Winter 2001. Several older articles were revisited and greatly expanded in the 1980s and 1990s, under the aegis of new authors, including James E. Haff, Peter E. Hanff, and Patrick Maund.

The success of these articles led to two seminal Oz Club publications, Bibliographia Baumiana (by Peter E. Hanff and Douglas G. Greene) and Bibliographia Baumiana (by W. Neal Thompson).

Beginning in the Spring 2008 issue, W. Neal Thompson has written bibliographical examinations of the works of major illustrators connected to Oz and Baum. These continue on an occasional basis under the name "Bibliographia Illustriana."

== Editors of The Baum Bugle ==
The Baum Bugle has been edited by a number of individual volunteers, some of whom were major figures within the Oz Club. These were not originally credited in the pages of the Bugle, although Justin G. Schiller is acknowledged as the original editor. Starting in 1968, an editorial team was credited. In 1975, Jerry Tobias become the first credited editor-in-chief, a role that has been filled to date as follows:

- 1975–77: Jerry Tobias
- 1977-78: David L. Greene
- 1978-79: James E. Haff and Dick Martin
- 1979–84: Barbara S. Koelle
- 1984–87: John Fricke
- 1988–92: Michael Gessel
- 1993–95: Lynne Smith
- 1996–2000: William Stillman
- 2001–04: Atticus Gannaway
- 2005–09: Sean P. Duffley
- 2009–12: Scott Cummings
- 2013–16: Craig Noble
- 2016: Scott Cummings
- 2017: John Fricke
- 2018–present: Sarah K. Crotzer

Four guest editors-in-chief have also led issues outside the usual run: Fred M. Meyer (Spring 1995); Marcus Mébès (Autumn 2008); Sean P. Duffley (Winter 2012); and Cynthia Twohy Ragni (Spring 2015).
