= Michael Patrick Hearn =

American literary critic

Michael Patrick Hearn is an American literary scholar as well as a man of letters specializing in children's literature and its illustration. His works include The Annotated Wizard of Oz (1973/2000), The Annotated Christmas Carol (1977/2003), and The Annotated Huckleberry Finn (2001). He considers the three most quintessential American novels to be Moby-Dick by Herman Melville, The Wonderful Wizard of Oz by L. Frank Baum, and The Adventures of Huckleberry Finn by Mark Twain.

He is an expert on L. Frank Baum and is currently writing a biography about him, which sets forth to correct the numerous errors in previous biographies, many based on Frank Joslyn Baum's out of print and largely mythological To Please a Child.

As an Oz and L. Frank Baum scholar, he also edited The Critical Heritage Edition of the Wizard of Oz for Schocken Books (1986), wrote the introduction to the first published version of the screenplay of The Wizard of Oz (1939 film). He appears in the documentaries Oz: the American Fairyland and Matilda Joslyn Gage (1983), credited as an "Authority on L. Frank Baum". He gave the keynote address at the Centennial convention of The Wonderful Wizard of Oz mounted by The International Wizard of Oz Club, and often makes public appearances in which he lectures on Baum.

Hearn was a student at Hamilton College in 1968-69 and then transferred to Bard College, where he graduated in 1972. At Hamilton, he was encouraged to become an author by one of his professors, Alex Haley. His first book, The Annotated Wizard of Oz, was completed when he was a student at Bard.

== Selected works ==
Other books as author or editor include:

- 50 years of Wanda Gág's Millions of Cats: 1928-1978 (1978)
- McLoughlin Brothers, publishers, 1828-1978 (1980)
- Victorian Fairy Tales (1980)
- Peter Newell, American Comic Illustrator (1983)
- The Chocolate Book: A Sampler for Boys and Girls (1983)
- The Best of the Andrew Lang Fairy Tale Book (1986)
- The Porcelain Cat (children's picture book, 1987)
- The Wizard of Oz: The Screenplay, (1989)
- W.W. Denslow: The Other Wizard of Oz, (1996)
- The Victorian Fairy Tale Book (1990)
- 65 years of Wanda Gág's Millions of Cats: 1928-1993 (1992)
- Native American Legends : Lakota (1995)
- Myth, Magic, and Mystery: One Hundred Years of American Children's Book Illustration (1996)
- From the Silver Age to Stalin: Russian Children's Book Illustration In preparation, (2008)

He has also written articles for Horn Book and The Baum Bugle and Liner Notes for Caedmon Records.
