= AB Bookman's Weekly =

American trade publication

- Cover of the October 27, 1986, issue
- Categories: Trade magazine
- Frequency: Weekly
- Founder: Sol. M. Malkin
- Founded: 1948
- Final issue: 1999
- Country: United States
- Based in: Newark, New Jersey
- Language: English
- ISSN: 0001-0340

AB Bookman's Weekly was a weekly trade publication begun in 1948 by Sol. M. Malkin as a publication of the R. R. Bowker Company, publisher of Books in Print and other book trade and library periodicals. In its glory days between the early 1950s and the early 1990s, AB was "the best marketplace for out-of-print books in North America." Nicholas Basbanes called it "the leading trade publication in the antiquarian world." In addition to publishing long lists of books wanted and for sale, it included trade news, reference lists, conference announcements, and various special features concerning the book trade, librarianship, and book collecting. The magazine was headquartered in Newark, New Jersey.

== Origins ==
The magazine began as a column in Publishers Weekly called "Antiquarian Bookseller"; in 1948, it spun off as a separate publication, at a time when there was a flourishing mail-order business in out-of-print and second-hand books. Malkin purchased the magazine from Bowker in 1953. It first appeared under its final title in 1967. For more than four decades, it was essential reading not only for used and rare booksellers, but also for acquisitions and rare book librarians, book collectors, as well as those interested in the history of books and printing. Malkin was assisted by his wife, Mary Ann O'Brian Malkin, universally known as "[mam]," whose interest in embroidery was reflected in her many AB reviews of needlework books. In 1972, when Sol. Malkin sold the magazine to Jacob L. Chernofsky, AB Bookman's Weekly had a subscription list of more than 10,000 subscribers. In 1985, an annual lecture in bibliography was established in Sol. M. Malkin's honor at Columbia University's School of Library Service. Sol. M. Malkin died in 1986. In 1992, the Malkin Lecture site moved with Rare Book School to the University of Virginia, where it continues as the annual Sol. M. and Mary Ann O'Brian Lecture in Bibliography.

== Spin-offs ==
In December 1977, Chernofsky and Margaret Knox Goggin, dean of the University of Denver's School of Librarianship, organized a seminar on used and antiquarian books, aimed at booksellers and librarians. The Workshop/Seminar in the Out-of-Print and Antiquarian Book Market (the eventual title of the seminar) became an annual event in 1979; in 2008 (as the Colorado Antiquarian Book Seminar), the seminar celebrated its 30th anniversary.

== Decline ==
Under Chernofsky's direction, AB Bookman's Weekly flourished into the early 1990s, but it began to falter because of competition from online listings of used and rare books. AB Bookman's Weekly ceased publication at the end of 1999. Efforts by Publishers Weekly to revive it as an Internet online magazine in 2004 were unsuccessful.

== See also ==
- Books in the United States
