= Frank Kramer (footballer, born 1947) =

Dutch footballer (1947–2020)

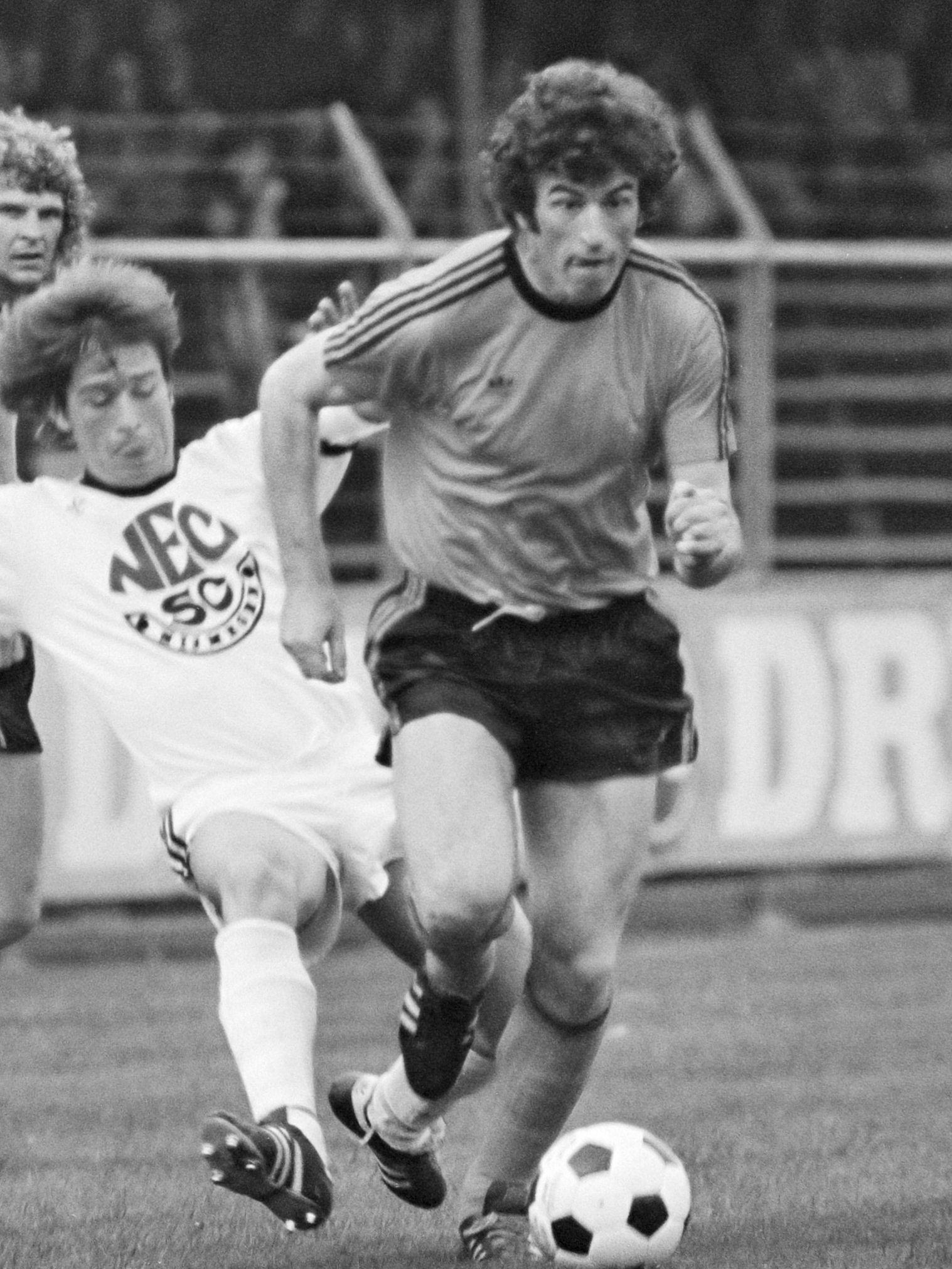
- Kramer in 1978

Personal information
- Full name: Franciscus Johannes Erik Kramer
- Date of birth: 27 November 1947
- Place of birth: Amsterdam, Netherlands
- Date of death: 1 December 2020 (aged 73)
- Place of death: Amsterdam, Netherlands
- Position: Winger

Youth career
- RKAVIC

Senior career*
Years	Team	Apps	(Gls)
1970–1972	Blauw Wit		
1972–1974	FC Amsterdam	27	(3)
1973–1974	→ MVV (loan)	19	(2)
1975–1977	Telstar	57	(8)
1977–1979	Volendam	67	(13)
1979–1980	Haarlem	27	(5)
1980–1981	Telstar		
1981–1984	Volendam		
- * Club domestic league appearances and goals

Frank Kramer (27 November 1947 – 1 December 2020) was a Dutch footballer who played as a striker, TV presenter and football commentator.

== Club career ==
Born in Amsterdam as the youngest in a family of seven children, the curly-haired Kramer played for hometown side Blauw Wit and moved to the newly-formed FC Amsterdam in 1972. In the 1973/74 season he was sent on loan to MVV but did not want to return to FC Amsterdam after a feud with manager Pim van de Meent. In 1975 he joined Telstar and then FC Volendam. He made his debut for Volendam on 14 August 1977 against AZ'67 and scored 27 goals in 98 league matches in two spells for them. He went on to play for Haarlem and Telstar again before finishing his career at Volendam.

Kramer scored 23 goals in 126 Eredivisie matches. A colourful figure, Kramer once showed the Ajax supporters his bare buttocks after being constantly mocked by them.

== Television ==
During his playing career, he also worked as a flight attendant for Lufthansa and was a German language teacher. In 1977 he started a television career which took him from presenting AVRO's Sportpanorama and Sterrenslag to De Frank Kramer Show, Hints and Boggle. He worked as a commentator for Eurosport from 1994 through 2018, reporting on the Africa Nations Cup and Major League Soccer matches among others.

== Personal life ==
He lost his sister and his girlfriend at a young age. In the 1970s, Kramer was in a relationship with musician Judy Schomper. From 1997 he was with his wife Mira de Vries.

Kramer got ill on his 73rd birthday and fell in a coma. He died four days later.
