= 1999 Edward R. Murrow Awards (Radio Television Digital News Association) =

The 1999 Edward R. Murrow Awards were presented by the Radio-Television News Directors Association (RTNDA), now renamed the Radio Television Digital News Association (RTDNA) in recognition of what the association terms "outstanding achievements in electronic journalism". National winners were selected from a pool of regional award winners. Below are the 1999 national award winners, which recognizes coverage that aired during the previous 1998 calendar year.

Categories that are not listed either had no entrants or the entries received were not deemed worthy of the award. The category currently called Breaking News was called "Spot News Coverage" in 1999, so the lists below have been edited to read Breaking/Spot News to avoid any confusion.

The information on this page was retrieved using the Archive.org Internet Wayback Machine to access the now defunct website for RTNDA.org, a domain that was abandoned when the organization was renamed RTDNA.

== 1999 National Edward R. Murrow Award Winners ==
=== Local Radio Small Market ===
- Overall Excellence: WATD-FM, Marshfield, MA
- Newscast: WZZK Radio, Birmingham, AL
- Breaking/Spot News Coverage: WZZK Radio, Birmingham, AL, "Tornado"
- Continuing Coverage: WWUS-FM, Big Pine Key, FL, "A Radio Lifeline for the Florida Keys During Hurricane Georges"
- Feature Reporting: WKSU-FM, Kent, OH, "Barberton Polka Party"
- Sports Reporting: WKSU-FM, Kent, OH, "High School PSLs"
- News Series: WNOX-AM/FM, Knoxville, TN, "Deadly Decision"
- News Documentary: WFSU-FM, Tallahassee, FL, "Pitts & Lee: The Million Dollar Murder"
- Use of Sound: KOMC-AM/KRZK-FM, Branson, MO, "Remember the 1998 Veterans Homecoming Celebration
- Writing: WATD-FM, Marshfield, MA

=== Local Radio Large Market ===
- Overall Excellence: KTAR-AM, Phoenix
- Newscast: KTAR-AM, Phoenix
- Breaking/Spot News Coverage: WTOP-AM/FM, Washington, "Capitol Hill Shooting"
- Continuing Coverage: KTRH NewsRadio, Houston, "Karla Faye Tucker Execution"
- Investigative Reporting: WBAL-AM, Baltimore, "You Have the Look..."
- Feature Reporting: WBAP, Dallas, "Nicaragua: After Hurricane Mitch"
- Sports Reporting: WBAL-AM, Baltimore, "Billiard Babes"
- News Series: KTAR-AM, Phoenix, "Road Rage"
- News Documentary: KPLU, Seattle, "The Whale Hunt"
- Use of Sound: KOA Radio, Denver, "Hearing Christmas for the First Time"
- Writing: WBZ, Boston

=== Local Television Small Market ===
- Overall Excellence: KAKE-TV, Wichita, KS
- Newscast: WTLV-TV, Jacksonville, FL
- Breaking/Spot News Coverage: WTLV-TV, Jacksonville, FL, "Fires of ’98"
- Continuing Coverage: WJXT-TV, Jacksonville, FL, "The Search for Maddie"
- Investigative Reporting: KKTV, Colorado Springs, CO, "Cancer Con"
- Feature Reporting: KFSN-TV, Fresno, CA, "Logging"
- Sports Reporting: KOLR-TV, Springfield, MO, "Little Bears Fan"
- News Series: KOTV, Tulsa, OK, "Come Home Again"
- News Documentary: WANE-TV, Fort Wayne, IN, "Christopher"
- Use of Video: KOTV, Tulsa, OK, "Navajo Life"

=== Local Television Large Market ===
- Overall Excellence: WWOR-TV, New York
- Newscast: KMBC-TV, Kansas City, MO
- Breaking/Spot News Coverage: KWTV, Oklahoma City, "Tornado Moves Through Oklahoma City"
- Continuing Coverage: WBZ-TV, Boston, "Campaign ’98"
- Investigative Reporting: KTVX-TV, Salt Lake City, "Olympics Bribery Scandal"
- Feature Reporting: KARE-TV, Minneapolis, "Home for Baby Loon"
- Sports Reporting: KDFW-TV, Dallas, "Running into Friends"
- News Series: KCBS-TV, Los Angeles, "Taken for a Ride"
- News Documentary: WXYZ-TV, Detroit, "Impact: Sterilized by the State"
- Use of Video: WBFF-TV, Baltimore, "Where Legends Grow"
- Writing: WUSA-TV, Washington

=== Network Radio ===
- Overall Excellence: ABC News Radio, New York
- Newscast: CBS Radio News, New York
- Breaking/Spot News Coverage: CBS Radio News, New York, "African Embassy Bombings"
- Continuing Coverage: ABC News Radio, New York, "Crisis in the White House"
- Feature Reporting: NPR, Douglas, AK, "Dora Photo Collection"
- News Series: ABC News Radio, New York, "Your World Wednesday"
- News Documentary: On the Job Productions, Silver Spring, MD, "Scenes from a Transplant"
- Writing: CBS Radio News, New York

=== Network Television ===
- Overall Excellence: NBC News, New York
- Newscast: ABC News World News Tonight Saturday, New York, "Impeachment Day"
- Breaking/Spot News Coverage: Television Broadcasts Limited, Hong Kong, "Sinking of Diaoyu Islands"
- Continuing Coverage: ABC News, New York, "Investigating the President"
- Investigative Reporting: Dateline NBC, New York, "NYPD Blues?"
- Feature Reporting: Dateline NBC, New York, "Save the Titanic"
- Sports Reporting: Dateline NBC, New York, "Hoop Dreams"
- News Series: Dateline NBC, New York, "Crossing the Line?"
- News Documentary: ABC News 20/20, New York, "Roy Smith’s America"
- Use of Video: Dateline NBC, New York, "Just Do It"
- Writing: NBC News Today Show, New York

== See also ==
- Edward R. Murrow
