= John Fricke =

Historian and author

- Born: 30 November 1950 (age 75); Milwaukee, Wisconsin, U.S.

John Fricke (born November 30, 1950) is a historian and author focusing on The Wizard of Oz and Judy Garland.

Fricke was born and raised in Milwaukee, Wisconsin, where he attended John Marshall High School and worked in advertising at the Melody Top Theater. He majored in Journalism at Northwestern University. Fricke appeared in the 2007 documentary Return To Oz: The Joy That Got Away.

In late 2008 and early 2010, Fricke picked out songs selections and archival film material for the traveling Judy Garland in Concert where live performances were projected on huge screens as Boston Pops and many other state orchestras cued up music to her legendary voice. Fricke co-authored a coffee table book, The Wizard of Oz: An Illustrated Companion to the Timeless Classic, with Jonathan Shirshekan, printed and released in 2009.

== List of audio commentaries ==
- Babes in Arms
- Easter Parade, with actor Fred Astaire's daughter Ava Astaire McKenzie
- For Me and My Gal
- Girl Crazy
- Meet Me in St. Louis, with actress Margaret O'Brien, composer Hugh Martin, screenwriter Irving Brecher, and producer Arthur Freed's daughter Barbara Freed-Saltzman
- The Pirate
- The Wizard of Oz, with other participants
