= The Krofft Superstar Hour =

- Starring: Bay City Rollers; Billy Barty; Billie Hayes; Jay Robinson; Louise DuArt; Paul Gale; Van Snowden
- Voices of: Lennie Weinrib; Walker Edmiston
- Country of origin: United States
- No. of episodes: 13

Production
- Producer: Sid and Marty Krofft
- Running time: 60 minutes

Original release
- Network: NBC
- Release: September 9, 1978 – January 27, 1979

Related
- The Krofft Supershow; Shang-a-Lang

The Krofft Superstar Hour is a Saturday morning children's variety show, produced by Sid and Marty Krofft. After eight episodes, the show was renamed The Bay City Rollers Show. It aired for one season from September 9, 1978 to January 27, 1979 on NBC. NBC also ran other repeat Krofft shows in an unrelated umbrella titled slot, Krofft Superstars, from 1978 to 1985.

== Background ==
The show is essentially a reworking of The Krofft Supershow, replacing the fictitious band "Kaptain Kool and the Kongs" with the real life Bay City Rollers. Just as on the previous show, the Rollers would perform comedy skits and musical numbers, and introduce the live action segments. The Bay City Rollers' segment also featured a character called Mr. Munchy in the main segment.

The regular live-action segments were "Horror Hotel" and "The Lost Island". Also included were reruns of "Magic Mongo" from the original Supershow. The show was cut back to 30 minutes after it was renamed The Bay City Rollers Show, and "The Lost Island" and "Magic Mongo" were dropped. The skits with the Rollers generally featured cameos by characters from other Sid and Marty Krofft shows, including Enik and the Sleestak from Land of the Lost, various characters from H. R. Pufnstuf, and Dr. Shrinker (now renamed Dr. Deathray) and his assistant Hugo (now renamed Otto).

== Segments ==
=== Horror Hotel ===
Despite the title, "Horror Hotel" was a comedy. It featured Wilhelmina W. Witchiepoo of H.R. Pufnstuf fame running the eponymous hotel. She was assisted by other H. R. Pufnstuf characters: Dr. Blinky, Seymour the Spider, Orson the Vulture and Stupid Bat. Horatio J. HooDoo from Lidsville was a permanent resident in the hotel and would bear the brunt of Horror Hotel's antics.

=== The Lost Island ===
"The Lost Island" also featured a number of characters from other Krofft shows on the Lost Island within the Bermuda Triangle. Stories would somehow combine H.R. Pufnstuf, Sigmund the Sea Monster, Weenie the Genie from Lidsville, a new character named Barbie, and other unlikely characters into one storyline while they stay one step ahead of Dr. Deathray and his henchman Otto. Enik from Land of the Lost was the King of the Sleestak who lived within the Lost City and the Lost Island was also inhabited by dragons (utilizing stop-motion footage of Grumpy and Big Alice from "Land of the Lost"). The good guys would often turn to the Island Spirit for advice on how to handle whatever plight they had ended up in.

== Cast ==
- Bay City Rollers (Eric Faulkner, Derek Longmuir, Alan Longmuir, Leslie McKeown, Stuart 'Woody' Wood) – Themselves
- Sharon Baird – Various Characters
- Patty Maloney – Various Characters
- Billy Barty – Otto, Sigmund the Sea Monster
- Louise DuArt – Barbie, Nashville, Various Characters
- Paul Gale – Horatio J. Hoodoo, Various Characters
- Billie Hayes – Wilhelmina W. Witchiepoo, Weenie the Genie
- Mickey McMeel – Turkey, Various Characters
- Jay Robinson – Dr. Deathray, Various Characters
- Van Snowden – Mr. Munchy, Various Characters

=== Voice cast ===
- Lennie Weinrib – H.R. Pufnstuf, Orson Vulture, Stupid Bat
- Walker Edmiston – Dr. Blinky, Enik, Seymour Spider, Sigmund
