= Sigmund and the Sea Monsters =

American children's TV series (1973–75)

- Starring: Billy Barty; Johnny Whitaker; Scott Kolden; Mary Wickes; Joe Higgins; Rip Taylor; Fran Ryan; Fred Spencer; Paul Gale; Van Snowden; Sharon Baird; Sparky Marcus; Margaret Hamilton
- Voices of: Walker Edmiston; Sidney Miller
- Country of origin: United States
- No. of seasons: 3
- No. of episodes: 29

Production
- Producer: Sid and Marty Krofft
- Running time: 25 minutes (per episode)
- Production companies: Sid and Marty Krofft Television Productions

Original release
- Network: NBC
- Release: September 8, 1973 – October 18, 1975

Sigmund and the Sea Monsters is an American children's television series that ran from September 8, 1973, to October 18, 1975, produced by Sid and Marty Krofft and aired on Saturday mornings. It was syndicated by itself from December 1975 to June 1978 and later as part of the Krofft Superstars show from 1978 to 1985.

The episodes included songs as part of the plot development. The character(s), generally Johnny, would sing a song about what he was thinking or feeling about something going on in his life, from things that made him happy to anxiety about girls.

While videotaping the first episode of Season Two, a hot light fell and started a fire. No one was injured, but the fire destroyed all of the sets and much of the costumes and other props. Most of Season Two was taped with minimal sets.

== Plot ==
The show centered on two brothers named Johnny and Scott Stuart. While playing on the beach near Dead Man's Point, the two of them discover a friendly young sea monster named Sigmund who had been thrown out by his comically dysfunctional undersea family for refusing to frighten people. The boys hide Sigmund in their clubhouse.

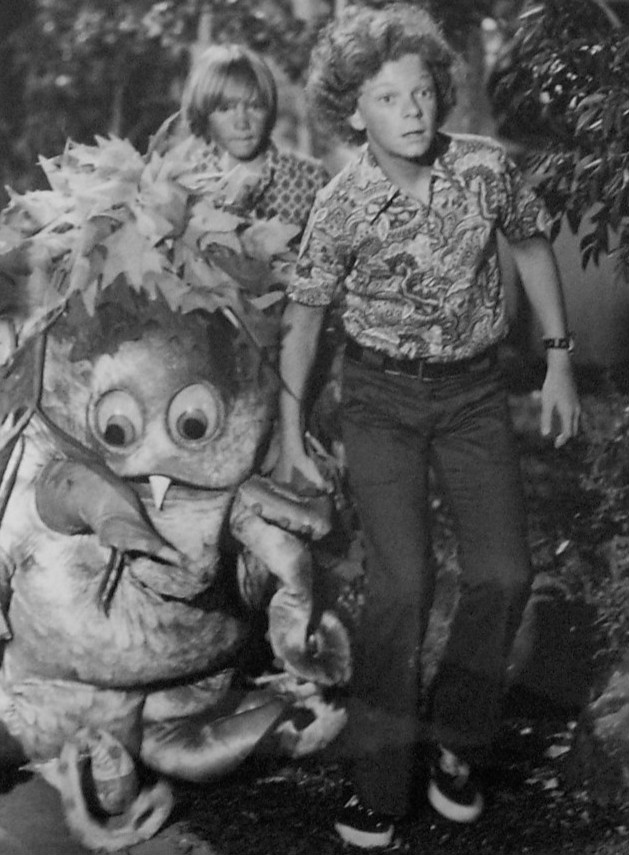
Sigmund, Scott and Johnny in the program's 1973 premiere episode, 1973

Plotlines were very simple and straightforward, usually some variation on the idea of Sigmund doing something silly to arouse attention, and the boys working to prevent him from being found by Sigmund's brothers Blurp and Slurp who want Sigmund to scare people in order to impress their parents Sweet Mama Ooze and Big Daddy Ooze. The brothers also worked to hide Sigmund from humans such as their overbearing housekeeper Zelda and Sheriff Chuck Bevans.

== Characters ==
=== Main characters ===
- Sigmund Ooze (performed by Billy Barty, voiced by Walker Edmiston) – A sea monster who was kicked out of his family for not being able to scare a human.
- Johnny and Scott Stuart (portrayed by Johnny Whitaker and Scott Kolden) – Two brothers who discovered Sigmund when they were playing at the beach

=== Ooze Family ===
The Ooze Family are a family of sea monsters that live out at Dead Man's Point. They kicked Sigmund out after he would not scare a human. Most episodes would have them trying to harm Johnny and Scott to no avail. The Ooze Family consists of:

- Sweet Mama Ooze (performed by Van Snowden, voiced by Sidney Miller) – The matriarch of the Ooze family. Sweet Mama's characterization was based loosely on Phyllis Diller.
- Big Daddy Ooze (performed by Joe A. Giamalva and Sharon Baird, voiced by Walker Edmiston) – The patriarch of the Ooze family. Big Daddy was a spoof of Archie Bunker from All in the Family. In the sixth episode of the first season, he is identified as "Melvin Ooze" by a tax collector.
- Blurp Ooze (performed by Larry Larsen, voiced by Walker Edmiston) – A brother of Sigmund.
- Slurp Ooze (performed by Paul Gale, voiced by Walker Edmiston) – A brother of Sigmund. Slurp's voice characterization was based loosely on that of the fictional character Gomer Pyle.
- Prince – The Ooze family's pet lobster who acts like the family dog.
- Uncle Siggy Ooze (performed by Sharon Baird, voiced by Walker Edmiston) – An Uncle of Sigmund.

=== Humans ===
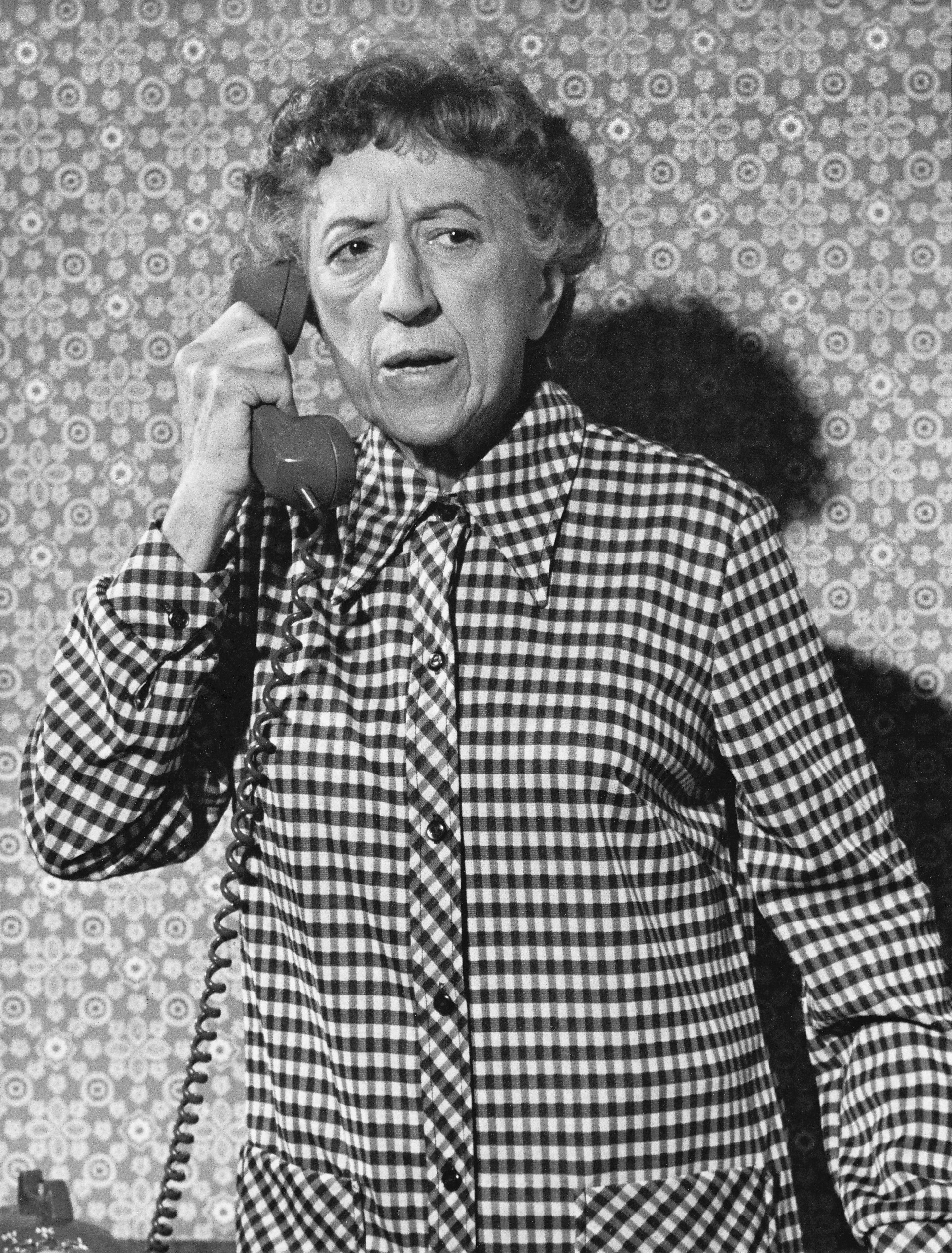
Publicity photo of Margaret Hamilton as Miss Eddels

- Zelda Marshall (portrayed by Mary Wickes) – The overbearing housekeeper who watches over Johnny and Scott.
- Chuck Bevans (portrayed by Joe Higgins) – The local sheriff.
- Gertrude Gooch (portrayed by Fran Ryan) – A housekeeper who replaced Zelda during the third season. Gertrude was a tough USMC drill instructor. The boys were relieved when Zelda returned.
- Miss Eddels (portrayed by Margaret Hamilton) – The elderly neighbor of Johnny and Scott.
- Peggy (portrayed by Pamelyn Ferdin)
- Leroy (portrayed by Stephen Ciccarelli)
- Jack Wild (portrayed by Himself) - The actor
- Paul Revere (portrayed by Bruce Hoy)

=== Other characters ===
- Sheldon (portrayed by Rip Taylor) – A magical "sea genie" who lives in a shell that debuted during the second season. Unfortunately, Sheldon was a bumbler and his "whammy" spells seldom worked properly.
- Shelby (portrayed by Sparky Marcus) – A sea genie who is Sheldon's nephew.
- Shelinor (portrayed by Peggy Mondo) – A sea genie who is Shelby's mother.
- Dr. Cyclops (portrayed by Walker Edmiston)
- H.R. Pufnstuf (voiced by Walker Edmiston)
- Dr. Blinky (voiced by Walker Edmiston)
- Ook (voiced by Walker Edmiston)
- Unkunk (voiced by Walker Edmiston)

== Music ==
The songs for the show were co-written by Danny Janssen, Bobby Hart and Wes Farrell.

A cover of the show's theme song, performed by Tripping Daisy, is included on the 1995 tribute album Saturday Morning: Cartoons' Greatest Hits, produced by Ralph Sall for MCA Records.

=== Album ===
Eleven songs from the show were released on Johnny Whitaker's album Friends (Music from the Television Series 'Sigmund and the Sea Monsters') (Chelsea Records, BCL1-0332).

All songs written by Danny Janssen and Bobby Hart, except where noted.

=== Side 1 ===
1. "Friends" (Janssen, Hart, Farrell)
2. "Keep It a Secret"
3. "A Simple Song"
4. "The Magician"
5. "Monster Rock" (Janssen, Hart, Farrell)
6. "It's Up to You"

=== Side 2 ===
1. "Can't Get You Off My Mind"
2. "Running 'Round in Circles"
3. "Lovin' Ain't Easy"
4. "Sigmund and the Sea Monsters"
5. "Day and Night"

== Production ==
Sigmund and the Sea Monsters was the first Krofft Saturday morning production that was produced for more than one season. Previous entries H.R. Pufnstuf (1969), The Bugaloos (1970), and Lidsville (1971) were in production with new episodes for only a single season.

Sigmund, however, did not follow the "stranger in a strange land" premise as many of the previous Krofft shows had done. Other Krofft shows that did not follow the premise were The Bugaloos, Bigfoot and Wildboy, Pryor's Place and Wonderbug.

Costumes were created by Oliver Soublette.

One episode features an appearance by H.R. Pufnstuf and another that features Jack Wild (who played Jimmy on H.R. Pufnstuf).

The series was created and produced by Sid & Marty Krofft and Si Rose.

== Episodes ==
=== Season 1 (1973) ===
No.	Title	Directed by	Written by	Original release date
1	"The Monster Who Came to Dinner"	Richard Dunlap	Si Rose	September 8, 1973
Johnny and Scott bring Sigmund home to live in their clubhouse.
2	"Puppy Love"	Richard Dunlap	Rita Sedran Rose	September 15, 1973
Sigmund falls in love with a dog named Fluffy. Zelda cleans the clubhouse and Slurp tries to lure Sigmund home.
3	"Frankenstein Drops In"	Richard Dunlap	Si Rose	September 22, 1973
Sigmund's family kidnaps Scott, so Johnny dresses up like Frankenstein's monster to save him.
4	"Is There a Doctor in the Cave?"	Richard Dunlap	Si Rose	September 29, 1973
Johnny gets captured. The Wolfman makes a surprise appearance at the Ooze cave.
5	"Happy Birthdaze"	Richard Dunlap	John Fenton Murray	October 6, 1973
Sigmund decides to surprise the boys by cleaning the house, but his brothers crash in.
6	"The Nasty Nephew"	Richard Dunlap	John Fenton Murray	October 13, 1973
Zelda's obnoxious nephew Leroy stays the weekend.
7	"Monster Rock Festival"	Richard Dunlap	Si Rose	October 20, 1973
Sigmund submits his song to a radio songwriting contest and wins.
8	"Ghoul School Days"	Richard Dunlap	Rita Sedran Rose	October 27, 1973
Sigmund runs away because he feels like he's getting in the way. The Assistant Principal visits to discuss the boys' slipping grades.
9	"The Curfew Shall Ring Tonight"	Richard Dunlap	Jack Raymond	November 3, 1973
Sigmund accidentally breaks Zelda's bowl and decides to get money from his family's cave to replace it, but he is caught after curfew by the sea monster sheriff.
10	"Sweet Mama Redecorates"	Richard Dunlap	Warren Murray	November 10, 1973
Sweet Mama decides to redecorate the sea monster cave.
11	"Make Room for Big Daddy"	Richard Dunlap	Milt Rosen	November 17, 1973
When Blurp and Slurp destroy the family Shellavision, they run away and move into the club house with Sigmund. Big Daddy chases them home, but elects to stay and watch the club house TV.
12	"It's Your Move"	Richard Dunlap	Donald A. Ramsey	November 24, 1973
Sigmund's family evacuates the cave for a storm and Sigmund moves home to avoid Johnny and Scott's parents.
13	"Trick or Treat"	Richard Dunlap	Jack Raymond	December 1, 1973
On Halloween, Sigmund discovers the joys of trick or treating. The Ooze family learns that Sigmund has won a TV contest.
14	"Uncle Siggy Swings"	Richard Dunlap	John Fenton Murray	December 8, 1973
Sigmund's Uncle Siggy comes for a visit and falls for Zelda.
15	"The Dinosaur Show"	Richard Dunlap	Fred Fox and Seaman Jacobs	December 15, 1973
After thawing out of the ice, a caveman named Ook and his pet dinosaur Unkunk move into the Ooze's cave that they used to live in and force them out.
16	"The Wild Weekend"	Richard Dunlap	John Fenton Murray	December 22, 1973
Jack Wild spends the weekend with the boys. Prince runs away from home.
17	"Boy for a Day"	Richard Dunlap	John Fenton Murray (Story by: Rita Sedran Rose)	December 29, 1973
Sigmund gets amnesia and thinks he's a human boy.

=== Season 2 (1974) ===
No.	Title	Directed by	Written by	Original release date
18	"A Genie for Sigmund"	Bob Lally	Si Rose	July 7, 1974
Sigmund finds a genie named Sheldon in a sea shell.
19	"Paul Revere Rides Again"	Bob Lally	Si Rose	September 14, 1974
Sheldon zaps Paul Revere into the club house to settle a dispute.
20	"Now You See 'Em, Now You Don't"	Bob Lally	Rita Sedran Rose	September 21, 1974
Sheldon makes Johnny and Scott invisible.
21	"Johnny-O, the Great"	Bob Lally	Si Rose	September 28, 1974
With Sheldon's help, Johnny performs a magic act.
22	"Super Sigmund"	Bob Lally	John Fenton Murray	October 5, 1974
Sigmund has Sheldon give him super strength.
23	"Pufnstuf Drops In"	Bob Lally	Si Rose	October 12, 1974
Sheldon accidentally zaps H.R. Pufnstuf into the club house.

=== Season 3 (1975) ===
No.	Title	Directed by	Written by	Original release date
24	"Sheldon and the Nephew Sitters"	Dick Darley	Si Rose	September 6, 1975
Aunt Zelda goes to care for her sick sister, leaving Gertrude in charge at the house. Sheldon has to babysit his magic nephew Shelby.
25	"One Way Whammy to Tahit"	Dick Darley	Rita Sedran Rose	September 13, 1975
26	"Cry Uncle"	Murray Golden	John Fenton Murray	September 20, 1975
Sheldon finds himself in hot water with Gertrude when she discovers Shelby, whom she thinks is being neglected.
27	"The Haunted House"	Murray Golden	Fred S. Fox, Seaman Jacobs, Earle Doud, Chuck McCann	September 27, 1975
While Zelda and the Sheriff are at the movies, the Oozes sneak into the house.
28	"Mother Makes Ten"	Murray Golden	Story by: Rita Sedran Rose / Teleplay by: Jack Raymond	October 4, 1975
Shelby's mother takes care of Burp and Slurp.
29	"You Can't Beat a Magic Carpet"	Murray Golden	Fred S. Fox and Seaman Jacobs	October 10, 1975
Shelby and Sigmund get lost on a magic carpet ride.

== Home media ==
In the United States, the first season of the show was released on DVD in 2005 by Rhino Entertainment, featuring all 17 original broadcast episodes, uncut and digitally remastered. It was released again on September 6, 2011, from Vivendi Entertainment. Although there were plans for season two to be released on DVD, it was cancelled because of low sales. In Australia, the complete series was released in a region-free four-disk set by Beyond Home Entertainment.

== Reboot ==
In 2015 Sid and Marty Krofft announced that Amazon was partnering with them to create an updated version of Sigmund and the Sea Monsters. In June 2016, the pilot was released. In late 2016, it was announced that the pilot was picked up for a first season. Production for the first season occurred over the first half of 2017. A teaser trailer was released at the 2017 San Diego Comic-Con. In this version of the series, David Arquette plays Captain Barnabus who believes sea monsters are real and devotes his life to capturing them. Instead of living with a housekeeper, the boys are spending the summer at their aunt Maxine's with their cousin Robyn when they discover Sigmund. Seven episodes were released on October 13, 2017. The rest of the cast consists of Solomon Stewart as Johnny, Kyle Harrison Breitkopf as Scott, Rebecca Bloom as Robyn, Eileen O'Connell as Aunt Maxine, Johnny Whitaker as Zach, Mark Povinelli as Sigmund, Drew Massey as the voice of Sigmund, Meegan Godfrey as Blurp, Michael Oosterom as the voice of Blurp, Dan Crespin as Slurp, Victor Yerrid as the voice of Slurp, Lexi Pearl as Mama, and Donna Kimball as the voice of Mama.

=== Episodes ===
==== Season 1 (2016–2017) ====
No.	Title	Directed by	Written by	Original release date
1	"Pilot"	Jonathan Judge	Si Rose and Garrett Frawley and Brian Turner	June 17, 2016
Johnny and Scotty bring Sigmund home to their clubhouse.
2	"Finding Sigmund"	Ron Oliver	Stephen Engel	October 13, 2017
Sigmund and the kids set out to find each other.
3	"Dibs"	Ron Oliver	Jeny Quine	October 13, 2017
The kids teach Sigmund about calling "dibs".
4	"Robyn Has a Gift"	Ron Oliver	Garrett Frawley	October 13, 2017
Robyn gives her mother Maxine a birthday present made by Sigmund.
5	"The Squid Stays in the Picture"	Ron Oliver	Brad Turner	October 13, 2017
Johnny and Scotty decide to recruit Sigmund to make a monster movie.
6	"Sigmund and the Sand Castle Contest"	Ron Oliver	Jeny Quine	October 13, 2017
Sigmund helps Johnny and Robyn win the annual sand castle contest.
7	"The Treasure of Sigmund's Madre"	Ron Oliver	Stephen Engel	October 13, 2017
Johnny and Scott bring Sigmund home to live in their clubhouse.
