= Pufnstuf (film) =

1970 film directed by Hollingsworth Morse

- Theatrical release poster
- Directed by: Hollingsworth Morse
- Written by: John Fenton Murray; Si Rose
- Produced by: Si Rose
- Starring: Jack Wild; Billie Hayes; Martha Raye; Mama Cass; Billy Barty; Voices of Walker Edmiston; Joan Gerber; Al Melvin; Don Messick
- Cinematography: Kenneth Peach
- Edited by: David Rawlins
- Music by: Charles Fox
- Production company: Sid and Marty Krofft Enterprises
- Distributed by: Universal Pictures
- Release dates: 3 June 1970 (San Antonio); 15 June 1970 (United States)
- Running time: 98 minutes 94 minutes (Sony print)
- Country: United States
- Language: English
- Budget: $1 million

Pufnstuf (also known as Pufnstuf Zaps the World) is a 1970 American comedy fantasy musical film produced by Sid and Marty Krofft Enterprises and released by Universal Pictures. It is based on the children's television series H.R. Pufnstuf, a show that features a cast of puppets on a "living island."

== Plot ==
After Jimmy is ejected from the school band for tripping, his flute comes to life as a bejeweled golden flute named Freddy. They begin a journey. Orchestrated by Witchiepoo, Jimmy boards an evil boat to Living Island, an island where everything is sentient. He befriends the island's inhabitants, led by Mayor H.R. Pufnstuf, a humanoid dragon. Witchiepoo is determined to steal Freddy the Flute to impress the visiting Witches' Council and win the "Witch of the Year" Award.

She steals the flute by disguising herself as a pretty dance instructor. Jimmy and Pufnstuf go to Dr Blinky's house to plan a rescue for Freddy. A talking chimney gives Jimmy an idea. They inflitrate the castle disguised as firemen while Googy Gopher fakes a fire. As the gang celebrates their victory, mail carrier Orville Pelican delivers the mail. This inspires Pufnstuf to get Jimmy and Freddy off the island by riding in Orville's beak to the mainland. Due to their combined weight, they fail to take off and crash into a rock.

When Boss Witch announces the Witches' Council will be held at Witchiepoo's castle so she can see Freddy Flute, Witchiepoo retaliates by destroying Pufnstuf's town. She is blown away by the West Wind (portrayed as a cowboy head), and her Vroom Broom vehicle is destroyed. Jimmy feels sorry for having endangered the Living Island inhabitants and leaves with Freddy to prevent further danger. Disguised as a flower, Witchiepoo shrinks the townspeople and imprisons them in her dungeon. Jimmy is resolved to save them.

Witchiepoo prepares Pufnstuf as a meal for the Council by putting him in a rotisserie oven with an apple in his mouth. As Boss Witch, Witch Hazel and the other Council witches arrive, Jimmy disguises himself as a witch and mingles with them. Jimmy is exposed while trying to rescue Pufnstuf. Witchiepoo regains Freddy when she throws Jimmy back in the dungeon.

Googy Gopher digs into the dungeon to save them all, except for Pufnstuf who is still in the oven. Jimmy and the gang escape the castle. Boss Witch agrees to name Witchiepoo "Witch of the Year" in exchange for Freddy. Witchiepoo accepts. A book at Dr Blinky's house tells the escapees that the only thing that scares witches is a good fairy angel. They dress as white good fairy angels, raid the castle, scare off the Witches' Council and save Freddy and Pufnstuf.

Witchiepoo sees through the guise and tries to convince the Council to return to her castle. Witchiepoo commands her minion, Orson, to pilot the repaired Vroom Broom over the town and bomb it, but Orson, unable to do both, drops the bomb inside the vehicle, destroying it again and leaving Witchiepoo sniveling in defeat.

Jimmy and his friends' troubles are finally over...for now. During a closing musical number, Pufnstuf says, "When good friends pull together, they can do anything."

== Cast ==
- Jack Wild - Jimmy
- Billie Hayes - Wilhelmina W. Witchiepoo
- Cass Elliot - Witch Hazel
- Martha Raye - Boss Witch
- Billy Barty - Googy Gopher, Orville Pelican, Dwarf Witch
- Jane Dulo - Witch Way
- Allison McKay
- Jan Davis - Witch
- Princess Livingston - Witch
- Sharon Baird - Judy Frog, Stupid Bat, Shirley Pufnstuf
- Joy Campbell - Cling, Orson, Boyd, Hippie Ant
- Roberto Gamonet - H.R. Pufnstuf
- Andy Ratoucheff - Alarm Clock
- Angelo Rossitto - Clang, Seymour Spider
- Felix Silla - Polkadot Horse
- Johnny Silver - Dr. Blinky, Ludicrous Lion
- Van Snowden - Witch
- Lou Wagner
- Hommy Stewart
- Pat Lytell
- Buddy Douglas
- Jon Linton
- Bob Howland
- Scutter McKay
- Roberta Keith - Dancer
- Penny Krompier
- Brooks Hunnicutt
- Barrie Duffus - Dancer
- Evelyn Dutton - Dancer
- Tony Barro - Dancer
- Ken Creel - Dancer
- Fred Curt - Dancer
- Dennis Edenfield - Dancer

=== Voice cast ===
- Walker Edmiston - Dr. Blinky, Ludicrous Lion, Seymour Spider, Candle, Hippie Tree
- Joan Gerber - Madame Willow, Miss Wristwatch, Freddy the Flute (some scenes)
- Allan Melvin - H.R. Pufnstuf, Heinrich Rat, Living Island Boat, Orville Pelican, Polka-Dotted Horse, Stupid Bat, West Wind
- Don Messick - Freddy the Flute, Googy Gopher, Orson Vulture

Lennie Weinrib, who voiced H.R. Pufnstuf and other characters in the TV series, did not reprise his roles for this film.

== Production ==
Prior to the debut of H.R. Pufnstuf, Sid and Marty Krofft announced in May 1969 their intentions to produce a feature film based on the series.

Following the success of the H.R. Pufnstuf television series, the film was rushed into production for theatrical distribution, with filming beginning in January 1970. Universal Pictures and Kellogg's Cereal, who also sponsored the television show, provided financing.

Sid Krofft cast his next-door neighbor, singer Cass Elliot, as Witchiepoo's frenemy and bitter rival Witch Hazel. According to actress Joy Campbell McKenzie, Elliot was "very distant. Not rude or arrogant but she just didn't mingle, which most people were surprised about."

Martha Raye was cast as Boss Witch. The cast and crew expected Raye to behave as a diva, but she instead befriended those behind the scenes, even inviting them to dinner. However, Wild referred to Raye as "a right old cow." Raye's involvement in Pufnstuf led to her role as Benita Bizarre in the Kroffts' television show The Bugaloos. The film was released in San Antonio, Texas on June 3, 1970.

== Album ==
A soundtrack album was released on LP, cassette and 8-track in 1970 (Capitol/EMI Records SW-542), featuring the songs and the score by Charles Fox. A bootleg version of the LP was rereleased on CD in 2006 by El Records (ACMEM65CD). While the pressing is by a legitimate European company, the source tape is an unauthorized bootleg, noticeable for several loops added to various tracks.

=== Track listing ===
1. "If I Could" - Jack Wild
2. "Fire in the Castle"
3. "Living Island" - Jack Wild/Cast
4. "Witchiepoo's Lament"
5. "Angel Raid"
6. "A Friend In You" - Jack Wild
7. "How Lucky I Am"
8. "Pufnstuf" - Jack Wild/Cast
9. "Charge"
10. "Different" - Mama Cass Elliot
11. "Zap The World" - Jack Wild, Billie Hayes, Martha Raye
12. "Leaving Living Island"
13. "Rescue Racer To The Rescue"
14. "Finale:a) If I Could / b) Living Island" - Jack Wild
- Note: The title song was covered by the Pickwick Children's Chorus on the album Sesame Street and Other Children's Pop Hits.

== Home media ==
Pufnstuf was released to DVD on May 19, 2009, by Universal Studios Home Entertainment. It includes the original trailer of the film, and it is presented in its original widescreen presentation. It was later released to Blu-ray disc on September 21, 2021, by Code Red, also in widescreen and with the original trailer. The film is also available in digital media format.

== See also ==
- List of American films of 1970
