= Johnny Silver =

American actor and singer

- Johnny Silver in The Munsters 1966
- Born: John Silverman; April 16, 1918; East Chicago, Indiana, U.S.
- Died: February 1, 2003 (aged 84); Woodland Hills, California, U.S.
- Occupations: Actor; singer
- Years active: 1932–1995
- Spouse: Gloria Manos (m. 1954; death 1993)
- Children: 2

Johnny Silver (born John Silverman; April 16, 1918 – February 1, 2003) was an American actor and singer, best known for playing Benny Southstreet in the musical film Guys and Dolls.

== Career ==
Born in East Chicago, Indiana, Silver's performing arts career started early. He sang as a child, and subsequently expanded to acting. His early career involved performing with actor John Raitt at L.A. City College as well as radio work. He also worked as a burlesque comic.

During World War II, Silver was tasked with finding entertainment for the troops, and as a result, he met singer Mario Lanza. Silver helped Lanza secure a part in a play written by Peter Lind Hayes and Frank Loesser, On the Beam, and together they performed a number of variety acts for the troops.

Following the war, Silver moved to New York, and his big break came when he was cast as Benny Southstreet in Loesser's Broadway musical, Guys and Dolls, in 1950. He reprised the role for the film adaptation five years later.

Over the next 40 years, Silver worked prolifically as a character actor in film and on television. His film credits include Who's Been Sleeping in My Bed? (1963), The Great Race (1965), Lepke (1975), History of the World, Part I (1981) and Spaceballs (1987). Among his dozens of television credits, he appeared in seven episodes of Make Room for Daddy, 15 episodes of The Dick Van Dyke Show, six episodes of Mannix and five episodes of The Odd Couple. He also played the parts of Dr Blinky and Ludicrous Lion in H.R. Pufnstuf (Walker Edmiston provided the voices). His final television role was in 1995 in an episode of Seinfeld.

He was nominated for an Emmy Award for his performance in the 1967 episode of Bob Hope Presents the Chrysler Theatre, Free of Charge.

== Personal life and death ==
Silver was married to actress Gloria Manos from 1954 until her death in 1993. The couple had two daughters, Stephanie and Jennie.

Silver died of heart and kidney failure on February 1, 2003, at the age of 84.

== Partial filmography ==
Film

Year	Title	Role	Notes
1955	Guys and Dolls	Benny Southstreet	
1957	Public Pigeon No. One	Marvin	Uncredited
1963	Who's Been Sleeping in My Bed?	Charlie	
1965	The Great Race	Baker	Uncredited
1968	The Thomas Crown Affair	Bert	Uncredited
1968	How Sweet It Is!	Zipper Man	
1970	Pufnstuf	Dr Blinky/Ludicrous Lion	
1972	Hammer	Tiny	
1975	Lepke	Schwartz	
1981	History of the World, Part I	Small Liar – The Roman Empire	
1987	Spaceballs	Caddy	
1991	Shakes the Clown	Clown Tailor	

Television

Year	Title	Role	Notes
1950	NBC Television Opera Theatre	Various	3 episodes
1954	The Lone Wolf	Johnny Fr'Instance	Episode: “Skid Row”
1956	Alfred Hitchcock Presents	Fenton Shanks	Season 1 Episode 19: "The Derelicts"
1957	Alfred Hitchcock Presents	Jerry the Bartender	Season 2 Episode 24: "The Cream of the Jest"
1957	The Millionaire	Frankie	Episode: “The Chris Daniels Story”
1957	Leave it to Beaver	Man on Bridge	Episode: “The Clubhouse”
1955–57	The Jack Benny Program	Various	3 episodes
1957	Date with the Angels	Mr Carter	Episode: “A Day at the Track”
1958	Bat Masterson	Drummer	Episode: “Double Trouble in Trinidad”
1959	Bachelor Father	Charlie	Episode: “Bentley's Economy Wave”
1959	World of Giants	Chick Crescent	Episode: “Off Beat”
1959–60	The Untouchables	Various	2 episodes
1960	M Squad	J.C. Grevy	Episode: “Needle in a Haystack”
1956–61	Make Room for Daddy	Various	7 episodes
1963	The Andy Griffith Show	Prothro Hanson	Episode: “The Great Filling Station Robbery”
1964	Burke's Law	Various	2 episodes
1964	The Rogues	Boots Rafferty	Episode: “The Personal Touch”
1964	The Alfred Hitchcock Hour	Ben	Season 3 Episode 10: "Memo from Purgatory"
1961–65	The Joey Bishop Show	Various	5 episodes
1963–65	The Dick Van Dyke Show	Various	15 episodes
1964–66	The Munsters	Various	2 episodes
1966	Bonanza	Snowden	Episode: “Horse of a Different Hue”
1966	The F.B.I.	Various	2 episodes
1966–67	Bob Hope Presents the Chrysler Theatre	Various	2 episodes
1968	Good Morning World	John	Episode: “Pot Luckless”
1966–68	That Girl	Various	3 episodes
1968	Get Smart	Jojo	Episode: “The Secret of Sam Vittorio”
1969–70	H.R. Pufnstuf	Dr Blinky/Ludicrous Lion	17 episodes
1970	The Name of the Game	Various	2 episodes
1971	Sarge	Freddy	Episode: “The Silent Target”
1971	What's a Nice Girl Like You...?	Louis	TV movie
1962–72	My Three Sons	Various	4 episodes
1971–72	Here's Lucy	Various	2 episodes
1967–72	Ironside	Various	4 episodes
1970–72	McCloud	Various	2 episodes
1973	Maude	Various	2 episodes (one of which was uncredited)
1969–74	Mannix	Various	6 episodes
1970–75	The Odd Couple	Various	5 episodes (one of which was uncredited)
1973–75	Adam-12	Various	2 episodes
1973–75	The Streets of San Francisco	Various	2 episodes
1974	Kolchak: the Night Stalker	Pepe LaRue/Morris Shapiro	Episode: “The Spanish Moss Murders”
1978	Columbo	Tow Truck Driver	Episode: “The Conspirators”
1979	Delta House	Pizza Man	Episode: “The Blotto Who Came to Dinner”
1980	Barney Miller	Kingman	Episode: “Homicide Part 1”
1981	Evita Peron	Stage Manager	TV movie
1984	ABC Weekend Special	Leon	Episode: “Henry Hamilton Graduate Ghost”
1984	Alice	Shorty	Episode: “Undercover Mel”
1985	1st & Ten	Tinoretto	Episode: “Super Bull Sunday”
1986	Matlock	Eddie Alonzo	Episode: “The Don Part 1”
1986–88	Cagney & Lacey	Various	2 episodes
1995	Seinfeld	Vendor #1	Episode: “The Understudy”
