= Ratboy =

1986 film by Sondra Locke

- Cover of VHS release
- Directed by: Sondra Locke
- Written by: Rob Thompson
- Produced by: Fritz Manes
- Starring: Sondra Locke
- Cinematography: Bruce Surtees
- Edited by: Joel Cox
- Music by: Lennie Niehaus
- Production company: Malpaso Productions
- Distributed by: Warner Bros.
- Release date: October 17, 1986 (United States)
- Running time: 104 minutes
- Country: United States
- Language: English
- Budget: $8 million

Ratboy is a 1986 American comedy-drama film directed by and starring Sondra Locke. The make-up effects were designed by Rick Baker. The film's scenario is at times comic or serious, and one of its peculiarities is that there never is any explanation for Ratboy's origin and existence as a human-rat hybrid.

Principal photography started on September 6, 1985, and ended by November 1985. Ratboy had a troubled production and was both a critical and commercial failure.

== Synopsis ==
A former window dresser named Nikki Morrison overhears mention of a mysterious "Ratboy" named Eugene while dumpster diving at a dump. After finding and befriending him, Nikki makes several attempts at marketing his uniqueness to the public. At the same time, Eugene wishes to avoid public attention.

== Cast ==
- Sondra Locke as Nikki Morrison
- Sharon Baird as Eugene / Ratboy (credited as S.L. Baird)
  - Gordon Anderson as the voice of Eugene / Ratboy
- Robert Townsend as Manny
- Christopher Hewett as Acting Coach
- Larry Hankin as Robert Jewell
- Sydney Lassick as Lee "Dial-A-Prayer"
- Gerrit Graham as Billy Morrison
- Louie Anderson as Omer Morrison
- Billie Bird as Psychic
- John Witherspoon as "Heavy"
- Charles Bartlett as Catullus Cop
- Nina Blackwood as MTV VJ
- Courtney Gains as Kid in Car
- Diane Delano as Aurora
- M.C. Gainey as Police Officer
- Jon Lovitz as Party Guest
- Bill Maher as Party Guest
- Kathleen Wilhoite as Party Guest
- Tim Thomerson as Alan Reynolds (uncredited)

== Production ==
Rick Baker spent eight months designing the titular Ratboy specifically with Sharon Baird in mind for the role. The entire pre-production process was kept under wraps, with the project only being announced in the trades four days before shooting began.

== Marketing ==
The Los Angeles Times shaved six years off Sondra Locke's age in an article to promote the film.

== Release ==
The film was given a limited opening in only two cities, Los Angeles and New York.

== Reception ==
The film has a "rotten" rating of 25% on Rotten Tomatoes. Roger Ebert of the Chicago Sun-Times gave it two out of four stars, calling the film "perplexing" and criticizing the film's unique premise devolving into a more standard narrative. Janet Maslin of The New York Times called the film "disorganized", criticizing the script and directing choices of Locke. On the opposite end, Michael Wilmington of the Los Angeles Times was more positive, calling the film, "Grimm Brothers-style, mixing wonder with rough edges, undertones of pain beneath the fantasy."

=== Awards ===
Sondra Locke received a nomination for the Golden Raspberry Award for Worst Actress at the 8th Golden Raspberry Awards.
