= Dumbo's Circus =

- Starring: Patty Maloney; Mark Sawyer; Van Snowden; Joe Giamalava; Sharon Baird; Norman Merrill, Jr.; Caleb Chung; Ron Mangham
- Voices of: Katie Leigh; Phil Baron; Jim Cummings; Walker Edmiston; Ron Gans; Patricia Parris; Will Ryan; Hal Smith
- Opening theme: "Dumbo's Circus" by Phil Baron
- Ending theme: "Gotta Fly" by Phil Baron
- Composer: John Debney
- Country of origin: United States
- No. of seasons: 1
- No. of episodes: 120

Production
- Running time: 30 minutes
- Production companies: Left Coast Television; Walt Disney Pictures Television

Original release
- Network: The Disney Channel
- Release: May 6, 1985 – May 25, 1986

Dumbo's Circus is a live action/puppet television series that aired on The Disney Channel beginning on May 6, 1985 to May 25, 1986. and featured the character of Dumbo from the original film. Reruns continued to air until February 28, 1997.

The cast members are human-sized anthropomorphic animals played by people in full-bodied puppet suits. Many of the show's cast went on to star in the Christian radio series, Adventures in Odyssey. The wagon used in the show was seen in the late 1980s and early 1990s on the vehicle boneyard lot of the Studio Backlot Tour at Disney-MGM Studios in Lake Buena Vista, Florida. When the series started, Sebastian is seen wearing only his hat, vest and short pants. After a few episodes, he is given a white T-shirt to go with it. Some of the puppets used for audience members in the circus were used for The Mother Goose Video Treasury.

== Background ==
In the show, Dumbo has grown up, is finally able to speak, and has struck out on his own to begin his own circus. He and a cast of characters fly from town to town, in a wagon pulled through the air by Dumbo, performing their "greatest little show on earth". Other than Dumbo, none of the characters from the original film appeared in the show. Each character would perform a particular talent, which ranged from dancing and singing to telling knock-knock jokes.

== Characters ==
=== Main ===
- Dumbo, also known as the "World's Only Flying Elephant", (voiced by Katie Leigh) – The star of the circus. Dumbo still relies on his magic feather to help him fly. He can usually be seen pulling the Circus wagon from place to place up in the sky. Often breaks the fourth wall towards the viewers, telling them when it's time for a song or the sideshow. Being an elephant, Dumbo's memory is usually very good (based on the expression "An elephant never forgets"), his hearing is very sharp and sometimes, his sneezes are often strong - strong enough to cause some wind. Most of all, he now can speak (unlike in the original 1941 film where he was mute).
- Lionel (performed by Sharon Baird, voiced by Jim Cummings) – A high-pitched Brooklyn-accented lion with a knot in his tail who serves as Dumbo's right-hand partner, as well as the Circus's popcorn vendor, ticket taker, sideshow barker, and poster painter. Lionel was inspired by the character of Timothy Q. Mouse from the 1941 film and says goodbye to the viewers at the end of several episodes. Lionel's voice is almost similar to Timothy Q. Mouse as well. However, unlike Timothy Q. Mouse, who wears a red drum major's uniform, Lionel wears a blue uniform (as do the performers in the circus band). Lionel, along with Sebastian, was with Dumbo when he first started on his own.
- Sebastian (voiced by Walker Edmiston) – A purple alley cat who is usually reduced to janitorial duties and likes to nap any chance he gets. He sometimes tricks others (usually Q.T.) to do his own work, but sometimes, his tricks backfire on him. In the sideshow, Sebastian has a ventriloquism dummy with him called Sly and can also play the violin. Sebastian joined Dumbo and Lionel because Dumbo's mother promised Sebastian's mother that he could travel with them. Sly can also find use for any trash that he would consider treasures.
- Fair Dinkum, also known as "Dink" for short, (performed by Patty Maloney, voiced by Hal Smith) – a koala who serves as ringmaster of the circus. As he is from Australia, he speaks with an Australian accent. There are a few things that Dink is afraid of, including heights and drowning. His name comes from the Australian phrase, "fair dinkum". He was the first to join Dumbo, Lionel and Sebastian when they were just starting out.
- Barnaby Bowser (voiced by Will Ryan) – A goofy dog who is the clown and magician as "Barnaby the Great", he is known for saying "Ah-hee-ee-ee-ee-ee" whenever he laughs and speaks with a Southern U.S. accent. His magic tricks don't always work out the way he wants them to, and he is good friends with Lionel and Q.T. while having a friendly rivalry with Sebastian. He also gets scared easily. His signature song is "I'm Just a Lucky Dog", which he often hums. Barnaby comes from a big family - Edison Bowser (who invented flea powder), Isadoga Bowser (a famous dancer who perfected the "Dog trot"), Julia Bowser (Barnaby's favorite, as she invented the hot dog) and his famous uncle, Lattimer Bowser III. Barnaby shares a trait with Rabbit from Welcome to Pooh Corner (also voiced by Will Ryan), as both are gifted magicians. The only difference is that Rabbit's tricks usually work well, whereas Barnaby's don't always work the way he wants them to (though it sometimes gets plenty of laughs). Barnaby was the last to join the circus after Q.T., and before Fair Dinkum's twin brother, Rinkum Dinkum, joined up.
- Lilli (voiced by Patricia Parris) – A beautiful cat who serves as a tightrope walker in the circus, and the only female character in the series before Matilda appeared. She sometimes wears glasses because of her bad eyesight - mostly to see things that are very close, like books, signs, and to play checkers. She also likes pretty things. Originally from Williamsport, Lilli joined the circus after Fair Dinkum, with her mother Mrs. Lilli (also voiced by Patricia Parris)'s blessing. She comes from a long line of high-wire walkers (starting with Great-Grandma Lilli, Granny May, and Mrs. Lilli), with Lilli carrying on the family tradition in Dumbo's Circus. Lilli is also a good magician as seen in "Who's Got the Feather?"
- Q.T. (performed by Caleb Chung, voiced by Ron Gans) – A slow-witted, but good-natured orangutan who is the resident strongman and calliope player. In earlier episodes, he was accompanied by a small pink creature while playing the calliope. Q.T. makes friends easily and has other talents, like kite making. Sometimes, he doesn't know his own strength. Q.T. joined the circus after Lilli and is one of a few characters that considers Sebastian a friend.

=== Others ===
- Flip & Flap (performed by Paul Fusco and John Lovelady) – A duo of indeterminate species who are usually seen during the sideshow, telling each other jokes. They are identifiable by their appearances - Flip has long rabbit ears and Flap has a red afro, a pig-like nose, and cat-like ears. Unlike the other characters, Flip and Flap are depicted as hand puppet characters.
- Rinkum Dinkum (voiced by Hal Smith) – Fair Dinkum's older twin brother. In contrast to Fair Dinkum, Rinkum is much more brave and doesn't scare easily. Like his brother, Rinkum speaks with an Australian accent. He joins the circus as the resident stunt performer. During the Side Show, Rinkum puts on a show in which the audience has to guess what country he once visited and is pretending to be from.
- Matilda Dinkum (voiced by Mona Marshall) – Rinkum and Fair Dinkum's younger Australian-accented sister and loves to dance. Also known as "Matty". Her name comes from the famous Australian song "Waltzing Matilda". She becomes the honorary circus timekeeper, an idea shared by Lionel and Fair Dinkum. Matilda is one of a few characters that consider Sebastian a friend.
- Lattimer Bowser III (voiced by Laurie Main) – Barnaby's English-accented uncle who is a famous explorer. He looks like Barnaby, but is much older, with a moustache (which he occasionally brushes with his hands), and wears a monocle and a pith helmet.
- Fira (voiced by Jim Cummings) – Lilli's aunt, who speaks with an upper-class accent. She looks like Lilli, but whereas Lilli only wears glasses for reading, she wears glasses all the time. Fira finds Sebastian to be sneaky, even if he is a cat.
- Mrs. Jumbo – Dumbo's mother, whom he sometimes talks about. She gave Dumbo his circus cart and promised Sebastian's mother that her son could accompany Dumbo and Lionel when they were first starting out.

=== Side-show acts ===
- Sebastian and Sly
- Flip and Flap
  - Flip and Flap at the Restaurant
- Dumbo's Nursery Rhymes
- Barnaby's Magic Show
- Q.T.'s Knock-Knock Jokes
- Lilli's Tongue Twisters
- Rinkum Dinkum's Make-Believe
- Lilli's Mystery

Lionel introduces all of the side-show acts.

== Cast ==
=== Voices ===
- Katie Leigh - Dumbo
- Phil Baron
- Jim Cummings - Lionel the Lion, Aunt Fira
- Walker Edmiston - Sebastian
- Ron Gans - Q.T.
- Patricia Parris - Lilli, Mrs. Lilli
- Will Ryan - Barnaby Bowser
- Hal Smith - Fair Dinkum, Rinkum Dinkum

==== Additional voices ====
- Patty Foley
- Joan Gerber
- Laurie Main - Uncle Lattimer Bowser III
- Mona Marshall - Matilda Dinkum
- Diane Michelle
- B.J. Ward

=== Puppeteers ===
- Paul Fusco - Flip
- John Lovelady - Flap

=== In-suit performers ===
- Sharon Baird - Lionel
- Caleb Chung - Q.T.
- Charlie Edwards
- Joe Giamalva
- Richard Griggs
- Frank Groby
- Ron Mangham
- Patty Maloney - Fair Dinkum
- Norman Merrill Jr.
- Tom Reed
- Mark Sawyer
- Van Snowden

== Recurring songs ==
The songs were written by Phil Baron, Robin Frederick, Dan Crow, and Will Ryan.

- "Dumbo's Circus" (Opening theme song)
- "Dumbo's Traveling Circus"
- "The Marching Band Parade" (Dumbo, Lionel, Barnaby and the Chorus)
- "Clowning Around" (Chorus)
- "I'm Just a Lucky Dog" (Barnaby)
- "Follow Me, Follow Me" (Lilli)
- "I'm an Elephant Song" (Some episodes play it during the closing credits instead of "Gotta Fly")
- "I Love a Circus" (Chorus) (Some episodes plays it during the closing credits instead of "Gotta Fly")
- "Hand Clappin'" (Barnaby and Lionel)
- "March to the Music"(Lionel)
- "Dumbo's Up in the Air" (Chorus)
- "A Genuine Clown" (Barnaby)
- "Hello, Hello" (Chorus)
- "One, Two, Three, Pop" (Chorus)
- "More Fun Than a Barrel of Monkeys" (Barnaby)
- "Gotta Fly" (Regular Closing theme song)
