= Van Snowden =

American puppeteer (1939–2010)

- Born: Van Charles Snowden; February 19, 1939; San Francisco, California, US
- Died: 22 September 2010 (aged 71); Burbank, California, US
- Occupation: Puppeteer
- Years active: 1969–2007

Van Charles Snowden (February 19, 1939 – September 22, 2010) was an American puppeteer active in the film and television industries for decades. Snowden performed as the H.R. Pufnstuf character in most projects after the original series and film. His other credits included the horror films Child's Play 2 and Child's Play 3, Tales from the Crypt and D.C. Follies.

== Early life ==
Snowden was born in San Francisco, California, in 1939. He was raised in Branson, Missouri, on a farm. Van was the son of Wyatt Estes Snowden and Ortha Dufree.

== Career ==
Snowden performed as a puppeteer on the Sid and Marty Krofft film Pufnstuf, a spin-off of the series H.R. Pufnstuf, and would take over from Roberto Gamonet as Pufnstuf in subsequent appearances. He continued to collaborate with Sid and Marty Krofft on a number of their other productions, including Land of the Lost, Sigmund and the Sea Monsters, Lidsville and The Bugaloos. Additionally, Snowden toured with The Pufnstuf Road Show for two years, and made an appearance in the non-Krofft series Mother Goose's Treasury.

In 1989, Snowden and other puppeteers were nominated for an Emmy Award for Outstanding Performance in a Variety or Musical Program at the 41st Primetime Emmy Awards for their work on D.C. Follies. The nomination marked the first time that the Primetime Emmy Awards had honored puppeteers in their history. However, Snowden and the cast of D.C. Follies lost to singer Linda Ronstadt, who won for her performance on Great Performances on PBS that year.

Snowden also assisted with the puppetry for the character Chucky in the horror films Child's Play 2 (1990) and Child's Play 3 (1991). His other film credits included work on Beetlejuice (1988), Bill & Ted's Bogus Journey (1991), Dracula (1992), Alien Resurrection (1997), Starship Troopers (1997) and The X-Files (1998). During the 1980s, Snowden became the lead puppeteer on the television series Pee-wee's Playhouse. He was part of the puppetry team for The Crypt Keeper on Tales from the Crypt, an anthology series which aired from 1989 until 1996.

His last television credit was as H.R. Pufnstuf on an episode of My Name is Earl in 2007.

Snowden also worked for the puppeteer division of Hasbro and its Tiger Electronics division. He was part of the puppetry and programming team which developed the body, mouth and eye movements for such interactive toys as Furby, E.T., Gizmo and Yoda. Snowden headed Hasbro's puppeteer division for the last three years of his life and career.

== Death ==
Snowden died from cancer on September 22, 2010, at St. Joseph's Hospital in Burbank, California, at the age of 71. He was survived by his brother, Nick, and sister, Deanna.

== Filmography ==
- Pufnstuf (1970)
- The Bugaloos (1970–1971) - Tweeter
- Lidsville (1971–1972) - Tonsilini the Opera Hat, Pierre LeSewer, Pufnstuf
- Fol-de-Rol (1972) - Puppeteer
- The NBC Saturday Morning Preview Revue (1974) - Petey the Peacock
- Sigmund and the Sea Monsters (1973–1974) - Sweet Mama Ooze
- Land of the Lost (1975) - Zarn
- The Brady Bunch Hour (1977) - Cher Crow, H.R. Pufnstuf
- The Bay City Rollers Meet the Saturday Superstars (1978) - Various characters
- The Hanna-Barbera Happy Hour (1978) - Head puppeteer
- Barbara Mandrell and the Mandrell Sisters (1980) - Puppeteer
- The Hoboken Chicken Emergency (1984) - Henrietta (in-suit performer)
- The Patti LaBelle Show (1985) - Puppeteer
- Dumbo's Circus (1985) - Assistant puppeteer
- D.C. Follies (1987) - Assistant puppet builder
- The Mother Goose Video Treasury (1987) - Humpty Dumpty, Townsperson of Gooseberry Glen
- Beetlejuice (1988) - Puppeteer
- Redeye Express (1988) - Puppeteer
- Pee-wee's Playhouse (1988) - Puppet operator, puppet supervisor
- Christmas at Pee Wee's Playhouse (1988) - Puppet operator
- Tales from the Crypt (1989–1995) - Puppeteer of Crypt Keeper
- Child's Play 2 (1990) - Additional puppeteer of Chucky
- Child's Play 3 (1991) - Additional puppeteer of Chucky
- Bill & Ted's Bogus Journey (1991) - Puppeteer
- Bram Stoker's Dracula (1992) - Additional puppeteer
- Toby Terrier and His Video Pals (1993) - Head puppeteer
- Casper (1995) - Puppeteer of Crypt Keeper
- Bordello of Blood (1996) - Puppeteer of Crypt Keeper
- The X Files (1998) - Puppeteer
- My Name Is Earl (2007) - H.R. Pufnstuf
