= Caroline Ellis =

English actress

- Born: 12 October 1950 (age 74); London, England
- Occupation: Actress

Caroline Ellis (born 12 October 1950 in Whetstone, North London) is a retired English actress. She is best known for her role in Only Fools and Horses as Michelle and her other roles in a 1968 TV adaptation of the Sherlock Holmes story The Boscombe Valley Mystery, Jill Rowles in the Southern TV adventure series Freewheelers in 1972, and a "Brummie" holiday camper (Glad) in the raunchy 1977 comedy film Confessions from a Holiday Camp.

Ellis was best known to American audiences for her role as the character Joy in The Bugaloos (1970).

Ellis is divorced and the mother of one daughter, Sasha, born in 1985. As of 2006, Ellis was no longer acting but was working in real estate in Spain, where she lived with her daughter.

A sampled excerpt of Ellis singing a line from the Bugaloos appears on "The Darkness That You Fear", a 2021 single from The Chemical Brothers.

== Filmography ==
=== Film ===
Year	Title	Role	Notes
1977	Confessions from a Holiday Camp	Glad	

=== Television ===
Year	Title	Role	Notes
1968	Sherlock Holmes	Patience Moran	Episode: "The Boscombe Valley Mystery"
1970–1971	The Bugaloos	Joy	
1972	Freewheelers	Jill Rowles	
1976	The Many Wives of Patrick	Sheila	Episode: "Goodbye and Hello"
1980	Sherlock Holmes and Doctor Watson	Theresa	Episode: "The Case of the Travelling Killer"
1981	Only Fools and Horses	Michelle	Episode: "Go West Young Man"
1982–1983	The Cut Price Comedy Show		
