= Pandamonium (TV series) =

American animated television series

- Genre: Adventure; Fantasy
- Voices of: David Banks; Rick Dees; Alan Dinehart; Walker Edmiston; Katie Leigh; Julie McWhirter; Cliff Norton; Neil Ross; Janet Waldo; Jesse White; William Woodson
- Theme music composer: Johnny Douglas
- Country of origin: United States
- Original language: English
- No. of seasons: 1
- No. of episodes: 13

Production
- Executive producers: Fred Silverman; David H. DePatie
- Producer: Tony Benedict
- Running time: 20–21 minutes
- Production companies: InterMedia Entertainment Company; Marvel Productions; MGM/UA Television; Pan Sang East Co., Ltd

Original release
- Network: CBS
- Release: September 18 – December 11, 1982

Related
- Meatballs & Spaghetti

Pandamonium is an American animated television series that aired on CBS. It was one of the first non-Tom and Jerry-related animated television series made by MGM Television, and was one of the last Saturday morning cartoon series to be fitted with a laugh track. The show ended after 13 episodes.

== Synopsis ==
When an evil alien named Mondraggor (voiced by William Woodson) attempted to steal an ancient object called the Pyramid of Power, the pyramid shattered into many pieces, which scattered around the world. Each week, Mondraggor would race against two human siblings, Peter and Peggy Darrow, who were accompanied by three talking pandas named Chesty, Timothy, and Algernon, who were irradiated by the Pyramid's magic. The three of them can unite to form Poppapanda, a being with supernatural power.

In the air, Mondraggor possessed control over wind, fire, thunder and lightning. On Earth, however, all of his powers disappeared except for his ability to control people's minds, leading him to brainwash several people in his attempt to claim the pyramid pieces.

The series was canceled after one season before all of the pieces of the Pyramid of Power were successfully found by the human and panda team. However, they did manage to collect enough pieces by the end of the series to be able to take advantage of their power to a degree in times of need.

== Voice cast ==
- Jesse White as Chesty
- Cliff Norton as Timothy
- Walker Edmiston as Algernon
- Neil Ross as Peter Darrow
- Katie Leigh as Peggy Darrow
- Julie McWhirter as Amanda Panda
- William Woodson as Mondraggor

== Episodes ==
No.	Title	Original release date
1	"The Beginning"	September 18, 1982
2	"Algernon's Story"	September 25, 1982
3	"Timothy's Story"	October 2, 1982
4	"The Itty-Bitty City"	October 9, 1982
5	"Chesty's Story"	October 16, 1982
6	"Amanda Panda's Story"	October 23, 1982
7	"Ice Hassles"	October 30, 1982
8	"Methinks the Sphinx Jinx Stinks"	November 6, 1982
9	"Prehistoric Hysterics"	November 13, 1982
10	"Once Upon a Time Machine"	November 20, 1982
11	"The Cybernetic City"	November 27, 1982
12	"20,000 Laughs Beneath the Sea"	December 4, 1982
13	"The Great Space Chase"	December 11, 1982
