= Billie Hayes =

American actress (1924–2021)

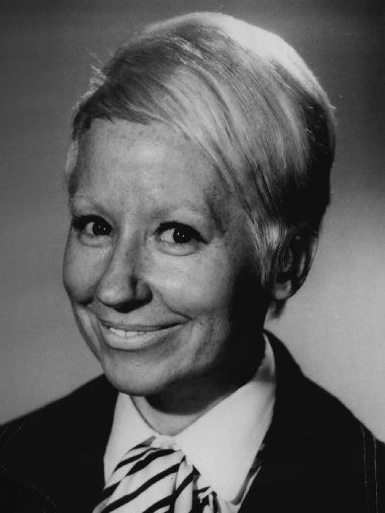
- Hayes c. 1969
- Born: Billie Armstrong Brosch; August 5, 1924; Du Quoin, Illinois, U.S.
- Died: April 29, 2021 (aged 96); Los Angeles, California
- Occupation: Actress
- Years active: 1934–2016
- Website: www.billiehayes.com

Billie Armstrong Brosch (August 5, 1924 – April 29, 2021), known professionally as Billie Hayes, was an American television, film, and stage actress, best known for her comic portrayals of Witchiepoo and Li'l Abner's Mammy Yokum.

== Early years ==
Hayes was born in Du Quoin, Illinois, on August 5, 1924, to Charles and Marie (Armstrong) Brosch. Her father was from Germany, and was a coal miner who headed the local miners' union. Her mother was from Illinois, and worked in administration relief. She had an older brother, Louis Brosch. She started working professionally in entertainment at the age of nine, tap dancing in local theatres. By the time she was in high school, she played in bandleader Vince Genovese's orchestra, then toured with her own singing and dancing act throughout the Midwest. Hayes then moved on to New York City, where she auditioned for theatre owner/operator and producer J.J. Shubert, and was hired for principal roles in three roadshow operettas: The Student Prince, The Merry Widow, and Blossom Time.

== Career ==
Hayes was known for her comic portrayal of Wilhelmina W. Witchiepoo on NBC's Sid and Marty Krofft television series H.R. Pufnstuf, as well as in the 1970 film Pufnstuf based on the series. Her characteristic cackle and animated physicality were notable during the show's 17-episode run in 1969–70. She reprised the role in another Sid and Marty Krofft program Lidsville (while also having a regular role as Weenie the Genie), and in The Paul Lynde Halloween Special (1976). Hayes portrayed a similar character in another television role as the gingerbread-house witch in Season 8, Episode 10 (1971) of Bewitched ("Hansel and Gretel in Samantha-Land").

Hayes played Mammy Pansy Yokum in the Li'l Abner 1956 Broadway musical, the 1959 film adaptation, and a 1971 television special. In 1966, she toured with the national company of Hello, Dolly! starring Betty Grable. Hayes made television appearances on Murder, She Wrote, on the soap opera General Hospital as Robert Scorpio's mentor O'Reilly in 1981 and 1985, and in the role of Maw Weskitt in Episode 39 of the second season of The Monkees ("Hillbilly Honeymoon").

Her first voice work role was as Orgoch in the 1985 film The Black Cauldron. Other voice work roles included Mother Mae-Eye in the animated series Teen Titans, One-Eyed Sally in The Wacky Adventures of Ronald McDonald, Granny Applecheeks in The Grim Adventures of Billy & Mandy, and roles in The Further Adventures of SuperTed, The Nightmare Before Christmas, Johnny Bravo, W.I.T.C.H., The Batman, TaleSpin, The Brothers Flub, Bubble Guppies, Rugrats, Transformers: Rescue Bots, Duckman, Shrek Forever After, Bonkers, Problem Child, Siegfried and Roy: Masters of the Impossible, and Darkwing Duck.

Hayes retired from acting in 2016.

== Personal life and death ==
Hayes was the president of the animal rescue organization Pet Hope.

Hayes died of natural causes at Cedars-Sinai Medical Center, Los Angeles, California, on April 29, 2021, at the age of 96.

== Filmography ==
=== Film ===
Year	Title	Role	Notes
1959	Li'l Abner	Mammy Yokum	
1970	Pufnstuf	Witchiepoo	
1985	The Black Cauldron	Orgoch (voice)	
1987	Snowballing	Emma Ferguson	
1999	The Wacky Adventures of Ronald McDonald: The Legend of Grimace Island	One-Eyed Sally (voice)	Direct-to-video
2010	Shrek Forever After	Cackling Witch (voice)	

=== Television ===
Year	Title	Role	Notes
1967	The Monkees	Maw	Episode: "Hillbilly Honeymoon"
1967	The Monroes	Mrs. Peabody	Episode: "Manhunt"
1969–1970	H.R. Pufnstuf	Wilhelmina Witchiepoo	Main role
1971	Bewitched	Witch	Episode: "Hansel and Gretel in Samanthaland"
1971–1972	Lidsville	Weenie the Genie	Main role
1976	Wonderbug	Agnes	Episode: "I Kidd You Not"
1977	Tabitha	Sister Rosalind	Episode: "Mr. Nice Guy"
1978	The Bay City Rollers Show	Witchiepoo, Weenie the Geenie	8 episodes
1981, 1985	General Hospital	Brighton O'Reilly	2 episodes
1982	Trapper John, M.D.	Mrs. Landers	Episode: "Cause for Concern"
1984	Murder, She Wrote	Peter Pan	Episode: "The Murder of Sherlock Holmes"
1985	Paw Paws	Additional voices	
1987	Mathnet	Mrs. MacGregor	Episode: "The Problem of the Missing Baseball"
1987	Square One Television	Mrs. MacGregor	2 episodes
1989	The Further Adventures of SuperTed	Blotch, Slot Machine Owner (voice)	2 episodes
1991	Darkwing Duck	Old Lady, Grammy Whammy (voice)	2 episodes
1991	TaleSpin	Crazy Edie, Mrs. Nelson (voice)	2 episodes
1993	Bonkers	Old Lady (voice)	Episode: "Frame That Toon"
1995	Aaahh!!! Real Monsters	Selma (voice)	Episode: "A Room with No Viewfinder"
1996	Duckman	Nurse (voice)	Episode: "A Room with a Bellevue"
1997	Johnny Bravo	Old Woman (voice)	Episode: "Johnny Bravo Meets Adam West"
1997–2000	Rugrats	Fabulous Lady, Woman (voice)	2 episodes
2001	What a Cartoon!	Nadine's Grandma (voice)	Episode: "My Freaky Family: Welcome to My World"
2004	The Powerpuff Girls	Old Lad (voice)	Episode: "Curses"
2005	Teen Titans	Mother Mae-Eye (voice)	Episode: "Mother Mae-Eye"
2005	The Grim Adventures of Billy & Mandy	Granny Applecheeks (voice)	Episode: "Puddle Jumping"
2005	The Batman	Virginia, Georgia (voice)	Episode: "Grundy's Night"
2006	W.I.T.C.H.	Emily (voice)	Episode: "M is For Mercy"
2012–2016	Transformers: Rescue Bots	Mrs. Neederlander (voice)	8 episodes
2013–2014	Teen Titans Go!	Mother Mae-Eye (voice)	2 episodes
2013	Bubble Guppies	The Snuggler (voice)	Episode: "The Elephant Trunk-a-Dunk!"
