= Saturday Morning: Cartoons' Greatest Hits =

Compilation album by various artists
- Released: December 5, 1995
- Recorded: 1995
- Genres: Pop-punk; post-grunge; alternative rock; pop rock
- Length: 65:29
- Label: MCA
- Producer: Ralph Sall

Professional ratings
Review scores
Source	Rating
AllMusic	2/5 stars
Alternative Press	4/5 stars

Saturday Morning: Cartoons' Greatest Hits is a tribute album of songs from Saturday morning children's television shows and cartoons (mostly) from the 1960s and 1970s. The project was produced by Ralph Sall, with the songs performed by alternative rock artists. It was released in 1995 by MCA on LP, cassette, and CD. On the Billboard 200, it entered the chart during the week from December 17 to 23, 1995 with a "Gains in Weekly Performance" award; peaked at #67 during the week from January 28 to February 3, 1996, after seven weeks on the chart; and stayed on the chart for a total of 16 weeks. Promotion for the album included a comic book from Marvel Comics and a music video collection hosted by Drew Barrymore (MCA Home Video MCAV-11348). Sponge's cover of "Go Speed Racer Go" would be featured in the English dub for the 1997 reboot of Speed Racer titled Speed Racer Y2K which was produced by Speed Racer Enterprises and Ocean Productions.

== Track listing ==
No.	Title	Writer(s)	Artist	Length
1.	"The Tra La La Song (One Banana, Two Banana)" (from The Banana Splits Adventure Hour)	Mark Barkan; Ritchie Adams	Liz Phair with Material Issue	3:12
2.	"Go Speed Racer Go" (from Speed Racer)	Nobuyoshi Koshibe; Peter Fernandez	Sponge	3:06
3.	"Sugar, Sugar" (from The Archie Show)	Jeff Barry; Andy Kim	Mary Lou Lord with Semisonic	3:52
4.	"Scooby-Doo, Where Are You?" (from Scooby-Doo, Where Are You!)	David Mook; Ben Raleigh	Matthew Sweet	3:12
5.	"Josie and the Pussycats" (from Josie and the Pussycats)	Denby Williams; Joseph Roland; Hoyt Curtin	Juliana Hatfield and Tanya Donelly	2:53
6.	"The Bugaloos" (from The Bugaloos)	Norman Gimbel; Charles Fox	Collective Soul	3:17
7.	"Underdog" (from Underdog)	Chester Stover; Watts Biggers; Treadwell Covington; Joseph Harris	Butthole Surfers	3:54
8.	"Gigantor" (from Gigantor)	Louis C. Singer; Eugene Raskin	Helmet	4:12
9.	"Spider-Man" (from Spider-Man)	Robert "Bob" Harris; Paul Francis Webster	Ramones	2:05
10.	"Jonny Quest/Stop That Pigeon" (from Jonny Quest/Dastardly and Muttley in Their Flying Machines)	William Hanna; Joseph Barbera; Hoyt Curtin	The Reverend Horton Heat	3:10
11.	"Open Up Your Heart and Let the Sun Shine In" (from The Flintstones)	Stuart Hamblen	Frente!	3:37
12.	"Eep Opp Ork Ah-Ah (Means I Love You)" (from The Jetsons)	William Hanna; Joseph Barbera; Hoyt Curtin	Violent Femmes	3:21
13.	"Fat Albert Theme" (from Fat Albert and the Cosby Kids)	Ricky Sheldon; Edward Fournier	Dig	3:44
14.	"I'm Popeye the Sailor Man" (from Popeye)	Sammy Lerner	Face to Face	3:03
15.	"Friends/Sigmund and the Seamonsters" (from Sigmund and the Sea Monsters)	Danny Janssen; Bobby Hart	Tripping Daisy	4:21
16.	"Goolie Get-Together" (from The Groovie Goolies)	Linda Martin; Janis Gwin	Toadies	3:48
17.	"Hong Kong Phooey" (from Hong Kong Phooey)	Hoyt Curtin; William Hanna; Joseph Barbera	Sublime	3:43
18.	"H.R. Pufnstuf" (from H.R. Pufnstuf)	Les Szarvas; Paul Simon	The Murmurs	3:17
19.	"Happy, Happy, Joy, Joy" (from The Ren and Stimpy Show)	Charlie Brissette; John Kricfalusi; Christopher Reccardi	Wax	3:28

== Album credits ==
- All tracks produced by Ralph Sall for Bulletproof Recording Company Inc.
- Executive Producer/Concept: Ralph Sall for Bulletproof Recording Company Inc.
- Engineered by Peter McCabe and Larry Fergusson.
- Mixed by Peter McCabe, Larry Ferguson and Ralph Sall.
- Assistants: Ian Bryan, Amado Carrasco, Carlos Castro, Jim Champagne Gabe Chiesa, Dave Cook, Caram Costanzo, Jeff deMorris, Dave Dysart, Andrew Garver, Brad Haehnel, Richard Hijredia, Leslie Ann Jones, Jeffrey Lane, Eddie Miller, Jonathan Mooney. Carl Nappa, Luis Quine, Adam Rhodes, Rail Rogut, Mi Hael Scotella, Dave Schiffman, Krish Sharma, Bill Smith, Rick Roone, Mark Yeend, and Adam Zimmerman.
- Mastered by Stephen Marcussen at Precision Mastering, Los Angeles, California.
- A&R Direction for MCA Records: Ron Oberman and Beth Halper
- Project Coordinators: Candi Tobaben and Jeanne Venton
- Liner Notes/Art Direction: Ralph Sall
- Design: Lisa Sutton
- Front Cover Illustration: Glenn Barr
- Tray Card Illustration: Andrew Davis
- Back Cover Illustration: Gary Panter
- Saturday Morning Logo: Bongo Tone, Inc.

== Certifications ==
Region	Certification	Certified units/sales
United States (RIAA)	Gold	500,000^{^}
^{^} Shipments figures based on certification alone.

== Sources ==
- Saturday Morning: Cartoons' Greatest Hits at AllMusic
