= Lidsville =

1971–72 American children's television series

- Created by: Sid and Marty Krofft
- Starring: Butch Patrick; Charles Nelson Reilly; Billie Hayes
- Voices of: Lennie Weinrib; Joan Gerber; Walker Edmiston
- Country of origin: United States
- No. of episodes: 17

Production
- Producer: Sid and Marty Krofft
- Running time: 25 minutes (per episode)
- Production company: Sid & Marty Krofft Television Productions

Original release
- Network: ABC
- Release: September 11, 1971 – January 1, 1972

Lidsville is an American television show created by brothers Sid and Marty Krofft. It was their third series, following H.R. Pufnstuf (1969) and The Bugaloos (1970). As did its predecessors, Lidsville combined two types of characters: conventional actors in makeup alongside performers in full mascot costumes, whose voices were dubbed in post-production. Seventeen episodes aired on Saturday mornings on ABC during 1971–1973. The show was rebroadcast on NBC Saturday mornings the following season.

The opening was shot at Six Flags Over Texas. Otherwise, the show was shot at Paramount Pictures film studio in Los Angeles.

== Production ==
Like predecessors H.R. Pufnstuf and The Bugaloos, Lidsville ran for only one season (1971–1972), with reruns airing the following year (1972–1973).

Like most children's television shows of its era, Lidsville contained a laugh track.

== Plot ==
The show involved a teenage boy named Mark (portrayed by Butch Patrick) who fell into the top hat of Merlo the Magician (portrayed by Charles Nelson Reilly) (HooDoo's alter ego), following Merlo's show at Six Flags Over Texas. Inside the hat, he arrived in Lidsville, a land of living hats that are depicted as having the same characteristics as the humans who would normally wear them. For example, a cowboy hat would act and speak like a cowboy. The characters' houses were also hat-shaped.

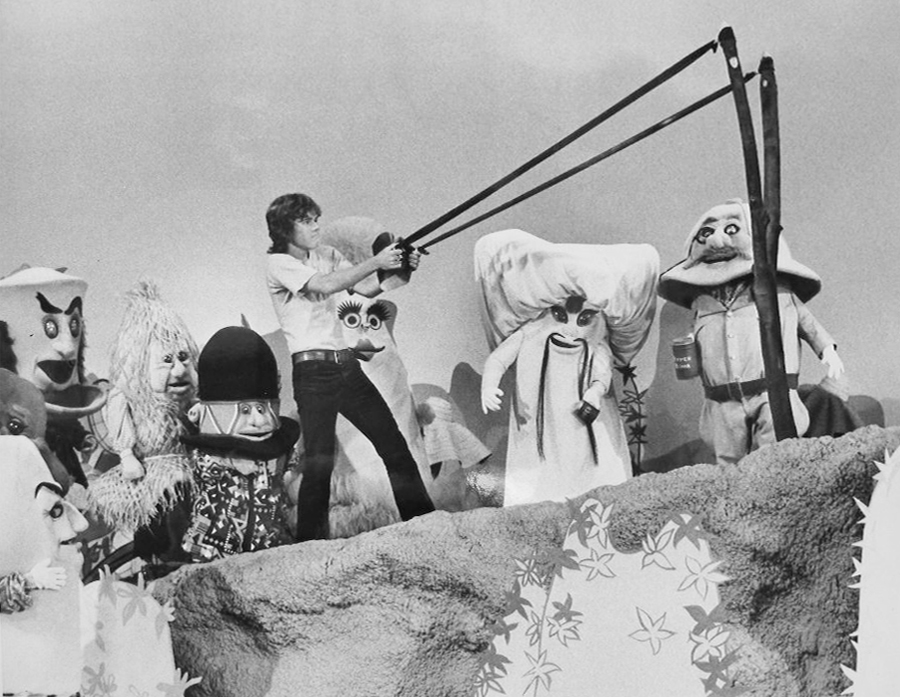
Mark (Butch Patrick) helps the hats defeat HooDoo.

The villain of the show was magician Horatio J. HooDoo (also portrayed by Reilly). The vain, short-tempered, but somewhat naive HooDoo flew around in his Hatamaran, blasting the good citizens of Lidsville with bolts of magic (referred to as "zapping") and keeping them in fear, demanding that they pay him their Hat Tax. Mark was seen as a suspected spy against HooDoo on behalf of the good hat people and was captured at Derby Dunes by HooDoo's minions the Bad Hats the moment he had fallen into the world of Lidsville. He escapes from his clutches alongside a genie named Weenie (Billie Hayes). Mark helped the good hats resist as he attempted to find a way back home. HooDoo, trying to reclaim control of Weenie the Genie from Mark, often enlisted the services of four Bad Hats.

In his high hat home, HooDoo was constantly besieged by the taunting music of his Hat Band, as well as all of his talking knickknacks (Parrot, Mr. Skull, mounted alligator head, the sawed-in-half lady, etc.). HooDoo also experienced further aggravation at the hands of his aides, the dimwitted Raunchy Rabbit and his two-faced card guard Jack of Clubs. HooDoo watched the action going on in downtown Lidsville from his hat home by using his Evil Eye, a device similar to a TV set that resembled an eyeball. He also had a hot chatline phone. The show relied on an endless array of puns based on hats. One such pun was "Derby Dunes", an area in Lidsville which sand dunes were shaped like derby hats.

Many of the episodes were about Mark trying to get back home, but the evil HooDoo prevented him from leaving. Weenie, being a nervous bumbler, was in fact a genie, but many of the tricks and spells did not work correctly after having been HooDoo's captive for so long.

In the show's final episode, scenes from some of the past episodes were featured as HooDoo's mother (portrayed by an uncredited Muriel Landers) had paid a visit to find out what has been going on in Lidsville while making sure that her son is still bad.

As the show only ran one season of original episodes, Mark never returned home—his fate remained unresolved.

Music was also a part of the show, with songs being performed by the characters in several episodes.

== Characters ==
- Mark (portrayed by Butch Patrick) – A teenage boy who serves as the main protagonist of the series. He fell into the hat of Merlo the Magician and ended up in Lidsville.
- Weenie the Genie (portrayed by Billie Hayes) – A genie who befriends Mark. Weenie is an example of Billie Hayes playing a male role.
- Horatio J. HooDoo (portrayed by Charles Nelson Reilly) – An evil magician who serves as the primary antagonist of the series. Most of his plans involve trying to prevent Mark from leaving Lidsville and attempting to reclaim Weenie.
  - Raunchy Rabbit (performed by Sharon Baird, voiced by Walker Edmiston impersonating Frank Fontaine) – A dimwitted rabbit who serves as Horatio J. HooDoo's henchman. Wears a fez
  - Jack of Clubs (voiced by Walker Edmiston impersonating Frank Nelson) – A walking deck of playing cards with a Jack-of Clubs as the face card. Wears a clubbed crown. Both top and bottom heads can talk.
- The Bad Hats – A group of four hats who work for HooDoo.
  - Mr. Big (performed by Angelo Rossitto, voiced by Lennie Weinrib) – A gangster fedora who is the leader of the Bad Hats. Despite his name, he is one of the shortest of the Bad Hats.
  - Captain Hooknose (voiced by Lennie Weinrib) – A pirate hat. Literally has a hook in place of a nose.
  - Bela (voiced by Walker Edmiston impersonating Béla Lugosi) – A vampire hat. A bat-eared top hat with a fanged brim on top of a cowl-like body.
  - Boris (performed by Jerry Maren, voiced by Walker Edmiston impersonating Peter Lorre) – An executioner's hood. Usually carries an axe. Also referred to as "Eggbert" or "Chauncey" throughout the series.
- Imperial Wizard (voiced by Walker Edmiston) – The Imperial Wizard is an evil wizard who is HooDoo's master.
- Rah-Rah (performed by Sharon Baird and sometimes Jerry Maren, voiced by Lennie Weinrib) – A football helmet. "Dumb Jock" persona, but often comes through in a pinch.
- Madame Ring-a-Ding (performed by Sharon Baird, voiced by Joan Gerber) – A party hat with a party favor nose who serves as Lidsville's social director.
- Mother Wheels (voiced by Joan Gerber) – An elderly, grey-haired motorcycle helmet dressed in black leather and usually on a motorcycle. Her catchphrase is "Hiya, Hon-ees".
- Nursie (performed by Joy Campbell, voiced by Joan Gerber) – A bespectacled nurse's hat who is the closest thing Lidsville has to a doctor.
- Twirly (performed by Joy Campbell, voiced by Joan Gerber) – A beanie hat. Apparently the youngest member of the cast, he speaks with a little boy voice and can use his propeller to fly.
- Colonel Poom (performed by Felix Silla, voiced by Lennie Weinrib in a British accent) – A pith helmet who is the unofficial leader of the good hats. Colonel Poom is an old hunter/explorer.
- Mr. Chow (voiced by Lennie Weinrib in a Chinese accent) – A chef's toque with a long Manchurian moustache. Lidsville's top cook/baker.
- Pierre LeSewer (puppeteered by Van Snowden, voiced by Lennie Weinrib in a French accent) – One of the few good hats who is human. Lives in the Lidsville sewers and pops his head out from under the manhole covers which resemble French berets. It was never explained why he cannot leave the sewers.
- Scorchy (voiced by Joan Gerber) – A talking, walking, fire hydrant with a long hose for a nose who wears a firefighter's hat. He serves as Lidsville's warning system.
- Tex (voiced by Lennie Weinrib impersonating John Wayne) – A cowboy hat.
- Tonsilini (performed by Van Snowden, voiced by Lennie Weinrib) – An opera-singing hat. Sings every line of his dialogue.
- Hiram (performed by Buddy Douglas, voiced by Walker Edmiston) – A farmer's straw hat.
  - Little Ben (voiced by Joan Gerber) – A talking piglet that is usually carried by Hiram.
- Admiral Scuttlebutt (voiced by Walker Edmiston) – A green admiral's bicorne. Talks in old naval cliches.
- Big Chief Sitting Duck (voiced by Walker Edmiston) – A feathered Indian chief's hat. His body is covered by a thick Indian blanket.
- Bruce HooDoo (portrayed by Charles Nelson Reilly) – is the twin brother of Horatio J. HooDoo.
- Wilhelmina W. Witchiepoo (portrayed by Billie Hayes) – The primary antagonist of the series H.R. Pufnstuf.
- Mommy HooDoo (portrayed by Muriel Landers) - HooDoo's mother who comes to visit in the finale.
- H.R. Pufnstuf (portrayed by Van Snowden, voiced by Lennie Weinrib) - The titular protagonist of the series H.R. Pufnstuf.

== Episodes ==
No.	Title	Original release date
1	"World in a Hat"	September 11, 1971
After falling into the magician's hat and discovering a magical world, Mark is mistaken for a spy by the tyrannical HooDoo and his cohorts including Weenie the good-natured genie.
2	"Show Me the Way to Go Home"	September 18, 1971
Colonel Poom navigates Mark and Weenie the Genie through the Hair Forest, the Shampoo River, and other exotic locales on their way to find The Golden Ladder. HooDoo and associates scramble to stop them and ultimately unleash Big Daddy HooDoo.
3	"Fly Now, Vacuum Later"	September 25, 1971
When Mark attempts a getaway by magic carpet, HooDoo summons a giant vacuum cleaner to swallow the boy, leaving it up to Weenie to mount a rescue.
4	"Weenie, Weenie, Where's Our Genie?"	October 2, 1971
When Weenie runs away, HooDoo kidnaps Nursie and Scorchy and holds them for ransom until the genie is returned.
5	"Let's Hear it for Whizzo"	October 9, 1971
HooDoo evicts the residents of Lidsville, so Mark disguises himself as a rival wizard and challenges HooDoo to a duel.
6	"Is There a Mayor in the House?"	October 16, 1971
Mark suggests the citizens elect a mayor, so HooDoo goes out of his way to rig the election.
7	"Take Me to Your Rabbit"	October 23, 1971
Raunchy Rabbit takes control of HooDoo's magical powers after they're struck by lightning.
8	"Have I Got a Girl For HooDoo"	October 30, 1971
HooDoo uses a Lonely Hearts Club to land a date with Wilhelmina W. Witchiepoo from H.R. Pufnstuf, so Mark summons his feminine wiles and tries to break them up.
9	"Mark and the Beanstalk"	November 6, 1971
When a magic beanstalk sprouts in Lidsville, HooDoo disguises himself as Mark and attempts to escape to the real world.
10	"Turn in Your Turban, You're Through"	November 13, 1971
HooDoo gives Mark Weenie's magic powers and uses the boy as his personal servant.
11	"Alias, the Imperial Wizard"	November 20, 1971
HooDoo crashes Weenie's birthday party and kidnaps several good hat people to plan a party for the Imperial Wizard.
12	"A Little HooDoo Goes a Long Way"	November 27, 1971
The Bad Hats plot to overthrow Hoo Doo. Meanwhile, Weenie comes down with the Ali Baba Virus.
13	"Oh, Brother"	December 4, 1971
HooDoo's good-natured twin brother Bruce arrives while he's away and causes great confusion in Lidsville.
14	"HooDoo Who?"	December 11, 1971
The Bad Hats run amok when HooDoo comes down with amnesia.
15	"The Old Hat Home"	December 18, 1971
HooDoo crashes the good hat people's charity event and turns them all into senior citizens.
16	"The Great Brain Robbery"	December 25, 1971
HooDoo plays the pied piper and lures the good hat people into his Brain Wash machine to create an army to conquer the Imperial Wizard.
17	"Mommy Hoo Doo"	January 1, 1972
In this clip show, Hoo Doo's mother comes to Lidsville while her son is away and all of the inhabitants try to convince her that Hoo Doo is still as bad as he ever was.

== Home media ==
A three-disc complete series set was released on DVD in the United States in January 2005 by Rhino Entertainment. The set contained all seventeen episodes in digitally remastered, uncut and original broadcast form, plus interviews with Charles Nelson Reilly, Butch Patrick, and Billie Hayes. They and the Krofft brothers also provided audio commentary on some of the episodes.

== Comics ==
Gold Key Comics published five issues of a Lidsville comic book from October 1972 to October 1973. The books were a mix of new stories as well as re-workings of some of the television episodes.

== Other media ==
- Characters from Lidsville were featured in the Ice Capades during the early 1970s.
- The show was parodied by HBO late night comedy program Mr. Show.
- Several audio samples from Lidsville can be heard in the song "Dope Hat" on Marilyn Manson's 1994 album Portrait of an American Family.
- At the beginning of "Jose Chung's 'Doomsday Defense'", an episode of Millennium, the writer Chung (played by Charles Nelson Reilly), mentions that he had a part in a "brilliant, award-winning film" as a small clip of HooDoo is played on-screen.
- In the episode "Space Race, Part 2" of the FX comedy Archer, Cheryl references the show when Malory retorts that Cheryl is "not fit to be queen of... name a place," Cheryl replies with Lidsville.

=== Film ===
On January 31, 2011, it was announced that DreamWorks Animation was adapting Lidsville to make a 3-D animated musical. The feature would be directed by Conrad Vernon, and the music would be composed by Alan Menken, known for composing multiple musical scores for Walt Disney Animation Studios films. Menken stated that, "The songs will be an homage to '60s psychedelic concept-album rock." In January 2013, he posted on Twitter that "Lidsville is underway... Finally." The lyrics would be written by Glenn Slater, a frequent Menken collaborator. In June 2016, Sid Krofft said in an interview about the project: "It was going to be like Hair or Tommy, a full-blown musical. But they went in a strange direction and it just didn't work."

== See also ==
- Hattytown Tales, a 1969 animated British television series whose characters are talking hats
