= The Bugaloos =

1970–71 American children's television series

- Title card
- Genre: Children's television series Comedy
- Created by: Sid and Marty Krofft
- Starring: John McIndoe; Caroline Ellis; John Philpott; Wayne Laryea; Martha Raye; Billy Barty; Sharon Baird; Joy Campbell; Van Snowden
- Voices of: Walker Edmiston; Joan Gerber
- Country of origin: United States
- No. of seasons: 1
- No. of episodes: 17 (list of episodes)

Production
- Producer: Sid and Marty Krofft
- Running time: 22 min (per episode)
- Production company: Sid & Marty Krofft Television Productions

Original release
- Network: NBC
- Release: September 12, 1970 – September 2, 1972

The Bugaloos is an American children's television series, produced by brothers Sid and Marty Krofft, that aired on NBC on Saturday mornings from 1970 to 1972. Reruns of the show aired in daily syndication from 1978 to 1985 as part of the "Krofft Superstars" package with six other Krofft series. The show features a musical group composed of four British teenagers in insect-themed outfits, constantly beset by the evil machinations of the talent-challenged Benita Bizarre, played by comedian Martha Raye.

== Premise ==
The show takes place in the fantasy setting of Tranquility Forest. The central characters are four British teenage musicians who've formed a pop band named the Bugaloos. The foursome are human-bug hybrids (they appear as mostly human with antennae and wings). While occasionally seen air-surfing on leaves, they often fly unaided. On the ground, the Bugaloos are sometimes seen traveling around in their "Bugaloo Buggy", a colorful dune buggy custom-made for the show by car builder George Barris. Other bands mentioned in the show include Blood, Sweat & Soap and the Electric Spinach.

Peace-loving and hippie-like, the Bugaloos are pursued by the feathered yet flightless Benita Bizarre, who envies the Bugaloos' ability to fly as much as their ability to create good music.

== Characters ==
=== The Bugaloos ===
The Bugaloos and Sparky in Tranquility Forest

- Joy (portrayed by Caroline Ellis) – A butterfly who plays percussion and also sings lead and backup vocals.
- I.Q. (portrayed by John McIndoe) – A grasshopper who plays the guitar and sings lead vocals.
- Harmony (portrayed by Wayne Laryea) – A bumblebee who plays the keyboard and sings backup vocals.
- Courage (portrayed by John Philpott) – A ladybug who plays the drums and sings backup vocals.

=== Villains ===
- Benita Bizarre (portrayed by Martha Raye) – A jealous, untalented, unattractive, old crone who is the main antagonist of the series who sports a feathered outfit. Benita lives in a gigantic jukebox and uses it to broadcast her own brand of blaring, obnoxious, unpleasant "music". A dreadful singer, Benita is furious at the popularity of the Bugaloos' more melodic, upbeat sound. Pitting her technology against their nature, she plots elaborate, unsuccessful schemes to either destroy or enslave them, frequently making use of a powerful sonic weapon called the Stereo Zapper which renders its victim unconscious in seconds. In Episode 2, she steals Joy Bugaloo's voice. In Episode 6, she almost succeeds in amputating I.Q.'s wings with the aim of achieving flight herself. Happily, her schemes never cause permanent harm. Raye also appeared the same year in the H.R. Pufnstuf movie as the Boss Witch, which led to her getting the role of Benita.
  - Funky Rat (performed by Sharon Baird, voiced by Walker Edmiston) – Benita's German-accented chauffeur and chief flunky. The Funky Rat costume was also used for essentially the same role as Boss Witch's chauffeur Heinrich Rat in Pufnstuf.
  - Woofer and Tweeter (performed by Joy Campbell and Van Snowden, voiced by Walker Edmiston and Joan Gerber) – Two anthropomorphic stereo speakers who are Benita's two bumbling, sycophantic henchmen.

=== Supporting characters ===
- Sparky (performed by Billy Barty, voiced by Walker Edmiston) – A firefly whom the Bugaloos took in.
- Nutty Bird (voiced by Walker Edmiston) – A local messenger who periodically delivers messages to and from the Bugaloos.
- Peter Platter (voiced by Walker Edmiston) – A DJ for radio station KOOK in nearby Rock City.
  - Mike (voiced by Joan Gerber) – Peter Platters's smart-alecky talking microphone.
- Magico The Magician (voiced by Walker Edmiston impersonating Ed Wynn) – A frog magician and hypnotist extraordinaire.
- Gina Lolawattage (voiced by Joan Gerber impersonating Mae West) – A firefly singer and actress who becomes smitten with her #1 fan Sparky.
- Bluebell Flower (voiced by Joan Gerber) – A giant talking flower who alerts the Bugaloos of impending danger, such as Benita's latest schemes, serving as their "alarm bell".
- The Grapevine (voiced by Joan Gerber and Walker Edmiston) – A bunch of talking grapes on a vine who aid Bluebell in giving the Bugaloos the latest bad news (a visual take on the hit Motown song "I Heard it Through the Grapevine").

== Episodes ==
No.	Title	Directed by	Written by	Original release date
1	"Firefly, Light My Fire"	Tony Charmoli	Si Rose and John Fenton Murray	September 12, 1970
The Bugaloos rescue a neurotic firefly named Sparky after he is sideswiped by Benita Bizarre's Baroque Buggy.
2	"The Great Voice Robbery"	Tony Charmoli	John Fenton Murray	September 19, 1970
Benita swaps her voice with Joy's using her Audio Dynamic Voice Switcher.
3	"Our Home Is Our Hassle"	Tony Charmoli	Jack Raymond	September 26, 1970
Determined to win Peter Platter's song contest, Benita moves into the Bugaloos' home in Tranqulity Forest to find musical inspiration.
4	"Courage, Come Home"	Tony Charmoli	John Fenton Murray	October 3, 1970
Benita takes advantage of Courage after he suffers amnesia, convincing him he is her nephew, Melvin Bizarre.
5	"The Love Bugaloos"	Tony Charmoli	Elon E. Packard Jr.	October 10, 1970
The Bugaloos play Cupid for the shy Sparky when he falls in love with singer and female firefly Gina Lolawattage.
6	"If I Had the Wings of a Bugaloo"	Tony Charmoli	John Fenton Murray	October 17, 1970
Wishing to fly like the Bugaloos, Benita disguises herself as Hetty Hoedown to steal I.Q.'s wings for herself.
7	"Lady, You Don't Look Eighty"	Tony Charmoli	John Fenton Murray	October 24, 1970
A misunderstanding causes Benita to believe the teenaged Joy is actually 80 years of age.
8	"Benita, the Beautiful?"	Tony Charmoli	John Fenton Murray	October 31, 1970
Benita devises a plot to win Peter Platter's beauty contest.
9	"Now You See 'Em, Now You Don't"	Tony Charmoli	Elon E. Packard Jr.	November 7, 1970
The Bugaloos turn themselves invisible after Benita adopts Sparky in a plan to take credit for his new song.
10	"Help Wanted — Firefly"	Tony Charmoli	Warren S. Murray	November 14, 1970
The Bugaloos come to Sparky's aid after he takes the fall for Benita's act of radio station sabotage.
11	"On a Clear Day"	Tony Charmoli	John Fenton Murray	November 21, 1970
Benita pumps smog into Tranquility Forest in an effort to drive the audience away from a Bugaloos concert and over to her own.
12	"Today, I'm a Firefly"	Tony Charmoli	Jack Raymond	November 28, 1970
Sparky finally learns to fly and he quickly puts his skills to good use, rescuing the Bugaloos after they are shrunk and trapped inside a music box.
13	"The Bugaloos Bugaboo"	Tony Charmoli	Maurice Richlin	December 5, 1970
Disguised as an agent, Benita tricks Sparky into writing a song for her to perform at Peter Platter's "Battle of the Bands" concert.
14	"Benita's Double Trouble"	Tony Charmoli	Warren S. Murray	December 12, 1970
Benita kidnaps Peter Platter and takes over as DJ, but I.Q. disguises himself as Benita in an attempt to foil her scheme.
15	"Circus Time at Benita's"	Tony Charmoli	John Fenton Murray	December 19, 1970
Benita interferes with the Bugaloos' plan to hold a circus by kidnapping Magico the Magnificent.
16	"The Uptown 500"	Tony Charmoli	John Fenton Murray	December 26, 1970
Used-car dealer Way Out Wheeler stages an auto race, pitting the Bugaloos against Benita. The stakes are raised, however, when she kidnaps Sparky and threatens to harm him if the Bugaloos win.
17	"The Good Old Days"	Tony Charmoli	Warren S. Murray	January 2, 1971
Benita buys Tranquility Forest and evicts the Bugaloos. But Joy, disguised as a fortune teller, tries to show Benita the error of her ways through a series of clips from previous episodes.

== Production and airing ==
Touted as the British version of The Monkees, The Bugaloos attracted more than 5,000 young actors and actresses to audition in spring 1970 for the show's four lead roles, each having to demonstrate aptitude in dance, singing and acting.

Among those auditioning were Elton John's future manager John Reid and Phil Collins, who joined the art rock band Genesis later that year. Reid and Collins were two of the three finalists for the role of "I.Q." given to Scottish musician John McIndoe. "If one of those guys had gotten it instead of me, rock-'n'-roll history might have changed," McIndoe later joked. "Whenever I see them, I say, 'Hey guys, you were lucky you didn't get the part'."

The show was taped in Los Angeles, California. Seventeen episodes of the series were produced. Like its predecessor, H. R. Pufnstuf (1969), The Bugaloos ran for only one season (1970–1971) on NBC, with reruns airing the following year (1971–1972). Following production of the first season, the Kroffts tried shooting for a second season and also had a movie deal in the works with Columbia Pictures. However, miscommunication with the actors resulted in their returning to the UK that December against the Kroffts' wishes. As a result, a potential second season was ultimately scrapped, along with plans for a movie which was shelved due to the bankruptcy of Columbia Pictures.

Although the show featured British actors, it was not widely screened in the U.K.. For example, Yorkshire Television and Tyne-Tees Television transmitted the series at lunchtime on Saturdays from late 1971 to early 1972.

The Bugaloos was fitted with an adult laugh track, as was common practice at the time — the inclusion of which the Kroffts were initially against. Sid Krofft commented "We were sort of against that, but Si Rose — being in sitcoms — he felt that when the show was put together that the children would not know when to laugh." Marty Krofft added "the bottom line — it's sad — you gotta tell them when it's funny. And the laugh track, (Si) was right. It was necessary, as much as we were always looking to have a real laugh track, a real audience. In comedies, if you don't have them (laugh track), you're in big trouble, because if you don't hear a laugh track, it's not funny. And that's the way the audience (at home) was programmed to view these shows." When discussing the show's production techniques for the DVD commentary track in 2006, series stars Caroline Ellis and John Philpott addressed the laugh track. "I was never one for the American canned laughter, because sometimes it's too much," said Ellis. She added, however, that it does help in creating "the atmosphere for the reaction." Philpott added that, unlike their UK counterparts, US viewing audiences at the time had become accustomed to hearing laughter, saying, "I think you find yourself genuinely laughing more if you are prompted to laugh along with the canned laughter."

== Music ==
Bugaloos

Soundtrack album
- Released: 1970
- Label: Capitol
- Producer: Hal Yoergler

The show's music director was Hal Yoergler, who also wrote many of the show's songs and produced the Bugaloos album released in 1970. The title song's lyrics were written by Norman Gimbel, and its music was composed by Charles Fox. Gimbel and Fox were also the songwriters of "Killing Me Softly with His Song" and the theme songs to films and programs such as Last American Hero ("I Got a Name," sung by Jim Croce), Happy Days, Laverne and Shirley, and The New Adventures of Wonder Woman. A cover of the Bugaloos theme performed by Collective Soul is included on the 1995 tribute album Saturday Morning: Cartoons' Greatest Hits, produced by Ralph Sall for MCA Records.

The Bugaloos released an album in 1970 (Capitol Records ST-621), featuring studio-recorded versions of some of the songs performed on the show. The track list is as follows:

Side 1

1. "If You Become a Bugaloo"
2. "The Senses of Our World"
3. "For a Friend"
4. "Believe"
5. "It's New to You"

Side 2

1. "Fly Away With Us"
2. "Older Woman"
3. "Just the Memory Stays Around"
4. "Gna Gna Gna Gna Gna"
5. "Castles in the Air"
6. "The Bugaloos (Theme Song)"

One single was released in conjunction with the album: "For a Friend"/"The Senses of Our World" (Capitol 2946). "For a Friend" charted as a minor hit, appearing on Billboard the week of December 18, 1970, at No. 128.

The track "Just the Memory Stays Around" did not appear in any episode, and is available only on the LP. The LP was re-released on CD in January 2000 by Vivid Sound in Japan and in 2006 by Cherry Red Records of London.

The Bugaloos recorded 15 songs. In addition to the 11 that appear on the released album, four additional songs appeared on the television show, but remain unreleased:

1. "Sparky"
2. "I'm As Happy As Can Be"
3. "I Really Love You"
4. "Flicker Town"

== Home video ==
The complete Bugaloos series was released on DVD in May 2006 by Rhino Entertainment. The set contained all 17 digitally remastered, original uncut broadcast episodes, with audio commentary on the pilot episode from creator Sid Krofft and director Tony Charmoli. Cast members John Philpott, Caroline Ellis and John McIndoe also provided audio commentary on some episodes and participated in interviews. Also included were a video jukebox with a selection of songs from the episodes, a photo gallery and a Bugaloos Interactive I. Q. Test hosted by McIndoe.

== Proposed Revival ==
At Comic Con 2015, Sid and Marty Krofft revealed they were looking to create an updated version of The Bugaloos as a preschool television series. It was rumored Cyndi Lauper would portray Benita Bizarre. At 2017's Comic Con, they released a teaser trailer of the pilot produced for Nickelodeon with clips of the new series with Lise Simms as Benita Bizarre. However, during a May 2018 radio interview with creator Marty Krofft, Marty revealed that the pilot was not picked up by Nickelodeon and was scrapped. He said they were reshooting the pilot and that Randy Jackson will be involved with the music.

== In popular culture ==
The Bugaloos are the binding childhood memory that the two main protagonists in the 2000 film The Tao of Steve discover as they begin to bond, as Syd (Greer Goodman) and Dex (Donal Logue) find out that they both had Bugaloos stickers on their respective childhood Josie and the Pussycats lunchboxes.

The Bugaloos' song "Senses of Our World" was sampled by the Chemical Brothers in their track "The Darkness That You Fear".

== See also ==
- The Monkees (1966–68)
- Kidd Video (1984–85)
