= Sharon Baird =

American actress (born 1943)

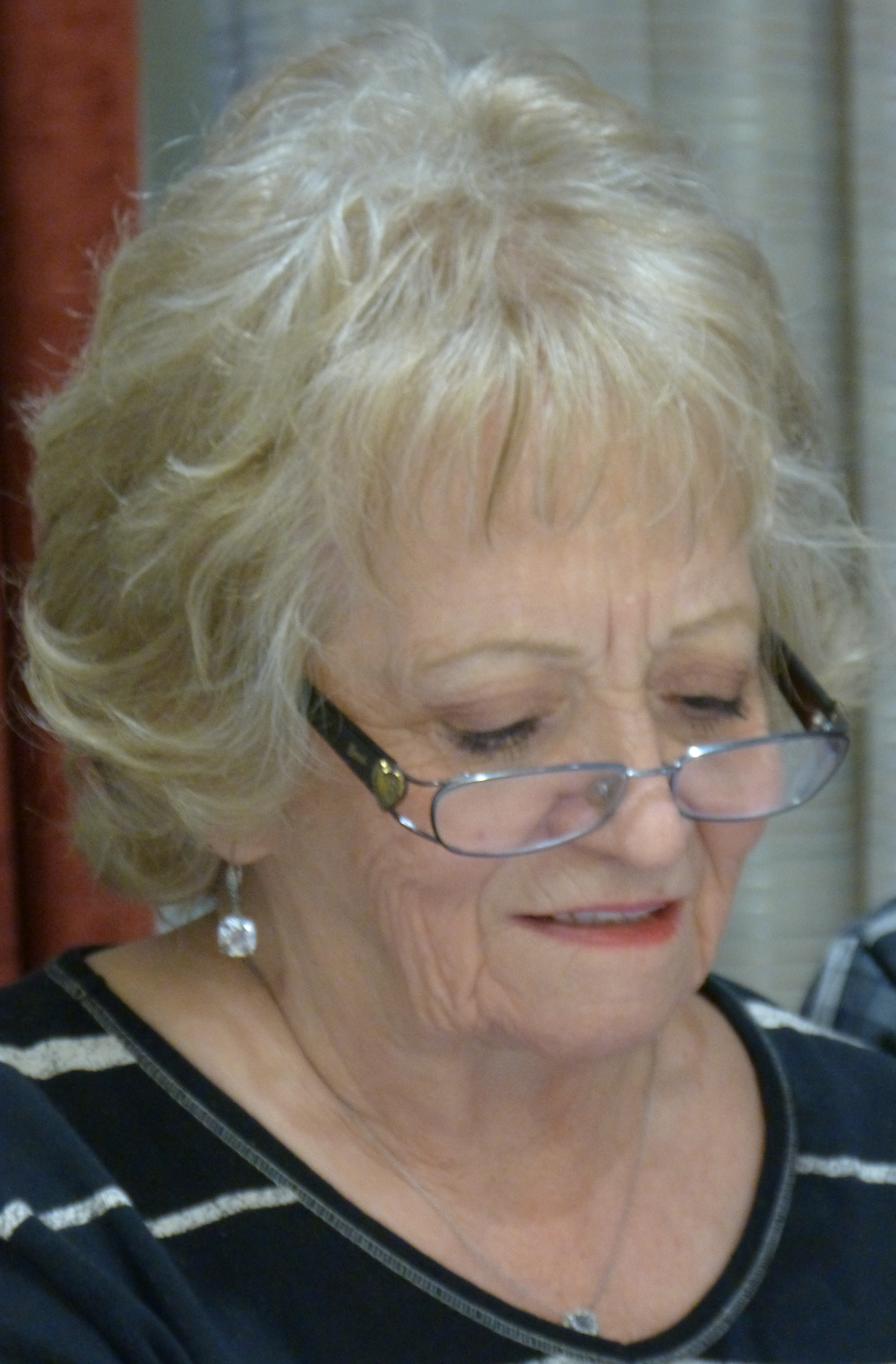
- Baird in 2015
- Born: August 16, 1943 (age 82); Seattle, Washington, U.S.
- Occupations: Actress; voice actress; singer; dancer; puppeteer
- Years active: 1950–present
- Spouse: Dalton Lee Thomas (m. 1964; div. 1972)

Sharon Baird (born August 16, 1943) is an American actress, voice actress, singer, dancer and puppeteer who is best known for having been a Mouseketeer.

== Early life ==
Baird began dance lessons at age three and won a "Little Miss Washington" contest at five. Her mother took her to California for the national competition and fell in love with the climate. The family relocated to Los Angeles, California, where Baird continued her dance lessons with Louis da Pron, among others.

She has one younger brother, Jimmy, also a former child actor.

== Career ==
Baird appeared in her first film, Bloodhounds of Broadway, in 1950. At age nine she began regular appearances on The Colgate Comedy Hour television show with Eddie Cantor. She did episodes of several different television shows, and an unbilled song-and-dance number with Dean Martin in Artists and Models (1955) (which also featured fellow Mouseketeer Nancy Abbate), just before being selected for the Mickey Mouse Club.

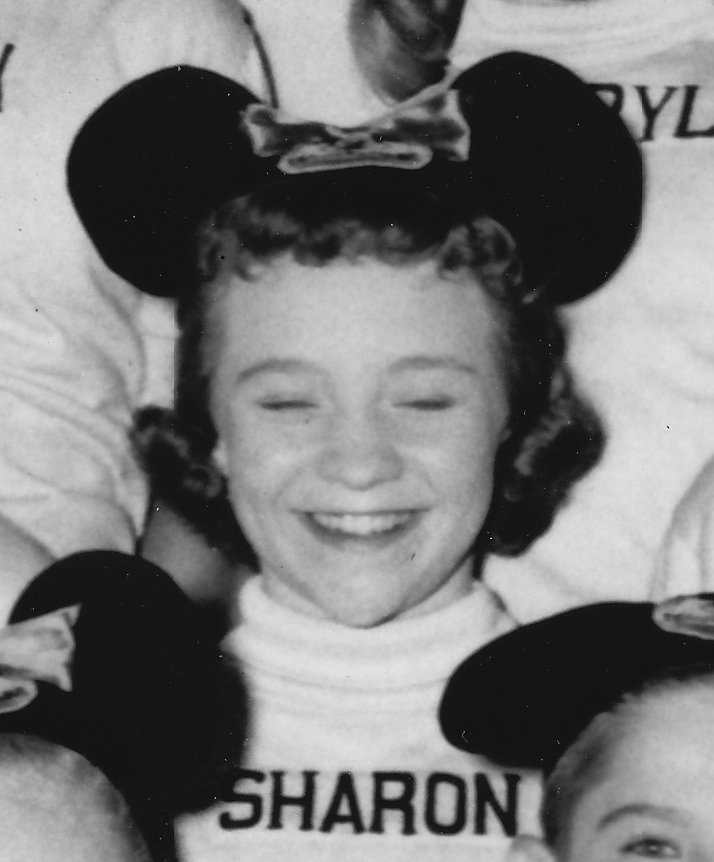
Baird as a Mouseketeer circa 1956

Contrary to the impression given by Disney publicity, many of the Mickey Mouse Club cast had some prior experience in films and television. Baird was among the most experienced of these professionals, and performed with the show's "Red Team", or first-string unit, for all three seasons of original programming (1955–1958). Her specialty was tap, but she did other forms of dancing, as well as singing and acting on the show.

After filming completed in 1958, Baird finished high school at Hollywood Professional School, then attended Los Angeles Valley College where she made the National Honor Society and was president of her class. She briefly interrupted her education in May 1959 for a short performing tour of Australia with the Mouseketeers, then graduated from college in 1963 with degrees in mathematics and secretarial science.

In 1964, Baird married singer Dalton Lee Thomas, and, with a male friend of his, worked up a nightclub act called "Two Cats and a Mouse", which faded out, along with the marriage, by 1969.

During the 1970s she worked extensively as a live "puppet" for Sid and Marty Krofft, among others, doing children's shows such as H.R. Pufnstuf, The Bugaloos, New Zoo Revue, Sigmund and the Sea Monsters and Land of the Lost. She did rotoscoping work for Ralph Bakshi's late seventies film The Lord of the Rings. She was the live-action model for the part of Frodo Baggins, for which she did not receive screen credit.

In 1980, Baird, along with the other Mouseketeers, did a television special for The Wonderful World of Disney, reprising her "tap dancing while jumping rope" routine. She then joined a smaller number of her colleagues in performing live shows at Disneyland on weekends for several years during the early 1980s.

== Later life ==
In 1984, Baird appeared on stage in the comedy special Gallagher: Over Your Head, doing a tap dancing routine and assisting Gallagher during his famous Sledge-O-Matic routine. For the critically panned cult film Ratboy, she played the title character under heavy makeup, being credited as S.L. Baird to hide her gender. Baird gradually ceased doing professional engagements in the 1990s. She later relocated from Southern California to Reno, Nevada.

== Film ==
- Bloodhounds of Broadway (1952) - Little Elida (uncredited)
- Artists and Models (1955) - Dancer (uncredited)
- Pufnstuf (1970) - Shirley Pufnstuf
- The Lord of the Rings (1978) - Model for Frodo Baggins
- Ratboy (1986) - Eugene / Ratboy (credited as S. L. Baird)

== Television ==
- Death Valley Days: 1 episode (1954) - Lotta Crabtree
- Disneyland: 3 episodes (1955–1957) - Mouseketeer Sharon
- The Mickey Mouse Club: (1955–1958) - Mouseketeer Sharon, also sang in 1 episode
- H.R. Pufnstuf (1969) - Lady Boyd, Judy Frog, Stupid Bat, Shirley Pufnstuf, Toadinov (Suit Performer or Voice)
- The Bugaloos (1970-1972) - Funky Rat, Peter Platter (Voices)
- Lidsville (1971) - Raunchy Rabbit (Suit Performer)
- New Zoo Revue series regular (1972) - Charlie the Owl
- Sigmund and the Sea Monsters (1973) - Big Daddy Ooze, Woman at Phone Booth
- Land of the Lost (1974-1975) - Sa (Voice)
- The Wonderful World of Disney: (1980) - Mouseketeer Sharon
- Dumbo's Circus (1985) - Lionel the Lion
- The Mother Goose Video Treasury (1987) - The Numbers Lady, Little Miss Muffett
- The Mickey Mouse Club Story (1995) - Herself
