= Walker Edmiston =

American actor (1926–2007)

- Born: February 6, 1926; St. Louis, Missouri, U.S.
- Died: February 15, 2007 (aged 81); Woodland Hills, Los Angeles, California, U.S.
- Other name: Walter Edmiston
- Occupations: Actor; puppeteer
- Years active: 1947–2006
- Spouse: Evelyn Edmiston (m. 1950; died 1998)
- Children: 2

Walker Robert Edmiston (February 6, 1926 – February 15, 2007) was an American actor and puppeteer.

== Early years ==
Walker Edmiston was born in St. Louis, Missouri, on February 6, 1926, to William Sherman Edmiston (1894–1976) and Anna Edmiston (née Anderson, 1887–1967). Edmiston participated in local theater productions during his high school years. He later studied at the Pasadena Playhouse.

== Career ==
In the 1950s, Edmiston worked on puppet shows on KTLA-TV in Los Angeles. His voice was heard on the puppet programs The Buffalo Billy Show and Time for Beany and on Dumbo's Circus, which included live action and animation. He was also a member of the cast of Lidsville and voiced characters on Pandamonium. He appeared in character roles on several TV programs during the 1950s through the '70s, including the Star Trek episode “The Corbomite Maneuver” as the voice of Balok. He also appeared in Gunsmoke, Mission: Impossible, Knots Landing, Adam-12, The Bob Newhart Show and The Dukes of Hazzard. He also played a character based on "Chester" in "Gun-Shy," the Maverick parody of Gunsmoke starring James Garner. In 1966, Edmiston had a recurring role as Regan in the short-lived ABC comedy western series The Rounders with co-stars Ron Hayes, Patrick Wayne, and Chill Wills.

Edmiston also did many television commercials and animated character voices, such as Ernie the elf in hundreds of commercials for the cookie products of the Keebler Company, and voices for characters on H.R. Pufnstuf and The Bugaloos from the studios of Sid and Marty Krofft, as well as a recurring role as Enik the Altrusian in Land of the Lost. He also did many character voices on the Focus on the Family radio program, Adventures in Odyssey, in which he played Tom Riley, Bart Rathbone, and numerous other one-shot characters for more than twenty years. Following Edmiston's death, both characters were retired from the show.

Some of his voice credits were under the stage name Walter Edmiston. In 1985, he voiced the Autobot Inferno in The Transformers.

In the 1950s and early 1960s, he hosted The Walker Edmiston Show, a children's television program in Los Angeles, California. The program featured puppets of his own creation including Kingsley the Lion, Ravenswood the Buzzard, and Callie the Cat.

In 1962, Edmiston and his family moved to Phoenix, Arizona, where he began a daily puppet show on KOOL-TV. He was also a stage director at Children's Theater in Phoenix.

== Personal life and death ==
Edmiston married Evelyn in 1950, and together they had two children, daughters Andria and Erin. Evelyn died in 1998.

Edmiston died from cancer in Woodland Hills, California on February 15, 2007. He was cremated at Hollywood Forever Cemetery. His urn was entombed in a columbarium within the Abbey of Psalms Mausoleum afterwards.

== Filmography ==
=== Television ===
| Year | Title | Role | Notes |
|---|---|---|---|
| 1962 | The Flintstones | J. Montague Gypsum (voice) | Episode: "This Is Your Lifesaver" |
| 1966–1968 | Star Trek: The Original Series | Balok, SS Deirdre, Provider (voice) | 3 episodes |
| 1967 | The Monkees | Newspaper Publisher | Episode: "Monkee Mayor" |
| 1967 | The Wild Wild West | Preacher | Episode: "The Night of the Turncoat" |
| 1969–1970 | H.R. Pufnstuf | Various voices | 17 episodes |
| 1970–1971 | The Bugaloos | Various voices | 17 episodes |
| 1971 | Bonanza | Auctioneer | Episode: "Cassie" |
| 1971–1973 | Lidsville | Various voices | 17 episodes |
| 1972 | Mission: Impossible | Peter Wiley | Episode: "Casino" |
| 1973–1975 | Sigmund and the Sea Monsters | Sigmund (voice) | Main cast |
| 1974 | Live Again, Die Again | Larry Brice | ABC Movie of the Week |
| 1974–1976 | Land of the Lost | Enik, Jefferson Collie | 16 episodes |
| 1975 | Trilogy of Terror | Zuni Warrior Doll (voice) | ABC Movie of the Week; uncredited |
| 1977–1982 | Little House on the Prairie | Mr. Deerling, Dr. Moore, Mr. Stohler, Dr. Vanderan | 4 episodes |
| 1977 | The Bob Newhart Show | Sergeant Webber | Episode: "Desperate Sessions" |
| 1977 | The Waltons | Franklin D. Roosevelt, Edward Murrow | Episode: "The Hiding Place" |
| 1981–1984 | The Dukes of Hazzard | Professor Crandall | 2 episodes |
| 1981 | Buck Rogers in the 25th Century | Koldar (voice) | Episode: "The Dorian Secret" |
| 1981 | Spider-Man | Magneto (voice) | Episode: "When Magneto Speaks... People Listen" |
| 1981 | Spider-Man and His Amazing Friends | Kingpin, Frankenstein's Monster (voice) | 2 episodes |
| 1982 | Pandamonium | Algeron (voice) | 13 episodes |
| 1985–1986 | Dumbo's Circus | Sebastian (voice) | 82 episodes |
| 1985–1986 | The Transformers | Inferno (voice) | 17 episodes |
| 1987–2006 | Adventures in Odyssey | Bart Rathbone, Tom Riley (voice) | 27 episodes |
| 1988 | ABC Weekend Special | Catso (voice) | Episode: "Runaway Ralph" |
| 1989–1991 | Adventures of the Gummi Bears | Sir Thornberry (voice) | 6 episodes |
| 1997 | Spider-Man: The Animated Series | Robert Frank / Whizzer (voice) | 3 episodes |
| 2006 | Ben 10 | Marty, Ice Cream Employee (voice) | Episode: "Permanent Retirement" |
| 2006 | Avatar: The Last Airbender | Fire Lord Azulon (voice) | Episode: "Zuko Alone" |

=== Film ===
| Year | Title | Role | Notes |
|---|---|---|---|
| 1947 | Smoked Hams | Wally Walrus (voice) | Uncredited |
| 1954 | By Word of Mouse | Lecturer (voice) | Uncredited |
| 1961 | Everything's Ducky | Scuttlebutt (voice) | |
| 1962 | Hitler | S.S. Man | Uncredited |
| 1965 | The Beach Girls and the Monster | Mark | |
| 1966 | Stagecoach | Cheyenne Wells Fargo Agent | Uncredited |
| 1968 | The Green Berets | Lt. Moore | Uncredited |
| 1970 | Pufnstuf | Various voices | |
| 1971 | Escape from the Planet of the Apes | Gorilla, Milo (voice) | Uncredited |
| 1971 | One More Train to Rob | Engineer | Uncredited |
| 1971 | Willy Wonka & the Chocolate Factory | Mr. Slugworth, Mr. Wilkinson (voice) | Uncredited |
| 1974 | Down and Dirty Duck | Old Prospector (voice) | |
| 1980 | Wholly Moses! | God (voice) | |
| 1981 | Scared to Death | Dennis Warren | |
| 1984 | The Bear | Dr. Rose | |
| 1986 | The Transformers: The Movie | Inferno (voice) | Scenes deleted |
| 1986 | The Great Mouse Detective | Thug (voice) | |
| 1990 | Dick Tracy | Radio Announcer (voice) | |
| 1995 | Whisper of the Heart | Kita (voice) | English dub |
