= H.R. Pufnstuf =

1969–70 American children's television series

- Created by: Sid and Marty Krofft
- Directed by: Hollingsworth Morse
- Starring: Jack Wild; Billie Hayes
- Voices of: Lennie Weinrib; Joan Gerber; Walker Edmiston
- Country of origin: United States
- No. of seasons: 1
- No. of episodes: 17

Production
- Producer: Sid and Marty Krofft
- Running time: 25 minutes (per episode)
- Production company: Sid and Marty Krofft Television Productions

Original release
- Network: NBC
- Release: September 6 – December 27, 1969

H.R. Pufnstuf is an American children's television series created by Sid and Marty Krofft. It was the first independent live-action, life-sized-puppet program, following on from their work with Hanna-Barbera's program The Banana Splits Adventure Hour. The seventeen episodes were originally broadcast Saturday from September 6, 1969, to December 27, 1969. The broadcasts were successful enough that NBC kept it on the schedule as reruns until September 4, 1971. The show was shot at Paramount Studios and its opening was shot at Big Bear Lake, California. Reruns returned on ABC Saturday morning from September 2, 1972, to September 8, 1973, and on Sunday mornings in some markets from September 16, 1973, to September 8, 1974. It was syndicated by itself from September 1974 to June 1978 and in a package with six other Krofft series under the banner Krofft Superstars from 1978 to 1985. Reruns of the show were featured on TV Land in 1999 as part of its Super Retrovision Saturdaze Saturday morning-related overnight prime programming block and in the summer of 2004 as part of its TV Land Kitschen weekend late-night prime programming block, and it was later shown on MeTV from 2014 until 2016.

In 2004 and 2007, H.R. Pufnstuf was ranked No. 22 and No. 27 respectively on TV Guide's Top Cult Shows Ever.

Fast food chain McDonald's later emulated aspects of the series for its long-running advertising campaign "McDonaldland", and the company was successfully sued by the Krofft brothers in 1977 for copyright infringement.

== Overview ==
The Kroffts created the H.R. Pufnstuf character for the HemisFair '68 World's Fair, where they produced a show called Kaleidoscope for the Coca-Cola pavilion. The character's name was Luther, and he became a mascot for the fair.

H.R. Pufnstuf introduced the Kroffts' most-used plot scenario of a fairy tale of good versus evil, as well as their second plot scenario of the stranger in a strange land. The show centered on a shipwrecked boy named Jimmy, portrayed by teenage actor Jack Wild. He is 11 years old when he arrives on the island and turns 12 in the episode called "The Birthday Party." Jimmy and a talking flute named Freddy take a ride on a mysterious boat, but the boat is actually owned by a wicked witch named Wilhelmina W. Witchiepoo (portrayed by Billie Hayes) who rides on a broomstick-vehicle called the Vroom Broom. She uses the boat to lure Jimmy and Freddy to her castle on Living Island, where she intends to take Jimmy prisoner and steal Freddy for her own purposes.

The Mayor of Living Island is a friendly and helpful anthropomorphic dragon named H.R. Pufnstuf, performed by Roberto Gamonet and voiced by the show's writer Lennie Weinrib, who also voiced many of the other characters. The dragon rescues Jimmy and protects him from Witchiepoo, as his cave is the only place where her magic has no effect.

All of the characters on Living Island were realized by large, cumbersome costumes or puppetry of anthropomorphic animals and objects. Everything was alive on the island, including houses, boats, clocks, candles, and so forth; virtually any part of the Living Island sets could become a character, usually voiced in a parody of a famous film star such as Mae West, Edward G. Robinson, or John Wayne.

== Characters ==
=== Main ===
- Jimmy (portrayed by Jack Wild) — An English boy who was lured to Living Island by an enchanted boat. Witchiepoo controlled the boat with the aim of stealing Jimmy's magic talking flute named Freddy.
- H.R. Pufnstuf (performed by Roberto Gamonet, voiced by Lennie Weinrib) — A friendly dragon who is the Mayor of Living Island.
- Freddy the Flute (voiced by Joan Gerber) — A magic talking flute owned by Jimmy. He is often targeted by Witchiepoo.
- Cling and Clang (performed by Joy Campbell and Angelo Rossitto) — Two short mute police officers who work for H.R. Pufnstuf as his Rescue Racer Crew. Cling wears red and Clang wears green. Although they appear vaguely animal-like with their beaked faces, and furry three-toed feet, the Kroffts have said they are actually bells, hence their names, but there are police officers in Pippi Longstocking named Cling and Clang as well.
- Wilhelmina W. Witchiepoo (portrayed by Billie Hayes) — The primary antagonist of the series, inspired by Margaret Hamilton's portrayal of the Wicked Witch of the West. Witchiepoo is a wicked but ineffective witch who has been targeting Freddy the Flute. She rides a large rocket-powered broom with a steering wheel called the Vroom Broom. She is cruel to everyone around her, even her henchmen, whom she constantly whacks with her wand. Yet when faced with failure, Witchiepoo usually starts to pity herself by asking "Why me?"
  - Orson Vulture (performed by Joy Campbell, voiced by Lennie Weinrib, imitating Frank Nelson) — A stuffy, somewhat inept vulture who is one of Witchiepoo's henchmen. As her favorite flunky, he multitasks as her sounding board operator, butler, and co-pilot on her Vroom Broom. Orson once made the mistake of asking what the W. in his boss's name stood for. The answer: WHACK!
  - Seymour Spider (performed by Angelo Rossitto, voiced by Walker Edmiston) — A dim-witted "spider" (appearance as a furry orange ogre with eight limbs) who is another of Witchiepoo's henchmen. As her second favorite flunky, he primarily serves her as her hairdresser and an alternative sounding board operator when Orson was busy.
  - Stupid Bat (performed by Sharon Baird, voiced by Lennie Weinrib) — A bat who is the least favorite and least seen of Witchiepoo's henchmen. He mainly serves as her messenger. As his name implies, Stupid Bat is not very bright and his messages are usually delivered one second too late.
  - Skeleton Guards — Two skeletons who guard Witchiepoo's castle. They are easily spooked and will often run from danger in a flash, but not before their armor and capes fly off in a cartoonish fashion.

=== Others ===
- Dr. Blinky (performed by Johnny Silver, voiced by Walker Edmiston impersonating Ed Wynn) — An owl who is Living Island's physician and scientist. Dr. Blinky is also the head of H.R. Pufnstuf's "Anti-Smog, Pollution, and Witch Committee". Other characters (including Polka-Dotted Horse) fear his medical incompetence and are terrified at the prospect of being treated by him.
- Judy Frog (performed by Sharon Baird, voiced by Joan Gerber) — A singing, dancing frog who is one of H.R. Pufnstuf's friends and the resident entertainer. Judy is based on Judy Garland, whom Sid Krofft had previously toured with and opened for.
- Pop Lolly (voiced by Lennie Weinrib) — A living lollipop who makes and sells candy and other sweet goods.
  - Cheese Guards — Two guards that are living pieces of cheese who work for Pop Lolly. They would often help Pop Lolly fend off a group of Hippie Ants who want to have free candy.
- Ludicrous Lion (performed by Johnny Silver, voiced by Walker Edmiston impersonating W. C. Fields) — A lion who works as a peddler and owns a horse-drawn wagon. He is quite cunning and not always so honest when it comes to money. Although slightly shady and greedy, he is officially one of the Good Guys since he would often help to thwart Witchiepoo's plots.
  - Polka-Dotted Horse (performed by Felix Silla, voiced by Lennie Weinrib) — A good-natured but dim-witted horse who works for Ludicrous Lion.
- Tick Tock (performed by Andy Ratoucheff, voiced by Lennie Weinrib) — An anthropomorphic alarm clock that warns the good characters when Witchiepoo is coming and informs them of various other dangers.
- Grandfather Clock (voiced by Walker Edmiston) — An anthropomorphic grandfather clock who is married to Grandmother Clock.
- Grandmother Clock (voiced by Joan Gerber) — An anthropomorphic grandmother clock who is married to Grandfather Clock.
- Miss Wristwatch (voiced by Joan Gerber impersonating Zsa Zsa Gabor) — A glamorous, rich anthropomorphic human-sized wristwatch.
- Hippie Ants — A group of ants that would try to have free candy from Pop Lolly.
- The Boyds — A bunch of birds that serve as Living Island's residential band. The Boyds are based on The Byrds.
  - Lady Boyd (performed by Sharon Baird, voiced by Joan Gerber) — A blue bird who is the lead singer of The Boyds. She was often seen singing the end theme to this show.
- Shirlee Pufnstuf (performed by Sharon Baird, voiced by Joan Gerber impersonating a younger Shirley Temple) — A dragon who is H.R. Pufnstuf's sister and a famous actress.
- Max von Toadenoff the Great (voiced by Lennie Weinrib) — A monocled toad who works as a film director. Max von Toadenoff the Great is based on Erich von Stroheim, but named for Akim Tamiroff.
- The Good Trees — Several walking, talking trees who always help out H.R. Pufnstuf and the good guys. In the film Pufnstuf, the song "Living Island" described them as the "Hippie Trees of Peace and Love". They consist of:
  - Hippie Tree (voiced by Lennie Weinrib) — A tree with sunglasses and dreadlocks who often speaks in hippie slang.
  - Madame Willow (voiced by Joan Gerber) — Also known as the Dowager Tree, Madame Willow is an older, elitist female tree with a lorgnette.
  - Chief Redwood (voiced by Walker Edmiston) — Also known as the Indian Tree, Chief Redwood dons a feathered headdress and speaks in the fashion of a stereotypical melodramatic Native American.
  - There is an older, male tree who may or may not be the husband of Madame Willow.
  - There is another female tree whose lips are always in the shape of an "O".
  - There is a baby tree.
- The Evil Trees — Three trees on Witchiepoo's side that speak in a Transylvanian accent.
  - Evil Tree #1 — (voiced by Lennie Weinrib impersonating Bela Lugosi) — The leader of the Evil Trees.
  - Evil Tree #2 (voiced by Walker Edminston impersonating Peter Lorre) —.
  - Evil Tree #3 (voiced by Lennie Weinrib) — A tree that always speaks in rhyme.
- The Mushrooms — A group of talking mushrooms on Witchiepoo's side that turn whoever touches them into mushrooms. The mushroom leader smokes a cigar and speaks like James Cagney.
- The Crustaceans — They are shown in several episodes as well as the closing theme song, some crab-like characters who are never named or introduced. There is a family of them, much like the living clocks and the living trees. They almost never say anything, but one of them has a couple of brief lines in "The Almost Election of Witchiepoo."
- Witchiepoo's Castle — A talking, living entity that is home to Witchiepoo and her minions. There is also a door inside the castle that is a separate living entity as well as living pillars.
- Dr. Blinky's House — A broken down house, propped up with crutches with a bandage on one side and an ice pack atop its chimney. It suffers from explosive sneezing that it has no control over. This usually sends Pufnstuf and friends running for cover, although it has been occasionally used to thwart Witchiepoo's plans enough for her to tell the house to cover its door when it sneezes. It houses several other characters such as fireplace (who speaks like Edward G. Robinson), a test tube (voiced by Walker Edmiston) and a candle (voiced by Walker Edmiston). There is a talking human skull (who speaks like Boris Karloff) and a few talking books, one of which is named Charlie (voiced by Lennie Weinrib). Charlie's brother, an evil black book of spells, is kept on Witchiepoo's nightstand.
- The Winds — The Winds of Living Island are often called upon by H.R. Pufnstuf to blow Witchiepoo out of the sky. They consist of the North Wind (voiced by Walker Edmiston in a shivering voice), the South Wind (voiced by Joan Gerber in a southern belle voice), the East Wind (voiced by Walker Edmiston in a Chinese accent), and the West Wind (voiced by Lennie Weinrib impersonating John Wayne).

== Production ==
After creating costumes for characters in the live-action portion of The Banana Splits Adventure Hour, Sid and Marty Krofft were asked to develop their own Saturday morning children's series for NBC. The plot was recycled from Kaleidoscope, a live puppet show the Kroffts had staged in the Coca-Cola pavilion of the HemisFair '68 World's Fair. It included several key characters from this show, such as Luther the dragon and a silly witch. Other ideas were cultivated from Sid's life. As a child, he had charged friends buttons, not pennies, to view puppet shows in his back yard; buttons were standard currency on Living Island. Sid and Marty had toured with their puppets as the opening act for Judy Garland, and they based Judy the Frog on her. The Ludicrous Lion bears have more than a passing resemblance to Irving, the eponymous lion in a pilot they had made in 1957 called Here's Irving.

Sid's friend Lionel Bart asked him to view a rough cut of the movie adaptation of Oliver! Sid took notice of young actor Jack Wild and immediately decided that he was the kid whom he wanted to play the lead in his television series. Only two actresses auditioned to play Witchiepoo. The first was then-unknown Penny Marshall. Stage veteran Billie Hayes came in next, set into a maniacal cackle and hopped up on a desk. She was given the part on the spot.

For Marty Krofft, the production was a particular headache. Marty accepted guardianship of Jack Wild while the teenage boy was in the United States filming the show. He later described bringing Wild into his home as a mistake, considering that he already had his hands full with two young daughters.

Like most children's television shows of the era, H.R. Pufnstuf contained a laugh track, the inclusion of which the Kroffts were initially against. Sid Krofft commented "We were sort of against that, but Si Rose — being in sitcoms — he felt that when the show was put together that the children would not know when to laugh." Marty Krofft added "the bottom line — it's sad — you gotta tell them when it's funny. And the laugh track, (Si) was right. It was necessary, as much as we were always looking to have a real laugh track, a real audience. In comedies, if you don't have them (laugh track), you're in big trouble, because if you don't hear a laugh track, it's not funny. And that's the way the audience (at home) was programmed to view these shows."

H.R. Pufnstuf appeared in a segment of Sigmund and the Sea Monsters, and along with Witchiepoo in the Lidsville episode "Have I Got a Girl For Hoo Doo", where Hoo Doo conjures Pufnstuf as Witchiepoo's date for a witches' dance. The Krofft Superstar Hour also involved characters in two segments The Lost Island (which H.R. Pufnstuf was in) and Horror Hotel (in which Witchiepoo, Orson Vulture, Seymour Spider, and Stupid Bat are featured with Hoodoo). The Kroffts also loaned out the character, with Hayes reprising her role, for The Paul Lynde Halloween Special, in which she appears as the sister of the Wicked Witch of the West (portrayed by Margaret Hamilton).

== Theme song ==
The show's theme song, titled "H.R. Pufnstuf", was written by Les Szarvas but is also credited to Paul Simon. Simon's credit was added when he successfully sued The Kroffts, claiming that the theme too closely mimicked his song "The 59th Street Bridge Song (Feelin' Groovy)". He is credited as the song's co-writer in TeeVee Tunes's Television's Greatest Hits Volume 5: In Living Color.

A cover of the show's theme song, performed by The Murmurs, is included on the 1995 tribute album Saturday Morning: Cartoons' Greatest Hits, produced by Ralph Sall for MCA Records.

== Episodes ==
No.	Title	Original release date
1	"The Magic Path"	September 6, 1969
Jimmy and H. R. Pufnstuf infiltrate Witchiepoo's castle to rescue Judy Frog so that they can get directions to the Magic Path. The Magic Path is the only way off Living Island. Will Jimmy and Freddy get back home?
2	"The Wheely Bird"	September 13, 1969
Jimmy and H. R. Pufnstuf use a bird-shaped "Trojan Horse" as a ruse to enter Witchipoo's castle and recover Freddy from Witchiepoo.
3	"Show Biz Witch"	September 20, 1969
When shyster Ludicrous Lion convinces Jimmy that he has a super-duper pogo stick for sale that could bounce him home, H. R. Pufnstuf and Jimmy conduct a talent show to raise the money.
4	"The Mechanical Boy"	September 27, 1969
After catching him trying to steal her boat, Witchiepoo puts a spell on Jimmy that turns him into a mechanical boy and commands him to acquire Freddy for her. The Clock People have to find a way to cure Jimmy.
5	"The Stand In"	October 4, 1969
When H. R. Pufnstuf's sister Shirley comes to Living Island to make a movie, Jimmy and Freddie get parts in it. Together, they hatch a plot to get Witchiepoo into the movie so that Jimmy can steal her Vroom Broom to escape.
6	"The Golden Key"	October 11, 1969
Jimmy buys a map to the location of the Golden Key which unlocks the Golden Door (a secret way off of Living Island), Witchiepoo captures H. R. Pufnstuf and imprisons him in her dungeon diverting Jimmy from his escape.
7	"The Birthday Party"	October 18, 1969
It's Jimmy's birthday and Pufnstuf and his friends fix a surprise birthday party for him. Witchiepoo invites herself to Jimmy's party and steals Freddy by rendering the partygoers helpless with laughing gas.
8	"The Box Kite Kaper"	October 25, 1969
Jimmy and Freddy attempt to fly from Living Island in a giant box kite during a kite-flying contest.
9	"You Can't Have Your Cake"	November 1, 1969
Witchiepoo hides in a cake to steal Freddy. Also, Judy Frog teaches the gang a pre-Michael Jackson Moonwalk dance.
10	"The Horse with the Golden Throat"	November 8, 1969
The Polka-Dotted Horse accidentally swallows Freddy causing a big catastrophe with Dr. Blinky, H. R. Pufnstuf, and Jimmy.
11	"Dinner for Two"	November 15, 1969
Jimmy and Freddy both age 70 years when the Clock Family's time machine malfunctions. Witchiepoo mistakes Jimmy for an old man and falls in love with him.
12	"Flute, Book and Candle"	November 22, 1969
Freddy gets turned into a mushroom by the touch of Witchiepoo's evil mushrooms. Jimmy disguises himself as a beggar (in the guise of Jack Wild's Artful Dodger character from the 1968 film Oliver!) to rescue Freddy from the spell.
13	"Tooth for a Tooth"	November 29, 1969
Disguised as a little girl, Witchiepoo visits Dr. Blinky about a bad tooth. But she breaks into fits of rage when the pain becomes too much forcing the doctor to calm her down via love potion.
14	"The Visiting Witch"	December 6, 1969
Witchiepoo receives a message from headquarters that the Boss Witch is coming to Living Island for an inspection. In a plot to impress the Boss Witch, she ends up kidnapping H. R. Pufnstuf.
15	"The Almost Election of Witchiepoo"	December 13, 1969
Witchiepoo runs for Mayor of Living Island challenging H. R. Pufnstuf with another of her spells.
16	"Whaddya Mean the Horse Gets the Girl?"	December 21, 1969
H. R. Pufnstuf's sister Shirley stars in a movie to raise money for Living Island's anti-witch fund.
17	"'Jimmy Who?"	December 27, 1969
Jimmy gets amnesia that Dr. Blinky and Witchiepoo take turns trying to cure with flashbacks from earlier episodes.

All episodes were directed by Hollingsworth Morse and written by Lennie Weinrib and Paul Harrison. (Robert Ridolphi also co-wrote Episode 1 "The Magic Path".)

== Cast ==
- Jack Wild – Jimmy
- Billie Hayes – Wilhelmina W. Witchiepoo

=== Krofft puppets ===
Performer	Character(s)	Voice(s)
Sharon Baird	Stupid Bat	Lennie Weinrib
Sharon Baird	Judy Frog	Joan Gerber
Sharon Baird	Shirley Pufnstuf	Joan Gerber
Sharon Baird	Lady Boyd	End credits vocals
Joy Campbell	Orson Vulture	Lennie Weinrib
Joy Campbell	Cling	No voice
Robert Gamonet	H.R. Pufnstuf	Lennie Weinrib
Angelo Rossitto	Seymour Spider	Walker Edmiston
Angelo Rossitto	Clang	No voice
Johnny Silver	Dr. Blinky	Walker Edmiston
Johnny Silver	Ludicrous Lion	Walker Edmiston
Jerry Landon	?	?
Jon Linton	?	?
Scutter McKay	?	?
Harry Monty	?	?
Andy Ratoucheff	Tick Tock	Lennie Weinrib
Robin Roper	?	?
Felix Silla	Polka-Dotted Horse	Lennie Weinrib

=== Voice characterizations ===
- Lennie Weinrib – H.R. Pufnstuf, Bela Lugosi Tree, Dr. Blinky's Talking Book, Stupid Bat, Pop Lolly, West Wind, Akim Toadenoff the Great, Orson Vulture, Polka Dotted Horse, Hippie Tree, Alarm Clock, Jimmy as Movie Villain
- Walker Edmiston – Dr. Blinky, Peter Lorre Tree, Dr. Blinky's Candle, East Wind, Grandfather Clock, North Wind, Chief Redwood, Dr. Blinky's Test Tube, Ludicrous Lion, Seymour Spider
- Joan Gerber – Freddy the Flute, Grandmother Clock, Judy the Frog, Madame Willow, South Wind, Lady Boyd, Shirley Pufnstuf

== Film ==
While the television series was still in production, the Kroffts were approached to do a film adaptation. A joint venture between Universal Pictures and the show's sponsor Kellogg's Cereal, the 1970 film retained most of the cast and crew from the series and featured guest appearances by Cass Elliot as Witch Hazel and Martha Raye as Boss Witch. The movie was finally released on VHS in 2001 by Universal Home Video as part of its Universal Treasures Collection and on DVD on May 19, 2009. The film also included Googy Gopher, Orville Pelican, and Boss Witch's chauffeur Heinrich Rat, who were exclusive to the movie. A difference in the film is that the characters that had been voiced by Lennie Weinrib were each voiced by Allan Melvin and Don Messick.

The Kroffts have long had plans for a new H.R. Pufnstuf film. Sony first attempted a remake in 2000, but dropped the project. Eight years later, Sony again announced development on the project.

== Tours ==
A number of stage show tours were run in the United States starring the characters from the show. "H.R. Pufnstuf & The Brady Kids Live at the Hollywood Bowl" was performed and recorded in 1973. This performance was released on VHS in 1997.

In 1970, H.R. Pufnstuf was featured in a float at the Rose Parade in Pasadena, featuring the cast from the show.

An elaborate H.R. Pufnstuf puppet show was featured at The Sid and Marty Krofft Puppet Theater at Six Flags Over Mid-Missouri in 1971. H.R. Pufnstuf and his pals Cling and Clang also made life-size appearances at the park. A section of the 1971 Six Flags Over Mid-Missouri map shows the location of the theater near the entrance to the park's Sky-Way Ride.

== Home media releases ==
In 2004, Rhino Entertainment/Rhino Retrovision released H.R. Pufnstuf: The Complete Series, featuring all 17 episodes on three discs, remastered and uncut, accompanied by interviews with Sid & Marty Krofft, Billie Hayes, and Jack Wild. Pufnstuf, a major motion picture released in 1970, was also released on May 19, 2009, by Universal Studios. SMK and Vivendi Entertainment has obtained the home video rights to the series and released the complete series on January 11, 2011. Two versions of the release exist; one is a traditional complete series set, while the other is a collector's set, featuring a bobble-head of H.R. Pufnstuf. The series is also available in Digital media format at iTunes Store.

In the United Kingdom, during 1986, Channel 5 Video released the opening three episodes of the television series on VHS.

== McDonaldland lawsuit ==
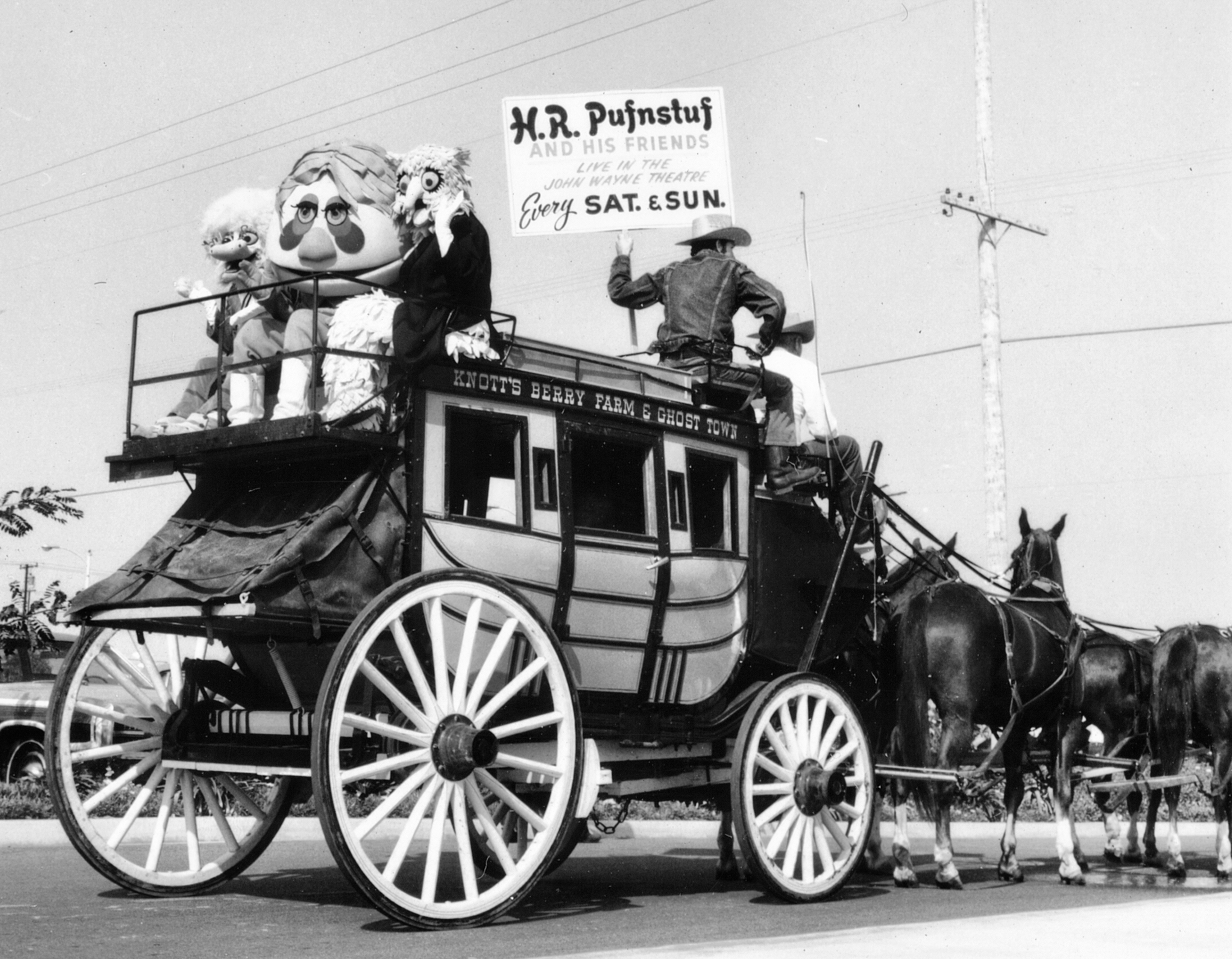
H.R. Pufnstuf at Knott's Berry Farm, 1970s

The show was the subject of a successful U.S. federal lawsuit brought by the Kroffts against the fast food restaurant McDonald's, whose McDonaldland characters were found to have infringed the show's copyright. The case, Sid & Marty Krofft Television Productions Inc. v. McDonald's Corp., 562 F.2d 1157, was decided by the U.S. Court of Appeals for the Ninth Circuit in 1977.

== Claims of drug references ==
The Krofft brothers have responded in several interviews to popular beliefs that subtle recreational drug references exist in the show. For example, the title character's name Pufnstuf has been interpreted as a reference to smoking hand-rolled (H.R.) marijuana (puffin' stuff); Marty Krofft has said the initials H.R. actually stand for "Royal Highness" backwards. The show's theme song lyric "he can't do a little, 'cause he can't do enough" has been read as referring to the addictive nature of drugs. Pufnstuf has quotes like "Whoa, dude!" and other "hippie" slang words. Lennie Weinrib, the show's head writer and the voice of Pufnstuf, has said, "I think fans gave it a kind of mysterious code-like meaning, like 'Ah, was Pufnstuf puffing stuff? Like grass?' Was it psychedelic? Was it drug oriented? Not to us, it wasn't." In a 2000 interview, Marty Krofft answered the question by saying, "The Krofft look has a lot of color, but there were no drug connotations in the show." He addressed the topic at length in an interview with the St. Louis Post-Dispatch in 2004, in response to the question, "OK, let's get this right out in the open. Is H.R. Pufnstuf just one giant drug reference?":

We've heard that for 35 years. We did not intentionally do anything related to drugs in the story. People thought we were on drugs. You can't do good television while on drugs. People never believe you when you say that, but you can't. The shows were very bright and spacey looking. They may have lent themselves to that culture at the time, but we didn't ascribe that meaning to them, and I can't speak to what adults were doing when they were watching the shows. We just set out to make a quality children's program.

— Marty Krofft

Authors of books on the show and its contemporaries, however, have not always accepted the Kroffts' alternative explanations for apparent references to drugs. David Martindale, author of Pufnstuf & Other Stuff, maintains that the Kroffts' desire to attract an audience who are now parents of impressionable children pushes them to downplay the double entendres: "But to deny it, the shows lose some of their mystique. The Kroffts prefer to remain playfully vague." Martindale said in another interview that he fully believes Marty Krofft's insistence that he did not use drugs, especially given that Marty's focus was that of a businessman, but Martindale describes Sid Krofft as "a big kid" and "a hippy", saying, "His comment when I told him we were going to do this book was—and I quote—'Oh, far out.' He says these shows didn't come from smoking just a little pot, and you could say, 'Oh, yeah. It comes from smoking a lot of pot.' But I think he was very deliberately doing double meanings so the show could amuse people on different levels."

Kevin Burke, co-author of Saturday Morning Fever: Growing Up with Cartoon Culture, argues that the "consistency of thought" in the rumors of drug references has a basis, although his co-author and brother Timothy Burke, a history professor at Swarthmore College, insists "human beings are capable of achieving hallucinatory heights without chemical assistance." Contradicting his own position, Marty Krofft has neither admitted nor hinted in occasional interviews that the references were made knowingly; in one case, a writer reported that when pressed as to the connotation of "lids" in the title Lidsville, "Well, maybe we just had a good sense of humor", Krofft said, laughing. His comments to another interviewer were more direct; in a Times Union profile whose author observed, "Watching the shows today, it's hard to imagine a show with more wink-and-nod allusions to pot culture, short of something featuring characters named Spliffy and Bong-O", Krofft conceded that the show's title had been an intentional marijuana reference, as had Lidsville, but "that was just a prank to see if they could get them past clueless NBC executives".

== Comic book ==
Gold Key Comics published a H.R. Pufnstuf comic book series which ran for eight issues from October 1970 to July 1972.

== Parodies and tributes ==
- H.R. Pufnstuf appears in the eighth episode of the first-season of CHiPs, titled "Green Thumb Burglars", with his voice reprised by Lennie Weinrib. He is pulled over by Ponch (Erik Estrada) and Jon (Larry Wilcox) on one of Los Angeles' numerous freeways. Though he was referred to by name, while Jon maintained a sense of decorum about the actor inside the Pufnstuf suit, he let the good Mayor Pufnstuf off with a warning. Ponch later declared himself a "big overgrown kid", in reference to the kids' show.
- A parody of H.R. Pufnstuf was "The Altered State of Druggachusetts", a segment on the HBO comedy series Mr. Show with Bob and David. The sketch consists of a failed television pilot for a kids' show introduced by "Sam and Criminy Craffft" (portrayed by Bob Odenkirk and David Cross). The show itself is similar to H.R. Pufnstuf, with drug references made humorously overt. Instead of a talking flute, the boy carries a talking bong, and all of the residents in Druggachusetts take or are living incarnations of various drugs.
- Nike made a skateboarding shoe for their SB Dunk line named after the show, with the colors of the shoe resembling those of Pufnstuf.
- Todd Kauffman, animator and director of the Total Drama series, initially made a pitch for an animated adaptation of H.R. Pufnstuf in 2005 complete with an animated opening sequence with the theme song covered and performed by Finger Eleven, but option rights costs led the project to be disbanded.
- Universal Orlando’s annual Halloween Horror Nights event featured the character of ‘H.R. Bloodengutz’, a fictional TV show host whose name parodies Pufnstuf’s at it’s 2011, 2021, and 2026 events.
- In 2016, H.R. Pufnstuf, Cling, Clang, and Freddy the Flute appear in a crossover episode of Mutt & Stuff titled "H.R. Pufnstuf Comes to Mutt & Stuff!" with H.R. Pufnstuf voiced by Randy Credico with Mary Karcz providing the in-suit performance and Donna Kimball providing the face performance, Freddy the Flute performed by Kimball, and Cling and Clang performed by Arturo Gil and Joseph S. Griffo. H.R. Pufnstuf is depicted as the uncle of Stuff.
- In 2017, professor of religion Jeffrey Kripal wrote in his book Secret Body of the show's impact on his young life. "Disturbing," he recalled. "Who wrote this stuff? And puff'n on what stuff?"
