= Sesame Street episode 847 =

Episode 847
- Sesame Street episode
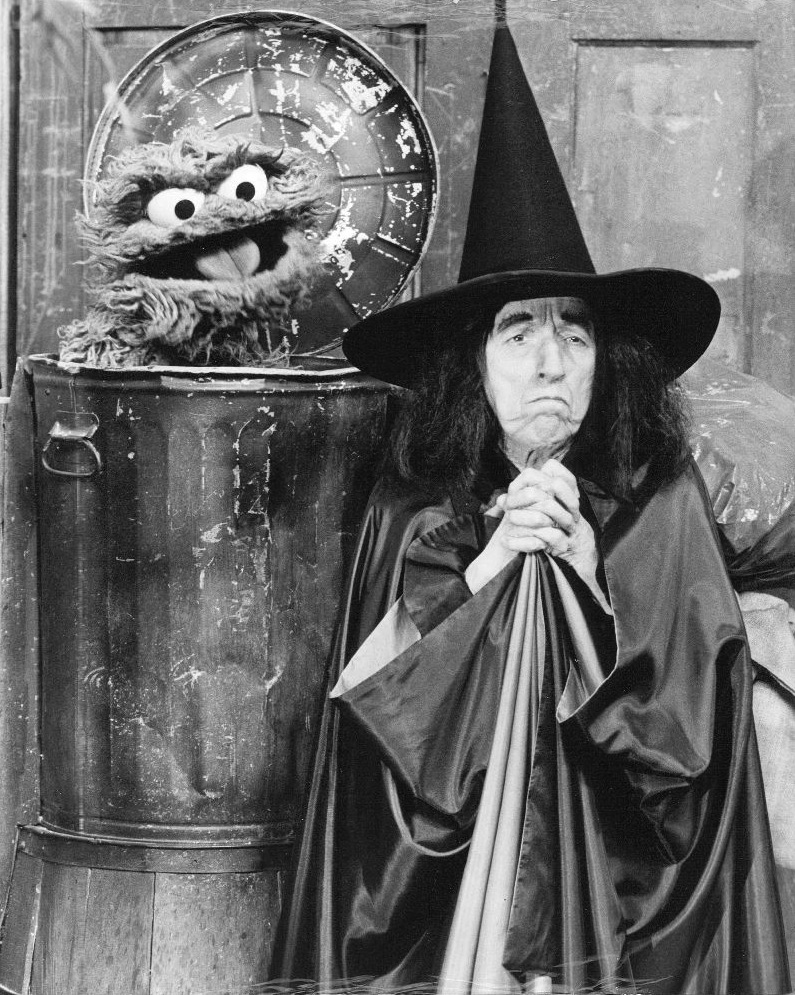
- The Wicked Witch next to Oscar the Grouch; until the online leak, it was among the few remaining images of the episode.
- Episode no.: Season 7 Episode 52
- Directed by: Robert Myhrum
- Written by: Joseph A. Bailey; Judy Freudberg; Emily Kingsley
- Original air date: February 10, 1976
- Running time: 59 minutes

Guest appearance
- Margaret Hamilton as the Wicked Witch of the West

Episode chronology
← Previous "Episode 846"	Next → "Episode 848"

Episode 847 (commonly known as the "Wicked Witch episode") is the 52nd episode from the seventh season of the American educational children's television series Sesame Street. Directed by Robert Myhrum and written by Joseph A. Bailey, Judy Freudberg and Emily Kingsley, it originally aired on PBS on February 10, 1976. The episode involves the Wicked Witch of the West, from the film The Wizard of Oz (1939), losing her broomstick over Sesame Street and causing havoc as she attempts to recover it. Margaret Hamilton, who portrayed the witch in the film, reprises her role in the episode. The episode was created to teach children how to overcome their fears.

Shortly after its premiere, the creators of the series and Children's Television Workshop received various letters from angry parents, who said that the Wicked Witch had frightened their children. Due to this, the episode was pulled from rebroadcast and was not seen by the public again until 2019, when clips of the episode were shown during a "Lost and Found" event celebrating Sesame Street's 50th anniversary and the full episode was archived in the Library of Congress. It was then only available for private viewing until June 2022, when it was leaked online by an unknown individual.

== Plot ==
As David walks out of Hooper's Store and notes the windy weather rolling into Sesame Street, he catches a broom that falls from the sky, causing the wind to stop. Afterwards, the Wicked Witch of the West emerges from around the corner and finds she is not in Oz anymore. Upon spotting David with her broom, she demands to have it back, only for David to refuse to return the broom until she shows him some respect. The Wicked Witch, who cannot touch the broom while another person is holding it, disappears angrily in a puff of smoke.

David re-enters the store and shows the broom to Maria before the Wicked Witch reappears and causes it to rain inside the store. Everyone exits the store and they run into Big Bird. The witch returns again and attempts to get the broom from Big Bird, who is brave and defends his friends. She then threatens to transform David into a basketball and Big Bird into a feather duster before disappearing in another puff of smoke.

Oscar the Grouch develops a crush on the Wicked Witch, who disguises herself as an elderly human woman and returns to Hooper's Store. She again attempts to retrieve the broom, but David sees through the disguise and says he will only set the broom down if she asks for it nicely. She does, with extreme difficulty, and as she picks up the broom she transforms back into a witch. The group are then seen watching as the witch flies away. While on her way back to Oz she shows off flying the broom with no hands, resulting in it falling back down to Sesame Street. Down on the street, David catches the broom again and begins crying, saying he can't go through this again. The Wicked Witch is then heard announcing the sponsors and cackling offscreen.

== Cast ==
=== Human Cast ===
- Margaret Hamilton as Wicked Witch of the West
- Northern Calloway as David
- Sonia Manzano as Maria

=== Muppet Performance ===
- Caroll Spinney as Big Bird and Oscar the Grouch
- Jim Henson as Ernie and Guy Smiley
- Frank Oz as Bert, Grover, and Cookie Monster
- Jerry Nelson as Herry Monster and Mr. Johnson
- Richard Hunt as Gladys the Cow
- Matt Robinson as Roosevelt Franklin

== History ==
=== Background ===
Margaret Hamilton reprised her role as the Wicked Witch in several television appearances in the 1970s. She made guest appearances as the witch and herself on Mister Rogers' Neighborhood three times in 1975 and 1976, prior to the airing of the Sesame Street episode. In those episodes, her character interacted with the residents of the Neighborhood of Make-Believe, though she was not wearing the complete green make-up that she would wear in the Sesame Street episode. Fred Rogers had wanted to dispel children's fears and explain that the witch was an imaginary character. Out of costume, Hamilton explained the psychology of her character and why children need not be afraid of a television witch. Later in 1976, Hamilton appeared as the Wicked Witch in The Paul Lynde Halloween Special.

During the Sesame Street episode, David offers the Wicked Witch a cup of coffee. She refuses, saying that she "can't stand the stuff"; at the time, Hamilton had been appearing in commercials for Maxwell House coffee as a storeowner named Cora who only sold that brand of coffee in her shop.

Planning and research for the Children's Television Workshop included the development of "affective" goals for Sesame Street's curriculum. Aside from the plot of the Wicked Witch episode, planners generally preferred to have actors display stereotyped emotions rather than using skits that might evoke children's emotional responses, with the concern that children might be frightened or saddened when caretakers are not immediately available.

=== Release and controversy ===
Episode 847 aired in the United States on February 10, 1976, at 4:30 PM as the 52nd episode of Sesame Street's seventh season. The episode sparked an immediate backlash against series creators Joan Ganz and Lloyd Morrisett and the Children's Television Workshop (now Sesame Workshop) with an unusually large number of letters from angry parents. Many said in the letters that their children were afraid of the depiction of the Wicked Witch, using phrases such as "screams and tears", and refused to watch any more episodes.

Due to the large number of letters being received, the CTW held test screenings for the episode in March 1976; during the test screenings, children were noted to be attentive to the scenes featuring the Wicked Witch; however, they were unable to determine if it was triggering actual fear. Out of fears of further controversy, it was decided that the episode would not be re-aired as part of syndication.

In 2019, the episode resurfaced as part of a "Lost and Found" event at the Museum of the Moving Image in Queens, New York, to celebrate the Sesame Street franchise's 50th anniversary. It was also reported that the episode had been archived in the Library of Congress, although it was unknown if the episode was available for private viewing at the time. It was later confirmed by the American Archive of Public Broadcasting (AAPB) that the episode would be available for private viewing.

== Legacy ==
Conceptual artist Alex Da Corte reimagined the episode's meeting between the Wicked Witch and Oscar the Grouch at the 58th Venice Biennale in 2019, dressing as the witch in his video Rubber Pencil Devil.

=== Online leak ===
On June 18, 2022, the episode was leaked onto Reddit by an anonymous user known as sarsaparilla170170; the uploader did not clarify how the episode was obtained. Several news sites began reporting on it a few days later. A few viewers of the original broadcast recalled their experience upon its leaking, with one writing "I was so scared of the Wizard of Oz when I was a kid! Then to see this on Sesame Street as a child it was crazy!"

The AAPB stated that they "regret that the actions of a few irresponsible Sesame Street fans mean that other fans are now deprived of legal access to this cultural treasure", temporarily banning private viewings and attempting to remove uploads of the episode.

== See also ==
- Lost television broadcast
- "Snuffy's Parents Get a Divorce" - another episode of Sesame Street that went unreleased due to similar unintended effects on children
