= Miss Gulch Returns! =

One-man musical comedy

Miss Gulch Returns! is a one-man musical comedy written and originally performed in 1979 by Fred Barton. It is a loose parody of the character Almira Gulch from the 1939 MGM film The Wizard of Oz as portrayed by Margaret Hamilton. Although the script alludes to the character of the Wicked Witch of the West (also portrayed by Hamilton in the film) it focuses primarily on Gulch. Blurring the line between fiction and reality, the show builds on the premise that Almira Gulch was an actress—rather than a character portrayed by an actress—who appeared in The Wizard of Oz (as herself), and who has existence beyond that film, most notably as a second-tier nightclub performer.

== History and original production ==
The show got its start as a five minute turn at an after-show cabaret in 1979. Barton had been hired as the musical director for a local production of The Wizard of Oz, but when the actress hired to play Gulch/The Witch quit, Barton was asked to take over the role. At late night cabarets following the show, Barton would perform the song "I'm a Bitch", becoming an annual tradition as he returned to the part each summer. Shortly following Margaret Hamilton's death, Barton got to work working on a complete tribute to her character, eventually culminating as Miss Gulch Lives!, opening at Palsson's Supper Club in November 1983. More edits followed, and sporting a new title, this new version of the show, Miss Gulch Returns, premiered in 1984 off-off-Broadway at the Duplex Theatre in New York. A cast recording of the show was released in 1986, recorded in front of a live audience at Uptown Chelsea Sound. The original production won Barton a Back Stage Bistro Award in Musical Comedy Performance.

== Plot ==
Barton initially appears as himself, and after some brief patter, he takes on the personality of a neurotic single man who encounters Almira Gulch drinking in a cabaret bar, and tries to pick her up (being a one-man show, this "encounter" happens through a conversation of which the audience hears one side.) He is so fascinated by Gulch that he adopts her personality for the evening ("You're The Woman I'd Wanna Be"). The number does a slow build until, in a fit of exasperation, Barton turns into "Miss Gulch" before the audience's eyes with a deft "magical" costume change.

As described in the cast recording's liner notes, Almira is an "embittered also-ran." She resents the success and happiness that she perceives in others, most notably Wizard of Oz "costar" Judy Garland, and the show satirizes the cult status of Garland within the gay community. Almira complains that her big musical number ("I'm A Bitch") was cut from the final version of The Wizard of Oz, while Garland achieved immortality by performing "Somewhere Over the Rainbow".

She describes the evolution of her acid personality by singing of a lonely childhood in Topeka, Kansas ("Born On A Bike"), a parody of Garland's "Born In A Trunk" song from A Star Is Born. This devolves into the song the show is best-known for - "Pour Me a Man," where Almira reveals her extensive knowledge of liquor and booze, and her desire for a lover. In "Everyone Worth Taking" this ineptitude at finding a man is explored, as she looks into her romantic past, and how she is, in the words of Barton himself, "designed to survive all assaults from the optimist opposition." This heightens in "Don't Touch Me," where Miss Gulch speaks on the women who are lucky enough to have men but don't want them, and how she presumes they act. In a complete 180 to their attitude, when Miss Gulch unexpectedly meets a man herself, she makes her point known: "I'm Your Bitch". "Pour Me a Man (Part 2)" allows Almira to explore a world with both men and booze, instead of just the latter, but eventually bids her man goodbye in "Give My Best To The Blonde." Sharing the moral of the story with the audience in "Everyone Worth Taking (Part 2)/Finale," Miss Gulch bids us adieu and takes her leave.

== Songs ==
- "Take Me, Please"*
- "You're The Woman I'd Wanna Be"
- "I'm A Bitch"
- "Born On A Bike"
- "Pour Me A Man"
- "Everyone Worth Taking"
- "It's Not My Idea Of A Gig"
- "Don't Touch Me"
- "I'm Your Bitch"
- "Pour Me A Man (Part 2)"
- "Give My Best To The Blonde"
- "Everyone Worth Taking (Part 2)/Finale"

* Not included on the original release of the cast recording because of time restraints. Included as part of the CD remastered rerelease, taken from a November 1999 concert in Westrax, New York City.

== Other productions ==
Barton performed a 20th Anniversary version of the show in 2004, adding a song "I Can Be An Icon Too," nominated for a Manhattan Association of Cabarets original song award. In 2019, Barton revived the show at Austin Cabaret Theatre, in Austin, Texas.
