= Betty Danko =

American stuntwoman and stunt double

- Born: Bertha Danko; September 19, 1903; Newark, New Jersey, US
- Died: February 3, 1979 (aged 75); Santa Ana, California, US
- Occupations: Stuntwoman, stunt double
- Years active: 1927—late 1950s

Bertha "Betty" Danko (September 19, 1903 – February 3, 1979) was an American stuntwoman and stunt double. She doubled for many leading actresses of the 1930s and 1940s, but is best known for having doubled for Margaret Hamilton as the Wicked Witch of the West in the 1939 film The Wizard of Oz. During the filming of the skywriting scene, a pipe attached to the Witch's broomstick exploded, landing Danko in the hospital with a serious leg wound. Her career was cut short by a non-stunt accident in the late 1950s when she was struck by a car while waiting for a bus. She resided in a Hollywood bungalow for 50 years with her widowed mother.

== Early life ==
She was born Bertha Danko in Newark, New Jersey, on September 19, 1903. Her father, Johannes "John" Danko, was from Germany. Her mother, Mary Danko (née Drahos) was from Hungary. She had an older brother and sister. Danko was very athletic. In school she played right forward and competed in high jump, winning several medals.

== Career ==
Danko moved to Hollywood with her family in 1927. The Dankos had relatives living in Los Angeles and her father was convinced by their description of the city to sell their home and other real estate he owned in Elizabeth and move across the country. Danko intended to stay in California for a year earning money to pay for tuition at a chiropractic school back in New Jersey.

In her first week in Los Angeles, she was approached in a store by a woman who asked her to accompany her to an outdoor film shoot that evening. At the shoot, one of the actors came over to the two and asked if they worked in film. The woman replied that they did. The man told Danko she would make "a good college type" for their next film and asked for her phone number. A few weeks later, Danko received a call to report for work on a film playing a member of a girls' basketball team. Someone on that film suggested she apply for more work at Hal Roach Studios, and her career as a stunt double began.

Among the actresses she doubled for were Jean Arthur, Binnie Barnes, Joan Crawford, Irene Dunne, Madge Evans, Jean Harlow, Patsy Kelly, Elissa Landi, Myrna Loy, Maureen O'Sullivan, Marie Prevost, Thelma Todd, Marie Windsor, and Blanche Yurka. Danko referred to her stunts as "bump work", and received the standard studio fee of $11 per day as a stand-in, and $35 per day as a stunt double. In 1938, she was one of 25 stunt performers selected as "good risks" by Lloyd's of London, allowing her to purchase annual coverage against accidental death and dismemberment—a policy which also lowered insurance expenditures for the studios.

Her best-known job was doubling for Margaret Hamilton as the Wicked Witch of the West in the 1939 film The Wizard of Oz. For the Wicked Witch's fiery entrance into Munchkinland, a catapult had been rigged up under the sound stage and the opening through which the Witch would spring out was covered by a thin aluminum cover, painted the same color as the yellow brick road. While Danko waited in the pit, the choreographer was instructing the actors playing the Munchkins how to avoid the circular piece of metal, and fell through the opening onto Danko's shoulders. She was treated by a chiropractor at the studio's expense.

Danko sustained a more serious injury while enacting the Witch's skywriting scene, where she flies on her broomstick spelling out "Surrender, Dorothy!". Hamilton had refused to do the scene after suffering serious burns from descending into the opening in the stage floor amid fire and smoke. The production crew rigged up a broomstick suspended from wires, with a steel saddle for Danko to sit on. Underneath the saddle lay a pipe that emitted smoke when she pushed a button.

At first, Danko's cape was pinned down to hide the pipe, but the director wanted the cape to blow in the wind, so the pipe was concealed under Danko's body. Danko noticed that the crew coated the pipe with asbestos. On the first two takes, the pipe emitted smoke perfectly, but on the third take, the pipe exploded. Danko was blown off the broomstick and sustained a 2 in (51 mm)-deep gash around the circumference of her leg, landing her in the hospital for eleven days. According to Scarfone and Stillman, damage to her internal organs from the explosion required a hysterectomy. Her total earnings from her work on the film came to $790 (approximately $18,175.63 in 2025 adjusted for inflation) plus an extra $35 bonus ($805.25 in 2025) for the broomstick stunt.

In interviews, Danko said she plied her career as a Hollywood stuntwoman in order to support herself and her mother. She described falls as her specialty, saying:

I have fallen into ditches, lakes, pools, through trap doors, from piano tops, over chairs and tables, down laundry chutes and stairs. I have fallen over backwards from a height of 25 ft (7.6 m) into 32 in (810 mm) of water and into a pool fully clothed though I can barely swim. I've been yanked around on wires, had pies and knives thrown at me, have lain amid flames of gasoline—all for the sake of Art and a pay check. But I still like it and it enables me to support my mother and myself.

Like other stuntwomen, Danko risked life and limb in her work. Her most serious injury came from a mountain lion off-screen while she was doubling for Patsy Kelly in a Hal Roach comedy. While she was getting used to being around the animal, it suddenly swiped at her brightly-colored moccasin. Later she visited the trainer with the animal on the set and he encouraged her to show the animal her foot again, and move a little closer. The lion grabbed her leg and chomped down on it thirteen times. Danko received thirteen stitches and permanent scarring.

Danko's career was permanently cut short by an accident outside of her stunt work, when she was struck by a car that jumped the curb while she stood at a bus stop.

== Later life ==
Danko and her widowed mother lived in a bungalow, at 6526 La Mirada Drive in Hollywood for half a century. Danko died on February 3, 1979.

== Partial filmography ==
- Love Birds (1934)
- 3 on a Honeymoon (1934)
- 45 Fathers (1937)
- The Perfect Specimen (1937)
- The Wizard of Oz (1939)
- Street of Memories (1940)
- Broadway Limited (1941)
- Murder, He Says (1945)
- The Spanish Main (1945)
- Hazard (1948)
- Frenchie (1950)
- Soldiers Three (1951)
- The Searchers (1956)

== Sources ==
- Fleming, E. J. (2015). Hollywood Death and Scandal Sites: Seventeen Driving Tours with Directions and the Full Story (2nd ed.). McFarland. ISBN 9780786496440.
- Freese, Gene Scott (2014). Hollywood Stunt Performers, 1910s-1970s: A Biographical Dictionary (2nd ed.). McFarland. ISBN 9780786476435.
- Harmatz, Aljean (2013). The Making of the Wizard of Oz. Chicago Review Press. ISBN 9781613748350.
- Scarfone, Jay; Stillman, William (2018). The Road to Oz: The Evolution, Creation, and Legacy of a Motion Picture Masterpiece. Rowman & Littlefield. ISBN 9781493035328.
- Tibbetts, John C.; Walsh, James M. (2010). American Classic Screen Interviews. Scarecrow Press. ISBN 9780810876750.
