= Dorothy Hamilton Brush =

American birth control activist (1894–1968)

- Born: March 14, 1894; Cleveland, Ohio, U.S.
- Died: June 4, 1968 (aged 74); Bridgehampton, New York, U.S.
- Occupations: Activist; writer; playwright; author
- Years active: 1917–1968
- Relatives: Neil Hamilton (distant cousin); Margaret Hamilton (sister)

Dorothy Hamilton Brush (March 14, 1894 – June 4, 1968) was a birth control advocate, women's rights advocate and author. She worked with Margaret Sanger and the birth control movement and wrote plays, travel articles, and books (the latter with Walter S. Hayward.)

== Early life and education ==
Dorothy Hamilton Brush was born to Walter James Hamilton and Mary Jane Adams on March 14, 1894. She had two sisters, Gladys and Margaret, the latter of whom went on to become an actress most famous for portraying the Wicked Witch of the West in The Wizard of Oz, and grew up in Cleveland, Ohio, where Brush would attend Hathaway Brown School.

Brush graduated form Smith College in 1917 where she served as a delegate in New York to the Young Women's Christian Association (YWCA) Silver Bay Camp. She also acted as a house president, a student advisor, and participated in clubs and societies, such as the Alpha Society, Il Tricolore, Blue Pencil, and the Debating Union. As she was on an editing staff, Brush would work on various college publications such as the Monthly Board, the Weekly Board, and the Class Book Board, and would also write short stories. During her junior year of college, Brush acted as class historians and wrote the "History of Junior Year" in the 1917 yearbook, as well as the words for the Ivy Song and for "Alma Mater."

== Career ==
From 1917 to 1919, Dorothy worked for various charities in Washington, D.C., and then in Sheffield, Alabama, as he first husband, Charles, served in the Ordinance Officers' Reserve Corp of the Army as a first lieutenant, after which the couple would travel around the world, even stopping in Honolulu, Hawaii, before returning to the United States and settling in Cleveland, Ohio, where Charles established the Brush Research Laboratory.

After volunteering in Cleveland in 1922 for the Junior League, Brush's experience from working in a prenatal clinic led to her advocacy of women's health and birth control. In 1928, following the death of her first husband, Charles, Brush, along with friends and supporters, assisted in establishing the Maternal Health Association, a project which they had been mapping out since 1921, and which became a predecessor for Planned Parenthood of Cleveland, which was established in 1966. In 1929, Brush's father-in-law, inventor Charles F. Brush, Sr., appointed Dorothy to the board of managers of his newly created Brush Foundation, which he had named in memory of Dorothy's late husband, who had died the year prior.

Although Brush continued her work at the Maternal Health Association, she became more involved with the Brush Foundation, where she would serve as an administrator, and later as a chairwoman, from 1957 to 1963. Today, the Brush Foundation is still active and had widened its mission further the research and education on various birth control issues.

Although Brush's work with Margaret Sanger became her primary focus, she would continue to write using her maiden name, Dorothy Adams Hamilton. Brush would co-write with Walter S. Hayward on the works of The American People: A Popular History of the United States, 1865-1941 (1943) and Your Land and My Land: The American People from Lincoln to Roosevelt (1943). Brush would also write children's plays for the Samuel French Company, which were published in the later 1920's, as well as travel articles for the World Traveller magazine. On top of her published works, Brush also wrote manuscripts on women of Japan, Margaret Sanger, as well as birth control and menopause, though they were not published.

=== Work with Margaret Sanger ===
After moving to New York in 1929, Dorothy Hamilton Brush would meet Margaret Sanger by volunteering at her clinic, and would eventually travel across Asia and Europe with her as a missionary for birth control and family planning. As a Smith College alumni, Brush was aware of the Sophia Smith Collection (SSC) and its efforts in collecting women's history, and how it viewed Sanger's work with great value. Brush reached out to Margaret Storrs Grierson, director of the SSC, with whom she would convince Sanger to donate the portions of her papers that hadn't already been given to the Library of Congress, to the SSC. Brush was also influential in Margaret Sanger receiving an Honorary Doctor of Laws degree from Smith College in 1949 and led the effort to nominate her for a Nobel Prize.

In 1952, Sanger and Brush saw the result of their life's work in the international birth control movement with the establishment of the International Planned Parenthood Federation (IPPF). Receiving funding from the Brush Foundation, Brush would also start the IPPF newsletter, Around the World News of Population and Birth Control, and would serve as its editor until 1956. Although Brush had intended on retiring due to health problems, she would begin to serve as an Honorary Advisor for Field Work Services in 1957, where she and her fellow field officers would help support field office's efforts by locating funding, recruiting volunteers, and providing reliable information. Brush would work as an Honorary Advisor for 4 years before retiring in 1961.

As a result of Sanger's declining health, the pair had spent an increased amount of time in Sanger's home in Arizona where their relationship would become strained due to "petty disagreements" and Margaret's personality changes, which were a result of her health. Brush often felt as though she had to barricade her emotions and saw herself as "subservient" to Sanger and her medical needs. Brush suffered herself during these years and many years before from emphysema and other maladies, and her travel and activities were often restricted. In spite of their declining relationship, Brush remained by Sanger's side until her death, and stated that she felt "blessed" to have been in Margaret's life.

== Personal life ==
Dorothy Brush married her first husband, Charles Francis Brush Jr. in 1917. Charles was the son of Charles Brush Sr., inventor of the new arc lamp and lighting system. Brush Sr. would also found Brush Electric, which later became known as General Electric. Dorothy and Charles Jr. would have their first child, Jane, in 1920, and their second child, Charles III in 1923. In May 1927, Brush's daughter, Jane, fell ill with pneumonia, and required a blood transfusion, which her father, Charles Jr., had volunteered to give. Jane did not recover from her illness and died a week before her father, Charles Jr., who suffered from complications from the transfusion.

In 1929, Brush married Alexander Colclough Dick and they moved to New York City. Their daughter, Sylvia, was born in 1930, but the couple would divorce 17 years later in 1947.

In 1962, Brush married Dr. Lewis C. Walmsley, an educational missionary and Professor at the University of Toronto whom she had first met in 1937 through Margaret Sanger.

Dorothy Brush died on June 4, 1968.

== Honors ==
Because of her continued work with and dedication to Smith College, Brush was awarded a Smith College Medal in October 1967. The medal noted her tireless work with family planning and women's health, her unfailing support of Margaret Sanger, and her numerous contributions to the Sophia Smith Collection and Smith College.

== Controversies ==
When the Brush foundation was formed in 1928 by Dorothy’s father-in-law, Charles F. Bush, it was introduced with the intention of promoting eugenics and as a method of population control, for which it received $500,000 for research. After World War II, when the idea of eugenics became more taboo due to the ethnic cleansing done by Nazis, the Brush foundation shifted its focus from Eugenics to fertility.

== Works ==
=== Plays ===
- One-Eye, Two-Eye and Three-Eye: A Puppet Play for Children in Three Acts (1929) New York: Samuel French
- The Poor Little Turkey Girl: A Play of Pueblo Indian Folk-Lore (1928) New York: Samuel French

=== Books ===
- The American People: A Popular History of the United States, 1865 - 1941 (1943) New York: Sheridan House [with Walter Sumner Hayward]
- Your Land & My Land: The American People from Lincoln to Roosevelt (1943) New York: Sheridan House [with Walter Sumner Hayward]
