= Margaret Hamilton (actress) =

American film actress (1902–1985)

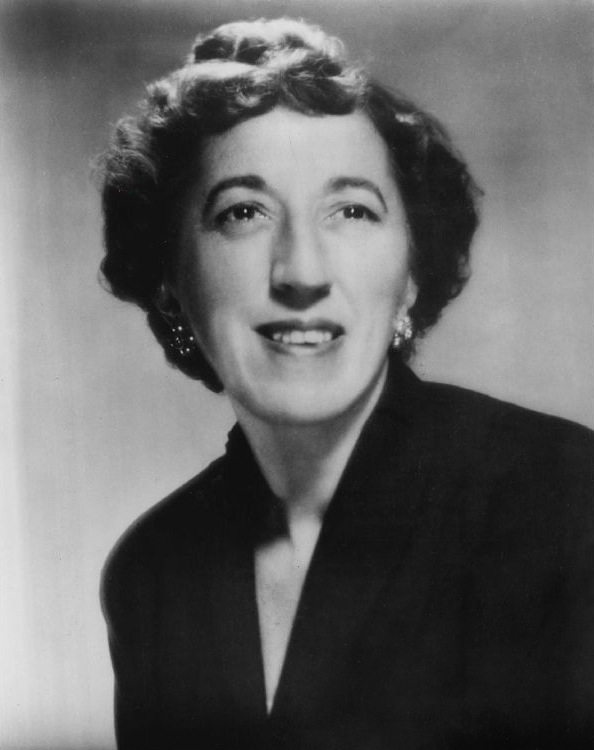
- Hamilton, c. 1958
- Born: Margaret Brainard Hamilton; December 9, 1902; Cleveland, Ohio, U.S.
- Died: May 16, 1985 (aged 82); Salisbury, Connecticut, U.S.
- Education: Wheelock College
- Occupations: Actress, schoolteacher
- Years active: 1929–1984
- Notable work: Almira Gulch and The Wicked Witch of the West in MGM's The Wizard of Oz (1939)
- Spouse: Paul Meserve (m. 1931; div. 1938)
- Children: 1
- Relatives: Neil Hamilton (distant cousin); Dorothy Hamilton Brush (sister)

Margaret Brainard Hamilton (December 9, 1902 – May 16, 1985) was an American actress, vaudevillian and educator, whose fifty-year career in entertainment spanned theater, film, radio and television. She often played villains and is best known to modern audiences for her portrayal of the Wicked Witch of the West and her Kansas counterpart Almira Gulch in the 1939 MGM film The Wizard of Oz.

A former kindergarten teacher, she worked as a character actress in films for seven years before she was offered the role that defined her public image. In later years, Hamilton appeared in films and made frequent cameo appearances on television sitcoms and commercials. She also gained recognition for her work as an animal rights activist and her lifelong commitment to public education.

Her role as the Wicked Witch of the West is ranked by the American Film Institute as Hollywood's fourth-greatest villain of all time and the all-time greatest female villain.

== Early life ==
Hamilton was born in Cleveland, Ohio, the daughter of W.J. Hamilton and Jennie Adams, and practiced her craft doing children's theater while she was a Junior League of Cleveland member. She attended Hathaway Brown School.

Hamilton began her acting career at the Cleveland Play House as an ensemble member in a production of The Brothers Karamazov, while studying acting and Pantomime under Maria Ouspenskaya. Her first major role at the Play House was as the First Witch in a production of Macbeth. She would go on to play numerous comedic roles, including circus performer Charlotta Ivanovna in Chekhov's The Cherry Orchard, and the sultry Miss Prosperine Garnett in Candida. She was praised in the press for her range as both a comedian and a serious actress.

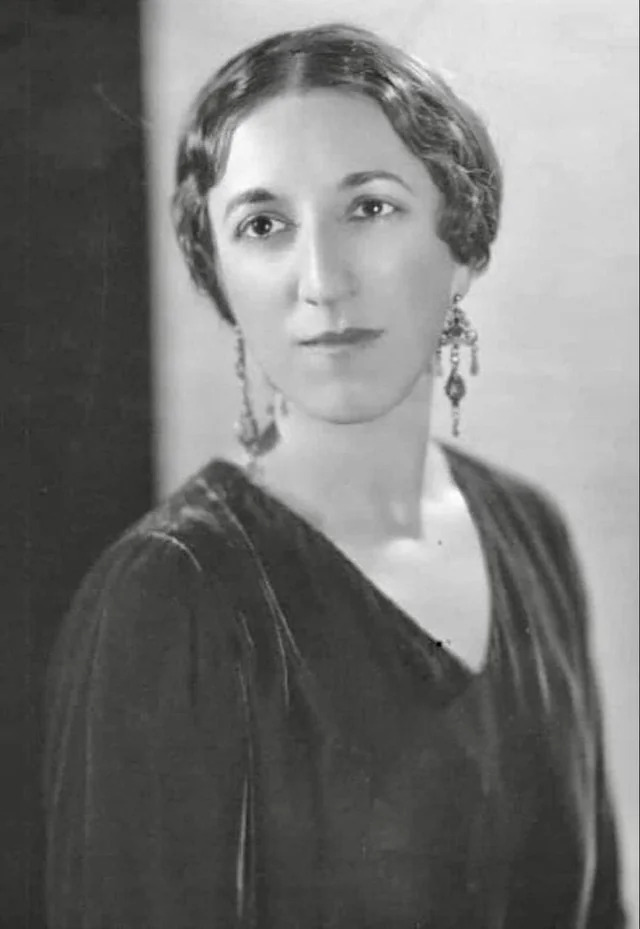
Hamilton in 1929

In December 1929, she starred in a musical vaudeville act titled Heartrending and Humorous Songs of 1840, 1890, and 1929. Before she turned to acting exclusively, her parents insisted she attend Wheelock College in Boston, Massachusetts, which she did, later becoming a kindergarten teacher.

== Film career ==
Hamilton made her screen debut as Helen Hallam in the MGM film adaptation Another Language (1933) starring Helen Hayes and Robert Montgomery, having previously originated the role of Helen Hallam on Broadway. She went on to appear in These Three (1936), Saratoga, You Only Live Once, When's Your Birthday?, Nothing Sacred (all 1937), The Adventures of Tom Sawyer (1938), Mae West's My Little Chickadee (with W. C. Fields, 1940), and The Sin of Harold Diddlebock, with Harold Lloyd, 1947. She strove to work as much as possible to support herself and her son. She never put herself under contract to any one studio and was paid $1,000 a week ($22,400 in today's money).

Hamilton co-starred opposite Buster Keaton and Richard Cromwell in a 1940s spoof of the long-running local melodrama The Drunkard, titled The Villain Still Pursued Her.

Later in the decade, she played the part of Mrs. Theresa Appleby, co-starring with Tom Conway and Richard Cromwell in a little-known and now partially lost film noir, titled Bungalow 13 (1948). She continued appearing in supporting film roles until the early 1950s and sporadically thereafter.

Hamilton played a heavily made-up witch opposite Bud Abbott and Lou Costello in Comin' Round the Mountain. Hamilton's character goes toe-to-toe with Costello's; each with voodoo dolls representing each other. She appeared uncredited in Joseph L. Mankiewicz's People Will Talk (1951) as Sarah Pickett. In 1960, producer/director William Castle cast Hamilton as a housekeeper in his 13 Ghosts horror film, in which 12-year-old lead Charles Herbert's character taunts her about being a witch, including the final scene, in which she is holding a broom in her hand.

On stage and screen, she was known for her rapid fire deadpan delivery, Midwestern accent, and her dark contralto singing voice. Despite standing at only five feet tall, Hamilton's commanding stage presence led to a successful career playing villains, with fans often being surprised by her slight stature.

=== The Wizard of Oz ===
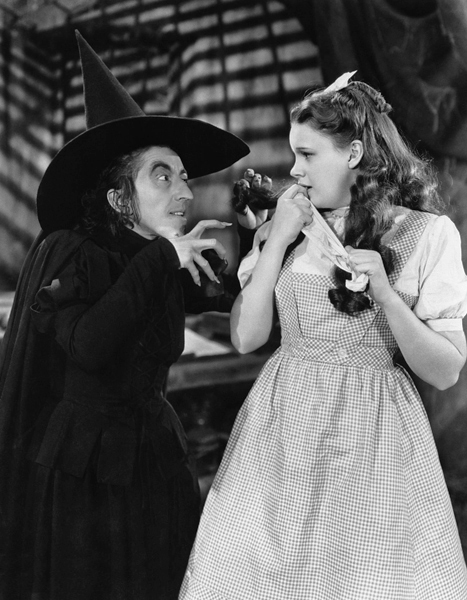
Hamilton as the Wicked Witch of the West with Judy Garland as Dorothy Gale in The Wizard of Oz, 1939

In 1939, Hamilton played the role of the Wicked Witch of the West, her most famous role. Hamilton was cast after Gale Sondergaard, who was first considered for the role, albeit as a more glamorous witch with a musical scene, declined the role when the decision was made that the witch should appear ugly.

On December 23, 1938, Hamilton suffered an on-set accident. During a second take of her fiery exit from Munchkinland, the trap door's drop was delayed to eliminate the brief glimpse of it seen in the final edit, causing her to receive a second-degree burn on her face and a third-degree burn on her hand. She had to recuperate for six weeks after the accident, before returning to the set to complete her work on the film. After she recuperated, she said, "I won't sue, because I know how this business works, and I would never work again. I will return to work on one condition—no more fireworks!" Garland visited Hamilton while the latter recuperated at home, looking after Hamilton's son.

Studio executives cut some of Hamilton's more frightening scenes, worrying they would scare children too much. Later in life, she would comment on the role of the witch in a light-hearted fashion. During one interview, she joked:

So, I had done about six pictures for MGM by the time, and, one day, my agent called and said, 'Maggie,' he said, 'They're really kind of interested in you.' And I said, 'What for?' He said, 'They're sort of interested in you for a part in The Wizard of Oz.' And I said, 'Oh, gosh, think of that!' I said, 'I've loved that story from the time I was four years old. What is it?' And he said, 'Well, The Witch', and I said, 'The Witch?!' and he said, then he said the final thing, he said, 'Yes, what else?'

On February 11, 1939, Hamilton's stand-in and stunt double, Betty Danko, also suffered an on-set accident. Instead of Hamilton, Danko made the fiery entrance to Munchkinland. During the "Surrender Dorothy!" skywriting sequence at the Emerald City, Danko sat on a smoking pipe configured to look like the Witch's broomstick. The pipe exploded on the third take of the scene. She spent 11 days in the hospital and her legs were permanently scarred. The studio hired a replacement stunt double, Aline Goodwin, to finish the scene.

When asked about her experiences with her role in The Wizard of Oz, Hamilton said she was afraid that it would give children a wrong idea of who she really was, since she actually cared deeply about children, frequently giving to charitable organizations. She often remarked about children coming up to her and asking her why she had been so mean to Dorothy. She appeared on an episode of Mister Rogers' Neighborhood in 1975 where she explained to children she was only playing a role and showed how putting on a costume "transformed" her into the witch. She also made personal appearances, and Hamilton described the children's usual reaction to her portrayal of the Witch:

Almost always they want me to laugh like the Witch. And sometimes when I go to schools, if we're in an auditorium, I'll do it. And there's always a funny reaction, like 'Ye gods, they wish they hadn't asked.' They're scared. They're really scared for a second. Even adolescents. I guess for a minute they get the feeling they got when they watched the picture. They like to hear it but they 'don't' like to hear it. And then they go, 'Ooooooh ... !' The picture made a terrible impression of some kind on them, sometimes a ghastly impression, but most of them got over it, I guess ... because when I talk like the Witch, and when I laugh, there is a hesitation and then they clap. They're clapping at hearing the sound again.

In By Your Leave (1934), she played the housekeeper of one of her castmates from The Wizard of Oz, Frank Morgan, and in Saratoga (1937), she has a colloquy with Morgan regarding a cosmetic product he invented, with side glances and eye rolls by Morgan as to its effect on her "beauty". One of Hamilton's lines from The Wizard of Oz—"I'll get you, my pretty, and your little dog, too!"—was ranked 99th in the 2005 American Film Institute survey of the most memorable movie quotes. Her son, interviewed for the 2005 DVD edition of the film, commented that Hamilton enjoyed the line so much, she sometimes used it in her real life.

A few months after filming Oz, she appeared in Babes in Arms (1939) as Jeff Steele's aunt, Martha, a society do-gooder who made it her goal to send the gang of child actors, led by Mickey Rooney and Judy Garland, to a work farm. In 1945, she played the psychotic sister of Oz co-star Jack Haley in George White's Scandals, trying to prevent him from marrying his fiancé, played by Joan Davis, even going so far as attempting to kill her with an axe. Hamilton and Ray Bolger were cast members in the 1966 fantasy film The Daydreamer, a collection of stories by Hans Christian Andersen. A few years later, they were reunited on Broadway for the short-lived musical Come Summer.

== Radio, television, and stage career ==
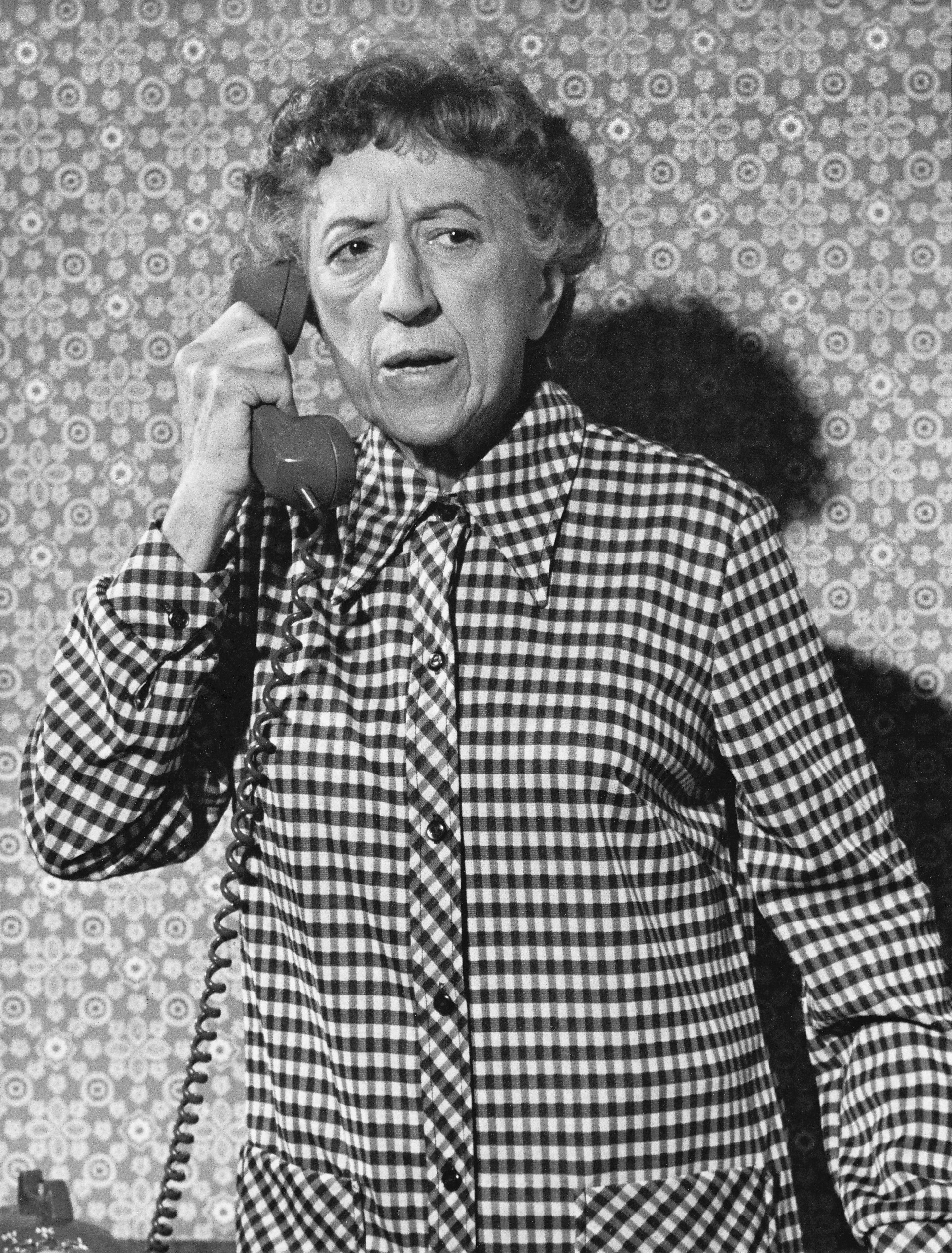
Publicity photo of Hamilton as Miss Eddels in Sigmund and the Sea Monsters

Hamilton made her Broadway debut in 1932, as Helen Hallam in Rose Franken's play Another Language, to immensely positive reviews, praised for her dry wit and comedic timing. In 1943, she played Gertrude Goldsmith in another Franken play, Outrageous Fortune, which was notable for openly tackling antisemitism and homosexuality in the early 1940s. Critics were divided on the play's themes, but Hamilton's performance was praised.

In the 1940s and 1950s, Hamilton had a long-running role on the radio series Ethel and Albert, or The Couple Next Door, in which she played the lovable, scattered Aunt Eva, with her name later changed to Aunt Effie. In 1957, she appeared in two episodes of The Phil Silvers Show. During the 1960s and 1970s, Hamilton appeared regularly on television. She did a stint as a What's My Line? mystery guest on the popular Sunday night CBS-TV program. She played Morticia Addams's mother, Esther Frump, in three episodes of The Addams Family (1965–66). Hamilton had been offered the role of Grandmama, but turned it down.

In 1962, Hamilton played Leora Scofield, a suffragist who arrives in Laramie, Wyoming, to bolster feminist causes in a territory where women had already obtained the right to vote, in the episode "Beyond Justice" of NBC's Laramie.

Having started on the stage in the early 1930s, Hamilton began to work extensively in the theater after leaving Los Angeles. She appeared on Broadway in the musical Goldilocks opposite Don Ameche and Elaine Stritch, and played the domineering Parthy Anne Hawks in the 1966 revival of Show Boat, dancing with David Wayne. In 1968, she played Aunt Eller in the Lincoln Center revival of Oklahoma!. Hamilton toured in many plays and musicals across the United States, starring in The Rivals at Seattle Repertory Theatre and later repeating her role of the Wicked Witch in specially written stage productions of The Wizard of Oz. For her last stage role, she was cast as Madame Armfeldt in the national tour of Stephen Sondheim musical A Little Night Music, costarring with Jean Simmons as her daughter Desiree.

Even with her extensive film career, Hamilton took roles in whatever medium she could get if she was free, making her soap opera debut as the nasty Mrs. Sayre on Valiant Lady, who schemed to prevent her daughter from marrying the heroine's son. In the 1960s, Hamilton was a regular on another CBS soap opera, The Secret Storm, playing the role of Grace Tyrell's housekeeper, Katie. For ABC's short-lived radio anthology Theatre-Five, she played a manipulative, ailing Aunt Lettie to Joan Lorring as the unhappy niece Maude in "Noose of Pearls".

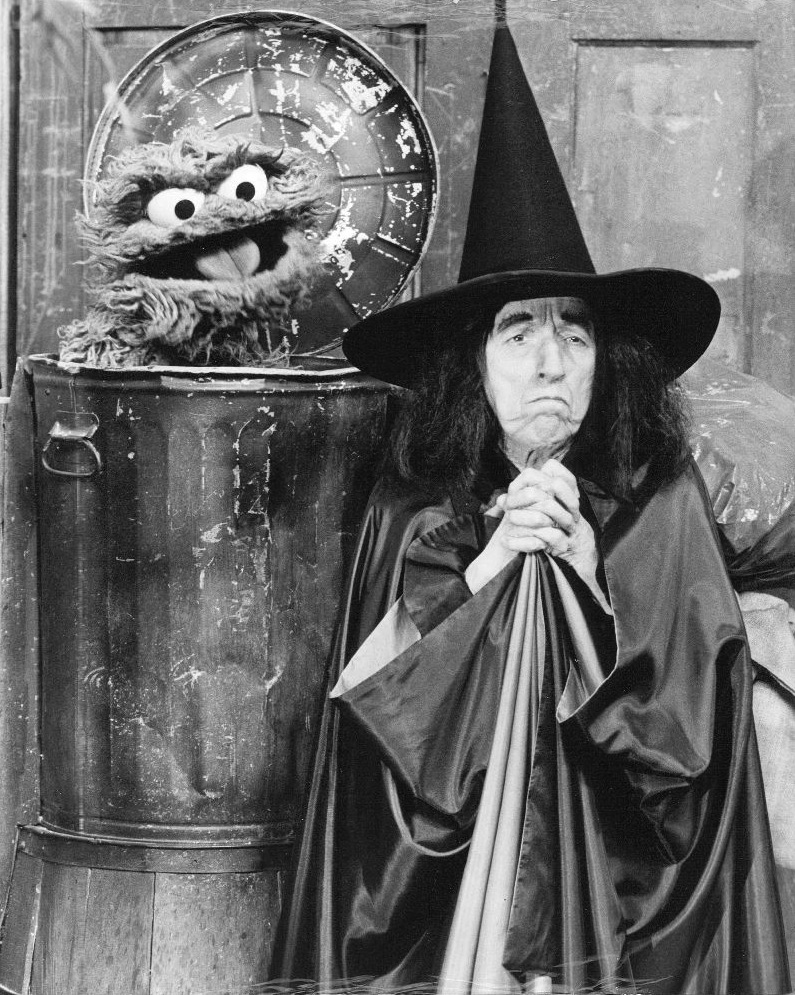
Hamilton with Oscar the Grouch on episode #0847 of Sesame Street, 1976

In the early 1970s, Hamilton joined the cast of another CBS soap opera, As the World Turns, on which she played Miss Peterson, Simon Gilbey's assistant. She had a small role in the made-for-television film The Night Strangler (1973) and appeared as a befuddled neighbor on Sigmund and the Sea Monsters, a friend of the character played by Mary Wickes. In The Paul Lynde Halloween Special (1976), she portrayed Lynde's housekeeper, reprising the Wicked Witch role, as well as introducing Lynde to the rock group Kiss. The Lynde special gave Hamilton a chance to work with another fictional witch, Billie Hayes's Wilhelmina Witchiepoo, whom Hamilton greatly admired. When Hamilton reprised her role as the Wicked Witch in a 1976 episode of Sesame Street, "the show's producers were flooded with letters from parents saying it was too frightening for children." The episode elicited such negative reception from children and parents that it was not rebroadcast for over forty years, and was even believed to have been lost, becoming a fixture of the online lost media community. The episode in its entirety was eventually leaked on Reddit in June 2022.

She appeared as herself in three episodes of Mister Rogers' Neighborhood, between 1975 and 1976, because Fred Rogers wanted his viewers to recognize the Wicked Witch was just a character and not something to be afraid of. Hamilton continued acting regularly until 1982. Her last roles were two guest appearances as veteran journalist Thea Taft in 1979 and 1982, on Lou Grant. She was originally cast as Marie Thornwell in The Facts of Life episode "The Oldest Living Graduate" (Season 4, Episode 4). Due to ill health, she had to drop out last minute, and the role was taken over by actress Amzie Strickland.

Throughout the 1970s, Hamilton lived in New York City's Gramercy Park neighborhood and appeared on local (and some national) public-service announcements for organizations promoting animal welfare. Her most visible appearances during this period were as general store owner, Cora, in a national series of television commercials for Maxwell House coffee. On October 30, 1975, she guest-starred on the radio revival series CBS Radio Mystery Theater. In the episode, entitled "Triptych for a Witch", Hamilton played the title role.

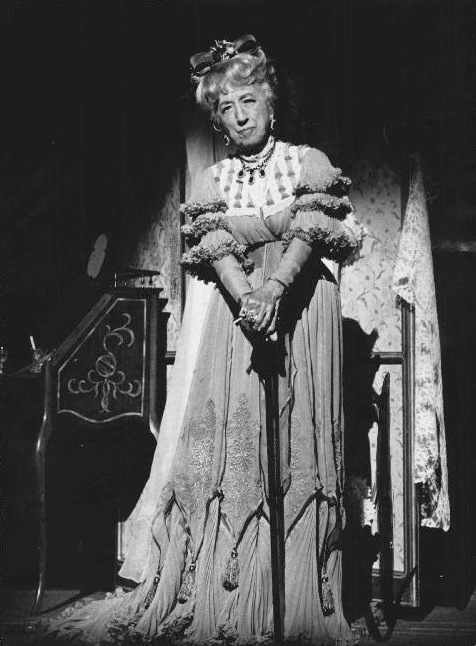
Hamilton as Madame Armfeldt in the national tour of A Little Night Music, 1974

In 1973, Hamilton produced the stage production of An Evening with the Bourgeoisie. Her other mid-1970s stage productions, as the producer, were The Three Sisters and House Party.

== Personal life ==
Hamilton married Paul Boynton Meserve on June 13, 1931, and made her debut on the New York City stage in 1932. While her acting career developed, her marriage began to fail; the couple divorced in 1938. Their separation was publicized, with Hamilton accusing Meserve of physical abuse, including him hitting her and punching her in the face. These allegations were corroborated by the couple's housekeeper, who sued Meserve after alleging he physically attacked her. They had one son, Hamilton "Tony" Wadsworth Meserve, whom she raised on her own after being awarded sole custody. Hamilton had three grandchildren, Christopher, Scott, and Margaret.

Hamilton never remarried, and many details of her romantic life following her divorce remain elusive. Actress Jean Tafler, who portrayed Hamilton in a one-woman show about the character actress called "My Witch: The Margaret Hamilton Stories", said Hamilton "had boyfriends" but also that "it doesn't seem that she had too many long term romantic relationships, though she had many friends." (Tafler and her husband John Ahlin, who wrote the show, did extensive research over many years to tell Hamilton's story. Their research included interviewing Hamilton "Tony" Meserve and his wife, Helen; Hamilton's grandson, Scott; Hamilton's agent, Michael Thomas; Hamilton's niece Sylvia; and actors who worked with Hamilton, among others.) Writer and actor Bruce Vilanch, who worked with Hamilton later in her career, stated that it was well-known in Hollywood that Hamilton was a lesbian.

Her Gramercy Park neighbor Sybil Daneman reported that Hamilton loved children, but they were often afraid to meet her because of her portrayal of the Wicked Witch of the West in The Wizard of Oz. Daneman's nephew refused to meet Hamilton, because even though he understood she was an actress, he thought it was still possible she really was like the character in the movie.

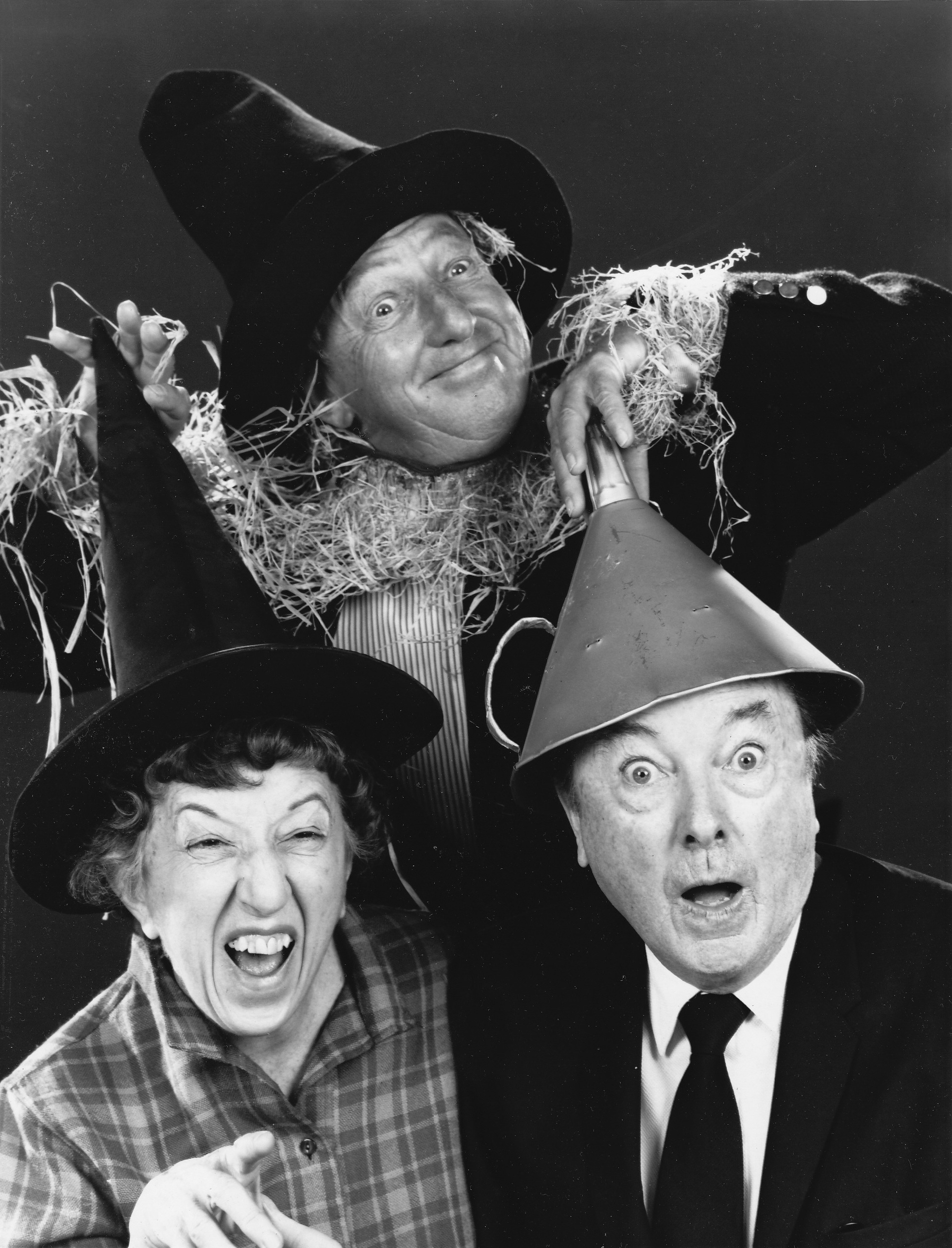
Margaret Hamilton, Ray Bolger and Jack Haley reunited in 1970, a year after the death of co-star Judy Garland.

Hamilton became close friends with The Wizard of Oz castmate Judy Garland, acting as a mentor and confidant. While filming Babes in Arms the same year with Garland, Garland would ask Hamilton to spend time in her dressing room with her, as her mother would not berate her in the presence of another adult. Garland affectionately referred to Hamilton as "my witch". Hamilton also remained a lifelong friend of The Wizard of Oz castmate Ray Bolger (who played the Scarecrow), and was also close friends with Harpo Marx.

== Final years and death ==
Hamilton's early experience as a teacher fueled a lifelong interest in educational issues. She served on the Beverly Hills Board of Education from 1948 to 1951 and was a Sunday school teacher during the 1950s. Hamilton lived in New York City for most of her adult life, and summered in a cottage on Cape Island, Southport, Maine. She was a guest speaker at a University of Connecticut children's literature class.

Hamilton later moved to Millbrook, New York. She was admitted to a nursing home in Salisbury, Connecticut, six months before her death from a suspected heart attack on May 16, 1985, at the age of 82. Hamilton's remains were cremated.

== Filmography ==
=== Film ===
Year	Title	Role	Notes
1933	Zoo in Budapest	Assistant Matron for orphans	Uncredited
1933	Another Language	Helen Hallam	
1934	Hat, Coat, and Glove	Madame Du Barry	
1934	There's Always Tomorrow	Ella	
1934	By Your Leave	Whiffen	
1934	Broadway Bill	Edna	
1935	The Farmer Takes a Wife	Lucy Gurget	
1935	Way Down East	Martha Perkins	
1936	Chatterbox	Emily 'Tippie' Tipton	
1936	These Three	Agatha	
1936	The Moon's Our Home	Mitty Simpson	
1936	The Witness Chair	Grace Franklin	
1936	Laughing at Trouble	Lizzie Beadle	
1937	You Only Live Once	Hester	
1937	When's Your Birthday?	Mossy	
1937	The Good Old Soak	Minnie	
1937	Mountain Justice	Phoebe Lamb	
1937	Saratoga	Maizie	Uncredited
1937	I'll Take Romance	Margot	
1937	Nothing Sacred	Vermont Drugstore Lady	
1938	The Adventures of Tom Sawyer	Mrs. Harper	
1938	A Slight Case of Murder	Mrs. Cagle	
1938	Mother Carey's Chickens	Mrs. Pauline Fuller	
1938	Four's a Crowd	Amy	
1938	Breaking the Ice	Mrs. Small	
1938	Stablemates	Beulah Flanders	
1939	The Wizard of Oz	Almira Gulch / The Wicked Witch of the West	
1939	The Angels Wash Their Faces	Miss Hannaberry	
1939	Babes in Arms	Martha Steele	
1939	Main Street Lawyer	Lucy, Boggs' Housekeeper	
1940	My Little Chickadee	Mrs. Gideon	
1940	The Villain Still Pursued Her	Mrs. Wilson	
1940	I'm Nobody's Sweetheart Now	Mrs. Thriffie	
1940	The Invisible Woman	Mrs. Jackson	
1941	Play Girl	Josie	
1941	The Gay Vagabond	Agatha Badger	
1942	Twin Beds	Norah	
1942	Meet the Stewarts	Willametta	
1942	The Affairs of Martha	Guinevere	
1943	City Without Men	Dora	
1943	The Ox-Bow Incident	Mrs. Larch	Uncredited
1943	Johnny Come Lately	Myrtle Ferguson	
1944	Guest in the House	Hilda – the Maid	
1945	George White's Scandals	Clarabelle Evans	
1946	Janie Gets Married	Mrs. Angles	
1946	Faithful in My Fashion	Miss Applegate	
1947	The Sin of Harold Diddlebock	Flora	
1947	Dishonored Lady	Mrs. Geiger	
1947	Pet Peeves	Haughty Woman	Short film, uncredited
1947	Driftwood	Essie Keenan	
1948	Reaching from Heaven	Sophie Manley	
1948	State of the Union	Norah	
1948	Texas, Brooklyn & Heaven	Ruby Cheever	
1948	Bungalow 13	Mrs. Theresa Appleby	Partially lost film
1949	The Sun Comes Up	Mrs. Golightly	
1949	The Red Pony	Teacher	
1949	The Beautiful Blonde from Bashful Bend	Mrs. Elvira O'Toole	Uncredited
1950	The Great Plane Robbery	Mrs. Judd	Lost film
1950	Wabash Avenue	Tillie Hutch	
1950	Riding High	Edna	
1951	Comin' Round the Mountain	Aunt Huddy	
1951	People Will Talk	Miss Sarah Pickett – Housekeeper	Uncredited
1960	13 Ghosts	Elaine Zacharides	
1962	The Good Years	Narrator	
1962	Paradise Alley	Mrs. Nicholson	
1964	Charlie Weaver		John Deere film
1966	The Daydreamer	Mrs. Klopplebobbler	
1967	Rosie!	Mae	
1969	Angel in My Pocket	Rhoda	
1970	Brewster McCloud	Daphne Heap	
1971	The Anderson Tapes	Miss Kaler	
1972	Journey Back to Oz	Aunt Em	Voice

=== Television ===
Year	Title	Role	Notes
1950–1951	The Bigelow Theatre	Mrs. Greenstreet	Episodes: "Papa Romani" (S 1:Ep 2); "Dear Amanda" (S 1:Ep 15)
1952	Gulf Playhouse	Guest	Episode: (S 1:Ep 3)
1952	My Hero	Mrs. Morgan	Episode: "Lady Mortician" (S 1:Ep 2)
1953	Lux Video Theatre	Charity Ames	Episode: "Wind on the Way" (S 3:Ep 42)
1953	Ethel and Albert	Aunt Eva	2 episodes
1953	Man Against Crime	Mrs. Barker	Episode: "A Family Affair" (S 4:Ep 26)
1953	A String of Blue Beads	Mrs. Loomis	Television film
1953	Man Against Crime	Mrs. Parmalee	Episode: "Petite Larceny" (S 5:Ep 11)
1954	The Campbell Playhouse	Guest	Episode: "An Eye for an Eye" (S 2:Ep 35)
1954	The Best of Broadway	Sarah	Episode: "The Man Who Came to Dinner" (S 1:Ep 2)
1954	Center Stage	Guest	Episode: "Lucky Louie" (S 1:Ep 5)
1954	The Elgin Hour	Gwen	Episode: "Warm Clay" (S 1:Ep 4)
1955	The Best of Broadway	Usher	Episode: "The Guardsman" (S 1:Ep 7)
1955	Valiant Lady	Mrs. Sayre	Main cast member
1955	The Devil's Disciple	Mrs. Dudgeon	TV movie
1955	The Way of the World	Guest	Short lived TV series
1957	On Borrowed Time	Demetria Riffle	Television film
1957	The Phil Silvers Show	Miss Gloria Formby / Hermione Nightengale	2 episodes
1958	The Christmas Tree	Miss Finch	Television film
1959	Once Upon a Christmas Time	Miss Scugg	Television film
1960	Dow Hour of Great Mysteries	Lizzie Allen	Episode: "The Bat" (S 1:Ep 1), based on the play of the same name by Mary Roberts Rinehart
1960	The Secret World of Eddie Hodges	Mrs. Grundy	Television film
1961	Ichabod and Me	Mehitabel Hobbs	Episode: "The Purple Cow (S 1:Ep 6)
1962	Laramie	Leora Scofield	Episode: "Beyond Justice" (S 4:Ep 9)
1962	The Danny Thomas Show	Miss Fenwick	Episode: "Bunny, the Brownie Leader" (S 10:Ep 13)
1962	Car 54, Where Are You?	Spinster	Episode: "Benny the Bookie's Last Chance" (S 2:Ep 17)
1962	The Patty Duke Show	The Lane Family housekeeper	Episode: "Double Date" (S 1:Ep 10)
1962	Car 54, Where Are You?	Miss Pownthleroy	Episode: "Here Comes Charlie" (S 2:Ep 23)
1962	The Patty Duke Show	Mrs. Williams	Episode: "Let 'Em Eat Cake" (S 1:Ep 21)
1964–1967	The Secret Storm	Katie	Recurring
1965–1966	The Addams Family	Hester Frump	Recurring
1967	Ghostbreakers	Ivy Rumson	Television film
1968	The Merv Griffin Show	Guest	Judy Garland was guest hosting 2 shows
1970	As the World Turns	Miss Peterson #2	Recurring
1971	Is There a Doctor in the House	Emma Proctor	Television film
1973	Sigmund and the Sea Monsters	Mrs. Eddels	Recurring
1973	Gunsmoke	Edsel Pry	Episode: "A Quiet Day in Dodge" (S 18:Ep 19)
1973	The Night Strangler	Professor Crabwell	Television film
1973	The Partridge Family	Clara Kincaid	Episode: "Reuben Kincaid Lives" (S 4:Ep 5)
1975–1976	Mister Rogers' Neighborhood	Herself / Margaret H. Witch	4 episodes
1976	Sesame Street	Herself / Wicked Witch of the West	Episode: Episode #7.52 (S 7:Ep 52)
1976	The Paul Lynde Halloween Special	The Wicked Witch of the West	Reprisal for a Halloween Special
1979	Letters from Frank	Grandma Miller	Television film
1979–1982	Lou Grant	Thea Taft	2 episodes
1982	Pardon Me For Living	Miss Holderness	Television film

=== Stage ===
Year	Title	Role	Notes
1923	The Man Who Ate Potomac	Ensemble	Cleveland Play House
1927	The Brothers Karamazov	Ensemble	Cleveland Play House
1927	Macbeth	First Witch	Cleveland Play House
1928	The Cherry Orchard	Charlotta Ivanovna	Cleveland Play House
1929	Candida	Miss Proserpine Garnett	Cleveland Play House
1932	Another Language	Helen Hallam	Booth Theatre, Broadway
1933	The Dark Tower	Hattie	Morosco Theater, Broadway
1934	The Farmer Takes a Wife	Lucy Gurget	46th Street Theatre, Broadway
1943	Outrageous Fortune	Gertrude	48th Street Theatre, Broadway
1948	The Men We Marry	Gwennie	Mansfield Theatre, Broadway
1950	Little Boy Blue	Aunt Addie	National Tour
1952	Fancy Meeting You Again	Lucy Bascomb	Royale Theatre, Broadway
1956	Diary of a Scoundrel	Madame Kleopatra Mamaeva	Phoenix Theatre, Broadway
1957	The Wizard of Oz	Wicked Witch of the West	The Muny
1958	Goldilocks	Bessie	Lunt-Fontanne Theatre, Broadway
1958	Annie Get Your Gun	Dolly Tate	New York City Center, Off-Broadway
1960	Meet Me in St. Louis	Katie	Music Fair Circuit Production
1961	The Wizard of Oz	Wicked Witch of the West	Casa Mañana
1962	The Wizard of Oz	Wicked Witch of the West	The Muny
1966	Utbu	Connie Tufford	Helen Hayes Theater, Broadway
1966	Show Boat	Parthy Ann Hawks	O'Keefe Centre for the Performing Arts
1966	Show Boat	Parthy Ann Hawks	New York State Theatre, Off-Broadway
1966	Blithe Spirit	Madame Arcati	Seattle Repertory Theatre
1968	The Rivals	Mrs. Malaprop	Seattle Repertory Theatre
1969	Come Summer	Dorinda Pratt	Lunt-Fontanne Theatre, Broadway
1969	Our Town	Mrs. Soames	Anta Theatre, Broadway
1969	Oklahoma!	Aunt Eller	New York State Theater, Off-Broadway
1971	Ring Round the Moon	Madame Desmermortes	Seattle Repertory Theatre
1974	A Little Night Music	Madame Armfeldt	National Tour
1975	The Wizard of Oz	Wicked Witch of the West	National Tour

== See also ==
- Miss Gulch Returns!, 1979 play
