= Grampa in Oz =

1924 book by Ruth Plumly Thompson

- Cover of Grampa in Oz
- Author: Ruth Plumly Thompson
- Illustrator: John R. Neill
- Language: English
- Series: The Oz books
- Genre: Children's novel
- Publisher: Reilly & Lee
- Publication date: July 1, 1924
- Publication place: United States
- Media type: Print (hardcover
- Pages: 271
- Preceded by: The Cowardly Lion of Oz
- Followed by: The Lost King of Oz

Grampa in Oz (1924) is the eighteenth book in the Oz series created by L. Frank Baum and his successors, and the fourth written by Ruth Plumly Thompson. Unlike in Baum's books, Grampa in Oz presents a kingdom in Oz that has a monetary economy, and is on the verge of economic collapse. It was followed by The Lost King of Oz (1925).

== Plot ==
Things are going from bad to worse in the dilapidated kingdom of Ragbad; even the rag crop is failing. To top it all off (or not), King Fumbo's head is blown away in a ferocious storm (with "ten thousand pounds of thunder"). Prince Tatters of Ragbad, and Grampa, a former soldier and the bravest man in the kingdom (population 27), set out on a three-fold quest: for King Fumbo's lost head, a fortune to save the bankrupt kingdom, and a princess for Tatters to marry. They are joined by Bill, an iron weathercock from Chicago, who was brought to life by an electrical storm and blown to Oz.

Meanwhile, in Perhaps City in the Maybe Mountains, the Princess Pretty Good has a problem: the prophet Abrog (also known as Gorba) foresees her marrying a monster if she does not marry in four days. (He suggests himself as her bridegroom.) When Pretty Good resists, Abrog kidnaps her and tries to transform her into a clod of earth; but since she is, in fact, more than just pretty good, as princesses go, Pretty Good turns into the beautiful flower fairy Urtha.

Wide-ranging adventures — from Fire Island to Monday Mountain — culminate in the location and restoration of King Fumbo's head. Dorothy (with the help of Percy Vere the forgetful poet) manages to restore order. Prince Tatters ends up married to Princess Pretty Good — which is pretty good for him.

The Oz books
Previous book: The Cowardly Lion of Oz	Grampa in Oz; 1924	Next book: The Lost King of Oz
