= The Lost King of Oz =

1925 book by Ruth Plumly Thompson

- First edition cover of The Lost King of Oz
- Author: Ruth Plumly Thompson
- Illustrator: John R. Neill
- Language: English
- Series: The Oz books
- Genre: Children's novel
- Publisher: Reilly & Lee
- Publication date: 1925
- Publication place: United States
- Media type: Print (Hardcover)
- Pages: 280
- Preceded by: Grampa in Oz
- Followed by: The Hungry Tiger of Oz

The Lost King of Oz (1925) is the nineteenth book in the Oz series created by L. Frank Baum and his successors, and the fifth written by Ruth Plumly Thompson. It was illustrated by John R. Neill. The novel was followed by The Hungry Tiger of Oz (1926).

The book went into the public domain on January 1, 2021.

== Thompson's approach ==
As she sometimes does in her books, Thompson exploits a detail in Baum's work to generate her story. Baum mentions Pastoria, Ozma's father and former ruler of Oz, only briefly in the twentieth chapter of The Marvelous Land of Oz (1904); Thompson spins Baum's hint into a full tale of Pastoria's exile and rescue.

Thompson dedicated The Lost King of Oz to her invalid mother. She suggested to her publishers that the dedication be made in the form of a crossword puzzle — but Reilly & Lee rejected the idea.

== Plot summary ==
Old Mombi, formerly the Wicked Witch of the North, is now a cook in the land of Kimbaloo. One day she comes across Pajuka, the former prime minister of Oz, transformed by Mombi into a goose years before. She sets out to find Pastoria, the king of Oz, whom she also enchanted in the past. However, she has forgotten what shape she transformed Pastoria into. She kidnaps a local boy called Snip as her unwilling assistant and bearer of burdens. Eventually deciding, however, that he knows too much, Mombi throws Snip down a well; he ends up in Blankenburg, populated by the invisible Blanks. Snip meets and soon rescues Tora, an amnesiac old tailor. Tora has been held prisoner for many years by the Blanks, to do their tailoring; he has compensated by sending his detachable ears flying about the countryside to hear the news.

Meanwhile, Dorothy is accidentally transported to Hollywood, where she meets Humpy, a live stunt dummy, whom she brings back to Oz. They escape the Back Talkers in Eht Kcab Sdoow (by running backwards), and meet the Scooters who help scoot them on their way. Kabumpo the Elegant Elephant shows up to provide transport (of the mundane sort). Dorothy's party encounters Snip and Tora, and Mombi and Pajuka too. They come to the conclusion that Humpy the dummy is the enchanted Pastoria.

Eventually, matters are clarified and settled: Pajuka is restored to humanity, but Humpy proves not to be the missing king after all. Old Tora is disenchanted and turns out to be Pastoria. He spurns any notion of returning to his throne, however; he is content to settle down as a humble tailor in the Emerald City, with Snip as his apprentice and Humpy as his tailor's dummy.

In a rare act of Ozite capital punishment, Mombi is ruthlessly doused with water and melts away like the Wicked Witch of the West, so that nothing is left of her but her buckled shoes.

== Promotion ==
Reilly & Lee took a new approach to publicizing its Oz books in 1925. Thompson wrote a short play for child actors titled A Day in Oz, with songs composed by Norman Sherrerd. The play was performed in bookstores and department stores by local children, with costumes provided by Reilly & Lee. The performances promoted each year's Oz book, and continued through the 1920s.

== Reception ==
In A Brief Guide to Oz, Paul Simpson notes that Mombi being put to death "caused considerable controversy with Oz fans."

The Oz books
Previous book: Grampa in Oz	The Lost King of Oz; 1925	Next book: The Hungry Tiger of Oz
