= The Cowardly Lion of Oz =

1923 book by Ruth Plumly Thompson

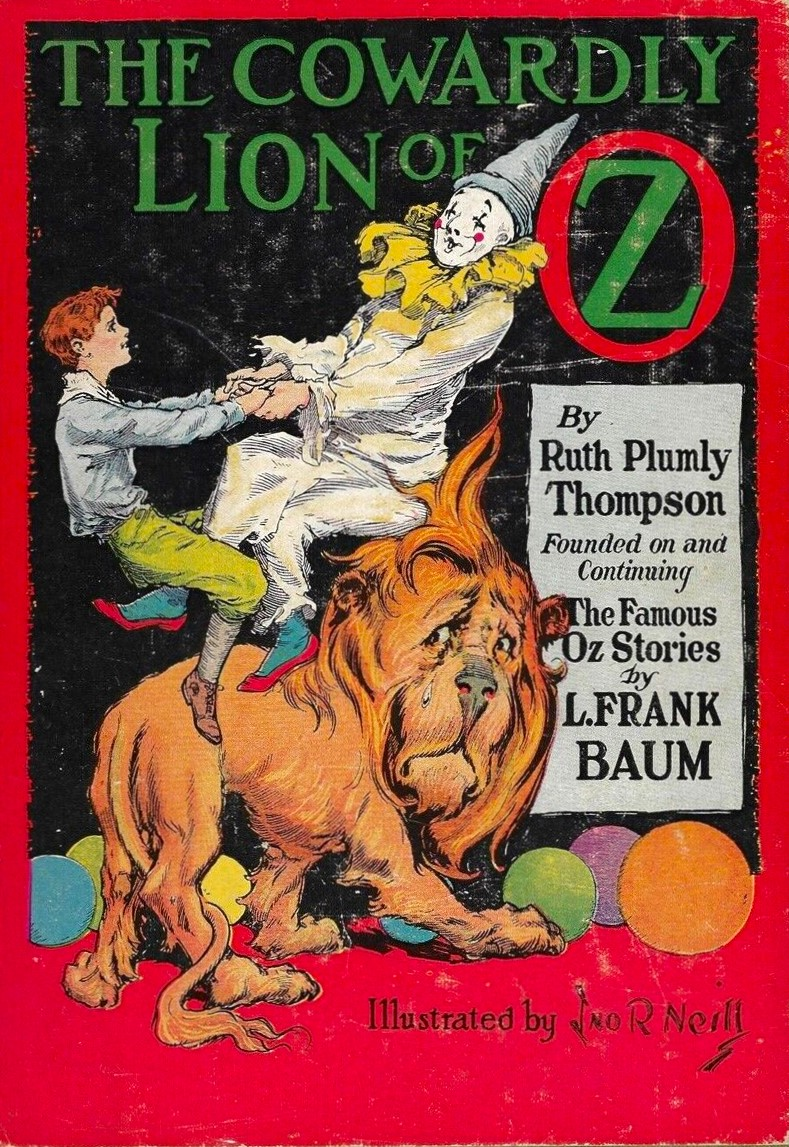
- Cover of The Cowardly Lion of Oz.
- Author: Ruth Plumly Thompson
- Illustrator: John R. Neill
- Language: English
- Series: The Oz books
- Genre: Children's novel
- Publisher: Reilly & Lee
- Publication date: 1923
- Publication place: United States
- Media type: Print (Hardcover)
- Pages: 291
- Preceded by: Kabumpo in Oz
- Followed by: Grampa in Oz

The Cowardly Lion of Oz (1923) is the seventeenth book in the Oz series created by L. Frank Baum and his successors, and the third written by Ruth Plumly Thompson. It was illustrated by John R. Neill. The book was followed by Grampa in Oz (1924).

== Plot ==
The story opens with Mustafa of Mudge, a turbaned desert monarch with blue whiskers, who collects lions. Mustafa demands one more lion — he already has nine thousand nine hundred and ninety nine and a half lions, but there are no more lions in Mudge, and Mudgers are forbidden by Ozma, on penalty of death, to travel beyond the desert borders of Mudge. However, when Notta Bit More, a clown from the circus in Stumptown (somewhere in the humdrum backblocks of the United States of America), and a serious-minded orphan boy called Bobbie Downs (but renamed as Bob Up, by the cheerful Notta) drop into Mudge together, this seems to Mustafa to be his chance to send a non-Mudge person out to bring the famous Cowardly Lion to be the ten thousandth lion in Mudge. Using a magic ring, he enchants Notta and Bob and compels them to set out on a quest to capture the Cowardly Lion.

Meanwhile, in the Emerald City, the Cowardly Lion believes that he has depleted the reserve of courage imbued in him by the Wizard (as told in The Wonderful Wizard of Oz). The mischievous Patchwork Girl, Scraps (who was first introduced in an earlier Baum-written title), misdirects the Lion into thinking that he can replenish his courage by eating a courageous man. Since the Lion dislikes the notion of harming anyone, he resolves to do the deed as quickly as possible, and so embarks on his quest to find, and eat, the bravest man in Oz.

Unbeknownst to the Cowardly Lion, he is being hunted by Notta Bit More and Bob Up. Accidentally, the three meet each other. Concealing their objective from the lion, Notta and Bob resolve to trick him into going to Mudge.

The three adventurers fall into a trap and are transported to the unexpected and unhappy Island of Un, which floats in the sky. The feathery, bird-headed people of Un are all thoroughly “unish“, or negative: unfriendly, unkind, ungrateful, and so on. The travellers meet a remarkable bird called Nickadoodle who tells them that if they remain on the isle of Un, they will grow feathers and become bird-like creatures themselves. Together, they escape the Island of Un in a flyaboutabus, which is a flying machine fitted with whirling feathered wheels.

The Cowardly Lion, Notta, and Bob become fast friends, and reveal their secret plans to each other. The Cowardly Lion rejects his former plan to eat a brave man, and the travelers separate, the lion making his way to Mudge to appease Mustafa and prevent him from using his magic ring against Notta and Bob. Notta and Bob set out for the Emerald City to appeal to Ozma for help.

The Cowardly Lion encounters Crunch, a stone giant, who joins him. Together they reach Mudge, where the giant transforms the Cowardly Lion into a stone statue to keep him company. However, Notta, Bob, Ozma, and the Wizard of Oz arrive and reverse the giant's transformation. Ozma takes away Mustafa's magic ring and order is restored.

== Reception ==
The Charlotte Observer called the book "adventurous, thrilling and very humorous... There is never a dull minute in the story."

Baum biographer Katharine M. Rogers criticizes the book for not having a strong child lead character, as most other Oz books do. She writes, "The protagonist of The Cowardly Lion of Oz is an adult clown, not the pallid, passive orphan boy Bob Up."

The Oz books
Previous book: Kabumpo in Oz	The Cowardly Lion of Oz; 1923	Next book: Grampa in Oz
