= Fred Barton (composer) =

American pianist, composer, lyricist, actor, singer and conductor (born 1958)

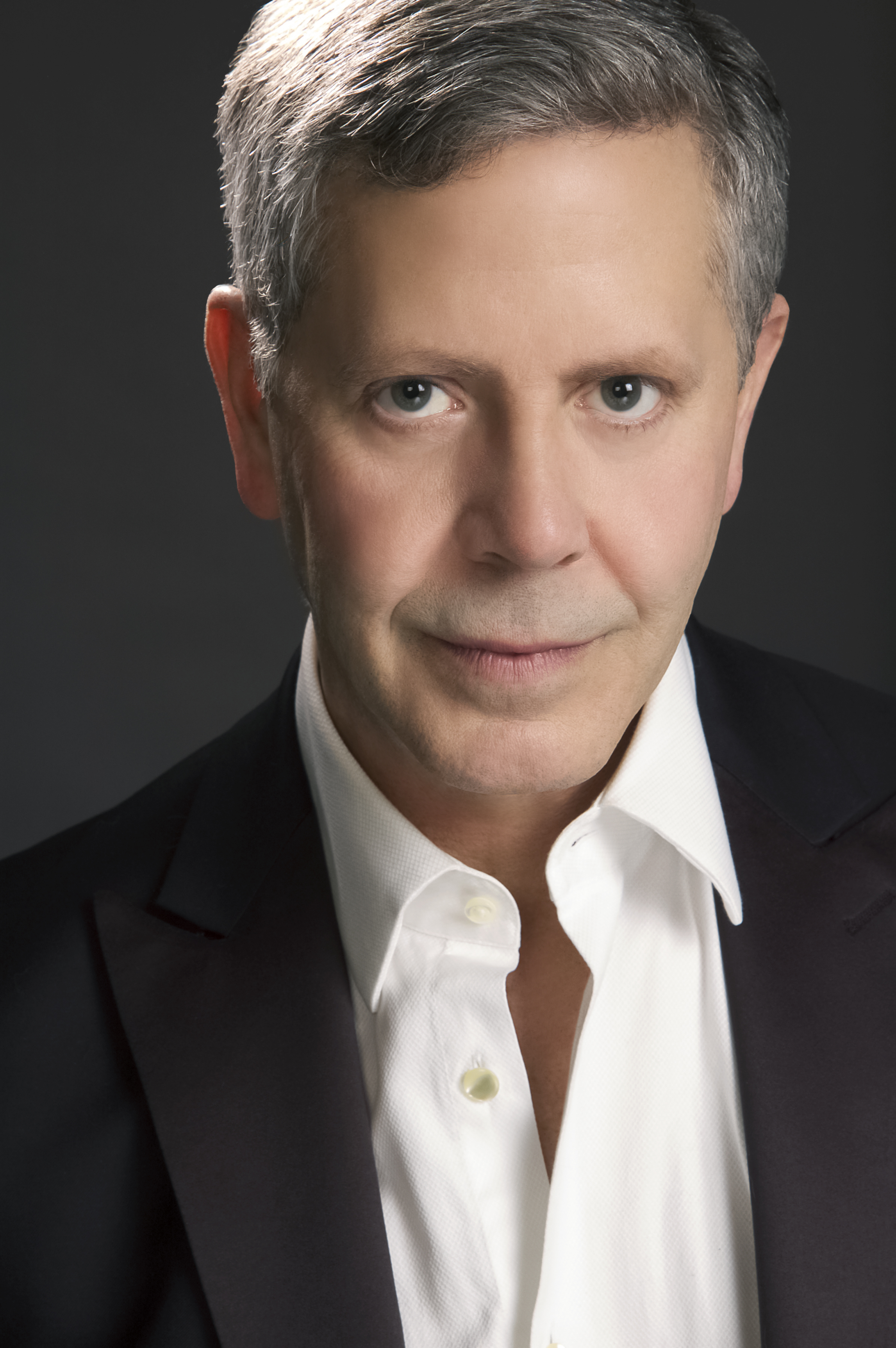

Background information
- Born: October 20, 1958 (age 67)
- Occupations: composer, lyricist, director, actor, singer, arranger, conductor, pianist
- Instruments: Piano, vocals, orchestration
- Years active: 1977-present
- Website: www.fredbarton.com

Fred Barton (born October 20, 1958) is an American composer, lyricist, director, actor, singer, arranger, conductor, and pianist. He made his New York debut in 1982 as co-creator-arranger-performer-pianist in the original company of the long-running revue Forbidden Broadway, appearing in the New York, Los Angeles and Boston productions for 2,000 performances, and on the cast album for DRG Records. In 1985 the show won a Drama Desk Award. Forbidden Broadway ran for 27 years off-Broadway, and won a special Tony Award in 2006.

== Early life ==
Barton grew up in Lexington, Massachusetts, the son of prominent radar scientist David K. Barton and Ruth Barton. His mother's family included generations of musicians, including her first cousin Paul Desmond, the jazz saxophonist.

He has a B.A. in Music from Harvard University, where he wrote numerous musical comedies and revues with collaborator Andy Borowitz, including the Hasty Pudding Theatricals's 130th annual production, "A Thousand Clones." Barton has a Master's degree in Film and Television Music from the University of Southern California, where he won the annual Harry Warren Award in that field.

== Career ==
On Broadway, Fred Barton was Associate Conductor of the 1987 revival of Cabaret, directed by Hal Prince and starring Joel Grey, Alyson Reed, Regina Resnik, and Werner Klemperer. He also served as Associate Conductor of "Zorba", starring Anthony Quinn, as well as the national touring production of Camelot, starring Robert Goulet, and the Los Angeles and national touring productions of "City of Angels."

As a TV composer, he has served as Associate Composer of Scholastic's hit series The Magic School Bus (starring Lily Tomlin), still airing worldwide; Musical Supervisor of the international hit show Olivia, orchestrator and conductor of the Emmy-Award-winning Wonder Pets; and Associate Composer of the ACE-Award-winning series "Eureeka's Castle on Nickelodeon. He also contributed music to Michael Moore's series The Awful Truth.

In 2009 Fred Barton appeared as himself, and musical-directed Cathouse: The Musical produced and broadcast by HBO.

Fred Barton is a prolific arranger for symphony orchestras. He arranged and orchestrated Megan Hilty's symphonic concerts, currently being played around the country, and regularly arranges for The New York Pops Orchestra at Carnegie Hall, the National Symphony Orchestra, Houston Symphony, and the Oklahoma City Philharmonic. His symphony arrangements have been performed by Kelli O’Hara, Beth Leavel, Max von Essen, Cheyenne Jackson, and Cynthia Erivo. Since 2004 Fred Barton has been Senior Orchestrator for the Indianapolis Pops Orchestra, and his orchestrations for their productions are played almost weekly by symphonies throughout the USA and Canada. Keith Lockhart and the Boston Pops Orchestra premiered two of Fred's compositions, "Cornball Concerto" and "Nocturne In Mancini," in 2005. Pop singer Michael Cavanaugh tours the country with Fred's symphonic arrangements of Billy Joel and Elton John songs. Barton made his Carnegie Hall debut in May, 2011 with orchestrations for the New York Pops's annual Gala starring Angela Lansbury and Tyne Daly, and his orchestrations of Irving Berlin songs were presented in concert by the New York Pops in October, 2011, with Barton at the piano. The New York Pops performs Barton’s arrangements annually at its Christmas concerts at Carnegie Hall.

Following the success of "Forbidden Broadway," Barton opened his second contribution to the off-Broadway field in 1985: "Miss Gulch Returns!," a one-man musical theatre piece that has been produced in theatres and cabarets across the United States and features the song "Pour Me a Man," which remains a popular cabaret song since its debut.

His third off-Broadway show, for which he served as musical director and arranger, "Whoop-Dee-Doo!," ran 271 performances in New York, won two Drama Desk Awards, including Best Musical Revue, was recorded by RCA Records, and was subsequently produced in London (with Barton's song "I'm Of Two Minds" added.) A new edition of "Whoop-Dee-Doo" was subsequently produced under the title "When Pigs Fly."

In 2016, Barton joined forces once more with "Forbidden Broadway's" author Gerard Alessandrini, music-directing and creating the vocal arrangements for "Spamilton," a parody of the hit musical "Hamilton (musical)." The show won the Off-Broadway Alliance Awards for "Best Unique Theatrical Experience." Barton subsequently music-supervised productions of "Spamilton" in Chicago, Los Angeles, London, at the Pittsburgh Civic Light Opera, and a national tour now in its second year.

Fred Barton has arranged, orchestrated and appeared on numerous CDs with performers including Karen Akers, Judy Kaye, Karen Murphy, and Neva Small. In 1998 he arranged and conducted the CD "A Wrinkle In Swingtime," with singer Elena Bennett and his 27-piece orchestra.

From 2012 to 2017, Fred Barton produced, hosted, arranged and conducted ten editions of "American Showstoppers: Classic Show Tunes In Concert with The Fred Barton Orchestra" at the Michael Schimmel Center for the Arts at Pace University. Guest performers included Vivian Reed, Beth Leavel, and Lee Roy Reams, among dozens of other Broadway headliners.

From 2017 to the present, the eight-piece Fred Barton Broadway Band has performed regularly at New York's supper club Feinstein's/54 Below with evenings of “Broadway Rarities and Swing Novelties,” featuring Broadway personalities such as Michele Ragusa and American Idol veteran John Preator. From 2011 to 2012 he appeared once a month at New York's Metropolitan Room with his 9-piece Broadway Band, in a show called "Fred Barton Presents – And Thinks You're Gonna Love It!" Each performance featured classic Broadway songs, and his guest singers included Anita Gillette, Pamela Myers, Drama-Desk-winner Toni DiBuono, Karen Murphy, Damon Kirsche, Elena Bennett, Karen Wilder, Jesse Luttrell, Kevin Earley, and Lee Roy Reams.

Barton wrote book, music and lyrics for the off-Broadway musical "The Two Svengalis," starring Toni DiBuono, and with director-choreographer Scott Thompson has co-written the book and provided arrangements and orchestrations for the Broadway-bound musical "One For My Baby," featuring the music of Harold Arlen. Fred Barton is currently writing a "politically incorrect" gay off-Broadway revue entitled "Pants On Fire," and a Broadway-bound musical based on the Newport sex scandal.

Fred Barton is a skilled lifelong genealogist, and as a curator at Geni.com, he has added 19,000 Czech, Dutch, English, and Irish ancestors and relatives to the World Tree.

== Reviews ==
"Fred’s orchestration and direction spins a broad, colorful spectrum of evocations: romantic, refreshing, celebratory, lush, reminiscent, resplendent. The Fred Barton Broadway Band is a gift to New York performance. It illuminates timeless classics, classics of our time and contemporary music. Such grand, glorious harmonies revive the heyday of New York’s nightlife, and that is a sublime achievement." – Lisa Joy Reitman-Dobi, Theatre Pizzazz

"His piano accompaniment is uncommonly rich—not only when he works with Bennett on arrangements they've performed before, which are terrific, but even when accompanying someone new on a song he's playing for the first time. Barton went beyond accompanying skillfully: he supplied coloration that was both pleasing in its own right and supportive of the vocal. On occasion, Barton will perform a number on his own; he knows how to interpret a lyric and how to put a song across." – Roy Sander, Back Stage Bistro Awards

"Clearly a show for the ages…it calls for an actor who can bring nuance to bear, and this Fred Barton does wonderfully well. His Miss Gulch Returns score is full of sophisticated comedy numbers that would make Cole Porter proud. The lyrics are so cleverly constructed, the rhyme schemes so elegantly intricate, and the messages so rich and ripe, they make a mockery of most of today's Broadway show scores." – Barbara & Scott Siegel, Theatermania
