= The Paul Lynde Halloween Special =

- DVD Cover
- Written by: Bruce Vilanch; Ronny Graham; Ron Pearlman; Biff Manard; Howard Albrecht & Sol Weinstein
- Directed by: Sidney Smith
- Starring: Paul Lynde; Margaret Hamilton; Billie Hayes; Billy Barty; Tim Conway; Roz "Pinky Tuscadero" Kelly; Florence Henderson; Betty White; Kiss; Donny Osmond; Marie Osmond
- Country of origin: United States

Production
- Executive producers: Raymond Katz; Sandy Gallin
- Producers: Bob Booker; George Forster; Joe Byrne
- Running time: 51 minutes
- Production company: Hoysyl Productions

Original release
- Network: ABC
- Release: October 29, 1976

The Paul Lynde Halloween Special is a Halloween-themed variety television special starring Paul Lynde broadcast October 29, 1976, on ABC. It featured guest star Margaret Hamilton in a reprise of her role as the Wicked Witch of the West from The Wizard of Oz. Guest stars include Billie Hayes as Witchiepoo from H.R. Pufnstuf, Tim Conway, Roz Kelly, Florence Henderson, rock band Kiss, Billy Barty as Gallows the Butler, Betty White and, in an unbilled cameo appearance, Donny and Marie Osmond.

== Overview ==
In succession, Paul (as himself) begins singing to celebrate Christmas, Easter and Valentine's Day but is interrupted each time when his housekeeper Margaret (Margaret Hamilton) tells him it is none of these and prods him into admitting it is a holiday he dreads, Halloween. The opening credits roll, and Lynde gives a stand-up monologue explaining, among other jokes, that his childhood obesity had traumatized him into hating the holiday. In keeping with a promise to Margaret to enjoy the holiday, he sings a special version of his signature song "Kids" in which he actually claims to like them until a group of kids in devil costumes (among them Donny and Marie Osmond) torment him.

Margaret offers to take Paul away from the kids and drives him to Gloomsbury Manor, where her sister (Billie Hayes) resides. When they arrive, Paul realizes that both are witches, Wilhelmina Witchiepoo and the Wicked Witch of the West. A third witch, "good witch" Miss Halloween (Betty White) arrives, disappointed that Margaret had brought Lynde instead of the promised Paul Newman (or, for that matter, any other person named Paul), then departs. Believing that they have been unjustly given a bad reputation, they commission Paul to serve as a public relations expert to improve their image. To seal the deal, they offer him three wishes.

In his first wish, Paul wishes to be a trucker and is reinvented as "Big Red," a crass, red-haired, CB-slang-talking, rhinestone-studded trucker engaged to waitress "Kinky Pinky" Tuscadero (Roz Kelly). He soon finds that Pinky has two-timed him and has also promised another trucker (Tim Conway) her hand in marriage; the two, along with Pinky's boss (Billy Barty), soon enter a battle to prove their worth to her, which Big Red wins with his large wad of money from a movie advance, Deep Truck. Big Red and Pinky marry as the diner turns into a raucous hoedown.

He returns to the manor, and after Kiss performs "Detroit Rock City" and Paul and the witches sit through a boring game of Monopoly, Paul offhandedly wishes he were in the Sahara Desert and is transformed into a "chic sheik" lusting after snow queen Lady Cecily Westinghouse (Florence Henderson). After a difficult seduction, just as he wins her over with a cockatoo, his nemesis Seymour of the foreign legion (Conway) reveals the lady was bait for a trap and takes the sheik away. He trades the cockatoo for his freedom and comes back to her, a deal Seymour accepted because "a man gets mighty lonely in the foreign legion."

Pleased with his two wishes, he offers his third wish to the witches, who wish to go to a disco. With Paul as host and Henderson as guest performer ("That Old Black Magic"), the manor turns into a swinging discotheque. Kiss returns and performs two more songs, "Beth" (Peter Criss solo at the piano) and "King of the Night Time World." The show's finale has the entire cast assembling as Paul and Pinky sing Johnnie Taylor's "Disco Lady" (gender-neutralized to "Disco Baby"). Paul thanks the audience and home viewers "for making (him) feel wanted" and implies that he might not appear in another special for a prolonged period of time, before reprising "Disco Baby" with the cast as a perplexed Kiss looks on from the rear.

== Cast ==
- Paul Lynde as himself/Big Red/The Sheik
- Margaret Hamilton as Margaret the housekeeper/Wicked Witch of the West
- Billie Hayes as Wilhelmina Witchiepoo
- Billy Barty as Gallows the butler/Pinky's boss
- Tim Conway as Dynamite Dan/Mr. Longhaul/Seymour of the foreign legion
- Roz Kelly as Pinky Tuscadero
- Betty White as Miss Halloween
- Florence Henderson as herself/Lady Cecily Westinghouse
- Kiss as themselves
- Donny Osmond as kid tormentor
- Marie Osmond as kid tormentor
- Biff Manard (uncredited) as the marriage officiant

== Background ==
Paul Lynde had signed a major contract with ABC. Two sitcoms framed as star vehicles for Lynde, The Paul Lynde Show and Temperatures Rising, had failed. To fulfill the contract and appease Lynde's desire to be a leading actor, he was given a line of irregularly scheduled comedy specials, The Paul Lynde Comedy Hour; ABC President Fred Silverman concluded that "there was something witchy about Lynde" and decided to make him the centerpiece of a Halloween special about witches. Head writer Bruce Vilanch recalled in 2016 that he felt Lynde's style of humor was too grating to carry a lead role and hired a large ensemble cast to spread out the humor.

In the special, Paul Lynde is taken to Margaret Hamilton's sister's house and a photo of a scary castle is shown with ominous music for comedic effect. The image used was of Bunratty Castle, in County Clare Ireland, as the home of Witchiepoo. The castle was renamed 'Gloomsbury Castle' for comedic purpose but not actually filmed there.

Hamilton was effusive in her praise for Hayes, who was an old friend of Lynde's; Hamilton once told Marty Krofft that "Hayes was the best witch ever."

The Krofft connection

While Sid and Marty Krofft had no direct involvement in the special, much of the cast had previously appeared in Krofft productions: Billie Hayes (H.R. Pufnstuf, Pufnstuf, Lidsville), Margaret Hamilton (Sigmund and the Sea Monsters), Billy Barty (The Bugaloos, Sigmund and the Sea Monsters, Dr. Shrinker), Florence Henderson (The Brady Bunch Hour), and Donny and Marie Osmond (the Donny & Marie show, where Lynde was a recurring guest at the time). Use of the Witchiepoo character, attributed to the Kroffts, was acknowledged in a voiceover during the closing credits. Overlap with crew members include editor William Breshears, who edited a number of different Krofft shows.

== Reception ==
Christopher Muther of The Boston Globe, in a 2021 retrospective review, described the special as the most "fabulous train wreck of a holiday spectacular ever filmed," "a vision of horror" and a "phantasmagoric, polyester-clad, rhinestone-studded time capsule of bad jokes and disco medleys with a nonsensical storyline(.)" Lynde's singing, dancing and wardrobe and Vilanch's writing were singled out for their poor quality, but the review noted that Lynde's sincerity made the special likable camp and an enjoyable kind of bad instead of an unwatchable mess.

A 2009 review at The Bootleg Files, a running column on Film Threat, described the special as "so bizarre and over-the-top in its acid-camp that it is almost impossible to believe anything of its kind could ever be shown on TV(.)" The review praised Lynde as the "queen from hell" and the program's "saving grace," with author Phil Hall expressing surprise that the special—aimed at family audiences—drew no complaints from Christian conservatives despite Lynde's thinly veiled homosexuality and references to Deep Throat, among other innuendo. Hall also noted that having a homosexual lead in a prime time show was well ahead of its time, as gay characters would become commonplace in 21st century television.

== Home media and reruns ==
The show has been bootlegged over the years in Kiss fan circles. On October 31, 2006, some of the show's footage was released on Kiss's Kissology Volume One: 1974–1977. The DVD shows a clip of Paul Lynde meeting Kiss and the band's performance of "King of the Night Time World."

The program was released on Region 1 DVD in the United States on October 2, 2007, with bonus features. This followed a two-year process by producer/head writer Bob Booker to clear the rights after finding the original footage of the show, which had long been thought lost.

Independent station WBXZ-LD in Buffalo, New York, had an annual tradition of rerunning the program each Halloween.

== See also ==
- Episode 847
