= The Hungry Tiger of Oz =

1926 book by Ruth Plumly Thompson

- Cover of 1st Edition (US)
- Author: Ruth Plumly Thompson
- Illustrator: John R. Neill
- Language: English
- Series: The Oz books
- Genre: Children's novel
- Publisher: Reilly & Lee
- Publication date: July 1, 1926
- Publication place: United States
- Media type: Print (hardcover)
- Pages: 261
- Preceded by: The Lost King of Oz
- Followed by: The Gnome King of Oz

The Hungry Tiger of Oz (1926) is the twentieth book in the Oz series created by L. Frank Baum and his successors, and the sixth written by Ruth Plumly Thompson. It was illustrated by John R. Neill. The novel was followed by The Gnome King of Oz (1927).

== Plot summary ==
Thompson begins with a usurping tyrant, Irasha the Rough, the Pasha of Rash, a tiny kingdom in the southwest of Ev. The Pasha has a problem: his prison is too full to cram any more Rashers in. His Vizier's solution is to obtain a ferocious animal from nearby Oz to devour the luckless prisoners. Travelling to the Emerald City by his magical "hurry cane", the Vizier lures the Hungry Tiger (first seen in Ozma of Oz) to Rash. As might be expected from his history, however, the Hungry Tiger is too tenderhearted to eat prisoners.

Meanwhile, through an unfortunate series of events involving a winding road and a pair of Quick Sandals, Betsy Bobbin (introduced in Tik-Tok of Oz) and her new acquaintance, Carter Green, the Vegetable Man, end up in Rash, and no sooner do they arrive than they're thrown into the crowded prison. There they meet the Scarlet Prince Evered (known as Reddy), the rightful ruler of Rash. Together with the Tiger, they escape, and have varied adventures with Big Wigs and Gnomes in their search for three magic rubies.

Back in Oz, Princess Ozma has troubles of her own: she is confronted by Atmos Fere, a balloon-like being who lives in the upper stratosphere. His plan is to kidnap her up to his own kingdom, to prove to his skeptical fellows that living beings can exist on the surface of the Earth. Ozma, however, has a secret weapon (a pin).

In time, the adventurers recover the magic rubies, and Reddy is restored to the Rashian throne. The Pasha and his evil Vizier end up stranded on a desert island in the Nonestic Ocean.

== Promotion ==
Publisher Reilly & Lee mounted an imaginative promotional campaign for the book. The company returned to the tactic of issuing press releases in the form of the Ozmapolitan, the supposed newspaper of the Emerald City. They also formed a fan-club for children called the Ozmite Club — though it lasted for only two years.

The Oz books
Previous book: The Lost King of Oz	The Hungry Tiger of Oz; 1926	Next book: The Gnome King of Oz
