= Kabumpo in Oz =

Book by Ruth Plumly Thompson

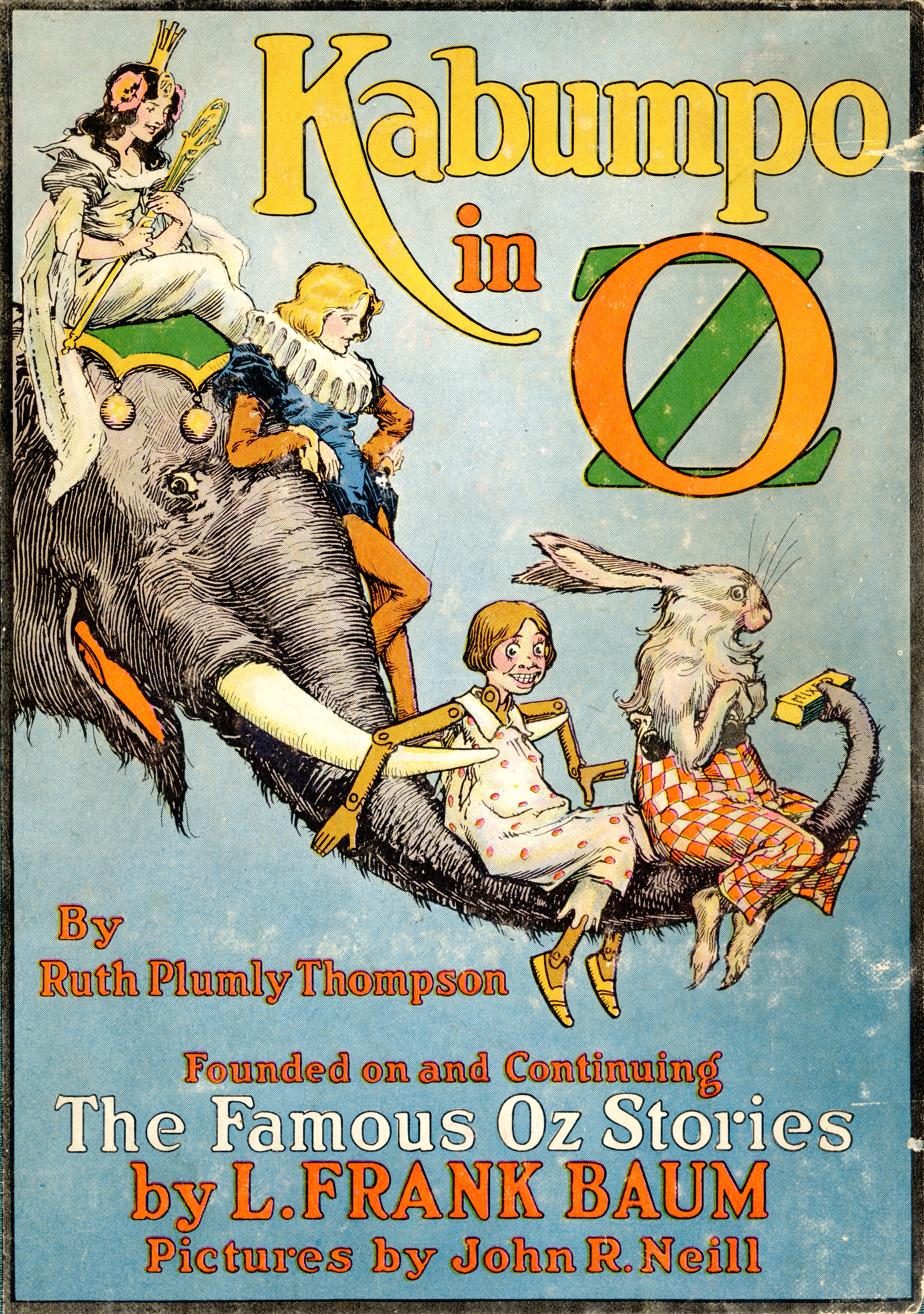
- Cover of Kabumpo in Oz
- Author: Ruth Plumly Thompson
- Illustrator: John R. Neill
- Language: English
- Series: The Oz books
- Genre: Children's novel
- Publisher: Reilly & Lee
- Publication date: May 1, 1922
- Publication place: United States
- Media type: Print (Hardcover)
- Pages: 297
- Preceded by: The Royal Book of Oz
- Followed by: The Cowardly Lion of Oz

Kabumpo in Oz (1922) is the sixteenth book in the Oz series, and the second written by Ruth Plumly Thompson. It was the first Oz book fully credited to her. (Her first, The Royal Book of Oz, was credited to L. Frank Baum on the cover.) It was followed by The Cowardly Lion of Oz (1923).

== Plot summary ==
During Prince Pompadore of Pumperdink's eighteenth birthday celebration, his birthday cake explodes, revealing a magic scroll, a magic mirror, and a doorknob. The scroll warns the prince that if he doesn't wed a "proper princess" within seven days, his entire kingdom will disappear. The prince, along with the kingdom's wise elephant Kabumpo, set off on an adventure to the Emerald City so Pompa can marry Princess Ozma, the only "proper princess" the Elegant Elephant can think of as worthy of his prince.

Meanwhile, Ruggedo the Gnome King (Thompson "corrected" Baum's spelling of "Nome") finds Glegg's Box of Mixed Magic while tunnelling under the Emerald City. He experiments with the magical items inside the box; after he brings a wooden doll, Peg Amy, to life, and makes Wag the rabbit the size of a man, Ruggedo turns himself into a giant. This means that Ozma's palace gets stuck on his head, and in a panic he runs off to Ev with it.

After many adventures in the strange lands of Rith Metic, the Illumi Nation, and the Soup Sea, Pompadore and Kabumpo arrive in the Emerald City to find Ozma missing. They set off to find her and eventually meet up with Wag and Peg Amy. The group reaches the edge of the Deadly Desert and is hijacked by the Runaway Country, a conscious, talking, mobile piece of land. It carries them over the desert to Ev.

Eventually, Peg Amy is revealed to be the princess of Sun Top Mountain (she was turned into a tree by the evil magician J. Glegg when she refused to marry him, then Cap'n Bill took part of the tree and carved her into a wooden doll for Trot), regains her original human form, and Pompadore marries her.

== Reception ==
The Charlotte Observer declared, "It is a case of 'The king is dead, long live the queen," for Kabumpo proves beyond any question that Miss Thompson will carry on the fame of Oz created by Frank Baum, and such a fact will become a cause of rejoicing wherever good children are to be found." The Minneapolis Star Tribune agreed, "There is throughout Kabumpo in Oz a wonderful quality of imagination, a drama of high adventure that leaves not a single dull moment, combined with a charming sense of humor slightly tinged with satire that brings it into the class of master fairy books."

In L. Frank Baum: Creator of Oz, Katharine M. Rogers declares that Kabumpo in Oz is "one of [Thompson's] best."

The Oz books
Previous book: The Royal Book of Oz	Kabumpo in Oz; 1922	Next book: The Cowardly Lion of Oz
