= Robert Myhrum =

Robert Myhrum (1927–1999) was an American TV and film director.

== Early life and education ==
Myhrum was born in Chicago, Illinois. He graduated from Lake Forest Academy; and subsequently received his A.B. from Harvard University, and his M.F.A. from Yale University.

== Career ==
In 1973 Myhrum was nominated for Primetime Emmy Award for his work on Sesame Street, a show which he worked on for 13 years.

Besides his children's TV work on Captain Kangaroo and Sesame Street, Myhrum directed soap operas, including The Doctors, Love of Life, The Secret Storm, Ryan's Hope, Days of Our Lives and As the World Turns.

When he retired from television, Myhrum worked in local theater in Vermont and Florida, and served as an adviser on television for the National Endowment of the Arts.
