= Wicked Witch of the West =

Character from The Wonderful Wizard of Oz

- Oz character
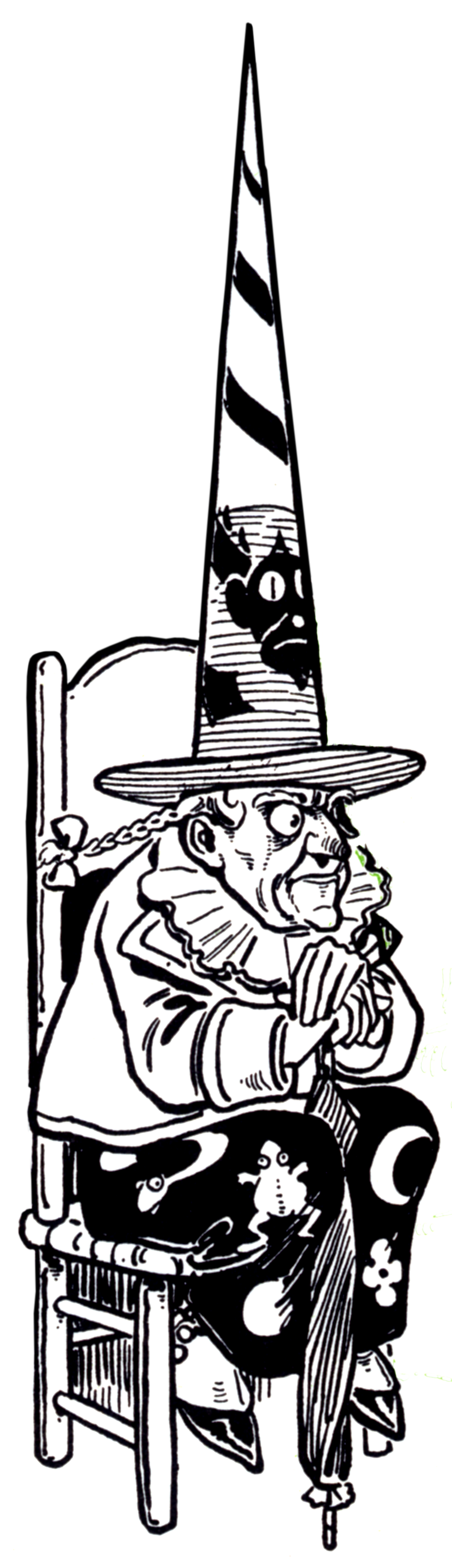
- The Wicked Witch of the West (illustration by W. W. Denslow, 1900)
- First appearance: The Wonderful Wizard of Oz (1900)
- Created by: L. Frank Baum

In-universe information
- Aliases: Momba (1910) (The Wonderful Wizard of Oz (1910 film)); Bastinda (1939) (The Wizard of the Emerald City); Wicked West (1961) (Tales of the Wizard of Oz); Evillene (1974) (The Wiz); Elphaba Thropp (1995) (Wicked); Old Snarl-Spats (2000) (The Unknown Witches of Oz); Mordra (2005) (The Living House of Oz); Chester (2007) (The Wonderful Wizard of Ha's); Azkadellia (2007) (Tin Man); Billie Westbrook (2011) (Dorothy and the Witches of Oz); Lynessa (2013) (Grimm Fairy Tales presents Oz); Theodora (2013) (Oz the Great and Powerful); Zelena (2014) (Once Upon a Time); Pyrena (2017) (The Wicked Wizard of Oz); Mistress West (2017) (Emerald City); Langwidere (2017) (Lost in Oz); Morella (2019) (How the Wizard Came to Oz)
- Species: Witch
- Gender: Female
- Title: The Wicked Witch of the West
- Occupation: Ruler of the Winkies (at time of death)
- Family: The Wicked Witch of the East (sister)
- Nationality: Ozian of Winkie descent
- Role: Antagonist

The Wicked Witch of the West is a character in the classic children's novel The Wonderful Wizard of Oz (1900) by the American author L. Frank Baum, who is the evil ruler of the Winkie Country, the western region in the Land of Oz. She is inadvertently killed by the child Dorothy Gale with a bucket of water. In Baum's subsequent Oz novels, the Wicked Witch of the West is referred to occasionally.

Margaret Hamilton played the role of the witch in the classic 1939 film based on Baum's novel. Hamilton's characterization introduced green skin, a feature repeated in later literary and dramatic representations, including Gregory Maguire's 1995 revisionist novel Wicked (as well as the novel's 2003 stage musical adaptation and subsequent two-part film adaptation), the 2013 film Oz the Great and Powerful, and the television series Once Upon a Time.

== In Baum's books ==
The Wicked Witch of the West is the malevolent ruler of the Winkie Country. Her castle is described as beautiful instead of being the sinister fortress shown in the 1939 film. In all versions, she is aquaphobic. The Wicked Witch of the West was not related to the Wicked Witch of the East, but leagued together with her, the Wicked Witch of the South, and the Wicked Witch of the North to conquer the Land of Oz and divide it amongst themselves, as recounted in L. Frank Baum's Dorothy and the Wizard in Oz. She shows no interest in the death of the Eastern Witch and all she cares about is obtaining the Silver Shoes which will increase her power. W. W. Denslow's illustrations for The Wonderful Wizard of Oz depict her as a paunched old hag with three pigtails and an eyepatch. Baum himself specified that she only had one eye, but that it "was as powerful as a telescope", enabling the witch to see what was happening in her kingdom from her castle windows. Other illustrators, such as Paul Granger, placed her eye in the center of her forehead, as a cyclops. Usually, she is shown wearing an eyepatch; however, some illustrations show her with two eyes.

Most of her power resides in the creatures she controls. She has a pack of 40 great wolves, a flock of 40 crows, a swarm of black bees, and an army of Winkies. She possesses the enchanted Golden Cap, which compels the winged monkeys to obey her on three occasions. First, the witch commanded the creatures to help her enslave the Winkies and to seize control of the western part of the Land of Oz. Second, she made the winged monkeys drive the Wizard of Oz's army out of the Winkie Country, when he attempted to overthrow her.

When Dorothy Gale and her companions Scarecrow, Tin Woodman, and Cowardly Lion were sent by the Wizard to destroy her, the Witch attacked them with her various creatures. Each of these attempts was thwarted with the Tin Woodman killing the 40 great wolves, Scarecrow killing the 40 crows, the black bees dying upon trying to sting the Tin Woodman, and the armed Winkie slaves being scared off by the Cowardly Lion. The protagonists are eventually subdued by the Witch's third and final permitted use of the winged monkeys. Nevertheless, the old witch cannot kill Dorothy because the girl is protected by the Good Witch of the North's kiss. She settles for enslaving Dorothy and tries to force the Cowardly Lion into submission by starving him, though Dorothy sneaks him food. Upon seeing the Silver Shoes on the girl's feet, the Wicked Witch decides to steal them, and thereby acquire even more power.

When she succeeds in acquiring one silver shoe by making Dorothy trip over an invisible bar, the little girl angrily throws a bucket of water onto the Wicked Witch. This causes the old witch to melt away. The Wicked Witch's dryness was enumerated in some clues before this. Furthermore, when Toto had bitten her, she had not bled; her wickedness had dried her up long ago. L. Frank Baum did not explain precisely why water had this effect on her, nor did he ever imply that all evil witches could be likewise destroyed. However, the wicked witch Mombi is similarly disposed of in The Lost King of Oz and the wicked witch Singra is clearly afraid of the same fate in the early chapters of The Wicked Witch of Oz.

== Personality and characterization ==
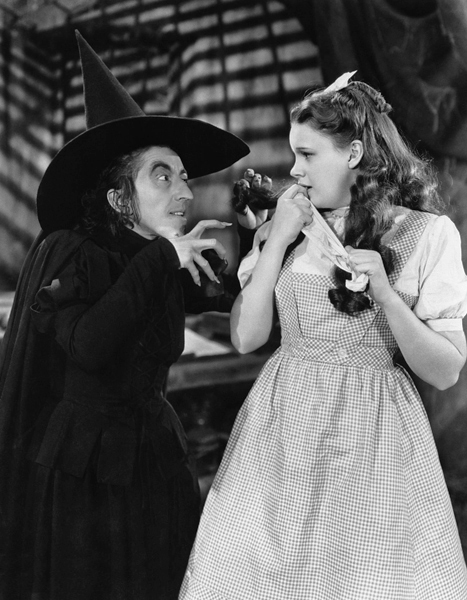
Margaret Hamilton as the Wicked Witch of the West (left) and Judy Garland as Dorothy Gale (right)

In the 1939 film, the Witch is iconic for her green skin, pointed hat, broom, boisterous, dramatic (yet nasty) personality, and cackle; in the books, her personality is somewhat more subtle: she is not as overtly sadistic, she is not as antagonistic to Dorothy and only becomes so once she sees Dorothy has intruded on her land, and her appearance is described very differently. In the novel, she also does not carry a broom, but rather an umbrella, which she uses on one occasion to strike Dorothy's dog Toto. Her nature is a volatile and yet somewhat cowardly one when compared to the film version. Despite her immense power, she avoids face-to-face contact with her enemies, and is frightened of Dorothy at first when she sees the girl wearing the Silver Shoes. She is also afraid of the dark in Baum's original story for reasons unknown. For that reason, the Witch never tried to steal the Silver Shoes while Dorothy was sleeping. Despite her fear of water and the dark, the Wicked Witch of the West was one of the most powerful witches in all of Oz. In ensuing Oz books, her power is described as having been so great that even Glinda the Good Witch of the South feared her. She was described as being so cruel that the blood in her body dried up and that when she was struck, she did not bleed. In the novel, she also owns slaves to do her bidding, a characterization which is kept in "The Wiz", in which she is much more dramatic than in the original film and forces her slaves to refer to her as beautiful.

== In other books ==
- In Alexander Melentyevich Volkov's 1939 novel The Wizard of the Emerald City, her given name is Bastinda. March Laumer uses this name for the witch in his novel Aunt Em and Uncle Henry in Oz. As in the 1939 movie, she is the sister of the Wicked Witch of the East. Sherwood Smith uses this name for a new Wicked Witch of the West in her 2005 book The Emerald Wand of Oz.
- Gregory Maguire's 1995 revisionist novel Wicked takes the familiar Oz story and inverts it, with the Wicked Witch (given the name Elphaba in homage to L. Frank Baum) as the novel's protagonist and Dorothy as a hapless child. The name is retained in the musical Wicked.
- In the novel The Unknown Witches of Oz, the Wicked Witch of the West is named Old Snarl-Spats.
- In Dorothy of Oz, the Wicked Witch of the West's ghost appeared. When Princess Gaylette's Jester gets his hand on the Wicked Witch of the West's wand, he gets possessed by the Wicked Witch of the West's ghost. When Dorothy starts to do a trick to fool the Jester that Glinda is in china doll form, the Wicked Witch of the West's ghost continues to warn the Jester of Dorothy's trick. When the Jester gives the Wicked Witch of the West's wand to Dorothy, the Wicked Witch of the West's ghost disappears. It was also mentioned in this story that Wicked Witch of the West once cast a curse on the Gillikin Country town of Purplefield where it was turned into a maze that causes anyone who fails to make it through to disappear. Her curse on Purplefield was undone when Dorothy, Scarecrow, Tin Man, and Cowardly Lion made it through the maze by hearing Tugg's foghorn.
- In Cheshire Crossing after reforming years after being melted by Dorothy, the Wicked Witch of the West, also known as Miss West, confronts her alongside Alice Liddell and Wendy Darling, becoming allied and romantically involved with Captain James Hook.
- In the graphic novel adaptation of How the Wizard Came to Oz, the Wicked Witch of the West is named Morella.

== In dramatic representations ==
=== 1910 film ===
The 1910 silent film The Wonderful Wizard of Oz features a character similar to the Wicked Witch of the West, identified in intertitles as "Momba the Witch" (Compare the character Mombi from The Marvelous Land of Oz). In the film, Momba has an unspecified hold over the Wizard, who promises his crown to anyone who can release him from Momba's power. Momba captures Dorothy and her companions, evoking the events in Baum's original novel, and is destroyed when Dorothy throws a bucket of water over her.

=== 1914 film ===
Mombi's likeness and costume in the 1914 silent film, His Majesty, the Scarecrow of Oz is based on Denslow's illustrations of the Wicked Witch of the West.

=== 1939 film ===
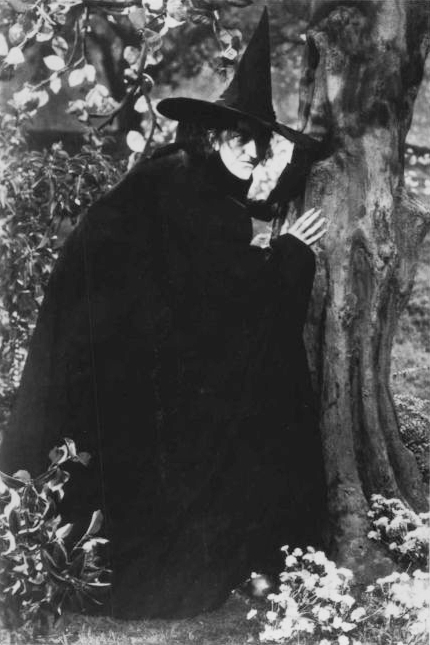
Margaret Hamilton as the Wicked Witch of the West in The Wizard of Oz (1939).

In the 1939 version of The Wizard of Oz, Margaret Hamilton plays the Wicked Witch of the West as a green-skinned witch dressed in a long black dress with a black pointed hat. This representation of the Wicked Witch has become a standard for what witches resemble and an archetype of human wickedness. While the relationship is not mentioned in Baum's books, in the movie the Witch is the sister of the Wicked Witch of the East. The movie makes her even more of a primary antagonist, and consequently, she appears in the film much earlier (and more often), than in Baum's original novel. She is described by Glinda, the Good Witch of the North (not the South as in the book), as "worse than the other one". She actively seeks revenge against Dorothy for killing her sister, even though it was "accidental". However, as soon as the Witch is reminded of the ruby slippers, all interest in her sister's death vanishes and all she cares about is obtaining her slippers, which will enable her to conquer Oz. She is more menacing than her literary counterpart, making Dorothy too afraid to ever lose her temper with the Witch. She makes sure that Dorothy knows her power when Dorothy meets the Scarecrow by throwing a ball of fire at them. Before Dorothy and her friends get to the city, the Witch casts a sleeping spell over a field of poppies through which the group must pass. Glinda remotely counteracts the spell with snowfall. The Wicked Witch then flies on her broom over the Emerald City, demanding that the citizens of the Emerald City Surrender Dorothy to her, and the Wizard demands the destruction of the Witch, with her broom as proof, in exchange for granting the wishes of Dorothy and her companions. Unlike Baum's original depiction, the Wicked Witch sends the Winged Monkeys as the first wave of attack. She is killed when Dorothy throws a bucket of water on her, in attempt to put out a fire the witch bestowed on the Scarecrow. In the novel, Dorothy simply throws it on her in a fit of anger. There is no prior mention of the Wicked Witch's vulnerability to water in the movie, save for a split-second before the water actually douses her when she screams "Don't throw that water!" (this line does not appear in the film's shooting script). After the Wicked Witch of the West is dead, her soldiers are glad to be free of her power, and quote "Hail to Dorothy! The Wicked Witch is dead!" The character ranks No. 4 in the American Film Institute's list of the 50 Best Movie Villains of All Time alongside Darth Vader, Norman Bates, and Hannibal Lecter, making her the highest ranking female villain, as well as placing 90th on Empire magazine's 100 Greatest Movie Characters of All Time.

Hamilton's other role in this film is the Witch's Kansas sepia tone counterpart, Miss Almira Gulch, created for the film by screenwriter Noel Langley. Gulch is a socialite who owns half the county, seeking to have Dorothy's dog Toto taken to the sheriff and destroyed after being bitten. This prompts Dorothy to call her "a wicked old witch". Miss Gulch takes Toto away in her basket, but he escapes. In the tornado scene, Dorothy sees Miss Gulch on her bicycle transform into a Wicked Witch flying on a broom.

Gale Sondergaard was originally cast as the Wicked Witch of the West, but withdrew from the role when the witch's persona shifted from sly and glamorous (thought to emulate the Evil Queen in Disney's Snow White and the Seven Dwarfs) to the familiar "ugly hag".

==== Hamilton's other appearances ====
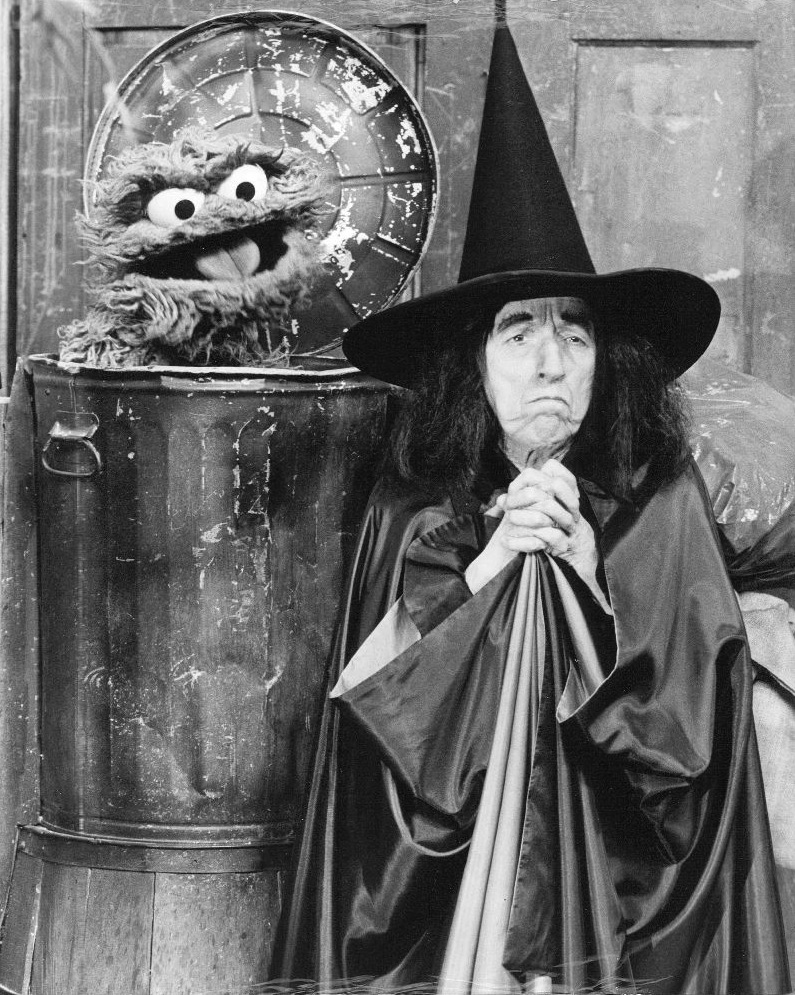
Margaret Hamilton and Oscar the Grouch in 1976

On a 1976 episode of the American children's TV show Sesame Street, the Witch, once again played by Hamilton, drops her broom and falls onto the street. Big Bird and a Sesame Street resident, David, have the broom and refuse to give it back because of her nasty and disrespectful attitude (Oscar the Grouch is the only Sesame Street resident who finds her pleasant; he even develops a crush on her). Enraged, the Wicked Witch threatens to turn them into a feather duster and a basketball, respectively, unless they comply with her wishes; she also makes it rain inside of Mr. Hooper's store as an intimidation tactic. Realizing that threats and intimidation have failed to yield the desired result, she resorts to trickery, disguising herself as a sweet old lady in an effort to steal the broom back. David turns the tables on her by willingly giving it back after talking her into asking for it politely and with respect. Unfortunately, she does not learn the lesson about being nice and heads home on discourteous terms with the locals (except, perhaps, for Big Bird, who says he will miss her because the events of the episode were an exciting change). The Wicked Witch accidentally drops the broom again while showing off on her flight home, and David, again in possession of it, laments his prediction that the whole ordeal will now repeat itself.

This episode received a very negative reception. After it was aired, the Children's Television Workshop (CTW) and series creators Joan Ganz Cooney and Lloyd Morrisett received numerous letters from parents, who complained that the Wicked Witch was too scary for their children, using phrases such as "screams and tears" and "the threat of the witch's power remains in children's eyes." As a result of these complaints, Anna Herera, of the CTW Research Department, told the creators of Sesame Street to not re-air the episode. The episode was considered lost but was leaked anonymously on June 18, 2022.

The Museum of the Moving Image in New York City screened part of the Wicked Witch episode on November 24, 2019, as part of a "Lost and Found" event that celebrated the 50th anniversary of Sesame Street. It was accompanied by many other clips, including the unaired episode "Snuffy's Parents Get a Divorce", along with a discussion panel with Jim Henson Legacy president Craig Shemin, former Sesame Street head writer Norman Stiles, and Sesame Workshop's Rosemarie Truglio.

Hamilton also played the Wicked Witch of the West in The Paul Lynde Halloween Special (1976), and reprised her role several times on stage, most notably at the St. Louis Municipal Opera.

Hamilton also appeared as herself on Mister Rogers' Neighborhood three times between 1975 and 1976. In these appearances, she demonstrated how her costume and acting skills made her appear to be the Witch, and assured her young viewers that there was nothing about her to be feared, because her portrayal in the film was only make-believe.

=== Wicked ===
The story line of the stage adaptation "goes far afield" from the 1995 novel. As Winnie Holzman observed in an interview with Playbill, "It was [Maguire's] brilliant idea to take this hated figure and tell things from her point of view, and to have the two witches be roommates in college, but the way in which their friendship develops – and really the whole plot – is different onstage." Schwartz justified the deviation, saying "Primarily we were interested in the relationship between Galinda – who becomes Glinda – and Elphaba...the friendship of these two women and how their characters lead them to completely different destinies." In addition to this change in focus, other major plot modifications include Fiyero's appearance as the scarecrow, Elphaba's survival at the end, Nessarose using a wheelchair instead of being born without arms, Boq having a continuing love interest for Glinda – and eventually becoming the Tin Woodman instead of Nick Chopper, the complete cutting of Elphaba's years in the Vinkus, the deletion of Liir's birth, Fiyero not having a wife and children, and Doctor Dillamond not being murdered.

=== Oz the Great and Powerful ===
Mila Kunis as Theodora in Oz the Great and Powerful

Mila Kunis portrays the Wicked Witch of the West, who is named Theodora, in the 2013 film Oz the Great and Powerful. In this version, she is portrayed as a 'good witch' and as the younger sister of Evanora (Rachel Weisz), who is at war with Glinda (Michelle Williams) for control of Oz; Theodora wants nothing more than for peace to come back to their land. She falls in love with Oscar Diggs (James Franco), but her feelings for him are one-sided; Theodora wants to be Oscar's queen when he rules Oz. After Oscar goes to meet with Glinda, Evanora convinces Theodora that Oscar had betrayed her, offering her a magic apple that will help Theodora forget her disappointment. Theodora immediately takes a bite from it, but she realizes too late that Evanora had deceived her. Before Theodora can do anything, she starts feeling great pain and delirium as the apple, tainted with dark magic, causes her heart to wither and her skin to turn green. Though Evanora offers to cover up Theodora's new appearance with an enchantment, Theodora embraces her new appearance and helps her sister attempt to kill Glinda, get revenge on Oscar, and take control of Oz. However, she and Evanora are defeated by Oscar's illusions. Theodora is forced to flee the city on her broom, but she threatens to return. Oscar tells her he knows her wickedness is not her doing and, if she ever finds the goodness within her, she is welcome to return. However, she refuses and flies off to the West, vowing revenge.

=== Once Upon a Time ===
The Wicked Witch appears as the main antagonist of the second half of the third season of Once Upon a Time, played by Rebecca Mader; the character also appears in subsequent seasons. This version goes by the name of Zelena (which means "green" in some Slavic languages), the daughter of Cora, the Queen of Hearts (Barbara Hershey/Rose McGowan) and older half-sister of Regina Mills, the Evil Queen (Lana Parrilla). Abandoned by Cora and raised in Oz, Zelena learned how to control her own powerful magic with the help of Rumplestiltskin (Robert Carlyle). Wishing for familial love and growing increasingly jealous of Regina's success at infiltrating the royal family, Zelena works to collect ingredients to create a time-travel spell to create a more favorable trajectory for her life. She is eventually stopped by Emma Swan as well as Regina's new mastery of light magic in time to oppose her, before seemingly killed by Rumplestiltskin.

It was later discovered that Zelena's soul successfully went back in time, where she revived herself and assumed the identity of Maid Marian (Christie Laing), who is rescued and brought back to the present. She becomes pregnant by Robin Hood (Sean Maguire), primarily to make Regina suffer (Regina and Robin had started a relationship before the perceived survival of Maid Marian). After Emma becomes the Dark One, she speeds up Zelena's pregnancy so she can have an unhampered ally. However, Zelena begins to bond with her new daughter, though after Emma is cured, Zelena is sent back to Oz, while Regina and the others assume custody of the child.

On Zelena's return to Oz, she confronts Dorothy, stealing her silver slippers to travel back to her daughter in Storybrooke. By this point, the heroes had traveled to the Underworld to deal with Hades, one of Zelena's former lovers. Zelena, trying to change for her daughter, begins to repair her relationship with Regina, though she still shares True Love's Kiss with Hades. However, Hades kills Robin Hood with the Olympian Crystal, and Zelena makes her choice to fight for good, killing Hades with the same weapon, and naming her daughter Robin after her father.

=== Guardians of Oz ===
In the Mexican animated feature Guardians of Oz, Glinda revives the Wicked Witch while removing her powers, storing them in a magic broom. Nonetheless, the Witch, here named Evilene, conducts an evil pursuit to get her powers back.

=== Emerald City ===
The Witch of the West, known as Mistress West, appears as one of the main characters in the television series Emerald City, portrayed by Ana Ularu. Here she is one of the last Cardinal Witches of Oz and the "Mistress of the Western Fields, Vessel of Truth and Solace", along with her sisters, Glinda of the North and the Witch of the East. West seemingly obeys the Wizard of Oz's law against magic, owns a brothel in the Emerald City and is a poppy opium addict, deteriorating her magical skill. She is very emotional, especially when compared to the reserved behavior of Glinda. Despite claiming to hate magic because it could not save her mother and sister witches during the Beast Forever's last attack, she resorts to it quickly when in pursuit of Dorothy after she accidentally killed East.

=== Minor roles in other adaptations ===
- In The Wiz (1974), its film version (1978), and television special (2015), the Wicked Witch of the West is given the name Evillene (portrayed by Mabel King in both the original Broadway cast and the film, and Mary J. Blige in the television special). She is the malevolent ruler of the Winkies. She is the sister of Addaperle (Miss One in the film version), Glinda, and Evermean, the other three witches of Oz. In the film version, she runs a sweatshop under Yankee Stadium with the slogan "Manufacturers and Exporters of Sweat" and extracts it not only from the Winkies, but the Crows, the Poppy Girls, and the Subway Peddler. Her magic creates urban variations on the Kalidahs (depicted as evil growing dolls sent by the Subway Peddler), Fighting Trees (depicted as mobile pillars) and the wolves (depicted as living and carnivorous trash cans), all in the Subway system. She then sends the Flying Monkeys (depicted as a biker gang) to capture Dorothy and her friends. In the film, Evillene is vanquished when Dorothy sets off the sweatshop's sprinkler system, thus ending her reign over the Winkies.
- In Scooby-Doo and Scrappy-Doo's 1981 episode "Scooby's Trip to Ahz", the Witch appears as the Wicked Witch of the North by Southeast.
- In the anime film The Wizard of Oz (1982), the Witch (voiced by Elizabeth Hanna) is purple-skinned, white-haired, and wears an eyepatch similar to W. W. Denslow's original illustration. However, her telescopic eye is replaced by a magic mirror. Her soldiers are completely magical, disappear at her demise, and are quite distinct from the Winkies, whom she uses only for labor. She wears an old-fashioned peasant dress and possesses a staff, through which she generates her magic.
- In the 1988 Polish cutout cartoon series W krainie czarnoksiężnika Oza (In the Land of the Wizard of Oz), which adapts The Wonderful Wizard of Oz and The Marvelous Land of Oz, Wicked Witch of the West and Wicked Witch of the East is combined into one character (voiced by Alina Bukowska) called "Wicked Witch of the East" and she ruled both Munchkin and Winkie Country. She is depicted as a short white-haired hag in the red stereotypical witch dress. In this version name "Wicked Witch of the West" is given to Mombi.
- In the 1986 anime series The Wonderful Wizard of Oz, the Witch is purple-skinned once again, and has long white hair with a blood-like red streak. She possesses both eyes and is dressed in a long, black hooded gown. Her eyes have the power to turn people into stone, and turn blood-red when such transformations are effected. One of the Winkies actually tries to crush her to death with a huge boulder, but the Witch causes the boulder to disappear, and turns the man into stone. Like in the 1982 anime film, a magic mirror shows her everything she wishes to uncover. The Wicked Witch makes it clear to Dorothy that the Good Witch of the North's kiss cannot serve as protection from her apparently superior power, and it's the Silver Shoes that safeguard the girl. The Witch also reveals that the Wicked Witch of the East was her sister, and that the Silver Shoes could triple her own powers. This version gives the witch the most prolonged and dramatic death scene of all versions; it also differs from previous adaptations by suggesting that Mombi was her protégé.
- In the animated series The Wizard of Oz (1990–1991) by DiC Enterprises, the Flying Monkeys that were loyal to the Wicked Witch of the West (voiced by Tress MacNeille) perform a ritual that resurrects the Wicked Witch of the West where they place her hat, dress and cloak on an effigy. Afterwards, she terrorizes Oz again by tarnishing the Emerald City, stealing what Dorothy's friends treasure the most (the Scarecrow's brain diploma, the Tin Woodman's clock heart, and the Cowardly Lion's medal of courage), and making the Wizard fly off-course in his hot-air balloon by creating an evil wind. Of course she still has a weakness to any type of water causing her to evade at all times. This incarnation of the character was clearly based on the 1939 MGM movie, to which the series itself served as an unofficial sequel. Although the witch's garments are purple here rather than black.
- The Witch appears in a little-known, now lost 1995 version of the original story made for British cable television starring Denise Van Outen as Dorothy and featured a cameo appearance by Zoe Salmon of Blue Peter fame. It combined elements of Baum's original story, the 1939 movie, and the 1985 semi-sequel Return to Oz. She first appears after Dorothy lands in Oz, demands to know where the Ruby Slippers are, threatens Dorothy, then leaves. The Munchkins then reveal they hid the Slippers to keep the Witch from getting them, force them onto Dorothy, who then leaves to find the Wizard. At the end of the film, after taking the Slippers while Dorothy is sleeping, the Witch turns her loose in a room full of large rocks, says she's turned Dorothy's companions into rocks themselves, and will give her three chances to pick which ones are her friends, but if she guesses wrong, she will become one herself. To be fair, she turns the Slippers into a rock and hides them in the room. Dorothy, however manages to find the Tin Woodman, Scarecrow and Cowardly Lion. The Witch, enraged, grows to giant sized and holds a boulder over Dorothy, who then finds the Slippers and wishes for the Witch to lose her power. The Witch loses her strength and falls backwards, and the boulder kills her instantly.
- In the 1995 television special The Wizard of Oz in Concert: Dreams Come True (a stage musical based on the 1939 film), Debra Winger portrays the Witch. Her costume is green rather than black. In addition, Winger narrates the tornado scene including Miss Gulch's transformation. This production omits the scene where the Witch threatens Dorothy, the Scarecrow, and Tin Man as mattresses and a beehive after appearing on top of The Tin Man's cottage. The Wicked Witch's Castle scenes are shortened due to time limit. Unlike Margaret Hamilton, Winger says the line "What a little whiner! I'll give you something to cry about" when Dorothy suffers her imprisonment after Aunt Em's image fades away in the crystal ball rather than "I'll give you Auntie Em, my pretty!".
- In the February 1996 episode "Water You Thinking?" of Mighty Morphin' Alien Rangers, a witch monster appears by the name of Witchblade and she seems to be modeled after the Wicked Witch. Her voice and cackle are reminiscent of the 1939 film's portrayal of the Witch. Additionally, most of her lines are paraphrasings of the Witch's lines, such as "How 'bout a little fire, Rangers?". She also refers to the Rangers' Zords as "Tin Men" and to the Rangers as "My pretties". When she's defeated, she cries "Oh, no! I'm falling, falling! What a world!"
- In "Anthology of Interest II", a 2002 episode of the animated television series Futurama, Leela is knocked unconscious and dreams about being Dorothy in a version of The Wizard of Oz, with Futurama characters playing the roles of Wizard characters. While Fry is the Scarecrow, Bender the Robot is the Tinman, and Doctor Zoidberg is the Lion, the Wicked Witch is played by Mom, a recurring antagonist from the show, voice by Tress MacNeille who also provided the voice for The Wicked Witch of the West in the 1990 DIC animated series. The Witch sends her flying monkeys, played by Mom's sons Larry, Walt, and Igner, to capture Dorothy/Leela. At the Witch's castle, she reveals that she wants to adopt Dorothy as her daughter, and Dorothy/Leela agrees, as long as she gets to be a witch, too. The Witch/Mom meets her fate when Tinman/Bender opens a celebratory bottle of champagne and accidentally sprays her with it, melting her. Later, after Dorothy/Leela uses the power of her ruby boots to become the new Wicked Witch of the West, water splashes down on her from the ceiling, causing her to melt as well, to which the Cowardly Lobster/Zoidberg descends the stairs, mentioning "I think there's a problem with your upstairs toilet."
- In The Muppets' Wizard of Oz (2005), Miss Piggy plays all of the witches of Oz, including the Wicked Witch of the West. Her basic attire evoked W. W. Denslow's original illustration, with a biker theme. The eyepatch also covered a magical glass-eye that gave her visual powers. This version of the Wicked Witch is only vulnerable to tap water where she is able to bathe in bottled water. The Wicked Witch of the West is vanquished when Dorothy kicks her into the bathtub filled with bottled tap water since Angel Marie filled the bottles with tap water. Afterwards, Dorothy salvages her glass-eye which is later given to the Wizard of Oz. Miss Piggy's other role is herself. Prior to Dorothy's journey, she appears with Kermit and tries to get rid of Dorothy. After Dorothy's return, she returns for the Muppets' show.
- In the October 2007 VeggieTales episode "The Wonderful Wizard of Ha's", the witch and her Kansas counterpart from the 1939 film are replaced by Bobby the Bully (Kansas) and Chester the Bully (Wonderful Land of Ha's), both portrayed by Gourdon from "Bully Trouble".
- In the December 2007 Syfy miniseries Tin Man, the character of Azkadellia (played by Kathleen Robertson) is analogous with the Wicked Witch of the West, though she is vastly different from most other versions of the character. In the miniseries, she is portrayed as a member of the Royal Family of the O.Z. (Outer Zone) who is possessed as a young girl by the spirit of the evil Witch of the Dark (Karin Konoval) who uses her body to take over the O.Z. and plunge it into a world of permanent darkness. This adaptation's version of Dorothy Gale is Azkadellia's younger sister DG (Zooey Deschanel). Both of the sisters are powerful witches themselves, though DG has to relearn all of her magical abilities, and once DG frees Azkadellia from the witch's grip, both of them defeat her together. Although it is clear that Azkadellia is analogous with the Wicked Witch of the West, it is implied vaguely that the Witch of the Dark is the Wicked Witch that Dorothy, who makes an appearance as a spirit in a mausoleum, defeated in the original story.
- In Dorothy of Oz, a Korean manhwa (produced 2008 or earlier) by Son Hee-Joon, the Witch of the West is re-imagined as a scientist who rules over the Western Dominion and the true orchestrator of the death of the East Witch Selluriah. She is the creator of an army of clones, one of whom is the story's equivalent of the Scarecrow.
- The Wicked Witch of the West appears as the primary antagonist of the 2011 television miniseries Dorothy and the Witches of Oz, played by Eliza Swenson. In flashbacks, it was seen that she had obtained the mystical Book of Bini Aru (which contained the Changing Word) from the Wizard as part of a deal not to continue her attack on Oz in exchange that the Wizard doesn't plan to reclaim the book. Unfortunately for the Wicked Witch of the West, the Wizard entrusted the key to the Book of Bini Aru to Dorothy for safekeeping. On Earth, she assumes the form of a female book publishing agent named Billie Westbrook and plans to obtain key from Dorothy so that she can lead Princess Langwidere, the Nome King and an army of winged monkeys, Nomes, and dragons into taking over Earth upon learning the Changing Word. The Wicked Witch of the West also had plans to invade Wonderland, Neverland, Camelot, Narnia, and Shangri-La.
- The Wicked Witch of the West has a cameo appearance in Legends of Oz: Dorothy's Return during one of the Jester's songs. The Jester is presented as her brother who was cursed to be trapped in a jester's costume by the Witch with Glinda noting that she didn't know the Witch had a sense of humor.
- The Wicked Witch of the West appears as a boss character and playable figure in the video game Lego Dimensions, voiced by Courtenay Taylor. She is the only playable character from the Wizard of Oz franchise. During the video game's story, she is the boss in the first level "Follow the LEGO Brick Road", where Batman, Gandalf, and Wyldstyle face off against her, who appears right after Dorothy and her friends go missing alongside the Ruby Slippers, and were able to defeat her with water and steal the Shift Keystone from her. Her hat is later salvaged by Lord Vortech.
- The Wicked Witch of the West appears in Tom and Jerry and the Wizard of Oz, voiced by Laraine Newman.
- In season 9 of the American television show Supernatural, the Wicked Witch (portrayed by Maya Massar) appears as the villain of the episode "Slumber Party".
- The Wicked Witch of the West appears in The Lego Batman Movie, voiced by Riki Lindhome who was uncredited for the role. She is one of many iconic movie villains imprisoned in the Phantom Zone. When Harley Quinn steals the Phantom Zone Projector from Arkham Asylum's evidence locker and frees Joker and the Phantom Zone inmates, the Wicked Witch unleashes the Winged Monkeys to cause mayhem in Gotham City. Eventually, the villains and sent back to the Phantom Zone.
- In the Amazon Prime animated series Lost in Oz, West (voiced by Nika Futterman) is the great, great-granddaughter of the Wicked Witch of the West who journeys with Dorothy Gale (the descendant of the original), her pet dog Toto, and a medium-sized munchkin name Ojo to help her return to Kansas after she lands in the futuristic magical land of Oz. When she becomes greedy, her skin turns green as if she's almost turning into her ancestor. However the true Wicked Witch of the West is revealed to be West aunt, Langwidere, a Wicked Witch and Cyra's sister. Contrary to her sister, who is good-hearted and loving, Langwidere is a cold-hearted and vengeful woman because of her hatred towards the Gales. Her plan is to become empress of Oz but ultimately fails and becomes trap in a magic paint by Smith and defeated by the great granddaughter of Dorothy Gale with the same name, Ojo, and her niece.
- The Wicked Witch of the West appears as one of the final antagonists in Chris Colfer's The Land of Stories series, after the Masked Man uses a potion to bring her, the Queen of Hearts (from Alice's Adventures in Wonderland), and Captain Hook (from Peter Pan) from their respective books. After betraying the Masked Man the three villains are eventually defeated by fictionalized versions of L. Frank Baum, Lewis Carroll, and J. M. Barrie brought to life by the same potion.
- In the third volume of Shazam!, the Wicked Witch of the West came from the Wozenderlands and is a member of the Monster Society of Evil. She was among its members imprisoned in the Dungeon of Eternity within the Monsterlands until Mister Mind instructed Doctor Sivana on how to free them. As Shazam fights the Mister Mind-controlled C.C. Batson, Freddy fights the Wicked Witch of the West and Jeepers. She does managed to use her spells to trap Eugene in some vines. When Shazam defeats Mister Mind, the resulting magical energy knocked out the Wicked Witch of the West and the rest of the Monster Society of Evil. The Monster Society of Evil was mentioned to have been remanded to Rock Falls Penitentiary where the Shazam Family built a special section to contain magical threats.
- The Wicked Witch of the West cameos in the Warner Bros. Serververse crowd in the 2021 film Space Jam: A New Legacy.
- In Andrew Kolb's OZ: A Fantasy Role-Playing Setting, The Wicked Witch of the West appears, under the name Verdella (an apparent reference to her green skin). In this version, she has been reworked into The Wicked Lich of the West; like the other witches of note in Oz, she cannot be killed unless her phylactery is destroyed.
- In the Marvel Cinematic Universe television series Agatha All Along, the witch Agatha Harkness (played by Kathryn Hahn) was dressed as the Wicked Witch of the West for the fourth witch trial in episode seven "Death's Hand in Mine" claiming 'she was based on me, you know?'
