= Wonderbug =

Segment on the Krofft Supershow

- C.C., Susan, Barry, and Wonderbug
- Genre: Superhero
- Created by: Joe Ruby; Ken Spears
- Starring: David Levy; John-Anthony Bailey; Carol Anne Seflinger [IMDB]
- Voices of: Frank Welker
- Composer: Jimmie Haskell
- Country of origin: United States
- No. of episodes: 22

Production
- Producer: Sid and Marty Krofft
- Running time: 15 minutes (per episode)
- Production companies: Sid and Marty Krofft Television Productions

Original release
- Network: ABC
- Release: September 11, 1976 – September 2, 1978

Wonderbug is a segment of the first and second season of the American television series The Krofft Supershow, from 1976 to 1978. It was shot in Hollywood, Los Angeles, California. The show was rerun as part of ABC's Sunday morning series.

== Plot ==
Wonderbug's alter ego "Schlep Car" (so named due to its personalized California license plate "SCHLEP") was an old, beat up, conglomeration of several junked cars that looked like a rusty dune buggy. Schlep Car was alive and could drive itself, and could also talk. It was found in a junk yard by teenagers Barry Buntrock (David Levy), C.C. McNamara (John Anthony Bailey) and Susan Talbot (Carol Anne Seflinger-). Schlepcar transformed into the shiny metal-flake red Wonderbug (vocal effects provided by Frank Welker) whenever a magic horn (which played the bugle call for "cavalry charge") was sounded. In his Wonderbug identity, the car had the power of flight and was able to help the three teens capture crooks and prevent wrongdoing.

In Wonderbug mode, the car was a Volkswagen-based Meyers Manx-clone body, a Dune Runner manufactured by Dune Buggy Enterprises of Westminster, California.

The car had articulated eyeball headlights, and a custom bumper that resembled a mouth; different bumpers were sometimes used to give the car different facial expressions. When the car spoke in its mumbling voice, a rubber puppet stand-in with a moving mouth was sometimes used.

The space that would normally contain the right rear passenger seat instead contained a box, described in dialog as "the costume/wardrobe trunk"; this box actually served to conceal a hidden driver in scenes in which the car drives itself. The car also had a long fender-mounted radio antenna that terminated with a robot-like claw or gripper. Its license plate would change to "1DERBUG".

Barry often thought he was the brains of the outfit, but it was usually Susan who came up with the ideas that saved them. A running gag was that Barry would suggest an outrageously implausible plan, its absurdity recognized by both C.C. and Susan. Susan would then suggest a far more sensible plan (usually involving disguises), which Barry would then suggest as if it were his own, prompting C.C. to praise Barry's supposed genius. Susan accepted the situation uncomplainingly, even telling a female character who observed one such exchange, "You get used to it".

== Other appearances ==
Wonderbug shared the one-hour time slot with other Krofft Supershow titles, including Magic Mongo, Bigfoot and Wildboy, Dr. Shrinker, The Lost Saucer, and Electra Woman and Dyna Girl.

Ideal Toy Company published a board game in 1977.

Aladdin Industries produced a metal lunchbox in 1976.

== Episodes ==
=== Season 1 (1976) ===
No.	Title	Original release date
1	"Go West, Young Schlepcar"	September 11, 1976
2	"Schlepnapped"	September 18, 1976
3	"I Kidd You Not"	September 25, 1976
4	"Keep on Schleppin"	October 2, 1976
5	"The Maltese Gooneybird"	October 9, 1976
6	"The Big Bink Bank Bungle"	October 16, 1976
7	"Wonderbug Express"	October 23, 1976
8	"Schlepfoot"	October 30, 1976
9	"Schlep O'Clock Rock"	November 6, 1976
10	"Anderson's Android"	November 13, 1976
11	"14-Karat Wonderbug"	November 20, 1976
12	"Horse Switched"	November 27, 1976
13	"Schleppenstein"	December 4, 1976
14	"No Foe Like a UFO"	December 11, 1976
15	"The Not So Great Race"	December 18, 1976
16	"Lights, Camera, Wonderbug!"	December 25, 1976

=== Season 2 (1977) ===
No.	Title	Original release date
17	"The Big Game"	September 10, 1977
18	"The Case of the Misfortune Cookie"	September 17, 1977
19	"Dirty Larry, Crazy Barry"	September 24, 1977
20	"Fish Story"	October 1, 1977
21	"Incredible Shrinking Wonderbug"	October 8, 1977
22	"Oil or Nothing"	October 15, 1977
