= Louise DuArt =

American actress

- Born: October 30, 1950 (age 75); Quincy, Massachusetts, United States
- Occupations: Comedian, impersonator
- Years active: 1971–present
- Spouse: SQuire Rushnell

Louise DuArt (born October 30, 1950) is an American comedian and impersonator.

== Career ==
DuArt was born in Quincy, Massachusetts. She began her career on the children's show The Krofft Supershow playing Nashville, a member of the fictional band Kaptain Kool and the Kongs. She later worked on Krofft's final kids' show, The Krofft Superstar Hour, in which Kaptain Kool and the Kongs were replaced with the Bay City Rollers; DuArt remained as a voice actor. She also hosted the game show Rodeo Drive in 1990, on Lifetime, wherein she did celebrity and character impersonations at times, especially during the show's second round of play; her notable impersonations include Edith Bunker, George Burns, Judge Judy, Joan Rivers and Barbara Walters. At around this time she also did voices on Garfield and Friends. DuArt toured with Harvey Korman and Tim Conway from 2001 to 2005. She now makes appearances on many religious-themed programs.

== Credits ==
=== Television ===
- Family Guy (voice) (2001)
- Bonkers (voice) (1993)
- Garfield and Friends (voice) (1993)
- Tiny Toon Adventures (voice) (1993)
- Louise DuArt: The Mouth That Roared (1989, Showtime special)
- Rodeo Drive (1990)
- Cafe DuArt
- Living the Life
- D.C. Follies (voice) (1987)
- Hollywood Squares (panelist) (1986–1989, 2004)
- Off the Wall (1986)
- The Krofft Superstar Hour (1978)
- American Bandstand (guest with Kaptain Kool & the Kongs) (1977)
- Kaptain Kool and the Kongs Present ABC All-Star Saturday (1977)
- The Krofft Supershow (1976)
- Jimmy Osmond Presents ABC's Saturday Sneak Peek (1976)
- The World of Sid & Marty Krofft at the Hollywood Bowl (1973)

=== Stage ===
- Together Again
- Many Voices Of Louise DuArt
- Glued To The Tube
- Catskills On Broadway
- Dreamstuff
- Me & Jezebel
