= Saturday morning preview specials =

Children's television specials

Saturday morning preview specials were aired on television annually to present previews of each network's fall lineup of Saturday-morning cartoon children's programming. Similar to the model for their new prime time counterpart shows, television networks in the United States and Canada would film a preview special for the fall season. These would often air as part of the regular network schedule or be made available to their affiliates for airing at any time, especially to fill timeslots that contained programming canceled months before.

== Format ==
The Saturday morning previews were generally aired on the network in prime-time, usually the Friday night before the new schedule began. Specials were staggered between differing time slots and days in order to allow each network's show to stand out.

The preview specials are usually hosted by stars of one or more of the network's popular series and feature an array of special guests, with the continuity between each program preview being fictionalized with a small plot or theme to keep viewers interested. The previews were for new and returning series, with each preview featuring the show's opening credits and a scene from that program. They also unveiled a network's new imaging for Saturday morning programming.

The specials often included previews for prime-time programming as well. According to Mark Evanier, who wrote several Saturday morning preview specials, this was because the network's prime-time department had to clear the time slot for the special, and convincing them to do so was difficult without agreeing to promote one of their shows in the special.

== History ==
Hanna-Barbera Productions created a half-hour syndicated film called "Here Comes a Star" (1964) with Bill Hanna and Joe Barbera playing themselves promoting its newest series, The Magilla Gorilla Show. The program, hosted by You Bet Your Life announcer George Fenneman, offered an inside look at the animation studio and a peek at the upcoming feature, Hey There, It's Yogi Bear. The first network preview special was The World of Secret Squirrel and Atom Ant (1965), a 60-minute special airing on NBC in primetime to celebrate Hanna-Barbera's first animated series made for Saturday morning television.

=== Decline ===
CBS, which had only irregularly carried preview specials, aired its last in 1985. The other two major networks continued near-annually. NBC's last was in 1991, as by 1992, the network had abandoned cartoons in favor of its teen sitcom block TNBC. ABC continued an annual Saturday preview special as part of its TGIF block through the 1990s, finally ending the practice in 1999, TGIF's last year in its original form.

4Kids Entertainment aired preview specials sporadically for its two blocks, FoxBox and The CW4Kids. Neither Fox Kids nor Kids' WB continued the practice as an annual tradition, though both had aired one-off preview specials in the 1990s.

For a number of Fox stations that affiliated or became owned by the network in the mid-1990s mainly because of the NFL on Fox, the preview specials were the only time those stations carried any mention of Fox Kids or 4Kids at all because of their preference for weekday and weekend local news, as the blocks actually aired on alternate stations in their markets owned by other parties (and as part of the Fox primetime schedule, those Fox stations could not refuse or offer the preview special to an alternate station), and neither the Fox station or children's block carrying stations promoted the arrangement with advertising during preview specials (unless they were co-owned stations). This often left the Fox station in the awkward position of promoting shows they did not carry or had any interest in, and the other station having no ability to use the preview special for their own promotional purposes.

== Year-by-year guide ==
=== Syndication ===
- 1964 - Here Comes a Star (hosted by George Fenneman) promoting The Magilla Gorilla Show

=== ABC ===
- 1969 - Super Saturday Cartoon Preview (hosted by the cast of The Ghost & Mrs. Muir and Jonathan Frid from Dark Shadows)
- 1971 - The Brady Bunch Visits ABC (hosted by the Brady Kids from The Brady Bunch)
- 1972 - The Brady Bunch Meet ABC's Saturday Superstars (hosted by the Brady Kids from The Brady Bunch)
- 1973 - Saturday Morning Sneak Peek (hosted by Avery Schreiber and Jack Burns)
- 1974 - Funshine Saturday Sneak Peek (hosted by Lee Majors from The Six Million Dollar Man)
- 1975 - Funshine Saturday Sneak Peek (hosted by Jim Nabors and Ruth Buzzi from The Lost Saucer)
- 1976 - Sneak Peek (hosted by Jimmy Osmond)
- 1977 - All-Star Saturday (hosted by Kaptain Kool and the Kongs)
- 1978 - All-Star Saturday (hosted by Jimmy McNichol and Kristy McNichol)
- 1979 - Plastic Man and ABC Saturday Morning Sneak Peek (hosted by Michael Young) - Due to a cartoonists' strike delaying show premieres, this special aired over two weeks before the season debuted, and a second preview special, The Plastic Man Preview Hour, aired on Saturday of the following week.
- 1982 - Pac Preview Party (hosted by Dick Clark)
- 1983 - Preview Special (hosted by Dick Clark)
- 1984 - Saturday Morning Preview Park (hosted by "Weird Al" Yankovic; featuring Wolfman Jack and Missy Gold)
- 1985 - Saturday Sneak Peek & Fun Fit Test (hosted by Tony Danza and Mary Lou Retton; featuring Anthony Daniels as C-3PO)
- 1988 - (hosted by cast of Mr. Belvedere)
- 1989 - Perfectly Strange Saturday Morning Preview (hosted by cast of Perfect Strangers)
- 1990 - ABC Saturday Morning Preview (hosted by Roseanne Barr and cast of Family Matters)
- 1991 - (hosted by cast of Family Matters)
- 1992 - ABC Sneak Peek with Step by Step (hosted by cast of Step by Step)
- 1993 - ABC Saturday Morning Preview Special (hosted by cast of Hangin' with Mr. Cooper)
- 1994 - Saturday Morning Preview Special (hosted by cast of Boy Meets World)
- 1995 - Saturday Morning Preview Special (hosted by Gary Owens, Marquise Wilson, Raven-Symoné, and Zachery Ty Bryan)
- 1996 - Saturday Morning Preview Party (hosted by Melissa Joan Hart)
- 1997 - One Saturday Morning (hosted by Charlie of Disney's One Saturday Morning, played by Jessica Prunell)
- 1998 - One Saturday Morning on Friday Night (hosted by Meme, played by Valarie Rae Miller, and Salem of Sabrina, the Teenage Witch)
- 1999 - One Saturday Morning on Friday Night (hosted by Meme, played by Valarie Rae Miller)

=== CBS ===
- 1969 - CBS Funtastic Preview (hosted by Sebastian Cabot, Johnny Whitaker and Anissa Jones of Family Affair)
- 1974 - Socko Saturday (hosted by The Hudson Brothers)
- 1975 - Dyn-o-mite Saturday (hosted by Bern Nadette Stanis, Jimmie Walker and Ralph Carter from Good Times)
- 1976 - Hey, Hey, Hey! It's the CBS Saturday Morning Preview Special (hosted by Fat Albert and the Cosby Kids)
- 1977 - The Wacko Saturday Morning Preview and Other Good Stuff Special (hosted by cast of Wacko)
- 1983 - Preview Special (hosted by Scott Baio; featuring Sorrell Booke, James Best, and the Krofft Puppets)
- 1984 - Saturday's the Place (hosted by Joyce DeWitt and Ted Knight) - The hosts tour an animation studio, the people in which are all real animation staff, not actors, and include Alan Zaslove, Larry Houston, and Bill Melendez.
- 1985 - All-Star Rock 'N' Wrestling Saturday Spectacular (hosted by "Rowdy" Roddy Piper; featuring Hervé Villechaize, Kareem Abdul-Jabbar, Gary Owens, New Edition, Pee-Wee Herman, Patti LaBelle, and Hulk Hogan)

=== NBC ===
- 1965 - The World of Secret Squirrel and Atom Ant (William Hanna and Joseph Barbera introduce The Atom Ant/Secret Squirrel Show)
- 1969 - The Banana Splits and Friends (hosted by The Banana Splits)
- 1972 - Howdy Doody and Friends (featuring the cast of Howdy Doody)
- 1973 - Starship Rescue (featuring Kevin Tighe and Randolph Mantooth from Emergency!; Billy Barty, Johnny Whitaker and Scott Kolden from Sigmund and the Sea Monsters; and characters from the world of Sid & Marty Krofft)
- 1974 - Preview Revue (hosted by Jimmy Osmond)
- 1975 - Preview Revue (hosted by The Lockers)
- 1976 - Smilin' Saturday Morning Parade (hosted by Freddie Prinze)
- 1977 - C'mon Saturday (hosted by Andrea McArdle from Annie)
- 1978 - The Bay City Rollers Meet the Saturday Superstars (hosted by the Bay City Rollers)
- 1979 - The Thing Meets Casper and the Shmoo (hosted by Gary Coleman) - Due to a cartoonists' strike delaying many season debuts, this special was cancelled and never aired.
- 1983 - The 1st Annual NBC Yummy Awards (hosted by Ricky Schroder and Dwight Schultz)
- 1984 - Laugh Busters (featuring Sandy Helberg, Thom Bray, Danny Cooksey, and Alfonso Ribeiro)
- 1985 - Back to Next Saturday (starring Keshia Knight Pulliam and Lisa Whelchel)
- 1986 - Alvin Goes Back to School
- 1987 - ALF Loves a Mystery (hosted by Benji Gregory & ALF from ALF)
- 1989 - Who Shrunk Saturday Morning? (hosted by cast of Saved by the Bell; featuring ALF, John Candy, John Moschitta Jr., Marsha Warfield and Sherman Hemsley)
- 1991 - NBC's World Premiere Cartoon Spectacular

=== FOX ===
- 1999 - Fox Kids Sneak Preview (hosted by cast of Malcolm in the Middle)
- 2002 - What's Inside the FoxBox? (hosted by cast of Spy Kids)
- 2003 - The Fight for the FoxBox

=== The WB ===
- 1995 - Welcome Home, Animaniacs! - Kids' WB Preview (hosted by Harland Williams)
- 1996 - Kids' WB! Sneak Peek

=== The CW ===
- 2008 - The CW4Kids Brand Spankin' New Spectacular Sneak Peek Party (hosted by Hudson Horstachio from Viva Piñata)
- 2010 - The CW4Kids Toonzai Friday Fall Preview (hosted by Sonic the Hedgehog from Sonic X)

== See also ==
- Saturday-morning cartoon
- Saturday morning pictures
