= The Krofft Supershow =

- Created by: Joe Ruby; Ken Spears
- Starring: Michael Lembeck; Debra Clinger; Mickey McMeel; Louise DuArt; Bert Sommer
- Country of origin: United States
- Original language: English
- No. of seasons: 2
- No. of episodes: 32

Production
- Producer: Sid and Marty Krofft
- Running time: 90 minutes (season 1); 60 minutes (season 2)
- Production companies: Sid & Marty Krofft Television Productions

Original release
- Network: ABC
- Release: September 11, 1976 – September 2, 1978

Related
- The Krofft Superstar Hour

The Krofft Supershow is a Saturday morning children's variety show, produced by Sid and Marty Krofft. It aired for two seasons from September 11, 1976, to September 2, 1978, on ABC.

== Background ==
The show was composed of several live-action segments, hosted by "Kaptain Kool and the Kongs", a rock band created for the series. The season one (1976–1977) segments were Dr. Shrinker, Electra Woman and Dyna Girl, and Wonderbug, plus reruns of The Lost Saucer for the first half of the season (they were dropped when the show was cut from 90 minutes to one hour). For season two (1977–1978), Dr. Shrinker and Electra Woman and Dyna Girl were dropped and replaced with Bigfoot and Wildboy and Magic Mongo. Each live-action segment was about 15 minutes in length.

Instead of a third season, the show was massively revamped (and moved to NBC) to feature the then-popular Bay City Rollers. Now retitled The Krofft Superstar Hour, Kaptain Kool and the Kongs were replaced by the Rollers, and new live-action segments Horror Hotel and The Lost Island replaced the older ones.

== Show segments ==
=== Kaptain Kool and the Kongs ===
This group was a manufactured band responsible for hosting the show, introducing the other live-action segments, and performing skits and songs. For the first season, Kaptain Kool and the Kongs were portrayed as a wacky glam rock band. Segments were videotaped at the short-lived World of Sid and Marty Krofft indoor amusement park in Atlanta. For season two, their image was toned down, and they were downsized from a five-person band to a four-person band. Their season-two segments were taped in a studio with an audience of children.

After the group was replaced by the Bay City Rollers, the group made appearances on other Sid and Marty Krofft productions, including Donny & Marie, The Brady Bunch Variety Hour, and The Krofft Komedy Hour. They also made an appearance on Dick Clark's American Bandstand and they starred in two primetime TV specials featuring previews of ABC's Saturday-morning lineup.

Cast:

- Kaptain Kool: Michael Lembeck
- Superchick: Debra Clinger
- Turkey: Mickey McMeel
- Nashville: Louise DuArt
- Flatbush: Bert Sommer (season 1 only)

Two albums were released featuring Kaptain Kool and the Kongs, both in 1978: the self-titled Kaptain Kool and the Kongs featured the band singing, and Stories from the Krofft TV Supershow includes several comedy skits. In addition, they released one single, "And I Never Dreamed", written by Harvey Scales backed with "Sing Me a Song".

=== Dr. Shrinker ===
Dr. Shrinker is an evil scientist with a lab on an uncharted island. When teenagers Brad, B.J., and Gordie are stranded on the island, Dr. Shrinker subjects them to his shrinker machine. They manage to escape the lab in miniature form; the series follows their adventures as they try to evade the clutches of the mad scientist and his assistant Hugo.

Cast:

- Dr. Shrinker: Jay Robinson
- Hugo: Billy Barty
- Brad: Ted Eccles
- B.J.: Susan Lawrence
- Gordie: Jeff MacKay

=== Electra Woman and Dyna Girl ===
Lori and Judy, reporters for Newsmaker magazine, are secretly Electra Woman and Dyna Girl, crime-fighting superheroines. Assisted by their friend Frank Heflin, they fought such supervillains as the Pharaoh and Cleopatra, the Sorcerer, Glitter Rock, Ali Baba, Spider Lady, and the Empress of Evil.

Cast:

- Electra Woman/Lori: Deidre Hall
- Dyna Girl/Judy: Judy Strangis
- Frank Heflin: Norman Alden

=== Wonderbug ===
Barry, C.C., and Susan are three teenaged friends who fixed up an old dune buggy (which they dubbed "Schlepcar"). When they attach a magic horn to the car, Schlepcar comes to life as Wonderbug. Wonderbug could fly, and it helped the teens fight crime.

Cast:

- Barry: David Levy
- C.C.: Jack Baker (as John Anthony Bailey)
- Susan: Carol Anne Seflinger
- Wonderbug (voice): Frank Welker

=== Magic Mongo ===
When teenagers Donald, Lorraine, and Kristy find an old bottle, they discover it is the home of a genie named Mongo. Mongo's magical attempts to help his young masters lead to many wacky misadventures.

Cast:

- Mongo: Lennie Weinrib
- Donald: Paul Hinckley
- Lorraine: Helaine Lembeck
- Kristy: Robin Dearden
- Ace: Bart Braverman
- Duncey: Larry Larsen

=== Bigfoot and Wildboy ===
After Wildboy was orphaned in the Pacific Northwest, he was found and raised by Bigfoot, the legendary man-beast of the forest. The two work together to fight those who would harm the forest. In this series Bigfoot displayed "bionic" super powers in imitation of The Six Million Dollar Man, which was popular at this time; though this series never directly referenced the prime-time show. They were aided in the first season by Suzie, 12-year-old daughter of Ranger Lucas; in the second season, Suzie was replaced by Cindy, a young archeology student.

The episodes of "Bigfoot and Wildboy" that aired on The Krofft Supershow were 15 minutes in length. In 1979, ABC brought back the show as a stand-alone series by editing the 15-minute segments into 30-minute episodes. New episodes were also filmed and aired in the summer of 1979.

Cast:

- Bigfoot: Ray Young
- Wildboy: Joseph Butcher
- Suzie: Monika Ramirez
- Ranger Lucas: Ned Romero

== Comic book ==
Gold Key Comics published a Krofft Supershow comic book which ran for six issues from April 1978 to January 1979.
