= Sid & Marty Krofft's Red Eye Express =

- Written by: David L. Lander; Paul Elbling
- Directed by: Bill Davis
- Starring: Ron Reagan; Rick Astley; Gloria Estefan and the Miami Sound Machine; Eric Carmen; Chuck Berry; Paul Rodriguez; Lou Albano
- Country of origin: United States

Production
- Producer: Sid and Marty Krofft
- Running time: 60 minutes

Original release
- Network: CBS
- Release: March 9, 1988

Sid and Marty Krofft's Red Eye Express was a late-night variety special that aired on CBS on March 9, 1988. It was the lowest-rated program on network television that week.

== Plot ==
Featuring a format similar to the Kroffts' then-current syndicated series, D.C. Follies, Ron Reagan stars as the owner of The Red Eye Express, a nightclub frequented by celebrities (and celebrity look-alike Krofft puppets). Through the course of the hour, Reagan mingles with various puppets (Cher, Jack Nicholson, Whoopi Goldberg, Ronald Reagan Sr., etc.), real-life people (Chuck Berry, Lou Albano) and performing guests (Gloria Estefan, Eric Carmen, Rick Astley).

== Music ==
- Gloria Estefan and the Miami Sound Machine – "Anything for You", "Surrender"
- Rick Astley – "Never Gonna Give You Up"
- Eric Carmen – "Hungry Eyes"
