= Robin Dearden =

American actress (born 1953)

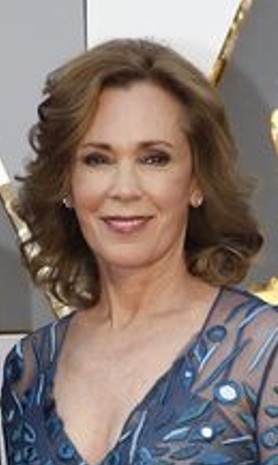
- Robin Dearden at the 88th Academy Awards ceremony
- Born: Robin Gale Dearden; December 4, 1953 (age 72); Los Angeles, California, U.S.
- Other name: Robin Cranston
- Occupation: Actress
- Years active: 1977–present
- Known for: Magic Mongo; Generations; Magnum, P.I.
- Spouse: Bryan Cranston (m. 1989)
- Children: Taylor Dearden
- Relatives: Joseph Cranston (father-in-law)

Robin Gale Dearden (born December 4, 1953) is an American actress known for the television series Magic Mongo, Generations, and Magnum, P.I.

== Early life ==
Robin Gale Dearden was born in Los Angeles, California, on December 4, 1953 to Richard (1920–1993) and Helen (née Ernst; 1924–2017) Dearden. She has a sister named Diane.

== Personal life ==
Dearden is married to American actor and filmmaker Bryan Cranston. They wed on July 8, 1989, and their daughter Taylor Dearden was born on February 12, 1993. Her father-in-law was producer and actor Joseph Cranston.

== Filmography ==
=== Film ===
Year	Title	Role	Notes
1985	Stitches	Nancy McNaughton	Comedy film
1988	The Big Turnaround	Restaurant Waitress	Action film
1999	Last Chance	Lauren	
2001	The Shrink Is In	Mrs. Coleman (scenes deleted)	
2001	Wooly Boys	Kate Harper	
2004	Myron's Movie	Julia	
2004	Illusion	Diane	Romance film
2017	Chicanery	Diana Flare	

=== Television ===
Year	Title	Role	Notes
1977	Magic Mongo	Kristy	16 episodes
1977	The Krofft Supershow	Kristy	16 episodes
1978	David Cassidy: Man Undercover	Carol Sommers	Episode: "Baby Makes Three"
1979	Family	Peggy	Episode: "Prelude"
1979	Bigfoot and Wildboy		Episode: "Meteor Menace"
1979	B.J. and the Bear	Sue Anne Lumm	Episode: "Gasohol"
1980	To Race the Wind	Mary (uncredited)	television film
1980	Trouble in High Timber Country	Joanna Yeager	television film
1980	Fugitive Family	Nancy Roberts	television film
1980	The Asphalt Cowboy	Rosie Caulpepper	television film
1979–1981	The Incredible Hulk	Joleen Collins; Rachel	Episode: "Brain Child"; Episode: "Danny"
1981	Happy Days	Mona Hildebrand	Episode: "The Other Guy"
1982	Love, Sidney	A Grown Patti	Episode: "Patti, the Torch"
1981–1982	Magnum, P.I.	Mandy, the Flight Attendant; Lexi Ziller	Episode: "No Need to Know"; Episode: "The Elmo Ziller Story"
1983	Murder 1, Dancer 0	Jenny Burnell	television film
1983	Matt Houston	Constance	Episode: "The Ghost of Carter Gault"
1983	The A-Team	Kathy	Episode: "The Taxicab Wars"
1984	Masquerade		Episode: "Spanish Gambit"
1984	Earthlings	Sally	television film
1985	Highway to Heaven	Libby Hall	Episode: "One Winged Angels"
1983–1985	Knight Rider	Liberty Cox; Mel	Episode: "Give Me Liberty... or Give Me Death"; Episode: "Buy Out"
1986	Crazy Like a Fox	Joanna Blake	Episode: "Hearing Is Believing"
1986	New Love, American Style		Episode: "Love and the Beeper"
1986	Airwolf	Alicia Kincaid	Episode: "Desperate Monday"
1982-1986	T.J. Hooker	Michelle Forrest; Officer Karen Remy	Episode: "Big Foot"; Episode: "Taps for Officer Remy"
1987	Outlaws	Elektra	Episode: "Pursued"
1988	9 to 5		Episode: "The Big Sleep"
1990	Generations	Kate Wilson	26 episodes
1991	The New Adam-12	Julie Copeland	Episode: "Deadly Trade"
1987-1991	Murder, She Wrote	Kay Davis; Gail Sutton; Lisa Sutton	Episode: "The Corpse Flew First Class"; Episode: "The Taxman Cometh"; Episode: "The Committee"
2005	Grounded for Life	Lois	Episode: "Oh, What a Knight"
2010	Breaking Bad	Emotional Woman	Episode: "No Mas"
2016	Fantasy Hospital	Chief Kuckles (voice)	10 episodes
