= Squire D. Rushnell =

American author and TV executive

- Citizenship: United States
- Occupations: Producer; Writer
- Spouse: Louise DuArt
- Writing career
- Pen name: SQuire Rushnell
- Language: English
- Genre: Inspirational
- Notable works: The Kingdom Chums: Little David's Adventure; When God Winks at You

Squire D. Rushnell, also known as SQuire Rushnell, is an American author and inspirational speaker and former television executive. His books in the When God Winks series have appeared on the New York Times bestseller list.

== Television career ==
Rushnell was a successful television executive who led Good Morning America to first place for the first time, and was a father of Schoolhouse Rock which shared 75 Emmys with The ABC Afterschool Specials and other children's programs under his leadership.

=== The Kingdom Chums ===
Rushnell started the project The Kingdom Chums as ABC's vice-president for long-range planning and children's television. Speaking on the general landscape of children's television, Rushnell stated that he "felt that there were a lot of weeds in this garden...I think that we can make it better."

== Post-television career ==
According to Lisa Belkin, writing in the New York Times, his first book was published by a small press with modest sales in late 2001. Today his books in print exceed one million. Rushnell also tours as an inspirational speaker for, among others, Habitat for Humanity.

== Godwink ==
Rushnell is credited with coining the term godwink, which he defines as "An event or personal experience, often identified as coincidence, so astonishing that it could only have come from divine origin." Paul Froese and Christopher Bader wrote in their book America's Four Gods: What We Say about God-- & what that Says about Us that Rushnell has trademarked the term.

== Works ==
- SQuire Rushnell (2006). When God Winks at You: How God Speaks Directly to You Through the Power of Coincidence. Thomas Nelson Incorporated. ISBN 9780785218920.
- SQuire Rushnell, Louise DuArt (2008). Couples Who Pray: The Most Intimate Act Between a Man and a Woman. Thomas Nelson Incorporated. ISBN 9780785227946.
- SQuire Rushnell (2013). Divine Alignment: How Godwink Moments Guide Your Journey. Howard Books. ISBN 9781451667776.
- SQuire Rushnell, Louise DuArt (2016). The 40 Day Prayer Challenge: Unlocking the Power of Partnered Prayer. Howard Books. ISBN 9781501119675.
