= The Kingdom Chums: Little David's Adventure =

1986 American TV special

- Genre: Children's special Religious
- Based on: Kingdom Chums by Squire D. Rushnell
- Teleplay by: Jeffrey Scott; Jeanne Betancourt
- Directed by: Animation: Bernard Deyriès; Live action: Colin Chilvers
- Starring: Christopher Fitzgerald; Jenna von Oÿ; Andrew Cassese; Scott Menville; Sandi Patti; Paul Winchell; Phil Proctor
- Theme music composer: Joe Raposo
- Country of origin: United States
- Original language: English

Production
- Producers: Animation: Jean Chalopin; Andy Heyward; Tetsuo Katayama
- Editors: Live-action segments: Stan Wernow
- Running time: 60 minutes
- Production companies: ABC Productions; DIC Animation City; Diane Kerew Productions
- Budget: US$1.5 million

Original release
- Network: ABC
- Release: November 28, 1986

Related
- The Kingdom Chums: Original Top Ten (1990)

The Kingdom Chums: Little David's Adventure (onscreen title: Kingdom Chums) is a 1986 animated television special, inspired by the Biblical tale of David and Goliath, and originally broadcast on the ABC network in the United States. In the special, three schoolchildren from the real world are transported into the world of the Bible, with the help of three magical stuffed animals. One of them, a raccoon named David, becomes his Biblical namesake and faces off against a giant bull named Goliath.

Little David's Adventure was created (and originally written) by Squire Rushnell, head of the children's programming department at ABC. The special, featuring live-action and animated segments, was produced by the network and DIC Animation City. It premiered on ABC on November 28, 1986 to low ratings and subsequent mixed reviews. Out of several attempts to continue the franchise, a video sequel called The Kingdom Chums: Original Top Ten debuted in 1990, and aired as an ABC Weekend Special two years later.

== Plot ==
A boy named Peter, his sister Mary Ann, and his Jewish classmate Sauli are students of the All Nations School. One day at the school, bullies pick on Sauli and throw his yarmulke away. While trying to get it, Sauli accidentally knocks over a box that Mary Ann is keeping her pet bird in. Thinking he has killed it, he feels worried when the children reach home.

A strange, bright constellation suddenly appears in the sky outside their window. Peter consults his computer for the formation, but finds out it does not exist. After Mary Ann takes a look for herself, she uses a pen to reveal the word "LOVE" on the screen. Eventually, the lights swarm inside and bring her stuffed toys to life—Little David, the Raccoon of Courage; Christopher, the Lion of Love; and Magical Mose, the Tiger of Joy. No sooner do the creatures appear inside the computer than the children are zapped into it.

Peter, Mary Ann and Sauli end up being animated characters, and the animals introduce themselves as the Kingdom Chums. Following a magical beam called the "Love Light", the children travel to ancient Israel with David, one of the Chums. The raccoon enacts his Biblical namesake, gets into battle with his fellow Israelites, and is granted a challenge from King Saul (who is portrayed as a lion) to fight against the giant warthog, Goliath.

David prepares his slingshot with some stones, and faces the tall Philistine foe. He throws one of the stones upon Goliath's forehead, and the giant crushes down to the ground. Peter, Sauli and Mary Ann are about to cheer for David's victory, but then his brothers suddenly chase after them. A rainbow carries the group back to Christopher and Mose, who return them back to where they started.

The children realize that only one minute has passed in the real world since their adventure began. Thanks to her faith (and her toys), Mary Ann is delighted to see her bird alive. As Sauli heads to his apartment for dinner, he manages to face his bullies with his own faith and overcome them.

== Cast ==
Name	Character	Source
Live action scenes		
Jenna von Oÿ	Mary Ann	
Christopher Fitzgerald	Peter	
Andrew Cassese	Sauli	
Animated scenes
Scott Menville	Little David	
Sandi Patti	Little David (singing voice)	
John Franklin	Magical Mose	
Billy Bowles	Christopher / Cat Soldier	
Jim Cummings	Goliath / Fox Soldier #3	
Townsend Coleman	Elias / Fox Soldier #2	
Paul Winchell	King Saul	
Phil Proctor	Rat Soldier / Frog Servant / Fox Soldier #1	

== Production ==
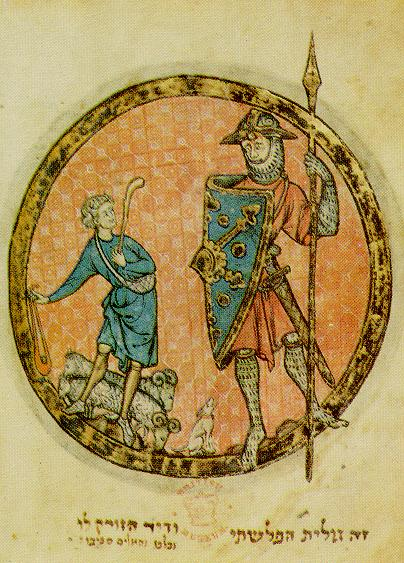
Squire Rushnell based the Kingdom Chums special on the Biblical tale of David and Goliath.

Kingdom Chums: Little David's Adventure was conceived by Squire Rushnell, who was the vice-president of the ABC network's children's programming department. In the early 1980s, Rushnell wrote a book version of the special, which took him at least six years to develop; he even took on the duty by himself after three writers failed to produce a satisfactory draft. Rushnell managed to devote a week of his time towards this task, while he and his wife were awaiting a son. While writing the book, he removed several religious allusions in case they could offend potential audiences; this led him to comment, "[ABC's] Standards and Practices people white-knuckle over this sort of thing. The first thing they say is, 'It's not dogmatic, is it?'" Despite having no literary ambitions, Rushnell reasoned: "My feeling on this property at the beginning was [that] we should legitimize it as a book before it became a television property." The publishing division of Word Inc., a Christian media firm then owned by ABC, released the book in June 1986. Another three titles, focusing on Esther, Miriam and the resurrection of Jesus, were in the works.

During development, Rushnell was influenced by Disney animated films such as 1973's Robin Hood, and modeled the All Nations School after New York City's United Nations International School. He based two of the animal characters on Bible characters—Christopher after Jesus, and Magical Mose on Moses. He also toned down the climax of the original David and Goliath story, in which David cuts the Goliath's head. Along with bookending live-action segments, the special also featured animation work from DIC Animation City. The animation unit's director, Bernard Deyriès, was previously among the major crew of 1985's Rainbow Brite and the Star Stealer. The songs, composed by Sesame Street's Joe Raposo, included "Greatest Stories of All", "Child of God" and "Your Love Makes Me Strong".

== Release and reception ==
The Kingdom Chums special premiered on ABC on November 28, 1986, at 8:00 p.m. Eastern time, pre-empting Webster and Mr. Belvedere. In the Nielsen ratings, it was among the lowest-ranked programs during the week of November 24–30 (out of 70 tracked), along with another family special, Disney's Fluppy Dogs. Little David's Adventure came in at 66th place with an 8.6 rating. (Note: A rating in the Nielsen system represents the percentage of households in the United States watching a certain program. At the time Kingdom Chums aired, there were 87.4 million households with a TV set.)

Reporting on the special in the Minneapolis Star-Tribune, Noel Holston gave a negative response:

The inclusion of the religious elements notwithstanding, Little David's Adventure is an expurgated retelling of the story. Although it does show Goliath's fall, it's unclear whether he's dead or just knocked out. The general absence of violence is faithful neither to this particular story nor the times, yet this is an instance where showing violence would not be exploitative. How ironic that ABC would subject a Bible story to stricter standards than, say, its Saturday morning Ghostbusters cartoons. ... Many viewers who believe in God probably will not be thrilled to see the story of David and Goliath reduced to the insipid level of Care Bears, The Wuzzles or any of the dozen other animated series that specialize in mild homilies. Inasmuch as the Bible stories have enduring theological and literary significance, I'm not sure children are served by Rushnell's sincere but condescending approach.

Alan Bunce of The Christian Science Monitor gave a mixed review: "Creatively, the program easily qualifies as high-quality children's entertainment. But reaction to the message will also depend on a viewer's individual tolerance of the show's free-wheeling treatment of religious themes, and its use of fantasy, magic, and symbolism in delivering Judeo-Christian messages. These flow through the dialogue and the show's bouncy musical numbers." Robert Bianco of the Pittsburgh Press was concerned over the depiction of Bible characters as animals, and their merchandising potential thereof. On the character of David, he wrote, "... I suppose [he] has suffered greater indignities than being turned into a religious Care Bear." The Hollywood magazine Variety (in its December 10, 1986 issue) thought it was ill-suited as a network show for children, and remarked that the "plodding story has too little action or humor or plot to keep many kids entertained". In 1989, Texe Marrs referred to Little David's Adventure as "sacrilegious and New Age to the hilt". The special received a positive review from Dale and Karen Mason, the authors of 1996's How to Get the Best Out of TV Before It Gets the Best Out of You.

== Sequel ==
From the time of Kingdom Chums' initial broadcast, ABC planned several follow-up specials along with a regular series. One of the planned specials involved a bear named Princess Essie, in an adaptation of the story of Esther; another was to be based on the New Testament. By late 1987, the network looked into partnering with The Walt Disney Company on a series of hour-long episodes. Instead, Little David's Adventure was followed by a 1990 video sequel, The Kingdom Chums: Original Top Ten. A new animation team, headed by Rick Reinert, worked on the production; this time, there were no live-action segments. One character, Osborne, replaces the previous protagonist Sauli here, and some character names were altered as well. It also aired in April 1992, and again in April 1993, as part of the ABC Weekend Specials anthology.

=== Cast ===
- Debby Boone as Essie
- Marilyn McCoo as Little Mama Miriam
- Tony Orlando as Christopher
- Billy Preston as Marvelous Mose
- Frankie Valli as Little David
- Mayim Bialik as Petey
- Scott Menville as Osborne
- Marne Patterson as Annie

== See also ==
- Superbook, an early 1980s Christian anime series with a similar premise

== Bibliography ==
- Rushnell, Squire (1986). Hazen, Barbara Shook (ed.). The Kingdom Chums: Little David's Adventure. Word Inc. ISBN 0-8499-8228-6.
