= Trauma (1962 film) =

1962 American film directed by Robert M. Young

- Directed by: Robert M. Young
- Written by: Robert M. Young
- Produced by: Joseph Cranston (producer); Sal Mungo (associate producer)
- Starring: Lynn Bari
- Cinematography: Jacques R. Marquette
- Edited by: Hal Dennis
- Music by: Buddy Collette
- Distributed by: Parade Releasing Organization
- Release date: 1962
- Running time: 92 minutes
- Country: United States
- Language: English

Trauma is a 1962 American film directed by Robert Malcolm Young and starring Lynn Bari and John Conte.

== Plot ==
Eight years after her aunt Helen Garrison is killed, newlywed niece Emmaline and husband Warren return to the home where Helen died, as Emmaline tries to recall events from that fateful night that her mind has blacked out.

Suspicious figures lurk throughout the house, and even Warren ends up placed under arrest by treasury agents. It ultimately turns out that Luther, a caretaker, committed one murder years ago, then killed eyewitness Helen to ensure her silence.

== Cast ==
- John Conte as Warren Clyner
- Lynn Bari as Helen Garrison
- Lorrie Richards as Emmaline Garrison
- David Garner as Craig Schoonover
- Warren J. Kemmerling as Luther
- William Bissell as Thaddeus Hall
- Bond Blackman as Robert
- William Justine as Treasury Agent
- Ray Lennert as Treasury Agent
- Renee Mason as Carla
- Robert Totten as Gas Station Attendant
- Alfred Chafe as Police Officer
- Ruby Borner as Maid

== Soundtrack ==
- "Emmaline's Theme" (Written by Buddy Collette and Minette Allton)
