= The World of Sid & Marty Krofft at the Hollywood Bowl =

- Directed by: Dennis Steinmetz
- Starring: Johnny Whitaker; Jack Wild; Louise DuArt; Paul Gale; Billy Barty; The Brady Bunch Kids
- Country of origin: United States
- Original language: English

Production
- Producer: Sid and Marty Krofft
- Running time: 60 minutes

Original release
- Network: Syndication
- Release: November 24, 1973

The World of Sid & Marty Krofft at the Hollywood Bowl is a live show at the Hollywood Bowl on July 29, 1973 that was filmed and aired as a television special, produced by Sid and Marty Krofft. It originally aired in syndication on Thanksgiving weekend, November 24, 1973. Although shot at the Hollywood Bowl in front of a live audience, the special also used a laugh track, like other Krofft shows, for sweetening.

== Synopsis ==
The special consists of a series of performances and skits based around the shows of Sid and Marty Krofft:

- Johnny Whitaker hosts the show and performs "Friends," the theme song from Sigmund and the Sea Monsters.
- Jack Wild appears as Jimmy, who searches high and low for his friend H.R. Pufnstuf (Van Snowden).
- H.R. Pufnstuf's resident villain, Wilhelmina W. Witchiepoo (Louise DuArt, substituting for Billie Hayes) and Lidsville's wacky magician Horatio J. Hoodoo (Paul Gale, substituting for Charles Nelson Reilly) each showcase their unique magic talents.
- The Brady Bunch Kids (Barry Williams, Maureen McCormick, Christopher Knight, Eve Plumb, Mike Lookinland, Susan Olsen) perform a medley of songs, though they would not appear in a Krofft TV production until The Brady Bunch Hour in 1976.

== Alternate versions ==
Originally the special was broadcast in an hour-long timeslot with a total running time of 50 minutes (sans commercials). In 1995, Nick at Nite aired the special in a half-hour timeslot during their "Pufapalooza" marathon. This version was missing the opening sequence (Billy Barty and other little people prepared the stage) and all of the scenes with Witchiepoo and Hoodoo. The special later aired frequently in an hour-long timeslot on TV Land with some minor trims to compensate for increased commercial time.

The uncut version of the special was released on VHS by Rhino Home Video in 1997 under the title H.R. Pufnstuf Live at the Hollywood Bowl.
