= Saturday morning pictures =

Saturday morning pictures were film shows put on in British cinemas between the 1920s and 1970s for children. They were shown on Saturday mornings and the price was normally 6d (2½p). At their peak, nearly 2,000 British cinemas put on a Saturday children’s matinee show, but by 1978 this had dropped to 300. Attendances in 1971 were over 800,000 per week.

Films shown included comedy classics, cowboy and adventure films, cartoons, ‘’Zorro’’, ‘’Batman’’ episodes and also films produced by the Children's Film Foundation. The programme often included community singing of songs such as Do-re-mi, with a pointer tracing the lyrics on the screen to help the audience follow. The ABC chain promoted its “Minors Matinees” as providing ‘’Good films, good fun and good fellowship”.

On 5 October 2013 the Cinema Museum in Kennington, London recreated a Saturday Morning Pictures show, with ticket prices between £3 and £5.

== Origins ==
Caroline Moorehead's biography of Sidney Bernstein states that the idea of film shows for children on Saturday mornings came from Bernstein in 1928, and that he asked Jean Harvey, secretary of the Film Society, to develop suitable programming. The first matinee was a showing of Robinson Crusoe at the Empire at Willesden, and the concept was then rolled out across other Bernstein-owned cinemas. Attendees became known as Granadiers, in reference to Bernstein's Granada company.

== See also ==
- Saturday-morning cartoon
- Saturday morning preview specials
