= Stitches (1985 film) =

1985 film

- Directed by: Rod Holcomb (Note: Credited as Alan Smithee.)
- Written by: Michel Choquette; Michael Paseornek
- Produced by: Robert P. Marcucci
- Starring: Parker Stevenson; Geoffrey Lewis; Eddie Albert; Brian Tochi; Robin Dearden
- Cinematography: Héctor R. Figueroa; Lennon
- Edited by: John Duffy
- Music by: Bob Floke
- Distributed by: International Film Marketing; Succéfilm AB
- Release date: November 1985
- Running time: 89 minutes
- Country: United States
- Language: English

Stitches is a 1985 American comedy film about medical students. Directed by Rod Holcomb, credited as Alan Smithee, the film stars Parker Stevenson and Geoffrey Lewis. Other actors include Eddie Albert and Brian Tochi.

== Plot ==
An obnoxious student and his buddies play obnoxious pranks on women at a school of medicine.
