= Louise DuArt: The Mouth That Roared =

Louise DuArt: The Mouth That Roared is a 1989 Showtime comedy special featuring Louise DuArt's impersonations of Woody Allen, Ruth Westheimer (Dr. Ruth), Carol Burnett, Barbra Streisand, Cher, Tammy Faye Bakker, George Burns, Gracie Allen, and many more.

== Synopsis ==
The show starts with DuArt saying she invited all these stars to be on her show, but for one reason or another they couldn't attend. Her solution was to play all the stars herself.

The show then takes on the premise that fictional talk show host Iris Lupitsky is the last remaining talk show host in America. Her co-host is Edith Bunker. She appears in split screen with her guests, as she plays both parts. Her guests include Barbara Walters (who has a clip of an interview with Tammy Faye Bakker), George Burns (who shows a clip of he and Gracie in a performance), Woody Allen (who has a clip of himself in therapy with Dr. Ruth) and Joan Rivers. There are bits with Barbra Streisand, Cher, Jane Fonda, and Katharine Hepburn. There are fake commercials featuring Carol Burnett and Yoko Ono. The show's end credits feature her doing Cyndi Lauper.
