= John Bailey (American actor) =

American actor (1947–1994)

- Bailey as C.C. in the show Wonderbug
- Born: John Anthony Bailey; June 4, 1947; Cleveland, Ohio, U.S.
- Died: November 13, 1994 (aged 47); Los Angeles, California, United States
- Other name: Jack Baker
- Education: Merritt College
- Occupation: Actor
- Years active: 1965–1994
- Children: 2 (John and Alida)

John Anthony Bailey (June 4, 1947 – November 13, 1994) was an American actor and pornographic film actor. He appeared in mainstream film and television productions during the 1970s, most notably as C.C. McNamara on Wonderbug (1976–78), before later transitioning into an adult film career under the stage name Jack Baker.

== Early life ==
Bailey was born and raised in Cleveland, Ohio. He lived in San Francisco, California, during the early 1970s, where he attended Merritt College in Oakland.

== Career ==
=== Mainstream acting ===
While living in the San Francisco Bay Area, Bailey performed in numerous stage and film productions. His performances included Richard Wesley's The Black Terror, for John Cochran's Black Repertory West, J. E. Franklin's Black Girl, work with the improvisational theatre group, The Pitschel Players, and appearances with other Bay Area theater companies. Bailey also appeared in the Sun Ra film Space Is the Place (1974).

Bailey is best known for the role of C.C. McNamara on the Sid and Marty Krofft children's television program Wonderbug (1976). He also appeared in two episodes of Happy Days as "Sticks" Downey, the drummer of Richie's band; M*A*S*H, Good Times, and in the sketch comedy film The Kentucky Fried Movie (1977).

=== Adult films ===
During the 1980s, Bailey began a career in pornographic films under the pseudonym Jack Baker. In 1984, he appeared in Let Me Tell Ya 'bout White Chicks, produced and directed by Gregory Dark. His other collaborations with Dark include New Wave Hookers (1985), The Devil in Miss Jones 3: A New Beginning and The Devil in Miss Jones 4: The Final Outrage (both 1986).

Although his pornographic career initially had often called on him to participate in the explicit sex scenes, somewhere around the time of the "Miss Jones" movies, he had largely, for the most part, ceased performing hardcore sex on-screen, and became known as a "non-sex" actor in the business. His adult roles (particularly for the Dark Brothers) often were comedic in nature, and poked fun at racial stereotypes.

According to the Internet Adult Film Database, Bailey appeared in more than 140 films and produced one movie. In addition to acting in adult films, Bailey also worked as a dialogue coach and occasional director.

== Death ==
Bailey died of bladder cancer in 1994, at the age of 47, in Los Angeles, California. He was buried in The Los Angeles County Cemetery.
