= Wooly Boys =

2001 film

- Directed by: Leszek Burzynski
- Written by: Max Enscoe; Annie DeYoung; George Buck Flower; Ed Hansen; Glen Stephens
- Produced by: Robert Schwartz
- Starring: Peter Fonda; Kris Kristofferson; Joseph Mazzello; Keith Carradine; Robin Dearden
- Cinematography: William Wages
- Edited by: Andrew S. Eisen; Stephen Rivkin
- Music by: Hummie Mann
- Release date: 2001
- Running time: 99 minutes
- Country: United States
- Language: English
- Box office: $335,726

Wooly Boys is a 2001 American adventure comedy drama film directed by Leszek Burzynski and starring Peter Fonda, Kris Kristofferson, and Joseph Mazzello. The screenplay concerns sheep ranchers in the Badlands of North Dakota. North Dakota's first full-length feature film, it was financed by the Bank of North Dakota, but did not do well at the box office.

== Plot ==
A.J. "Stoney" Stoneman, a grizzled sheep rancher from Medora, North Dakota, is tricked by Sheriff Hank Dawson into taking a trip to see his daughter Kate Harper in Minneapolis, Minnesota. While there, Stoney ends up bonding with his 16-year old grandson, Charles, whom he hadn't seen in nine years. Charles is also part of the plot to get Stoney help for a serious health issue. Charles tells Stoney his mother is in the hospital, so they leave for the hospital. Upon arriving at the hospital, Stoney finds out that Kate was only "in" the hospital to trick Stoney into having an examination. Stoney and Kate have a bout with words as Stoney is leaving and he collapses from an aneurysm, thereby causing him to be hospitalized. With the aid of his rancher pal, Shuck, Stoney escapes the hospital—with Charles in tow—for what becomes a life-changing adventure as Charles discovers his family roots and what it means to be a “wooly boy”.

== Cast ==
- Peter Fonda as A.J. "Stoney" Stoneman
- Kris Kristofferson as Shuck
- Joseph Mazzello as Charles
- Keith Carradine as Sheriff Hank Dawson
- Robin Dearden as Kate Harper

== Production ==
Filming was done in the North Dakota towns of Medora, Belfield, Fryburg, and Beach; also in Minneapolis and Woodbury, Minnesota.
