= Joseph Cranston (actor) =

American actor and producer (1924–2014)

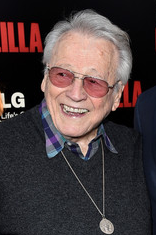
- Cranston in 2014
- Born: Joseph Louis Cranston; July 29, 1924; Chicago, Illinois, U.S.
- Died: October 2, 2014 (aged 90); Los Angeles, California, U.S.
- Other name: Joe Cranston
- Occupations: Actor, producer, screenwriter
- Years active: 1953–1988
- Notable work: Trauma (1962, producer); The Crawling Hand (1963, writer); The Corpse Grinders (1971, writer)
- Spouses: Angela Jeraldine Gordon-Forbes (m. 1946; div. 1951) Peggy Sell (m. 1952; div. 1969) Anita Cynthia Stickney (m. 1971; died 1997)
- Children: 3, including Bryan
- Relatives: Taylor Dearden (granddaughter); Robin Dearden (daughter-in-law)

Joseph Louis Cranston (July 29, 1924 – October 2, 2014) was an American actor, producer, and screenwriter. He was the father of Bryan Cranston.

== Early life ==
Cranston was born Joseph Louis Cranston on July 29, 1924, in Chicago, Illinois, to Alice Rose (née Bower; 1902–1984) and Edward Bernard Cranston Sr. (1893–1960). He had an older brother, Edward Jr. (1923–2009), a younger sister Marguerite (1928–1991), and an older half-sister named Kathleen (1913–1930) from his father's first marriage.

Joseph Cranston's grandfather, James Daniel Cranston, was from Montreal. He also had Irish heritage and was named after his great-grandfather, Joseph Cranston.

== Career ==
Cranston began his career as a television actor on several programs, including Space Patrol and Dragnet. Cranston's first appearance as an actor on film was an uncredited role in the film Beginning of the End in 1957. On March 9, 1971, Cranston formed Joseph Cranston Productions, Inc., which was responsible for presenting the 7th Annual Academy of Country and Western Music Awards in 1972.

== Personal life ==
Cranston married his first wife, Angela Jeraldine Gordon-Forbes in 1946 and they divorced in 1951. Cranston married his second wife, actress Peggy Sell in 1952. They had three children, including actors Kyle Cranston, who was born in June 1953 and Bryan Cranston, who was born in March 1956.

In 1968, after having trouble keeping steady work, Cranston temporarily left show business, a decision that caused a severe break in his family's home life. This led to him separating from his second wife, Peggy Sell, and leaving his two sons, Bryan and Kyle, and his daughter, Amy, who were forced to live with their grandparents for some time due to Peggy's alcoholism. Cranston would not reconnect with his sons and daughter until 10 years later. They remained close until his death in 2014. Cranston was married to his third wife, Anita Cynthia Stickney from 1971 until her death in 1997.

His son Bryan Cranston said he based his portrayal of Breaking Bad's Walter White on his father.

== Death ==
Cranston died in Los Angeles, California of natural causes on October 2, 2014, at the age of 90.

== Filmography ==
=== Television ===
- Dragnet (1953)
- Space Patrol (1953)
- The Red Skelton Hour (1954)
- Life with Elizabeth (1954)
- Shower of Stars (1955)
- Annie Oakley (1956)
- Father Knows Best (1956)
- Highway Patrol (1956)
- The Gale Storm Show: Oh! Susanna (1957)
- Bronco (1960)
- General Electric Theater (1960)
- My Three Sons (1961)

=== Film ===
- Beginning of the End (1957, Actor)
- Go, Johnny, Go! (1959, Actor)
- Erotica (1961, Narrator)
- Trauma (1962, Producer)
- The Crawling Hand (1963, Producer)
- The Corpse Grinders (1971, Writer)
- The Big Turnaround (1988, Director)
