= The Clingers =

Rock-and-roll girl band

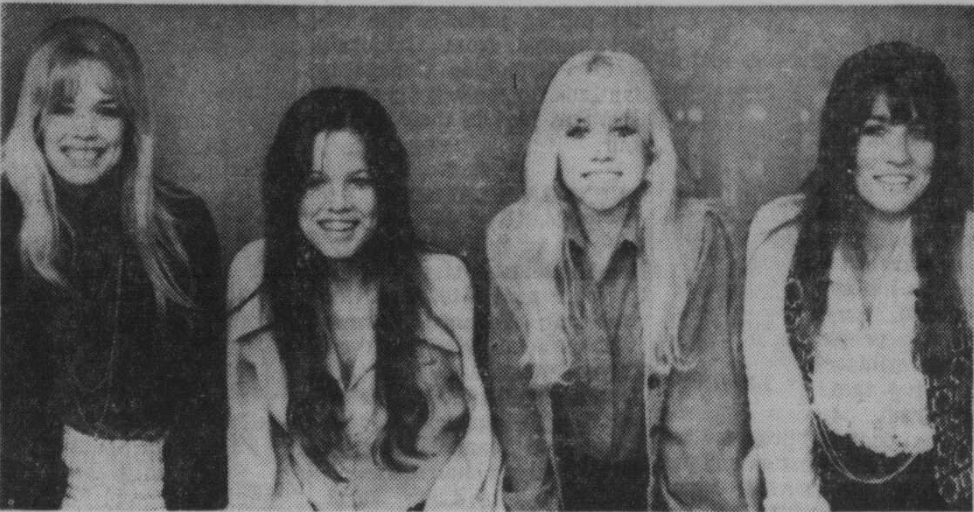
- The Clingers in 1969 (from left): Melody, Debra, Patsy, and Peggy

Background information
- Origin: Orem, Utah
- Genres: Barbershop music, Rock music
- Years active: 1966–1971
- Labels: Tollie Records, Columbia Records, Forward Records, MGM
- Past members: Melody Clinger; Peggy Clinger; Patsy Clinger; Debra Clinger

The Clingers was one of the first rock-and-roll girl bands. They started as a barbershop quartet and recorded five singles before transitioning to playing their own instruments in a rock band in 1966. The members consisted of the four Clinger sisters: Patsy (drums), Debra (bass), Melody (guitar) and Peggy (keyboard). They performed on many variety shows and with other artists to promote their music. Melody, the oldest of the sisters, was born in 1947 and sang duets with her mother before joining her sisters in a barbershop quartet, known as The Clinger Sisters, starting in 1956. Val Hicks became their vocal coach, and the family moved to California, where the Clinger Sisters appeared on The Andy Williams Show with the Osmonds and in several episodes of The Danny Kaye Show. They signed with Vee-Jay Records in 1964, recording three singles for them. They spent summers performing in fairs, headlining with Liberace and Donald O'Conner at the Great Allentown Fair. They released two singles independently in 1965.

Seeing the success of other rock bands at fairs, the Clinger sisters decided to switch from singing a cappella to accompanying themselves in a rock band. Nino Candido taught them how to play their instruments, and they started playing rock music alongside their quartet singing. They signed with Greengrass Productions, but didn't like the music the company wanted them to sing. They found better artistic synergy with Curt Boettcher and Steve Clark, who agreed to produce the Clingers' music for Greengrass Productions. They recorded several tracks that were never released.

In 1967, they opened for The Righteous Brothers and Robert Goulet in two separate tours. Melody started writing songs for them to perform, and met Dennis Wilson, who introduced her to Terry Melcher of Equinox records. Terry was the son of Doris Day and stepson of Marty Melcher. The Clingers signed with Equinox and recorded two singles for them, but did not record an album after Marty Melcher's death and subsequent discovery of his debts. In 1968, The Clingers signed with Columbia Records. They recorded the single "Gonna Have A Good Time" for Columbia, produced by Kim Fowley and Michael Lloyd. They made multiple appearances on The Smothers Brothers Comedy Hour where they promoted their single. In the summer of 1969, they performed for seven weeks at Rivera in Las Vegas with Ed Ames and Scoey Mitchell.

After seeing their Las Vegas act, Mike Curb started managing The Clingers and published their single "Something Here in My Heart"/"Blackbird" on the Forward label in July 1969. The single "Round Round Round", also recorded by the Clingers, was a result of Peggy's collaboration with Johnny Cymbal. In 1970, the Clingers opened for New Coconut Grove and Anthony Newley in Los Angeles and Las Vegas. The Clingers stopped performing in 1971, but the Clinger sisters continued to pursue music independently. Peggy acted as the singing voice for the Kitty Jo character in the Hanna-Barbera show Cattanooga Cats, and Peggy and Cymbal wrote songs together as the duo Cymbal & Clinger.

== Singing as the Clinger Sisters ==
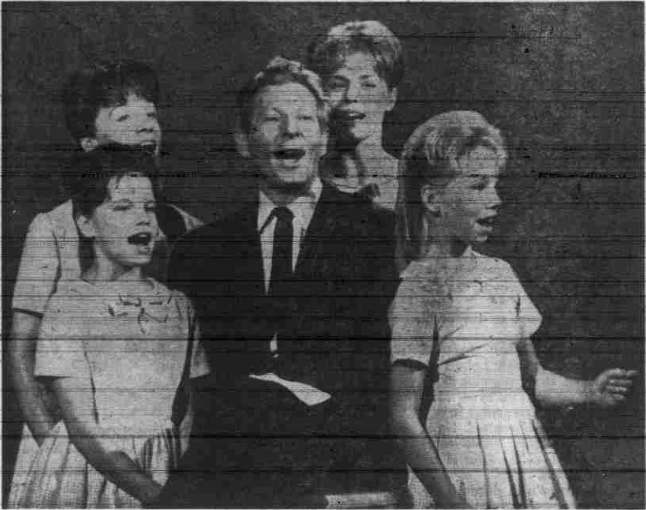
The Clinger sisters singing with Danny Kaye

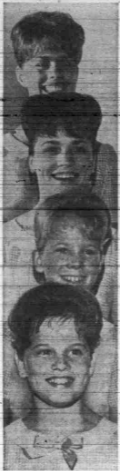
The Clinger sisters

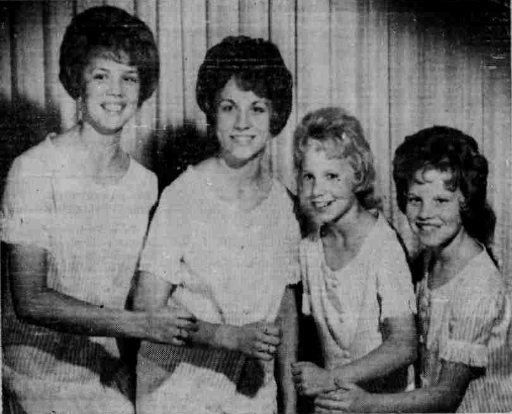
The Clinger Sisters in 1963

Melody Clinger, the oldest of nine children, showed an early talent for music when she harmonized with songs on the radio. Her mother started singing duets with her in the mid-1950s, and she sang with her sisters in church. The family were active members of the Church of Jesus Christ of Latter-day Saints. The four sisters first sang as a group at the Orem Farm Festival in Orem, Utah in 1956. They started singing at more local events in 1960 and 1961, including the Lai Cos Club Christmas party, a Brigham Young University Women's organization social, and a Harvest of Harmony concert. Val Hicks, who also coached the Osmond brothers, became their vocal coach. The local chapters of Sweet Adelines International and the Barbershop Harmony Society sponsored a benefit concert in 1962 to raise funds for the Clinger Sisters to attend a barbershop quartet competition in Kansas City. The Clingers performed alongside the Osmonds and other local groups.

The Clinger family moved to California to pursue the girls' music career. The four girls sang a cappella quartets together as The Clinger Sisters. They appeared with the Osmond Brothers on The Andy Williams Show, and were frequent guests on The Danny Kaye Show. Their vinyl debut was on a record with Danny Kaye in 1963, Danny Kaye With the Earl Brown Singers, the Clinger Sisters, and the Paul Weston Orchestra, on the tracks "Oh Baby Mine" and "The Story of Alice". The Clinger sisters signed with Vee-Jay Records in 1964 and released two singles with their imprint Tollie Records in 1964: "Shoop Shoop De Doop Rama Lama Ding Dong Yeah Yeah Yeah" and "Golly Mom". Cash Box called the song a "medium-paced rockin' teen romancer". They recorded the two songs and their B-sides in one session. They recorded another single, "What Can I Give Him" for a Christmas season release. The songs the Clingers recorded for Vee-Jay on the Tollie label had strong themes of adolescent romance. In the "Lipstick Song" the singer asserts that the right flavor of lipstick convinced a boy to kiss her. "Golly Mom" deals with seeking parental advice for an infatuation, while "Puppet" uses a marionette as a metaphor for feeling controlled by feelings of attraction.

The Clinger sisters appeared alongside the Beatles in TV Star Parade asking readers to vote for their favorite group in 1964. Patsy Clinger recalls that the Clingers won the contest. The Clinger sisters stopped recording with Vee-Jay; their father, Aaron, testified in hearings about Vee-Jay and payola. The Clinger sisters were signed with General Artists Corporation to book their tours, and they spent summers performing at grandstands at various fairs. In August 1965, they headlined with Liberace and Donald O'Conner at the Great Allentown Fair. By 1966, they had appeared on shows with Steve Allen, Mike Douglas, and Tennessee Ernie Ford.

Lynn Bryson, a radio DJ, wrote three songs for the Clinger Sisters: "How About Him," "Lean Back Baby," and "Children Laughing." The sisters arranged the songs for their voices. They also arranged a cover of "Bread and Butter" by the Newbeats. Bryson produced the recordings made with the Clinger Sisters and members of the Dartells. Aaron Clinger released the singles from these sessions independently under the label "Jo-Bee" records in August 1965. The singles were not very successful.

== Rock band ==
=== Transitioning to rock music ===
The girls wanted to play instruments in a rock band, and their father, Aaron Clinger, relented after seeing the popularity of a garage band from Hollywood at fairgrounds in El Centro, California. Aaron used money from selling their Utah home to buy guitars, a drum set, and a keyboard for the Clinger sisters. Nino Candido, son of Candy Candido, taught the girls how to play soul, funk, and rock music. They gradually started to incorporate their rock music into their acts when it made sense for the gig. They played at the Oregon State Fair on September 3, 1966. While they were rehearsing at their hotel, The Yardbirds heard them and insisted that they play at the Teenage Fair they were performing at. Debra recalled that after their October 16, 1966 performance at the Future Farmers of America, fans were "hanging banners out of their hotel windows screaming for us". Seymour Heller, their manager at the time, got them a record deal with Ed Cobb at Greengrass Productions. Debra recalled disliking the songs that Greengrass Productions wanted them to sing. Also in 1966, the Clingers met another band of sisters, The Pleasure Seekers (featuring Suzi Quatro).

Steve Clark, the Clingers's producer from their Vee-Jay days, had co-created with Curt Boettcher a new label called Our Productions. Clark introduced Boettcher to the girls. Boettcher liked their music and the girls liked working with him. Boettcher and Clark agreed to produce the Clingers albums for Greengrass productions. Boettcher and his bandmates from the Ballroom, Sandy Salisbury and Jim Bell, were frequent visitors to the Clinger home. Melody started dating Jim Bell. They often visited the large house that Boettcher lived in with other musicians who were "flower children". They played the band parts and sang backup vocals for Lee Mallory for some of his performances at the Ice House in Pasedena. They recorded "Sing to Me" by Lee Mallory, and "Don't Say No" and "Ringing Bells" by Ruthann Friedman. The tracks were never released. In December 1966, the Clingers performed multiple shows with Brenton Wood and Gladys Knight & the Pips at Disneyland. They performed with Bob Hope at the Arizona State Fair. They appeared on The Dating Game twice in 1967 and once in March 1969.

=== Performing as The Clingers ===
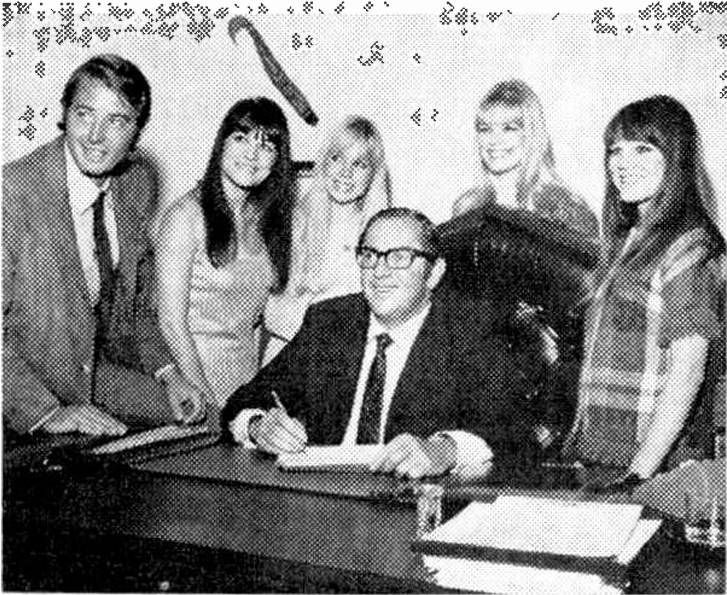
The Clingers sign with Equinox Records

The girls decided to call themselves The Clingers. Their agent was Jerry Perenchio. In 1967, they toured with The Righteous Brothers, performing at college campuses and military and air force bases. They opened for Robert Goulet on tour, but as a barbershop quartet. The orchestra director, Ralph Sharon, made an arrangement of Melody's "Only You". Sharon wrote an arrangement of "Walk On By" for the girls. In 1967, the girls entertained several famous musicians in their home, including Dennis Wilson, Craig Smith, and Jim Pike. Melody met Dennis Wilson after wolf-whistling his Rolls-Royce on her way home from a guitar lesson. Through their association with Dennis Wilson, they met Terry Melcher, the stepson of Marty Melcher. Terry Melcher and his friend Bruce Johnston started Equinox records, and the Clingers signed with them in late 1967 for records and agreed to produce movies with Marty. They rehearsed in Terry Melcher's home, which was later the site of the Manson murders. Melcher and Johnson produced "Come, Love", "Marcus", "Loneliness", and "Quick, Close the Door Before They Find Us". They planned for "Quick, Close the Door Before They Find Us" to be the title track of their album, but after Marty's death and the subsequent discovery of the poor state of his finances, the album deal was dropped. After Jerry Perenchio, Art Linson and Jeff Cooper became their managers, and they signed with the William Morris Agency.

In 1968 they signed with Columbia Records and Mr. Bones Productions. Toxey French and Jeff Comanor were their producers. In a later interview, Patsy said that she didn't like working with French, because he wouldn't let them play their own instruments. Melody wanted the group to sing her songs, and felt that French and Comanor's song selections were boring. In an attempt to separate Melody from her boyfriend, Jim Bell, Aaron Clinger moved the family to Northridge, California and told Melody to dump Bell. Melody, then 22, moved out of the house and lived with her friends. The Clingers started to work with Michael Lloyd and Kim Fowley.

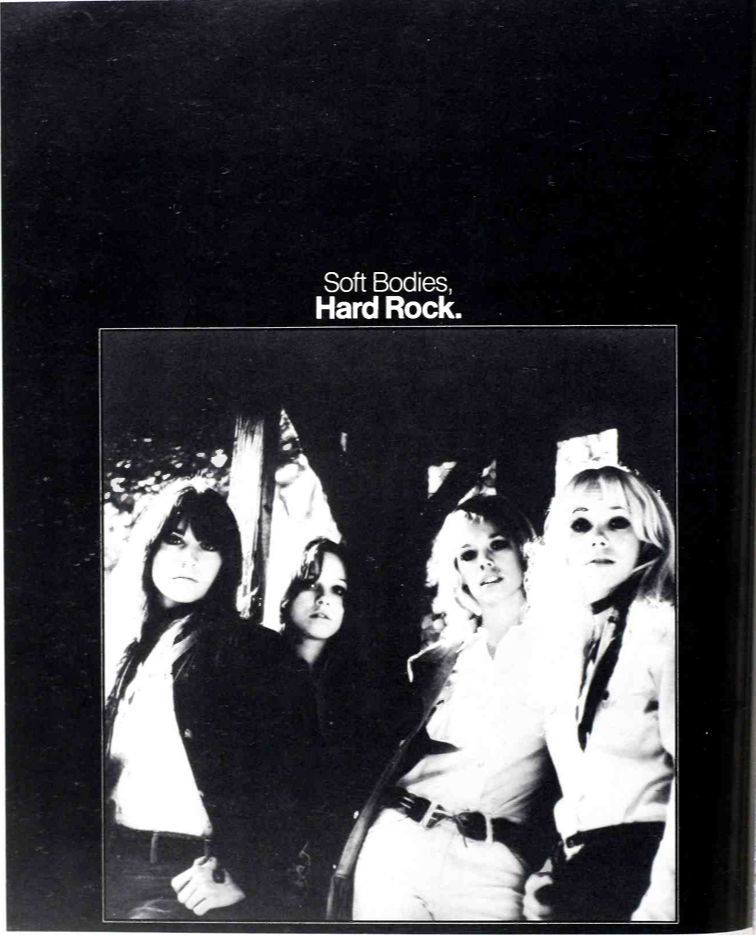
Clingers advertisement from Cashbox to promote "Gonna Have a Good Time"

On November 3, 1968, The Clingers made their first appearance on The Smothers Brothers Comedy Hour. They sang "This Moment of Softness" but they were not allowed to play their instruments. When they performed "Gonna Have a Good Time" on the January 16, 1969 show, they played their instruments. Playing their own instruments was a point of pride for the band, and advertising for the subsequent single stated "That's them on all the instruments". Cash Box reviewed "Gonna Have a Good Time", describing it as "displaying the unconstrained rock ability and young fervor that ought to bring an instant teen explosion". In 1969, there were plans for The Clingers to be the summer replacement hosts for Tom and Dick Smothers, but they were cancelled when CBS dropped the show because of its often-censored political content. That summer, The Clingers performed for seven weeks at Rivera in Las Vegas with Ed Ames and Scoey Mitchell. Mike Curb started managing The Clingers in 1969 after seeing their Las Vegas act. Under the Forward label, Curb published The Clingers's single "Something Here in My Heart" with "Blackbird" as the B-side in July 1969. The band appeared on American Bandstand in August 1969. They performed "Something Here in my Heart" on The Glen Campbell Goodtime Hour. They also appeared on Operation: Entertainment, the Pat Boone Show, and the Barbara McNair Show. The Clingers appeared in an issue of Vogue as models for popular clothing in 1969 alongside other women artists Cher and Gracie Slick.

After Melody married Jim Bell, they moved to Colorado and Melody did not perform with the Clingers much after 1969. Peggy acted as the singing voice for the Kitty Jo character in the Hanna-Barbera show Cattanooga Cats. Peggy, Debra and Michael Lloyd co-wrote "Mother May I" for the show, which was released as a single by Forward and appeared on the Cattanooga Cats LP. Peggy met Johnny Cymbal at a recording session where she sang his song "Sarah Jane (I'm All Alone)". The two started dating and collaborating on songwriting. They wrote several songs on the Cattanooga Cats show. The Clingers performed "Round Round Round" backed with "Mean it", which were both written by Peggy and Cymbal. The "Round Round Round" single was not successful. Cash Box called it a "rousing rock outing". Debra recorded two singles with Mike Curb as a duo around 1969. In 1970, Mike Curb got the whole Clinger family to be on The Mike Curb Congregation, a group of entertainers managed by Curb that performed for television variety specials. The Clingers opened for New Coconut Grove and Anthony Newley at the Ambassador Hotel in Los Angeles and for Newley at Caesar's Palace in Las Vegas in 1970.

== Musical work after The Clingers ==
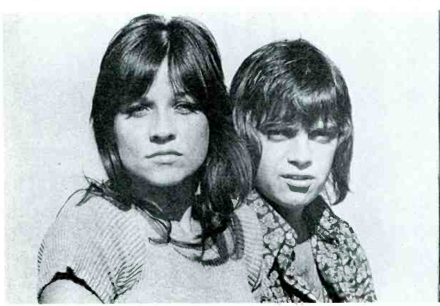
Cymbal & Clinger

By 1971, The Clingers were no longer performing together. Cymbal and Peggy were engaged until Cymbal told her that he was already married. Peggy wanted their relationship to continue and moved in with Cymbal, who was an alcoholic. They had an on-again, off-again relationship. Peggy and Cymbal released a single, "The Mookie Mookie Man", under their duo name Cymbal & Clinger. In 1971, Wes Farrell hired them as resident writers for Chelsea Records. A number of songs by Cymbal & Clinger were successful with popular performers. The Partridge Family sang five of their songs. David Cassidy ("Rock Me, Baby") and Donny Osmond ("Standin' in the Need of Love") also sang songs written by Peggy and Cymbal. Cher sang Peggy's "I Hate to Sleep Alone". Peggy Clinger died of a drug overdose on August 9, 1975.

Debra recorded two albums with the Mattel toy tie-in group called Rock Flowers. Rock Flowers performed several songs written by Cymbal & Clinger. They also opened for Tom Jones and sang as his backup singers. Patsy collaborated with Shannon O'Neill on songwriting and made their own duo called O'Neill and Clinger. Debra and Peggy sang backup vocals on Don Everly's 1971 album. Debra and Patsy sang backup on a Helen Reddy record and Debra sang backup on a Barbra Streisand album. Patsy played drums on Bill Cowsill's Nervous Breakthrough. In 1975, the Clinger family appeared in a San Jose production of the musical Saturday's Warrior. Debra appeared as Superchick in the manufactured band Kaptain Kool and the Kongs on The Krofft Supershow, which ran for two seasons from September 1976 to September 1978. Songs performed on the TV show were credited to The Osmonds. In 1978, a self-titled LP was released on Epic, produced by John Madara and Gino Cunico.

Patsy, Debra, and Leesa performed as The Clingers and worked with producers John Madera, Al McKay, and Phil Kelsey. They recorded an unreleased pop album in the 1980s. They self-produced The Fountain (1990), an album of Christian pop songs by Patsy.

== Legacy ==
Kim Fowley stated that the Clingers were globally, the first group of girls under 18 who played their own instruments in a rock-and-roll band. Fowley was the producer of another all-girl rock-and-roll band, The Runaways. Debra clarified that they were the first girl band to have a record contract. According to performing arts librarian Myrna Layton, the Clingers's performances were "completely dominated by the men who chose and orchestrated the songs and oversaw recordings and live shows" because of how the popular music industry in the United States was mostly controlled by men at the time. According to Debra Clinger, being an all-girl band was not an asset: "Though we were produced by some of the top names in the record industry and signed to some of the top record labels, we couldn’t break through the glass ceiling".

The Clingers released a vinyl album and compilation CD, Soft Bodies, Hard Rock through a successful Kickstarter campaign. The CDs were distributed by area251records, a reissue label. In 2022, Brigham Young University included The Clingers in an exhibit entitled Provo Pop Music Connections, which details 100 years of Provo music history. A story about the band was also featured in the Fall 2022 issue of Provo Music Magazine.

== Members ==
- Melody Clinger - guitar, vocals
- Peggy Clinger - keyboard, vocals
- Patsy Clinger - drums, vocals
- Debra Clinger - bass, vocals

== Discography ==
=== Singles as The Clinger Sisters ===
Title (A-side/B-side)	Year	Label	Producer
"Shoop Shoop de Doop Rama Lama Ding Dong Yeah Yeah Yeah" / "The Lipstick Song"	1964	Tollie Records	
"Golly Mom" / "Puppet"	1964	Tollie Records	
"What Can I Give Him" / "Jingle Dingle Do"	1964	Tollie Records	Bill Marx
"How About Him" / "Lean Back Baby"	1965	independently released	Lynn Bryson
"Children Laughing" / "Bread and Butter"	1965	independently released	Lynn Bryson
"Walk on By" / "Why Do We Hurt the One We Love"	1967	Hollywood Gold Star - FCA Agency Gold Star Studios? (Discogs says unreleased)	The Clingers

=== Singles as The Clingers ===
Title (A-side/B-side)	Year	Label	Producer (A-side/B-side)
"Gonna Have A Good Time" / "And Now You Know Me"	1968	Columbia Single	Toxey French & Jeffrey Comanor/Michael Lloyd & Kim Fowley
"Something Here in my Heart" / "Blackbird"	1969	Forward Records	Michael Lloyd & Mark Curb/Michael Lloyd
"Round Round Round" / "Mean It"	1970	MGM	Peggy Clinger & Johnny Cymbal

=== Appears on ===
Title	Year	Label	Producer
"Oh, Baby Mine" and "The Story of Alice" on Danny Kaye: With the Earl Brown Singers, the Clinger Sisters, and the Paul Weston Orchestra	1963	Dena Pictures, Inc.	
"Come to Me" on Music by Mason Williams	1969	Warner Bros (Clinger Sisters Courtesy of Columbia Records)	Dick Glasser

=== Peggy Clinger ===
==== with The Cattanooga Cats ====
Title (A-side/B-side)	Year	Label
"Mother May I" / "Johnny Jump Up"	1969	Forward
Cattanooga Cats LP "Mother May I"	1969	Forward

==== with Cymbal & Clinger ====
Title (A-side/B-side)	Year	Label
"The Mookie Mookie Man" / "The Pool Shooter"	1971	Marina
"The Dying River" / "A Little Bit No, A Little Bit Yes"	1972	Chelsea
"God Bless You Rock 'N Roll" / "Forever and Ever"	1972	Chelsea

==== as Peggy Clinger ====
Title (A-side/B-side)	Year	Label
Cymbal & Clinger	1972	Chelsea
"I Hate to Sleep Alone"	1973	Chelsea

=== Debra Clinger ===
==== with the Rock Flowers ====
Title (A-side/B-side)	Year	Label
"Number Wonderful" / "Mother You, Smother You"	1971	Wheel
"You Shouldn't Have Set My Soul On Fire" / "Sunday Dreaming"	1971	Wheel
"See No Evil" / "Image of You"	1972	Wheel
"Double Scoop" / "Don't You Ever Give Up On Me Baby"	1972	Wheel
"Put a Little Love Away" / "Always Call Me Up When You're Lonely"	1973	Wheel
Rock Flowers	1971	Wheel
Naturally	1972	Wheel

==== with Kaptain Kool and the Kongs ====
Title	Year	Label
Kaptain Kool and the Kongs	1978	Epic

=== Patsy Clinger ===
==== with Bill Cowsill ====
Title	Year	Label
Nervous Breakthrough	1971	MGM

== Sources cited ==
- Stax, Mike (2015). "The Clingers: Innocence and Magic". Ugly Things (39).
- Layton, Myrna (2022). "The Clingers: From Girl Group to Rock and Roll Band". Journal of the International Alliance for Women in Music. 28 (3).
