= Jeff MacKay =

American actor (1948–2008)

- Born: Jeffery Neill MacKay; October 20, 1948; Dallas, Texas, United States
- Died: August 22, 2008 (aged 59); Tulsa, Oklahoma, United States
- Occupation: Actor
- Years active: 1974–2008

Jeffery Neill MacKay (October 20, 1948 – August 22, 2008) was an American character actor. MacKay was born in Dallas, Texas.

== Career ==
MacKay played Gordie Masterson, one of the shrunken protagonists, on the fantasy adventure series Dr. Shrinker, a segment of the Saturday morning children's TV show The Krofft Supershow.

He may be best remembered as Magnum's friend Mac on Magnum, P.I., but he was also featured in recurring roles in Baa Baa Black Sheep, as First Lieutenant Donald "Don" French, JAG, Battlestar Galactica, Airwolf, The Greatest American Hero and Tales of the Gold Monkey. He also voiced Fireflight in Transformers.

== Death ==
MacKay died of liver failure on August 22, 2008, in Tulsa, Oklahoma, aged 59.

== Partial filmography ==
- Hot Summer in Barefoot County (1974) – Culley Joe
- Axe (1974) – Radio and Television Shows (voice)
- The Brass Ring (1975) – Teddy
- All the President's Men (1976) – Reporter
- Dr. Shrinker (1976–1977, TV Series) – Gordie Masterson
- Baa Baa Black Sheep (1976–1978, TV series) – 1st Lt. Donald French
- Battlestar Galactica (1978–1979, TV Series) – CPI Komma / 2nd Crewman
- Tales of the Gold Monkey (1982–1983, TV Series) – Corky
- Airwolf (1984, TV series) – Sgt. Willie Nash – S1.E11 "To Snare a Wolf"
- Songwriter (1984) – Hogan
- Airwolf (1984, TV Series) – Buddy – S2.E1 "Sweet Britches"
- Hardcastle and McCormick (1985, TV Series) – Nick Farrell – S2.E21 "The Game You Learn from Your Father"
- Magnum, P.I. (1980–1988, TV Series) – Lieutenant McReynolds / Jim 'Mac' Bonnick / Ski / TV News Reporter (voice, uncredited)
- Frame Up (1991) – Bob Sprague
- Frame-Up II: The Cover-Up (1992) – Deputy Bob Sprague
- JAG (1995–2005, TV Series) – Master Chief Petty Officer 'Big Bud' Roberts, Sr., USN
- December (2010) – Larry Carter (final film role)
