= David Levy (psychologist) =

American actor and psychologist

- Occupations: Psychologist, professor, author, stage director, actor

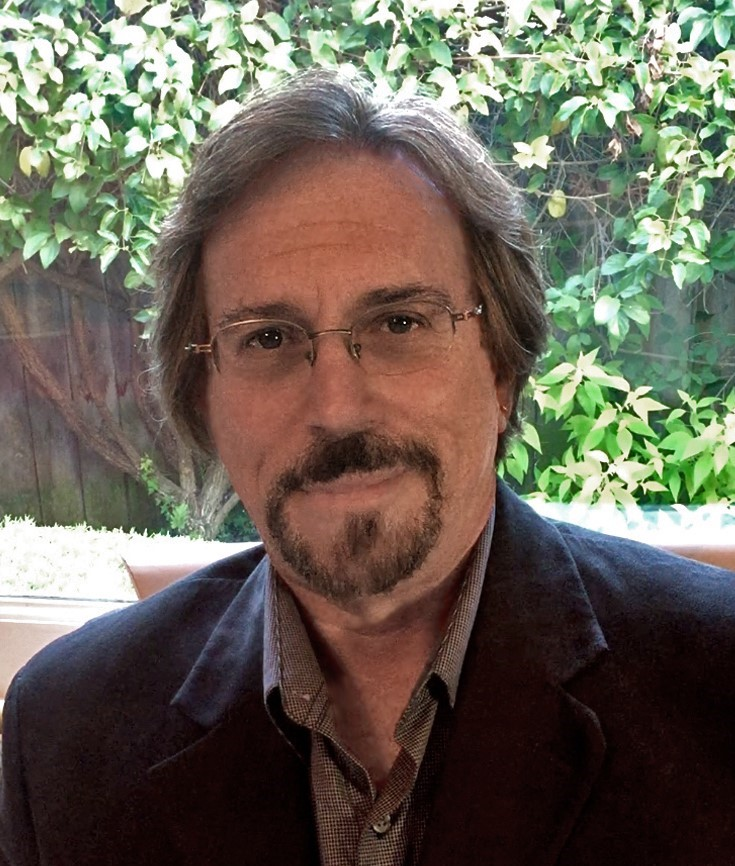
David Levy Profile Photo

David Levy is an American psychologist, professor, author, stage director, and actor. He is a professor of psychology at the Graduate School of Education and Psychology of Pepperdine University, near Malibu, California. He has co-authored a textbook on cross-cultural psychology and critical thinking, and has appeared on radio and television.

== Education ==
Levy has a BA from the University of California, Los Angeles, where he won a Hugh O'Brian Acting Award. He has an MA from Pepperdine University, and a second MA and a PhD from the University of California, Los Angeles.

== Psychotherapist ==
Levy holds professional licenses both in psychology and in marriage and family therapy.

== Media consultant ==
Levy has appeared on television and radio programs to provide psychological perspectives on current events, examine issues and trends in the mental health field, and provide sport psychology analyses of the Los Angeles Lakers for the Los Angeles Times.

== Author ==
Levy has written numerous books including Shots of Wisdom: Laughing, Wincing, and Learning Through Life's Lessons, Tools of Critical Thinking: Metathoughts for Psychology,Cross-Cultural Psychology: Critical Thinking and Contemporary Applications (which was coauthored with Eric Shiraev), and Life Is a 4-Letter Word.

He is also the author of numerous satirical articles, including "The Emperor’s Postmodern Clothes: A Brief Guide to Deconstructing Academically Fashionable Phrases for the Uninitiated".

== Stage director ==
Levy co-created and directed the world premiere of Let's Call the Whole Thing Gershwin, which marked the first theatrical revue of the music and lyrics of George Gershwin and Ira Gershwin. Levy also directed the West Coast premiere of William Gibson’s Golda: A Partial Portrait, starring Liz Sheridan. He assisted Steve Allen in directing Seymour Glick is Alive But Sick (with Bill Maher), a satirical musical revue produced and written by Allen.

== Actor ==
Levy had a starring role in the children’s television series Wonderbug, for which he received an Emmy nomination in 1977. In 1992 Levy was a guest star on the series Cheers, where he portrayed the leader of Frasier’s “low self-esteem” therapy group. He accrued numerous other professional acting credits, including: The World's Greatest Lover (directed by Gene Wilder), Ziegfeld: The Man and His Women, and Little Vic.
