= Dr. Shrinker =

U.S. fantasy television series

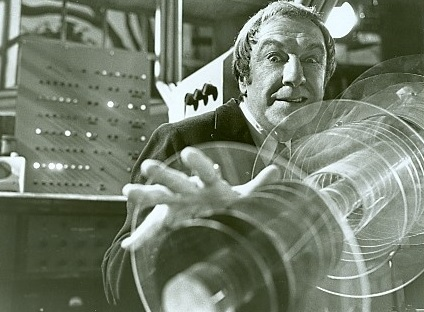
- Starring: Jay Robinson; Billy Barty; Ted Eccles; Susan Lawrence; Jeff MacKay
- Country of origin: United States
- No. of episodes: 16

Production
- Producer: Sid and Marty Krofft
- Running time: 15 minutes (per episode)
- Production companies: Sid and Marty Krofft Television Productions

Original release
- Network: ABC
- Release: September 11 – December 25, 1976

Dr. Shrinker is a segment during the first season of the ABC network's The Krofft Supershow in 1976.

== Plot ==
Dr. Shrinker (Jay Robinson) is a mad scientist who creates a shrinking ray that can miniaturize anything. Three teenagers — Brad Fulton (Ted Eccles), B.J. Masterson (Susan Lawrence) and her brother Gordie Masterson (Jeff MacKay) — crash land their airplane on an island. As they make their way to the only house on the island, they meet Dr. Shrinker and his assistant, Hugo (Billy Barty). Dr. Shrinker, in an effort to prove that his shrinking ray works, shrinks the three people down to 6 inches (15 cm) tall. The remainder of the series was different efforts by the 'Shrinkies' to return to normal size, while Dr. Shrinker and Hugo want to catch the trio so that they will have physical proof that the ray works for whatever world power wants to buy it. Dr. Shrinker also implied that he would give the unnamed buyer the Shrinkies as a free bonus. However, in one episode, Dr. Shrinker's plan was to sell the shrinking ray to the highest bidder, and the second highest bidder would receive the Shrinkies.

Each episode was basically the same. As Dr. Shrinker himself said in one episode..."I chase the Shrinkies. I catch the Shrinkies. The Shrinkies escape. It's a vicious cycle, and it's driving me mad!"

The concept may have been inspired by the 1940 film Dr. Cyclops in which a scientist working in the South American jungle uses his radiation experiments to shrink a group of fellow scientists to prevent them from discovering his secret work.

Dr. Shrinker lasted only one season on The Krofft Supershow. During the second season, it was dropped (as was the superhero segment Electra Woman and Dyna Girl). One episode, "Slowly I Turn", is available on DVD with the Krofft Box Set. In 2005, Marty Krofft said that he and his brother would be recording commentary for a DVD release of Dr. Shrinker.

== Cast ==
- Jay Robinson as Dr. Shrinker
- Billy Barty as Hugo, Dr. Shrinker's assistant
- Ted Eccles as Brad Fulton
- Susan Lawrence as B.J. Masterson
- Jeff MacKay as Gordie Masterson

== Episodes ==
| No. | Title | Directed by | Written by | Original release date |
|---|---|---|---|---|
| 1 | "Pardon Me, King Kong, But Is That You?" | Jack Regas | Si Rose | September 11, 1976 |
Dr. Shinker sends a monkey out to capture the Shrinkies and soon discovers the beast has no loyalty when the monkey helps the shrinkies escape.
| 2 | "The Other Brad" | Jack Regas | Ed Jurist | September 18, 1976 |
Dr. Shrinker captures Brad then replaces him with a robot duplicate programmed to lead B.J. and Gordie into a trap.
| 3 | "The Shake-Up" | Jack Regas | Don Boyle | September 25, 1976 |
The Shrinkies are captured after Dr. Shrinker's electro sismopilizer makes it impossible for them to hide underground. It also activates a volcano which Dr. Shrinker needs calming down.
| 4 | "Gordie's Bird" | Bob Lally | Si Rose | October 2, 1976 |
Gordie is captured by a bird who thinks he is her hatchling.
| 5 | "Dr. Shrinker Shrinks" | Jack Regas | Bernie Kahn | October 9, 1976 |
After Hugo deduces the reason the Dr. Shrinker has been unable to capture the Shrinkies is that he is too big, Dr. Shrinker uses the shrink ray on himself to deal with the Shrinkies at their own size.
| 6 | "The Sands Document: Part 1" | Jack Regas | Leo Rifkin | October 16, 1976 |
Brad, B.J. and Gordie have hopes of being rescued when a government agent washes up on shore; however, Dr. Shinker captures the man and learns he was in possession of an important nuclear defence system document.
| 7 | "The Sands Document: Part 2" | Jack Regas | Story by : Leo Rifkin; Teleplay by : Don Boyle | October 23, 1976 |
Things go to hell for our heroes.
| 8 | "Don't Hold Your Breath" | Jack Regas | Don Boyle | October 30, 1976 |
Dr. Shrinker gets more than he bargained for when he invents berries that give the Shrinkies the power of invisibility.
| 9 | "Slowly I Turn" | Jack Regas | Don Boyle | November 6, 1976 |
Gordie is returned to normal size with no memory of who he is, so Dr. Shrinker and Hugo convince him that he is Dr. Shrinker and that he must come up with a plan to capture Brad and B.J.
| 10 | "The Shrinkie Sale" | Jack Regas | Greg Strangis | November 13, 1976 |
After learning that Dr. Shrinker intends on selling his shrink ray to a master illusionist, the Shrinkies set out to convince the man he has been conned and that the ray does not work.
| 11 | "The Sacred Idol" | Unknown | Unknown | November 20, 1976 |
Utilizing a false idol, Dr. Shrinker tricks the island natives to do his bidding.
| 12 | "Brain Storm" | Bill Hobin | Don Boyle | November 27, 1976 |
Dr. Shrinker's latest invention gives Hugo superpowers.
| 13 | "Wildboy" | Jack Regas | Ed Jurist | December 4, 1976 |
The Shrinkies meet a native island boy.
| 14 | "Treasure of the Deep" | Bill Hobin | Ed Jurist | December 11, 1976 |
A pair of divers arrive on the island with a treasure chest, and they soon stumble upon the Shrinkies.
| 15 | "The Splotchalaria Epidemic" | Jack Regas | Si Rose | December 18, 1976 |
When Hugo breaks out with splotchalaria, the Shrinkies scour the island for wonga berries to cure him.
| 16 | "The Little Prince" | Unknown | Unknown | December 25, 1976 |
A young Chinese prince finds a traitor in his entourage soon after arriving on the island.
