= America's Four Gods =

2010 book by Paul Froese and Christopher Bader

- Author: Paul Froese, Christopher Bader
- Language: English
- Subject: God
- Publisher: Oxford University Press
- Publication date: 2010
- ISBN: 978-0-19-534147-8

America's Four Gods: What We Say About God -- & What That Says About Us is a book published in 2010, written by Baylor University professors Paul Froese and Christopher Bader. The book was based on a 2005 survey of religious views, which suggested that Americans' conceptions of God fall into four different classes. Further, they report, American's views on political, moral and scientific issues are usually tied to their conception of God.

The four different conceptions of God described in the book are the 'authoritative', 'benevolent', 'critical' and 'distant' God.

Individuals who conceive of an authoritative God and a benevolent God both see God as taking an interventionist role in believers' lives. They differ, however, in how they see God intervening. Those who conceive of an authoritative God imagine God intervenes to punish those who lapse from his rules, and are likely to be white males.

Those who conceive of a benevolent God imagine God intervenes to rescue and present alternatives, and are likely to be female.

Individuals who conceive of a critical God imagine he does not intervene in individuals' lives, but will judge them in an afterlife. Statistically black Americans are more likely to hold this conception.

Those who believe in a distant God imagine that God set the entire Universe in motion, but has no engagement with humanity at all. Americans who hold this conception are statistically likely to have completed more years of education than those in the other three groups.

In summary:

Conception of God	Perceived role of God	Typical believer
Authoritative	God intervenes to punish those who violate his rules	White males
Benevolent	God intervenes to rescue and offer options	Females
Critical	God does not intervene in lives, but judges in afterlife	Black Americans
Distant	God created Universe but does not engage with mankind	More educated

Father Patrick J. Howell, a Jesuit writing in The Seattle Times, noted that the four conceptions of God were represented by followers of Judaism, Buddhism, Catholicism, Protestantism and Islam. He also wrote:

Some would have us believe, Froese and Bader argue, that American society is engaged in a titanic struggle between "true believers" and the "godless." But the two authors note that only 5 percent are atheists, and they identify four, mostly contradictory, views of God as the source for the intractable social and political divisions among Americans.
