= Bigfoot and Wildboy =

- Created by: Joe Ruby; Ken Spears
- Starring: Ray Young; Joseph Butcher; Monika Ramirez; Ned Romero; Yvonne Regalado; Al Wyatt Jr.
- Country of origin: United States
- No. of episodes: 28

Production
- Producer: Sid and Marty Krofft
- Running time: 24 mins.

Original release
- Network: ABC
- Release: September 10, 1977 – August 18, 1979

Related
- The Krofft Supershow

Bigfoot and Wildboy is a live action children's television series on ABC. It began in 1977 as a part of The Krofft Supershow on Saturday mornings. Each episode was 15 minutes long, with cliffhanger endings resolved the following week. It became its own series in 1979 with twelve 30-minute episodes. There were a total of 28 episodes produced.

The series was heavily influenced by the two-part Bigfoot episodes of The Six Million Dollar Man, from the super-powered Bigfoot character to "bionic" sound effects used for Bigfoot running and leaping and the use of slow motion photography for action scenes such as throwing a giant object or uprooting a large metal fence post.

== Plot ==
Bigfoot finds a young boy lost in the vast wilderness of the Northwestern United States. Bigfoot raises the boy who becomes known as Wildboy. Now, eight years later, they fight crime and aliens who show up around their forest home.

== Cast ==
- Ray Young as Bigfoot
- Joseph Butcher as Wildboy
- Monika Ramirez as Susie (Season 1)
- Ned Romero as Ranger Lucas (Season 1)
- Yvonne Regalado as Cindy (Season 2)
- Al Wyatt Jr. as Cindy's dad (Season 2)

== Episodes ==
=== The Krofft Supershow (1977) ===
No.	Title	Original release date
K1	"The Sonic Projector, Parts 1 & 2"	September 10, 1977
K2	"Black Box, Parts 1 & 2"	1977
K3	"Abominable Snowman, Parts 1 & 2"	1977
K4	"UFO, Parts 1 & 2"	1977
K5	"White Wolf, Parts 1 & 2"	1977
With Christopher Knight.
K6	"Amazon Contest, Parts 1 & 2"	1977
K7	"Secret Monolith, Parts 1 & 2"	1977
K8	"The Trappers, Parts 1 & 2"	1977

=== Bigfoot and Wildboy (1979) ===
No.	Title	Original release date
B1	"The Secret Invasion"	June 2, 1979
B2	"Space Prisoner"	June 9, 1979
B3	"The Birth of a Titan"	June 16, 1979
B4	"Bigfoot vs. Wildboy"	June 23, 1979
B5	"Meteor Menace"	June 30, 1979
B6	"Earthquake"	July 7, 1979
B7	"Eye of the Mummy"	July 14, 1979
B8	"The Wild Girl"	July 21, 1979
B9	"The Other Bigfoot"	July 28, 1979
B10	"Return of the Vampire"	August 4, 1979
B11	"Outlaw Bigfoot"	August 11, 1979
With Sorrell Booke.
B12	"Spy from the Sky"	August 18, 1979

== Syndication ==
Cox Cable's "Retro Saturday Morning" aired the first eight two-part episodes of "Bigfoot and Wildboy" in 2003 and 2004 as part of the second season of the Krofft Supershow.

Amazon Prime is now airing (as of July 2024) The Krofft Supershow with this series and many others.

== Home media ==
Only two releases were available in the 1980s by Embassy Video, "Bigfoot and Wildboy Volume One" (with "The Secret Invasion" and "Space Prisoner") and "Bigfoot and Wildboy Volume Two" (with "Outlaw Bigfoot", "Eye of the Mummy" and "Birth of the Titan"). Both are now out of print. Columbia House released The World Of Sid and Marty Krofft series, which contained Bigfoot and Wildboy episodes. Rhino Video released a three-DVD collection also called The World Of Sid and Marty Krofft in 2002 included "The Return Of The Vampire" episode.
