= The Lost Saucer =

- Genre: Children's television series Adventure; Comedy; Comic science fiction
- Starring: Jim Nabors; Ruth Buzzi; Jarrod Johnson; Alice Playten and the Dorse
- Country of origin: United States
- No. of episodes: 16

Production
- Producer: Sid and Marty Krofft
- Running time: 25 minutes (per episode)
- Production company: Sid & Marty Krofft Television Productions

Original release
- Network: ABC
- Release: September 6 – December 20, 1975

The Lost Saucer is an ABC television series produced by Sid and Marty Krofft, starring Ruth Buzzi and Jim Nabors as hapless aliens who take a boy and his babysitter with them on their flying saucer. It aired new episodes from September to December 1975, with reruns continuing until December 1976, first under its own banner, then as part of The Krofft Supershow. It ran in daily syndication from 1978 to 1985 as part of the "Krofft Superstars" package with six other Krofft series.

== Premise ==
Fi (Ruth Buzzi) and Fum (Jim Nabors) are two friendly time-travelling androids from Planet ZR-3 and the year 2369 who land their flying saucer on present-day (1975) Earth. They good-naturedly invite a young boy Jerry (Jarrod Johnson) and his babysitter Alice (Alice Playten) to look in the interior of their spacecraft.

As onlookers begin to gather, though, the two androids become nervous about attracting attention and abruptly take off with Jerry and Alice. The flying saucer is able to travel through time, but the controls which allow the androids to specify an exact date are damaged, thus preventing the androids from returning Jerry and Alice to their rightful time and place.

The foursome encounter various adventures as the two androids (who bicker and argue incessantly with each other, neither seeming competent with the ship's controls) try to return Jerry and Alice home or to return to their own home on Planet ZR-3 where they hoped to make repairs with the help of their lookalike creators Doctor Locker (Nabors) and Professor Pringle. (Buzzi portrayed Pringle dressed as Buzzi's purse-wielding spinster character Gladys from Rowan & Martin's Laugh-In.) The adventures are usually set on Earth (or an Earth colony) either in the distant past or in the distant future hundreds (or even thousands) of years hence. Episodes often were blatant social commentaries dealing with extremes such as a world where names (and faces) were replaced with numbers, where machines were outlawed due to a global energy shortage, or a city where the population had grown lazy and obese because robots perform all physical work.

Accompanying the foursome was a creature known as the Dorse (played by Larry Larsen), a half-dog, half-horse hybrid with the body of a large shaggy dog and the head of a small horse.

== Themes ==
Each episode had a specific theme, usually a social or environmental one. "Fat Is Beautiful", for example, depicted a future in which people were grotesquely obese due to over-dependence on push-button conveniences, and leanness was in fact outlawed. In "Get a Dorse", two scientists kidnap the Dorse to use as a power source because the world's fuel supplies were finally used up.

== Episodes ==
There were 16 original episodes produced for the 1975–76 season. The first six episodes were later rerun in the first half of The Krofft Supershow's first season.

No.	Title	Original release date	Guest(s)
1	"894X2RY713, I Love You"	September 6, 1975	Edson Stroll, Duncan McLeod, Jerry Holland, Annmarie
Androids Fi and Fum from the planet ZR-3 in the year 2369 land their flying saucer on Earth and pick up Chicago-area Earthlings Jerry and his babysitter, Alice. To evade the police, they lift off. Alice is nervous about Jerry's parents' reaction if they are not at home, so they begin to land. Fum accidentally activates and damages the time vortex, and they are sent to an unknown time. While Fi and Fum work to repair the ship, Alice and Jerry venture outside and encounter aliens, all covered head to toe in costumes, and each marked with identifying numbers. Alice and Jerry are brought to a courtroom for the charges of having their faces showing, and for not wearing numbers. They are found guilty. Fi and Fum and their pet "Dorse" find the kids. Fi uses his electromagnetic beam to damage the judge. In the confusion, they lead Jerry and Alice out and back to the ship. As they escape in the ship, they reflect on a society where numbers are more important then people.
2	"The Tiny Years"	September 13, 1975	Gordon Jump, Joe E. Ross, Johnny Brown
Fi and Fum accidentally land in the year 2465. While they attempt to fix the ship's problem, Dorse playfully runs off, and Jerry goes in search of him. Each of them walks past a miniature person (played by Joe E. Ross) who uses a radio to report their presence. A small band of miniature people lash Jerry to the ground as he sleeps. When he wakes, they explain that they call themselves "Little Nicks," and that their scientists discovered a way to make the people smaller because "Biggies" were using up all of the planet's resources. Fi and Fum set out in search of water for the ship and encounter the Little Nicks' city and the mayor (played by Gordon Jump) who makes it clear that they should leave the planet. The Little Nicks confront Fi, Fum, and Alice at the saucer, but they will not leave without Jerry. Dorse locates Jerry and helps to free him, and then they return to the saucer. The mayor falls into a vent shaft, so Fi and Fum shrink themselves to rescue him. In gratitude, the Little Nicks provide water, while the mayor humorously falls into a small hole in the ground.
3	"My Fair Robot"	September 20, 1975	Richard Deacon, Jane Dulo, Jerry Holland, Walker Edmiston
Fi and Fum land the saucer after an asteroid strike. A robot named Goro approaches and asks for help, explaining that his owners want to have him recycled due to his clumsiness. Jerry and Fi visit Mr. and Mrs (Charlotte Rae?) Kroog, who demand the return of their robot, and they ask the local Sheriff Zork to help. Meanwile, Fum and Alice at the saucer work to improve Goro's skills. The sheriff arrives to retrieve Goro and bring him to the recycling center. Fi, Fum, Alice, Jerry, and Dorse arrive just in time to rescue Goro. They bring him to Mr. and Mrs. Kroog, who are impressed by Goro's improved abilities in speaking and to prepare and serve meals. They explain that they'll be very glad to have him back and will make his life happier.
4	"Transylvania 2300"	September 27, 1975	Stan Ross, Billy Barty
The saucer makes an emergency landing in year 2300, and Fi and Fum malfunction and shut down. Jerry stays with the ship while Alice and Dorse go into a stormy night to look for help. Meanwhile, in a castle, Dr. Frankenstein the 13th activates his newly constructed android, but it explodes and disappears. Alice arrives and asks him for help. He and his assistant Hugo visit the saucer and replace transistors, bringing Fi and Fum back to functionality. When everyone laughs at Dr. Frankenstein's request to take Fi and Fum with him, he returns to his castle and hatches a plan to alter their programming. Dr. Frankenstein visits the saucer and removes programming modules. He then remotely orders them to report to his castle, which they do. He fires Hugo, who helps Jerry and Alice to enter the castle. After Jerry and Alice are captured by Fi and Fum, Hugo sneaks in and replaces the androids' programming modules. Fi and Fum depart from the castle with Alice, Jerry, and Dorse, leaving Dr. Frankenstein strapped to his operating table, with Hugo demanding better treatment from him.
5	"Beautiful Downtown Atlantis"	October 4, 1975	Bob Gibbons, Bob Quarry
Attempting to land in Chicago, the saucer splashes into the ocean, and Alice spots an underwater city. Residents of the city welcome them to Atlantis, where the residents have sought refuge from the air pollution in the world above. The leader, Nepto, asks Fi and Fum for a tour of the ship, which he then claims ownership of. The kids get a tour of the city, but are imprisoned. Nepto prepares a broadcast from the saucer and demands that the androids perform on his show if they want the children to be safe. During their song and dance, Fi and Fum rust and cannot move. Dorse finds a key and releases Jerry and Alice, who watch Fi and Fum performing, and see them freeze up. As Fi and Fum are installed as statues, Jerry and Alice obtain some cod liver oil to unfreeze them. Fi uses a fishing pole and bait to lure Nepto away from the ship, and they are all able to escape.
6	"Where Did Everybody Go?"	October 11, 1975	Gil Green, Phil Leeds
The saucer occupants detect an SOS signal from the year 2112. After landing, they meet Keek, a man who disappears and reappears. Jerry touches Keek and both become invisible and can't be found. The androids can hear a city that must also be invisible. Fi, Fum, and Alice are soon teleported into an invisible place. The country's leader, Mr. Vroom, meets them there, and reveals his office. Guards arrest the androids and Alice, and place them in a cell where they find Keek. Keek explains how the invisibility works. Jerry reappears and finds Dorse. Mr. Vroom captures Jerry and threatens to imprison him with the others. Jerry uses Mr. Vroom's device to become invisible and escapes from him. The city becomes invisible, and Fi, Fum, and Keek break out of their cell. They find the saucer, and Keek decides to stay in his country. Mr. Vroom overhears the crew talking about his mistrust of foreigners. He changes his mind about being so distrustful, and restores the city back to its visible state.
7	"Get a Dorse"	October 18, 1975	Marvin Kaplan, Joe Ross, Vito Scotti
The saucer sets down in what is thought to be twentieth-century America. A broadcast by the president of the United States reveals that it is the beginning of the 24th century, and due to overconsumption of energy, the supply is running out, and all power-consuming devices are outlawed. As the crew prepare to depart, Dorse leaves the ship. Three scientists in the woods are experimenting with a water wheel and lamenting the loss of electricity. They meet Dorse and want to harness his "dorsepower." Alice and Jerry go out and find Dorse chained in place and walking on a treadmill to generate electricity. The scientists decide to keep Jerry and Alice as prisoners, afraid that they are spies who will report them to the government. Fi and Fum don disguises to search for the others. They encounter the scientists, who discover that they are androids. Fi and Fum run out of energy, and the scientists leave them in search of the saucer. The kids ask Dorse to walk on the treadmill to charge Fi and Fum, and then they all return to the saucer. Fum uses his electromagnetic beam to activate noises and actions inside the saucer that scare the scientists away. The crew all enter and launch.
8	"Androids Come Home"	October 25, 1975	Henry Beckman
Fi and Fum receive a radio signal from ZR3, their home planet, ordering them to return. Doctor Locker and Professor Pringle (played by Jim Nabors and Ruth Buzzi) greet them. The strict Commander Stickler orders Jerry and Alice taken into custody, while the androids are taken to the lab for a tune-up. Jerry and Alice arrive in a reception area and sit in lounge chairs to experience Dream-o-vision, which Alice really enjoy, and she considers remaining on the planet. Commander Stickler orders Fi and Fum to report to the agricultural collective farm for a new assignment. Fi, Fum, Dorse, Alice, and Jerry head back to the saucer, encouraged by Dr. Locker and Professor Pringle, while security staff attempt to stop them.
9	"Valley of the Chickaphants"	November 1, 1975	Jean Ross, Paul Wexler
Thinking that they have landed in the 1970s, Fi, Fum, and Alice set out to explore while Jerry and Dorse stay at the ship to be safe. Alice finds a very large wishbone and a stone-age tool. Jerry and Dorse spot some elephants with chicken heads, naming them chickaphants. Fum finds the buried top of a transport vehicle from their native 24th century. Jerry and Dorse run to be with the others, and they all run from a chickaphant and hide in a cave. A cave-dwelling man explains that androids began doing most of the work, while humans became lazy. Eventually, the sources of power failed, and people were unable to repair anything. Other cave-dwellers arrive and are angry at the androids. Fum accidentally activates some music, which distracts the cave-dwellers. Jerry, Alice, Dorse, and the androids escape the cave, but Fum briefly runs out of energy. The cave-dwellers surround them, but the group is scattered by the appearance of a chickaphant. The crew returns to the saucer and attempt to take off while the cave dwellers grab and shake the ship. Fi uses the ship's food synthesizer to create large peanuts, which are launched at the cave-dwellers and attract a chickaphant. Then the ship is able to take off.
10	"Return to the Valley of the Chickaphants"	November 8, 1975	Jerry Holland, Paul Wexler
The crew decide to land the saucer so that they can find some food. They find nuts and fruits and gather them, but soon realize that they have returned to where they saw chickaphants. They head back toward the saucer, but become lost. Dorse becomes separated and finds a large egg and rolls it into the saucer. The others are confronted by cave dwellers until a chickaphant scatters them all. The crew find the saucer and lift off. Dorse alerts the crew to the egg that he brought. The egg hatches and reveals a small elephant head on a chicken body, "the flip side of a chickaphant." They decide to land again and look for the baby's mother to return it. Fi and Fum set out to search, but Fi is captured by a cave dweller. Fi escapes, and Fum helps her recharge and escape. The mother chickaphant initially rejects the baby, but the crew sprinkle the baby with peanut oil to make it more appealing, and the mother accepts it. The crew take off in the saucer.
11	"The Laughing Years"	November 15, 1975	Wally Berns, Lisa Carol, Ross Durfee, John Timko
The ship hits a magnetic storm and loses control. Fi begins laughing uncontrollably. Fum makes an adjustment and stops her laughing, but then she cannot speak. They land the saucer, and the kids go outside to explore. A family arrives in a cart and sets up for a picnic with their "ionator" appliance. They laugh at everything that happens, bad or good. Alice and Jerry introduce themselves to the "Moot" family and learn that it is year 2180. Jerry and Alice arrive back at the ship just as Fum is able to make Fi speak again, but they soon learn that Fi is unable to laugh at all. Fi and Fum stay at the ship to repair her while Alice and Jerry join the Moots at their home for dinner. The Moot family continue their frequent laughing at home, where there is a wall-mounted ionator. Fi and Fum look for the Moot's home and are confronted by Agent Boomer of the Ionator Squad; Fi is in violation of the laughing law. Fum rewires her to laugh again, and the proceed to the Moot's house. Mr. Moot calls the authorities because Fi isn't laughing. Fi and Fum turn off the house ionator. Agent Boomer arrives and suddenly everyone has stopped laughing and is arguing. Dorse reactivates the ionator extra high, and people begin to laugh again. The crew decide to leave while everyone is laughing. They use and androids' boot jets to fly back to the saucer. They take off and Fum humorously pats Fi on the back and she begins crying uncontrollably.
12	"Fat Is Beautiful"	November 22, 1975	Mel Berger, Leonard Bremen, Jerry Holland, Paul Wexler
Dorse playfully hits the saucer controls, forcing a landing in the year 2077. Jerry, Alice, and Dorse explore and find "Fatropolis." A patrolling robot admonishes the children for cleaning up a broken flower pot, saying that it is forbidden for humans to do work. Governor Girth explains that robots do all of the work so that people can be fat, which is considered beautiful. Alice and Jerry are sent to a "fatorium" and ordered to gain 50 pounds (23 kg). The governor has a wrestling match against his friend Munch, which robots do on their behalf. Fi and Fum go to the governor in search of the kids. The governor is impressed by the androids and their many functions. He will allow them to leave only if Fum can defeat Munch's robot, Zonk, in a wrestling match. Fum malfunctions and chops Zonk, winning the match. In an argument after the battle, the men's recliner control panels are broken. Fi and Fum leave and find Jerry and Alice. The governor and his friend are seen jogging with tennis rackets, having discovered that exercise makes them feel good. The crew return to the saucer and leave.
13	"Planet of Lookalikes"	November 29, 1975	R. G. Brown
The saucer is out of control, and Space Way Patrol orders them to pull over. Argos 62 boards the ship and cites them for various charges. The officer pilots the saucer to Argos City, a city that floats in a bubble in space, and presents the crew to Judge Argos 19. They notice that officer, judge, lawyer, and guard all look alike. The androids are taken to President Argos, also a lookalike. He explains that the city is populated with decent law-abiding people, all duplicates of himself. The androids are brought to meet the doctor, who explains how the duplicates are made. The president expresses an interest in duplicating Fi, and Fum is ordered to leave. Fum uses a mask to disguise himself and return to rescue Fi. He releases her, but sets off an alarm. While escaping, Fum hides in the duplicator, and soon there are three Fums. The duplicator has been broken by duplicating Fum, leaving President Argus unable to make more duplicates. Fi tricks Fum into malfunctioning, proving that they have the real Fum, and they leave the planet.
14	"Fi Am Woman"	December 6, 1975	Carole Mallory, Bob Lussier
Fi, Fum, Jerry, Alice, and Dorse are playing football when Fum gets frustrated and flies around to do some recon of the area. When his jets fail, he crash-lands and hits his head, forgetting who he is. He walks and finds a solar power plant and meets a woman named Lyra, who reveals that she is an android who helps to run the place, and she longs to fly away. Fi flies in search of Fum and sets down beside the solar plant. She meets another technician, Blixx, who brings her inside where she sees Fum. Fum is still forgetful and leaves the plant with Lyra. Fi returns to the saucer, but Alice and Jerry report that Fum has come and gone. Blixx discovers Lyra packing a bag. Fi finds her and Fum walking toward the saucer and attempts to distract Fum by flirting with him, and then tells him stories from the past, hoping to jog his memory. Lyra sneakily turns off her power switch, and Fum and Lyra leave her behind, head to the saucer, and prepare to take off. Alice and Jerry search for Fum, and find Blixx at the power plant. Together they go looking for the others. They find Fi and power her back on. They all head toward the saucer, but watch as it flies away. On board, Lyra makes it clear that she doesn't really care for Fum and powers him off. Dorse escapes his room and pushes control buttons causing the saucer to land again. Blixx takes Lyra away to be re-programmed, while Fi flies with Fum, causes him to crash, and his memory is restored.
15	"Polka Dot Years"	December 13, 1975	Jack De Leon, Udana Power, Joe Ross
The trilithium power crystal burns out and the ship must land in the garden of a man named Mr. Moo in the 26th century. Mr. Moo and Ms. Ditto have colored dots on their faces, which Mr. Moo explains is how the government gives everyone the same color skin. The crew all head to the space ship repair shop and meet Mr. Dapple, who has a trilithium power crystal, but it will cost 400 UNEs (Universal Money Exchange.) Fi and Fum report to the Bureau of Employment, but cannot get jobs without dots on their faces. Mr. Moo tells them that they also owe 845 UNEs for damage to his garden. Alice paints dots on Fi and Fum's faces, and they get jobs in the solar bearing factory, then as delivery drivers, then as servants assigned to Mr. Moo's house. Fum clumsily knocks over Ms. Moo's stock ticker machine and breaks it, but is able to produce a ticker tape on his own. Mr. Moo makes an offer to buy Fum, which Fum accepts, and Ms. Ditto pays Fi. Mr. Moo orders Fi to leave in the saucer. She and Fum activate their crying circuits, which causes an overload, and Fum accidentally destroys Mr. Moo's stock-trading computers, making him unable to sell stocks as the market falls. Mr. Moo announces that he will sell the androids and the saucer for scrap. A call comes in, informing Mr. Moo that the market has reversed itself, and that by not selling, Mr. Moo has made a fortune. In gratitude, Mr. Moo allows Fum to leave with Fi and the saucer. As they lift off, they reflect on the problems that the skin dots cause, and that people should focus on what's inside.
16	"Land of the Talking Plants"	December 20, 1975	John Fiedler, Roy Stuart
Fi created some dinner in the food synthesizer, but burns a portion of it. They land the saucer to find a restaurant, but find an assortment of large fruit to eat. Fi and Fum go off in search of the main course, but meet Chlorophyll at the Plant Experiment Station. "Chloro" works with talking plants, but is impressed by the androids' ability to hear and understand the plants. A man named Mulch appears outside and clips some plant feeding wires. The androids return to the ship with gifted oversized fruits and vegetables. Mulch appears outside of the ship and lures Dorse away to another Plant Experiment Station and traps him there. Fi and Fum meet him at the station, and Mulch demands that they help him to replace Chloro as the chief botanist if they want to see Dorse again. He orders Fi and Fum to teach his plants to talk, but the plants are scared. One of the plants tells Fi and Fum where Dorse is hidden. Jerry and Alice go looking for the androids and meet Chloro. Mulch catches Fi and Fum as they try to release Dorse, and sprinkles them with fast-growing seeds; plants start to grow on their bodies. Jerry, Alice, and Chloro find Fi and Fum in the woods, paralyzed by the plants growing on them. Chloro sprays weed killer, which frees Fi and Fum. They warn Chloro that Mulch is trying to blow up Chloro's plant station. They find Mulch trapped by plant branches and then go to free Dorse. Chloro waves and tells them to "Seek love" as they take off in the saucer.
