= Sid and Marty Krofft =

Canadian-American puppeteers and television producers

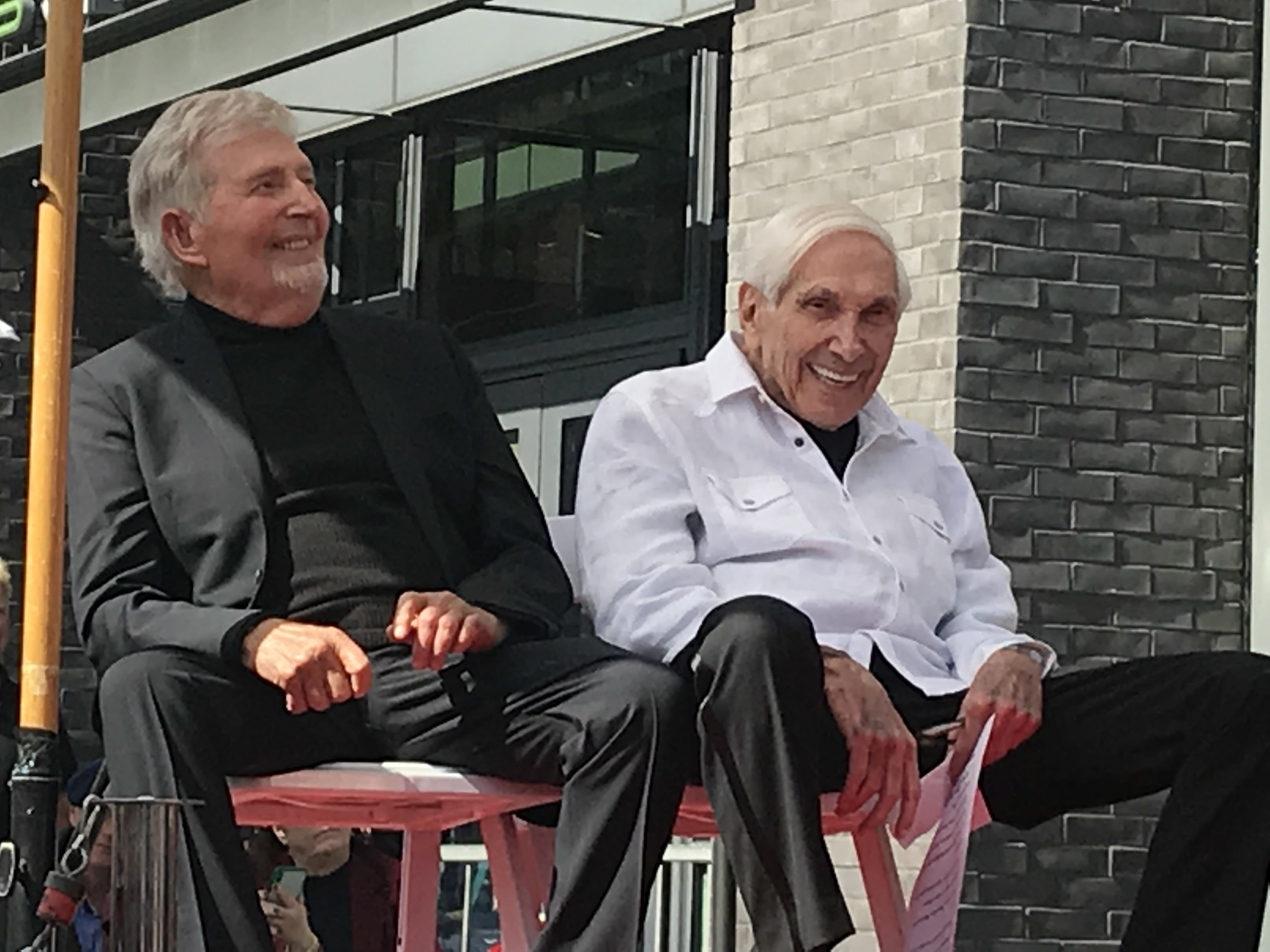
- Sid (left) and Marty (right) Krofft on the Hollywood Walk of Fame in 2020
- Other name: The Krofft Brothers
- Occupations: Television creators; television and film producers; writers; puppeteers
- Notable work: The Banana Splits Adventure Hour; H.R. Pufnstuf; Land of the Lost; Sigmund and the Sea Monsters
- Sid Krofft
- Birth name: Cydus Yolas
- Born: July 30, 1929; Montreal, Quebec, Canada
- Died: April 10, 2026 (aged 96); Los Angeles, California, US
- Marty Krofft
- Birth name: Moshopopoulos Yolas
- Born: April 9, 1937; Montreal, Quebec, Canada
- Died: November 25, 2023 (aged 86); Los Angeles, California, US
- Website: www.sidandmartykrofft.com

Cydus Yolas (July 30, 1929 – April 10, 2026) and Moshopopoulos Yolas (April 9, 1937 – November 25, 2023), known professionally as Sid and Marty Krofft or the Krofft Brothers, were a Canadian sibling team of television creators, writers, and puppeteers. Through their production company Sid & Marty Krofft Pictures, they made numerous children's television and variety show programs in the US, particularly in the 1970s, including H.R. Pufnstuf, Land of the Lost, and Sigmund and the Sea Monsters. Their fantasy programs often featured large-headed puppets, high-concept plots, and extensive use of low-budget special effects.

== Early years ==
The Krofft brothers were both born in Montreal, Quebec, Canada. Cydus Yolas was born on July 30, 1929, and Moshopopoulos Yolas was born on April 9, 1937. They were of Greek and Hungarian descent. For years, they said they were the fifth generation of puppeteers in their family; they said in 2008 that this story had been invented by a publicist in the 1940s. Their father Peter was a clock salesman who moved from Canada to Providence, Rhode Island, and then to New York City.

== Careers ==
=== Early years ===
Sid Krofft became a popular puppeteer who worked in vaudeville and was a featured player with the Ringling Bros. and Barnum & Bailey Circus. In the 1940s, Sid created a one-man puppet show regularly performed at burlesque shows as a teenager. A night club promoter from the Catskills was convinced by Sid to create a show he named from the name, Sydney Snitkovsk. Sid added an extra F due to its short length, making it "The Unusual Artistry of Sid Krofft", that began to be performed throughout the world. His father joined him on tour in Paris while Marty stayed in New York, where he began using his older brother's puppets to earn money by staging performances. By the 1950s, the Krofft brothers were working together. In 1957, they developed Les Poupées de Paris, a puppet show with more mature themes. One of their early exposures to a television audience was the premiere episode of The Dean Martin Show in 1965.

=== Television productions ===
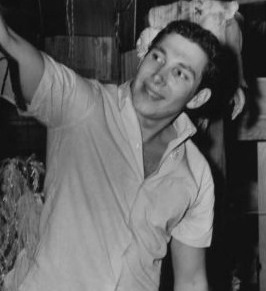
Marty Krofft in 1962

After designing the characters and sets for Hanna-Barbera's The Banana Splits (NBC, 1968–1970), the Kroffts' producing career began in 1969 with the landmark children's television series H.R. Pufnstuf. The series introduced the team's trademark style of large-scale, colourful design, puppetry, and special effects. Featuring a boy who has been lured into an alternate fantasy world and can never escape, the team also established a storytelling formula to which they would often return. Some people suggested that the Krofft brothers were influenced by marijuana and LSD (the portmanteau in the title H.R. Pufnstuf being considered by some to be a dead giveaway), although they always denied these claims. In a 2005 interview with USA Today, Marty Krofft said, "No drugs involved. You can't do drugs when you're making shows. Maybe after, but not during. We're bizarre, that's all." Referring to the alleged LSD use, Marty said in another interview, "That was our look, those were the colours, everything we did had vivid colours, but there was no acid involved. That scared me. I'm no goody two-shoes, but you can't create this stuff stoned."

The Kroffts favoured quirky superhero stories, often with children portraying the heroes or part of a hero team. Krofft productions include The Bugaloos (1970), Lidsville (1971), Sigmund and the Sea Monsters (1973–1975), Land of the Lost (1974–1976), The Lost Saucer (1975), Electra Woman and Dyna Girl (1976), and Wonderbug (1976–1978).

=== The World of Sid and Marty Krofft ===
In 1976, a developer asked the Kroffts to develop an indoor amusement park for the new Omni International complex in downtown Atlanta. The park, The World of Sid and Marty Krofft, closed after six months due to poor attendance. The Omni International building that contained it was renamed the CNN Center when the site was converted to the CNN headquarters.

=== Achievements ===
The Kroffts' children's programs have developed a wide and enduring following, especially among adults who watched the shows as children. They were also responsible for a large number of prime-time music and variety programs. These shows also tended to employ a reliable formula featuring a celebrity host or team of hosts, weekly celebrity guest performers, flashy and colourful sets, and frequent interludes of scripted banter and gag-driven, "corny", good-natured sketch comedy.

The Kroffts are often acknowledged for the vision and creativity of their projects. In addition to their colourful and hyper-kinetic programs, they often created children's shows with complex stories, unusual protagonists, and uniquely modern sensibilities, or with darker or more action-themed tones than most children's shows. Their "camp" popularity stems largely from their shows' low-budget production values, the often surrealistic feel of many of the programs, and the uniquely "70s" style of music and design.

=== Later years ===
The Kroffts occasionally departed from their formula while making new programs, such as on Pryor's Place (1984) and the political puppet satire show D.C. Follies (1987). They attempted to update some of their classic series for a younger generation, including new versions of Land of the Lost, Electra Woman and Dyna Girl, H.R. Pufnstuf, and Sigmund and the Sea Monsters. A new original series, Mutt & Stuff, aired on Nickelodeon from 2015 to 2017.

In May 2022, the Kroffts participated in the first Krofft Kon, a convention held in Orinda, California, where they were joined by some of the actors from their television series.

== Dispute ==
In January 2023, Sid sued Marty and the Krofft companies for allegedly being delinquent in paying nearly $500,000 owed to Sid as part of a buyout of his business interests.

== Personal lives and deaths ==
Marty died from kidney failure in Los Angeles, on November 25, 2023, at the age of 86.

Sid died in Los Angeles on April 10, 2026, at the age of 96.

== Honours and awards ==
Award	Ceremony	Organisation	Presenter	Year	Notes/References
Hollywood Walk of Fame: Television	Hollywood Walk of Fame	Hollywood Chamber of Commerce		2020	
Emmy Award: Lifetime Achievement Award	45th Annual Daytime Emmy Awards	National Academy of Television Arts and Sciences		2018	
TV Land Award: Pop Culture Award	7th Annual TV Land Awards	The TV Land Icon Awards	Will Ferrell	2009	
Saturn Award: Life Career Award	29th Saturn Awards	Academy of Science Fiction, Fantasy and Horror Films		2002	

== Works ==
=== TV series ===
- The Banana Splits (1968; characters created for Hanna-Barbera Productions)
- H.R. Pufnstuf (1969)
- The Bugaloos (1970)
- Lidsville (1971)
- Sigmund and the Sea Monsters (1973)
- Land of the Lost (1974)
- Far Out Space Nuts (1975)
- The Lost Saucer (1975)
- Donny & Marie (1976; a.k.a. The Osmond Family Show)
- The Krofft Supershow (1976)
  - Kaptain Kool and the Kongs (1976)
  - Dr. Shrinker (1976)
  - Electra Woman and Dyna Girl (1976)
  - Wonderbug (1976)
  - Magic Mongo (1977)
  - Bigfoot and Wildboy (1977)
- The Brady Bunch Hour (1977)
- The Krofft Superstar Hour (1978; a.k.a. The Bay City Rollers Show)
  - Horror Hotel
  - The Lost Island
- Pink Lady and Jeff (1980)
- Barbara Mandrell & the Mandrell Sisters (1980)
- Pryor's Place (1984)
- D.C. Follies (1987)
- Land of the Lost (1991)
- Mutt & Stuff (2015)
- Sigmund and the Sea Monsters (2016)

=== Television specials/pilots ===
- Fol-de-Rol (1972)
- The World of Sid & Marty Krofft at the Hollywood Bowl (1973)
- Prevue Revue (1974)
- Really Raquel (1974)
- Jimmy Osmond Presents ABC's Saturday Sneak Peek (1976)
- The Paul Lynde Halloween Special (1976) - Did not produce, but includes Witchiepoo and other Krofft regulars
- The Brady Bunch Variety Hour (1976)
- Kaptain Kool and the Kongs Present ABC All-Star Saturday (1977)
- The Bay City Rollers Meet the Saturday Superstars (1978)
- The Krofft Komedy Hour (1978)
- Bobby Vinton's Rock 'n' Rollers (1978)
- Anson & Lorrie (1981)
- Oral Roberts Celebration (1981)
- The CBS Saturday Morning Preview Special (1983)
- Saturday's the Place (1984)
- The Cracker Brothers (1985)
- Rock 'n' Wrestling Saturday Spectacular (1985)
- The Patti LaBelle Show (1985)
- Sid & Marty Krofft's Red Eye Express (1988)
- Krofft Late Night (1991)
- Electra Woman and Dyna Girl (2001, unaired pilot)
- Sigmund and the Sea Monsters (2017)

=== Direct-to-video ===
- Toby Terrier and His Video Pals (1993–1994) – Created to interact with an electronic toy manufactured by Tiger Electronics
- Wishing Well Willy (1995)

=== Films ===
- Pufnstuf (1970)
- Middle Age Crazy (1980)
- Side Show (1981)
- Harry Tracy, Desperado (1982)
- Land of the Lost (2009)

=== Live shows ===
- Howdy, Mr. Ice of 1950 (1949)
- Les Poupées de Paris (1961)
- Funny World (1966)
- Circus (1966)
- Kaleidoscope (1968)
- Fol-de-Rol (1968)
- A Broadway Baby (1984)
- Comedy Kings (1988)
- "Blast" (1991)

=== Web series ===
- Electra Woman and Dyna Girl (2016)
