= D.C. Follies =

- Genre: Comedy
- Created by: Sid & Marty Krofft
- Written by: Larry Arnstein; Wayne Kline; Bob Dolan Smith; John Debilis; Mike Kirchenbaum; E. Jeffrey Smith; Jeff Zimmer
- Directed by: Rick Locke
- Presented by: Fred Willard
- Starring: Maurice LaMarche; Joe Alaskey
- Country of origin: United States
- Original language: English
- No. of seasons: 2
- No. of episodes: 44

Production
- Producer: Sid & Marty Krofft
- Running time: 30 minutes
- Production companies: Sid & Marty Krofft Pictures; Negative Entertainment (1987–1988); Cannon Films (1988–1989)

Original release
- Network: Syndication
- Release: September 26, 1987 – September 1, 1989

D.C. Follies is a syndicated sitcom which aired from 1987 to 1989. The show was set in a Washington, D.C. bar, where a bartender played by Fred Willard would welcome puppet caricatures of politicians and popular culture figures.

== Synopsis ==
The show, a satire, made frequent sardonic comments on Cold War and late 1980s politics and pop culture. Although Willard was the only live actor appearing regularly, each episode featured a celebrity guest, such as Martin Mull, Robin Leach, Whoopi Goldberg, Leslie Nielsen, Bob Uecker, and Betty White. In one episode, Robert Englund showed up as his Freddy Krueger character, and in a special Christmas episode an un-billed actor played Santa Claus.

== Style ==
The show's use of puppets that mimicked popular culture and political figures was similar to the British series Spitting Image; it was produced by Sid and Marty Krofft, well-known puppeteers in the United States who were responsible for popular children's television shows including H.R. Pufnstuf and Sigmund and the Sea Monsters. The show was originally funded and syndicated nationally by New York-based Syndicast Services Inc.

== Frequently appearing puppet characters included ==
- Former Presidents Richard Nixon, Gerald Ford, Jimmy Carter, and then-President Ronald Reagan and Vice-president George H. W. Bush. When Bush was elected president in 1988, Vice-president Dan Quayle also became a regular. The former and current presidents were portrayed as having a special Presidents' Table at the bar, where they sat together.
- First Ladies Nancy Reagan, Barbara Bush; and Second Lady Marilyn Quayle.
- Woody Allen
- Jim Bakker and his then-wife, Tammy Faye Bakker
- Cher
- Sam Donaldson
- Senator Robert Dole
- Governor Michael Dukakis
- Whoopi Goldberg
- Katharine Hepburn
- Rev. Jesse Jackson
- Michael Jackson
- Don King
- Henry Kissinger
- Ted Koppel
- Madonna
- Sean Penn
- Edwin Meese
- Oliver North
- Tip O'Neill
- Dolly Parton
- John Poindexter
- Dan Rather
- Fred Rogers
- Andy Rooney
- Geraldo Rivera
- Pat Robertson
- Sylvester Stallone
- Oprah Winfrey
- British Prime Minister Margaret Thatcher, and Queen Elizabeth II
- Prince Charles and his then-wife, Princess Diana
- Soviet leader Mikhail Gorbachev and wife Raisa Gorbacheva
- Pope John Paul II
- Iranian leader Ayatollah Khomeni
- Sid and Marty Krofft themselves, as newspaper vendors

== Accolades ==
The series was nominated for two Emmy Awards.

== Home media ==
A series of three "Best of D. C. Follies" VHS tapes were released, with each volume containing two episodes.

On August 4, 2017, Shout! Factory announced they had acquired the rights to the series and subsequently released D.C. Follies – The Complete Series on DVD in Region 1 on November 14, 2017.

The show has been made available via video on demand at Amazon Video and iTunes.
