= Cha-Ka =

- Land of the Lost episode
- Will teaches Cha-Ka to drink from a canteen
- Episode no.: Season 1 Episode 1
- Directed by: Dennis Steinmetz
- Written by: David Gerrold
- Production code: B002B7G87Y
- Original air date: September 7, 1974

Episode chronology
← Previous —	Next → "The Sleestak God"

"Cha-Ka" is the first episode of the first season of the 1974 American television series Land of the Lost. Written by David Gerrold and directed by Dennis Steinmetz, it first aired in the United States on September 7, 1974, on NBC.

== Plot ==
An earthquake plunges Rick, Will, and Holly Marshall to the Land of the Lost while river-rafting. When their raft washes ashore, they are met with a tyrannosaur they soon dub "Grumpy", who chases them till they reach a homely cave located up a steep cliff.

The next day, the Marshalls explore the jungle, where they discover a large, metallic "pylon" which emits a high-pitched whirring sound and observe three manlike simians attempting to create a fire while chanting an invocation in their native language.

The creatures are interrupted in their ritual by Grumpy, who wounds the leg of the smallest of the creatures. Will carries him back to their hiding place, where they discover that the creature's name is Cha-Ka and that his people are called "Pakuni". They mend Cha-Ka's leg and share their dinner with him.

The next morning, Cha-Ka gives them a feast of native fruits. The Marshalls conclude that Cha-Ka has become their friend.

== Reception ==
The online review site Premium Hollywood described the episode in 2009 as "really a very boring start for the series", adding that it was likely toned down to avoid frightening its young viewership.

In Sid and Marty Krofft: A Critical Study of Saturday Morning Children's Television, 1969-1993, film and television historian Hal Erickson praises Land of the Lost for not revealing all the details of the show's premise in the first episode, instead spreading out plot revelations throughout the first season. In "Cha-ka", only the dinosaurs and Pakuni are revealed; later episodes would introduce the Sleestak and other elements of the program's mythology. Erickson contrasts this with "standard operating procedure in the 1970s ... to lay all the cards on the table in the opening episode", and lauds the show's creators Sid and Marty Krofft for "having enough confidence in [their] young audience to unfold [the] series' exposition over a matter of weeks rather than minutes".
