= Album (Land of the Lost) =

- Land of the Lost episode
- Rick (right) and the children face Rick's impostor (left) at the pit of the Sleestak god
- Episode no.: Season 1 Episode 7
- Directed by: Bob Lally
- Written by: Dick Morgan
- Original air date: October 19, 1974

Guest appearance
- Erica Hagen

Episode chronology
← Previous "The Stranger"	Next → "Skylons"

"Album" is the seventh episode of the first season of the 1974 American television series Land of the Lost. Written by Dick Morgan and directed by Bob Lally, it was first broadcast in the United States on October 19, 1974, on NBC. The episode guest stars Erica Hagen.

== Plot ==
Will awakens in the early morning to a high-pitched whirring sound which fills the jungle, but eventually it goes away, and only he can hear it. Holly sees that a creature has been breaking into their stores, so at Rick's suggestion she starts to build a trap and Will goes to weed the garden.

Outside, he again hears the sound and this time follows it to the Lost City, momentarily distracted by the city's ruling Allosaurus. Within, he enters a chamber with a matrix table filled with colored stones instead of crystals. On the ground is a pulsating blue crystal that attracts his attention. Picking it up, he sees his mother (Erica Hagen) materialize in a cloud of mist. Afterwards, he returns to High Bluff, but does not speak of his encounter.

The next day, Holly's trap has not worked and Will again hears the sound. Holly hears it briefly as well, but dismisses it. Will is then summoned by the emanation to the Lost City, but this time Holly follows him. In the chamber, Will again witnesses the image of his mother while holding a blue stone. His mother calls for him, but he is interrupted by Holly, who sees nothing until she touches the blue crystal as well. Holding it together, they are both beckoned by their mother to "come home", but then she quickly adds, "Too late. Come tomorrow. Don't tell." Will explains to Holly that he wants to tell Rick about his discovery, but for some reason he is unable to. Holly replies that she will tell their father if he does not and Will sincerely hopes that she can. Will theorizes that they were looking through a time doorway that is open to a period when she was still alive. When Holly asks why her image is not very clear, her brother suggests that it might be because they do not remember her very well. With that, the two siblings, clearly heartbroken, return to High Bluff together.

The next morning the trap has failed again, but both Will and Holly display utter disinterest, and when Rick pries into the issue, Will yells at him and leaves. He returns to apologize for snapping at Rick and while Rick says that he understands, he suspects something. The next evening, Will and Holly again hear the sound and are drawn to the Lost City. Rick secretly follows them. Inside, the phantom of their mother again beckons them, this time accompanied by their father, dressed in a suit. They follow him and he leads them deeper into the tunnels. As they walk, his appearance occasionally flickers to that of a Sleestak from the viewpoint of the audience.

Rick finds another pulsing blue crystal and sees an illusion of his children cheerfully asking them to follow them and see what they have discovered. However, Rick is not easily deceived and angrily smashes the crystal onto the floor and it explodes. Immediately, the image disappears and he sees a Sleestak in the tunnel that appeared to be one of the time doorways. Realizing that his children are in great danger, he destroys the false matrix and chases after the Sleestak. He finds his children being led to the Sleestak god, and takes the blue stone from them immediately breaking the hypnotic spell. Rick shatters the crystal, knocking one Sleestak into the pit and grapples with another finally tossing it in as well. They escape the city and return to High Bluff.

Rick surmises that the blue stones allow people to see what they love the most by exerting "some form of hypnosis". Holly dismantles her trap, saying it reminds her too much of the trap into which they were nearly caught.

== Reception ==
The online review site Premium Hollywood described "Album" in 2009 as a "tight installment" that shows how "twisted" the Sleestak can be.

The film historian Hal Erickson criticized the episode for its inconsistent explanation of the powers of the fourth dimensional nodes. According to Erickson, the episode probably inspired the episode "Dreammaker" from the 1991 series.
