= Zarn =

Zarn may refer to:

- Tim de Zarn (born 1952), American actor
- Zarn Sullivan (born 2000), New Zealand rugby player
- "The Zarn", an episode of Land of the Lost
  - The Zarn, a character in the television series Land of the Lost
- The Zarn family, characters from the 1997 TV film A Nightmare Come True; see Shelley Fabares
