= Skylons =

- Land of the Lost episode
- Episode no.: Season 1 Episode 8
- Directed by: Bob Lally
- Written by: Dick Morgan
- Original air date: October 26, 1974

Episode chronology
← Previous "Album"	Next → "The Hole"

"Skylons" is the eighth episode of the first season of the 1974 American television series Land of the Lost. Written by Dick Morgan and directed by Bob Lally, it first aired in the United States on October 26, 1974, on NBC.

== Plot ==
Will and Holly spy a clutch of pink, white, and blue chicken-like creatures and Will tries to catch them, but they are scared off by Holly, who screams after seeing diamond-shaped objects fly around the Pylon.

While signaling with mirrors to Rick, Will realizes the Pylon reacts to the light of his mirror, and together he and Holly head to investigate. On the way they witness Spot get eaten by Grumpy.

At the Pylon, Will flashes his mirror, causing a small pyramidal piece to fall off. When he picks it up, the piece turns out to be extremely heavy, and seems to have a magnetic aversion to being placed back onto the Pylon, but finally reattaches. A doorway appears in the Pylon, and inside can be seen glowing stones. Grumpy returns from having eaten Spot and chases the children into the Pylon. When he tries to bite it, the Pylon emits an electric shock that scares him away.

Rick goes in search of the children, but is forced to hide when he is pursued by Spike. Inside the Pylon, Holly and Will try touching the stones, which cause rain, thunder, and lightning to fill the jungle. After pressing the yellow stone, the storm dramatically increases and trees start getting blown over. Cha-Ka runs frightened to Rick and together they track Will and Holly's footprints. In the sky Will and Holly see the diamond-shaped objects, as does Rick. It begins to hail and Will is trapped by a falling tree. Rick finds them and helps Will out, but the frightened dinosaurs begin to surround them and the family escapes by jumping into the waterhole.

While in hiding, Rick discovers that the diamonds are flashing colors in the opposite sequence to what Will and Holly touched. He tries to communicate with them using his mirror, but they seem to offer no response. The Marshalls return to the Pylon and touch the stones in the sequence indicated by the diamonds, and the storm comes to an end.

Rick suggest that the diamonds were created by the Altrusians to maintain the pylons. Holly decides to name them Skylons because they resemble the Pylon, but are in the sky.

== Reception ==
The online review site Premium Hollywood described "Skylons" in 2009 as a "tight installment" that furthers the mythology of the series.

Film historian Hal Erickson criticized the episode's special effects, saying the storm cloud effect "looks more like something out of a magician's fog machine."
