= Tag-Team (Land of the Lost) =

- Land of the Lost episode
- Grumpy and Alice fight over the crevasse
- Episode no.: Season 1 Episode 5
- Directed by: Dennis Steinmetz
- Written by: Norman Spinrad
- Original air date: October 5, 1974

Episode chronology
← Previous "Downstream"	Next → "The Stranger"

"Tag-Team" is the fifth episode of the first season of the 1974 American television series Land of the Lost. Written by Norman Spinrad and directed by Dennis Steinmetz, it first aired in the United States on October 5, 1974, on NBC.

== Plot ==
The Marshalls conclude that Dopey, a brontosaurus they encountered previously, is not useful in pulling their wagon, and try to lose him in the forest. The family then proceeds to harvest giant carrots and turnips, only to have them stolen by Cha-Ka and the two elder Pakuni (Ta and Sa). The Marshalls and the Pakuni get in an argument, but are interrupted by the fleeing Dopey and the rampaging Grumpy (a tyrannosaur).

Will and Holly take turns with Cha-Ka in distracting the tyrannosaur long enough to let the other find momentary safety. Big Alice (an allosaur) sees Will, Holly, and Cha-Ka, and begins to pursue them as well. The three accidentally fall down a crevasse, leaving Grumpy and Alice face-to-face on opposite sides of the crevasse.

Rick joins up with the elder Pakuni and together they search for their families amid the dinosaurs' fight. Rick tries to tell the Pakuni to create a diversion while he lowers a rope to rescue the three. The Pakuni do not understand, but come to the same conclusion on their own, and lure Grumpy away while Alice is stuck on the opposite side of the crevasse. Rick pulls everyone out of the crevasse just as Grumpy returns, continuing to roar at Alice. The Marshalls and the Pakuni arrive to safety, and Rick teaches the Pakuni how to harvest vegetables to prevent them from stealing again.

== Reception ==
The online review site Premium Hollywood described the episode in 2009 as a "straight-up dino tale" that follows the "lackluster" suit of the first five episodes.
