= Tag team (disambiguation) =

In professional wrestling, a tag team is a team of two or more wrestlers who take turns in the ring. More generally, a tag team is two or more people taking turns doing a job (e.g. as in tag-team parenting).

Tag team or Tag Team may also refer to:

- Tag Team (group), an American hip-hop duo
- "Tag-Team" (Land of the Lost episode), an episode of the 1974 series Land of the Lost
- The developers of the video game Tag: The Power of Paint

== See also ==
- Tag Team Wrestling, a video game
- Team tag, team-based variations of the game of tag
