= The Stranger (Land of the Lost) =

- Land of the Lost episode
- Enik speaks to the Marshalls while Rick holds the Mageti
- Episode no.: Season 1 Episode 6
- Directed by: Bob Lally
- Written by: Walter Koenig
- Original air date: October 12, 1974

Guest appearance
- Walker Edmiston as Enik

Episode chronology
← Previous "Tag-Team"	Next → "Album"

"The Stranger" is the sixth episode of the first season of the 1974 American television series Land of the Lost. Written by Walter Koenig and directed by Bob Lally, it first aired in the United States on October 12, 1974 on NBC. The episode guest stars Walker Edmiston.

== Plot ==
While searching for edible food, the Marshalls discover a cave in which they find a mounted, glowing lozenge which seems to jerk them as they near it. The family is interrupted by the arrival of six Sleestak, and Rick threatens them with the lozenge. The scuffle is interrupted by the arrival of Enik, a Sleestak-like creature who calls himself an Altrusian. Enik waves his hands and the Sleestak flee.

Enik explains that like the Marshalls, he has fallen through a "dimensional doorway" into the past of the Land of the Lost, and that the Sleestak are his evolutionary antecedents. He explains that the diamond is the Mageti, a "tool for traveling through the universe." He plans to use it to return to his own time, and suggests that with the proper coordinates the Marshalls may be able to return to their own dimension. Enik also explains that the Mageti will up to a point carry out the impulses of those near it, but will self-destruct when surrounded by hostile or aggressive emotions.

When Enik tries to take back the Mageti, Will becomes aggressive, and the Mageti self-destructs. In dismay, Enik explains that he has a smaller Mageti stone (a "fourth dimensional node"), but that it requires a power source to operate. The Marshalls point out the Lost City has many such nodes, which Enik finds hard to believe.

On the way to the Lost City, a group of Sleestak attack the party, and Enik is unable to understand his ancestors' behavior (since future Altrusians always keep their emotions in check). Rick attracts the attention of Alice to frighten away the Sleestak, and the party reaches the Lost City. Upon seeing the ruins, Enik realizes that he has not, in fact, traveled to the past, but rather to the distant future, and that the Sleestak are the barbaric descendants of the Altrusians. He surmises that his people lost control of their emotions and devolved into the Sleestak.

Understanding now that the Lost City is his own city, Enik leads the Marshalls to a room full of dimensional nodes where he plans to recharge his Mageti so that he can return to his proper time and warn the Altrusians of their imminent destruction. Will steals the Mageti, but Enik invokes a mist that shows each of the Marshalls their worst fears. Rick tells Enik that this sort of dispassionate attack is the product of the emotionlessness of the Altrusians, and that it is more likely that this is how they devolved into Sleestak. Enik agrees and removes the smoke, and Will returns the node.

Three Sleestak come in, but Enik tells the Marshalls to place a blue and a green node together to create a force field. Unable to enter, the Sleestak leave, as does Enik.

== Reception ==
The online review site Premium Hollywood described the episode in 2009 as "part sci-fi and part morality play" when "Land of the Lost really begins to take off", noting that the episode is written by "no less than" Walter Koenig. Edmiston's performance of Enik is described as "probably the best acting job in the entire series" and "a huge coup for the series", noting that "his mere introduction couldn’t help but alter the feel and direction of the show". Premium Hollywood went on to describe the episode as notably deeper, more complex, and more philosophical than those previous, with "hefty ideas on display." The site concluded that "The Stranger" makes it "glaringly obvious that this is far more than just a kid’s show".

In Sid and Marty Krofft: A Critical Study of Saturday Morning Children's Television, 1969-1993, film and television historian Hal Erickson calls this episode "superb" and praises it for the introduction of the character of Enik, whom Erickson describes as "the series' most fascinating character — and the one closest to the Star Trek brand of cerebral science-fiction/fantasy."
