= The Sleestak God =

- Land of the Lost episode
- Holly and Will sit suspended above the god
- Episode no.: Season 1 Episode 2
- Directed by: Dennis Steinmetz
- Written by: David Gerrold
- Original air date: September 14, 1974

Episode chronology
← Previous "Cha-Ka"	Next → "Dopey"

"The Sleestak God" is the second episode of the first season of the 1974 American television series Land of the Lost. Written by David Gerrold and directed by Dennis Steinmetz, it first aired in the United States on September 14, 1974 on NBC.

== Plot ==
While heading for water, Will and Holly are sidetracked by the discovery of an ancient ruin. Using Morse code by reflecting sunlight from a mirror worn on a necklace, Will messages their discovery to Rick, who agrees to meet with them in the jungle.

Soon Will and Holly discover they are being tracked by Cha-Ka, and chase after him, only to run into a triceratops. After escaping, they help Cha-Ka remove the splint with which he was fitted in the previous episode. Together the three head to meet with Rick, but end up in a different set of ruins. On a wall they discover the warning "beware of sleestak", at which Cha-Ka begins to shout "Sarisataka" (i.e., Sleestak) and runs off. Unbeknownst to the siblings, three reptilian humanoids (Sleestak) begin to trail them.

Will and Holly find themselves in the original ruins, but are soon attacked and captured by the Sleestak, who carry them into the ruins and trap them in a large net hung over a pit from which long, rasping groans can be heard. Cha-Ka finds Rick and quickly leads him to the ruins, where they are intimidated by an allosaur (dubbed earlier "Big Alice" by Holly). Meanwhile, Will and Holly escape from their net, but are recaptured by the Sleestak and placed in a new net. Rick and Cha-Ka enter the ruins and fend off the Sleestak with a torch, which accidentally falls into the pit and sets the creature within on fire.

The Marshalls and Cha-Ka escape, leaving the creature (the eponymous "Sleestak god") still alive. Once they reach safety, Rick reminds the children that they still need to get the water.

== Reception ==
Television historian David Hofstede labeled the introduction of the Sleestak as one of the "great moments" in the series. Film historian Hal Erickson praised "The Sleestak God" for keeping Cha-Ka's leg broken from the previous episode, saying "That's what we mean by good continuity."

The online review site Premium Hollywood described "The Sleestak God" in 2009 as slow, saying that "not much happens." It added that the addition of the Sleestak, however, was worthwhile, calling them "creepy as hell".
