= Tar pit (disambiguation) =

A tar pit is a geological occurrence where subterranean bitumen leaks to the surface, creating a large puddle, pit, or lake of asphalt.

Tarpit may also refer to:

- "Tar Pit" (Land of the Lost), an episode of the 1974 series Land of the Lost
- Tar Pit (DC Comics), a supervillain from DC Comics
- Tarpit (networking), information security and anti-spam techniques in networking
- Turing tarpit, a type of programming language
