= Tar Pit (Land of the Lost) =

- Land of the Lost episode
- Episode no.: Season 2 Episode 1
- Directed by: Gordon Wiles
- Written by: Margaret Armen
- Original air date: September 6, 1975

Episode chronology
← Previous "Circle"	Next → "The Zarn"

"Tar Pit" is the first episode of the second season of the 1975 American television series Land of the Lost. Written by Margaret Armen and directed by Gordon Wiles, it first aired in the United States on September 6, 1975 on NBC.

== Plot ==
Cha-Ka is painting a picture of Ta with the help of Sa on a rock by the tar pit. Meanwhile, while playing with Dopey, Spot falls into the pit. Dopey tries to join him and falls on a broken rock in the pit. The two dinosaurs pine for help and Cha-Ka discovers them, forgoing his painting to Ta's chagrin.

Cha-Ka runs for help while Spot escapes, leaving Dopey. Will, Holly, and Rick fashion a lasso to save the dinosaur. Dopey proves too heavy, however, and the lariat breaks. Will and Rick begin building a pulley system to make use of mechanical advantage, and Cha-Ka goes to recruit Ta and Sa in the operation.

Sa has taken over the painting of Sa, but is only making it worse. When Cha-Ka arrives, he convinces Ta (and Sa) to help on the condition that afterward he will complete the portrait. Will and Rick complete their pulley, but it falls apart on the first try. Ta and Sa leave, taking Cha-Ka with them. The Marshalls give up on Dopey but nonetheless camp out beside the dinosaur.

That evening Cha-Ka leads Emily to the tar pit, and Rick ties Dopey's rope around Emily's neck. When Emily refuses to leave, Will and Rick use torches to scare her away, causing her to pull Dopey out of the pit.

== Reception ==
In 2013 Wesley Eure, the actor who played Will, recalled this episode's unusually extensive use of the artificial language Pakuni in the following way:

I was watching the Land of The Lost episode "Tar Pit" on TV today on KTLA. I forgot almost the entire episode was spoken in Pakuni, the language of Cha-ka. I kept thinking how daring to have the show feature a language the kids could not speak, but the talented actors who played Cha-ka, Ta and Sa were able to tell the story! I don't know about you, but as I watched the episode I kept thinking surly we are going to speak English soon! But over half of the dialogue is Pakuni!! […] One thing is fairly certain, however: it was [Joe] Taritero [NBC's Vice President of Children's Programming at the time] who set in motion the creation of "Pakuni," the primitive language spoken by the Cha-Ka, Ta and Sa, the series' three Cenozoic ape-man characters. "At first, we talked about using Pig Latin or English words spelled backwards," recalled Taritero, "but we decided that if we were going to have people speaking foreign sounds, those sounds should be a real language."

Bowing to what he termed "teacher pressure," Taritero took the new-language angle a step farther, promoting Pakuni as a potential educational tool. "I decided to commission a language that would be fun Saturday morning, but then might translate into learning Spanish the following week." He took this challenge to UCLA, where he was referred to Victoria Fromkin, Ph.D., the head of the university's department of linguistics. "The idea of creating a language that could be learned by children was an exciting challenge," remembered Dr. Fromkin, "Not just the old 'Me Tarzan, You Jane' sort of thing."

Fromkin also wanted to avoid the quasi-English "foreign" tongues used on such TV programs as Mission: Impossible. Pakuni would be literally built from scratch, without any Latin, Slavic or Anglo-Saxon roots. First off, Fromkin established a common ground between the new language and existing ones: sounds (vowels, consonants) and syntax (rules for combining words, like "subject-verb- object"). Two rules were also established early on: Pakuni plurals would be created with the addition of the suffic "ni"; and, unlike English, Pakuni adjectives always followed nouns.

Eventually, Fromkin developed a Pakuni vocabulary of some 300 words.
