= Kathy Coleman =

American actress (born 1962)

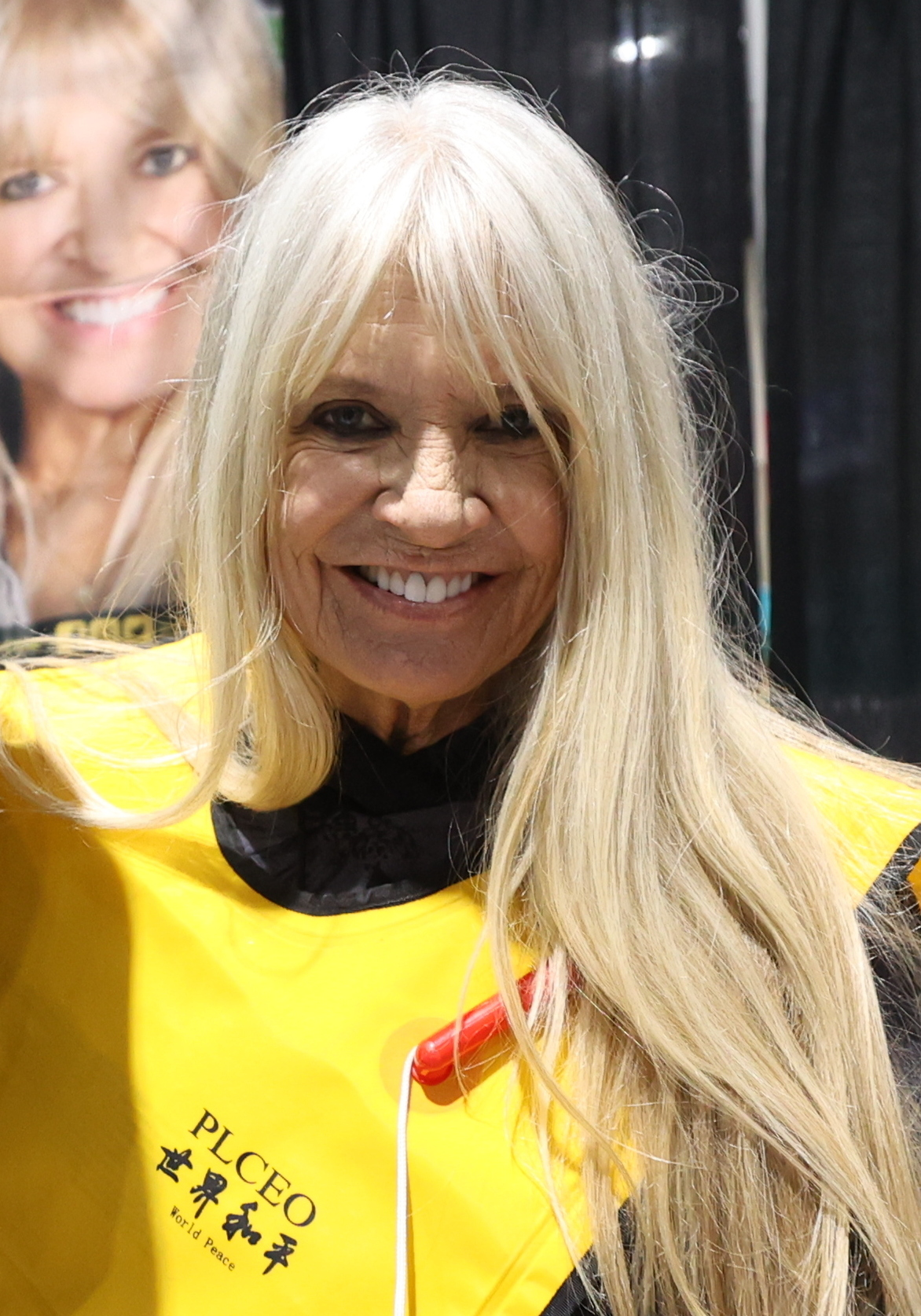
- Coleman at GalaxyCon Richmond in 2025
- Born: Kathleen Coleman; February 18, 1962 (age 64); Weymouth, Massachusetts, US
- Citizenship: United States of America
- Occupations: Actress, singer, author
- Years active: 1974–1976
- Known for: Land of the Lost
- Spouse: Bob
- Children: 2
- Website: KathyColeman.net (archived)

Kathleen Coleman (born February 18, 1962) is an American former actress, singer, and author, known for playing Holly Marshall on the 1970s children's TV show Land of the Lost.

== Life and career ==
Coleman was born in Weymouth, Massachusetts. She toured as a singer with the Mike Curb Congregation.

In 1974, she was cast by Sid and Marty Krofft to play Holly Marshall, the younger of two siblings trapped with their father in a strange land in Land of the Lost. It was her only major television role, which continued for three seasons. She contributed interviews and commentary tracks for the Land of the Lost DVDs produced by Rhino in 2004. She and fellow Land of the Lost cast member Wesley Eure filmed cameos for the 2009 film parodying the series, but those scenes were not included in the theatrical release.

She appeared in an episode of the police drama Adam-12 in 1975, and in 1977, she played Sella in the Thespian play Noah.

In 2014, Coleman appeared in a parade in Simi Valley, California.

== Personal life ==
In 1980, at the age of 18, Coleman married and moved to Fallon, Nevada, where she and her husband worked on her father-in-law's dairy farm. The couple had two sons before divorcing in 1987.

In 2015, she published Lost Girl: The Truth and Nothing But the Truth, So Help Me Kathleen, which describes her marriages as well as her experiences in music, TV, and on the autograph circuit. In 2017, she published a second memoir, entitled Run Holly Run, which highlighted her time working on Land of the Lost.
