= Downstream (Land of the Lost) =

- Land of the Lost episode
- Jefferson Collie at his cannon, Sarah
- Episode no.: Season 1 Episode 4
- Directed by: Dennis Steinmetz
- Written by: Larry Niven
- Original air date: September 28, 1974

Guest appearance
- Walker Edmiston as Jefferson Davis Collie III

Episode chronology
← Previous "Dopey"	Next → "Tag-Team"

"Downstream" is the fourth episode of the first season of the 1974 American television series Land of the Lost. Written by Larry Niven and directed by Dennis Steinmetz, it first aired in the United States on September 28, 1974 on NBC. The episode guest stars Walker Edmiston.

== Plot ==
The Marshalls build a raft and head downstream in search of civilization, with the hope of finding a way back to Earth. The raft comes to a waterfall where they are forced to quickly leap into a cave.

Inside they meet a crazed man who identifies himself as Jefferson Davis Collie III (Walker Edmiston), a Confederate artilleryman. Collie forces them to mine the glowing minerals of his cavern to earn a meal. Rick hypothesizes that the lode may be a radioactive power source which causes the opening of time portals.

Collie explains the peculiar properties of the minerals (such as that a red and a green crystal together make a bright light, and an added yellow crystal creates a blinding but short-lived light) and tells of his experience shooting and eating three Sleestak. He explains that the river travels underground, but refuses to tell the Marshalls if and where the river comes up again, explaining that he is starved for company and wants them to stay.

Three Sleestak appear with crossbows, but Collie scares them off with rounds from his cannon, "Sarah." Out of water, Collie heads to refill, and the Marshalls sneak after him. The four are ambushed by Sleestak, and Rick puts a red, green, and yellow crystal together, creating a blinding flash that dazes the monsters. The light quickly dies, however. Will grabs a blue crystal and a green crystal, which together make a bomb which explodes around the Sleestak.

The Marshalls and Collie escape into the river, and head downstream. Eventually they find themselves in a swamp, and recognizing the Pylon, realize the river runs in a circle and has led back to their own part of the jungle. Rick supposes the jungle is impossible to leave without a time portal, calling it a "closed universe." Collie, frightened by the dinosaurs, decides to return to his cave.

== Creation and reception ==
During the filming of a scene where Walker Edmiston fired the cannon, the charge was so strong an actor playing a Sleestak was knocked over.

In 2009, the online review site Premium Hollywood described the episode as "lackluster", but added that it "begins to offer us a peek into how complex this series could become."

== Plot Holes ==
Collie questions the Marshalls about whether they are "Union" or "Confederate". When they state they are from California he tells them California is not state. In fact California was admitted to the union in 1850, eleven years before the civil war.
