= Dopey (Land of the Lost) =

- Land of the Lost episode
- Holly teaches Dopey to pull a wagon
- Episode no.: Season 1 Episode 3
- Directed by: Dennis Steinmetz
- Written by: Margaret Armen
- Original air date: September 21, 1974

Episode chronology
← Previous "The Sleestak God"	Next → "Downstream"

"Dopey" is the third episode of the first season of the 1974 American television series Land of the Lost. Written by Margaret Armen and directed by Dennis Steinmetz, it first aired in the United States on September 21, 1974 on NBC.

== Plot ==
Will and Holly try to push a wagon built by Rick, but conclude that without an engine it isn't worth the trouble. While avoiding work, Holly discovers a freshly hatched, man-sized dinosaur egg. The two siblings quickly depart with the wagon for fear of running into the dinosaur's mother.

After harvesting a patch of giant strawberries, Will and Holly find a baby brontosaurus (or "brontosaur"). Together they name the dinosaur "Dopey". When Holly offers Dopey a strawberry, the brontosaurus begins to chase after them and ends up stuck between two trees. It begins yowling and attracts the attention of many other dinosaurs in the jungle, including the tyrannosaur Grumpy. Will and Holly run, assuming that Dopey will be eaten. They return later to fetch their wagonload of strawberries, and soon find themselves followed by Dopey, who has survived. Rick agrees to let Dopey stay with them at the bluff.

Holly trains Dopey to pull a cart, and during the night sneaks out to sleep with the brontosaurus. The next morning Grumpy returns, but the Marshalls are able to drive him off with the "flyswatter." Rick decides that Dopey must be sent back to his own kind. After breakfast, the family leads Dopey to the swamp, where he joins a mother dinosaur the Marshalls have named "Emily."

== Reception ==
The online review site Premium Hollywood described the episode in 2009 as a "straight-up dino tale" that follows the "lackluster" suit of the first several episodes.
