= Land of the Lost (1991 TV series) =

- Created by: Krofft Entertainment
- Based on: Land of the Lost by David Gerrold; Allan Foshko
- Starring: Timothy Bottoms; Jennifer Drugan; Robert Gavin; Ed Gale; Shannon Day; Bobby Porter
- Voices of: Danny Mann
- Country of origin: United States
- Original language: English
- No. of seasons: 2
- No. of episodes: 26

Production
- Running time: approx. 22 minutes (per episode)
- Production company: Krofft Entertainment

Original release
- Network: ABC
- Release: September 7, 1991 – December 5, 1992

Related
- Land of the Lost (original series)

Land of the Lost is a half-hour Saturday-morning children's television series that debuted on ABC in the fall of 1991, a remake of the original series of the same name which ran from 1974 to 1976. Re-runs were later picked up by Nickelodeon from 1995 to 1997. Tiger Toys received the license to produce a toyline based on the series, which included regular and "talking" action figures, several dinosaurs and playsets, an electronic "Crystal Sword", as well as an electronic LCD game and a board game.

== Synopsis ==
Motivated by the success in syndication of the cult 1974 series Land of the Lost, Sid and Marty Krofft created a new version of it. The new Land of the Lost had advanced special effects and a lighter, less survivalist-oriented tone. Frequent writers Len Janson and Chuck Menville had previously crafted numerous scripts for assorted Filmation series, while producer Jerry Golod had earlier collaborated with George A. Romero on Tales from the Darkside.

The series ran for 26 episodes spread over two seasons, with each season consisting of 13 episodes. It featured the Porter family - teenager Kevin, his young sister Annie, and their widowed father Tom - trapped in a parallel universe after their Jeep Cherokee fell through a time portal while exploring the back country. They soon meet another human, a beautiful jungle girl named Christa who came from 1960s San Francisco. Christa became trapped in the Land of the Lost when she was very young and grew up alone (an earlier concept would have featured an adult Holly Marshall as the "mystery girl", along with Cha-Ka, but, due to casting, the characters were re-visualized as Christa and Stink).

The Porters live in a large "treehouse" (although it is actually built between a series of large logs and not rooted trees) that the family built after they realized their tents provided little safety from dangerous dinosaurs. After their first encounter with the dinosaur Scarface, they devised an alarm system by stringing up a series of empty tin cans surrounding the treehouse perimeter that would shake and make noise if Scarface were to show up again.

Intelligent natives of the Land of the Lost include the chimpanzee-like Pakuni and the lizard-like Sleestaks. Also, many species of dinosaurs fill the jungle. A Paku named Stink and a baby dinosaur named Tasha were befriended by the Porters. Acting as antagonists were a trio of exiled Sleestak criminals named Shung, Keeg and Nim. Shung is their leader and possesses a powerful Crystal Sword. Another major obstacle faced by the Porters was a one-eyed Tyrannosaurus rex named Scarface, who lived near the area where the family made their home and frequently chased after them in an attempt to eat them.

A sorceress named Keela with genuine magical powers was introduced in the second season and appeared in two episodes. Another character added in the second season was Namaki, a strange fish-like humanoid who befriended Christa when she was just a little girl.

12 episodes of Season 1 were released onto videocassette at two episodes per video. As of 2024, the series has yet to be released on DVD or Blu-ray. However, as of February 2025, it is streaming on Amazon Prime Video.

== Characters ==
=== The Porters ===
- Thomas "Tom" Porter (portrayed by Timothy Bottoms) is the main character of the series, the widowed father of Kevin and Annie. After his wife, Natasha, died in a car accident, he spent the next few years burying himself in his work as an architect. Before his wife's death, Tom would take his family camping most weekends in order to devote more time to them. Continuing the tradition, he arranged to take his children on the camping trip which ultimately led to their arrival in the Land of the Lost. As a result, he feels enormous guilt for trapping his family in this dangerous place and strives to find a way back home to San Francisco at every opportunity. He is a compassionate man with a deep sense of morality and fairplay even when dealing with those who would threaten him or his family. Tom is a devoted and protective parent but is not above giving his kids "space" when he feels it is acceptable to do so. Back home, he often spent his afternoons jogging, hoping one day to win a marathon race. In the episode, "Flight to Freedom", it is revealed he is approximately 180 pounds (He says to Scarface that he is, "180 pounds of raw meat").
- Kevin Porter (portrayed by Robert Gavin) is Tom's 16-year-old son. He is the most laid-back member of the family. Not only does he accept their situation but he actually grows to like it. Unfortunately, his carefree attitude breeds indifference to the dangers around him and he often finds himself in more peril than he expected. He likes to think of himself as an adult and will often disobey his father if he thinks Tom is being unfair. Of all the Porters, Kevin is the one most reliant on the comforts and conveniences of the modern world. In addition to the usual camping gear, Kevin also smuggled in a portable six-inch TV, a camcorder, a boom-box, and a bag of various junk foods which he keeps hidden from the others. His goal is to one day become a world-famous director, and he carries the camcorder with him at all times to capture the sights and wonders of the Land of the Lost. He expects this footage to propel him to stardom once they return to their own world. He is also a capable, self-taught mechanic, and one of his primary responsibilities is taking care of the family truck to ensure that it is running smoothly when they need it. Kevin often prefers to explore alone and dislikes having to "babysit" his sister. He thinks of her as being a complete "nerd" and often trades insults with her. However, deep down he's very much a caring brother and will not hesitate to act if she's in danger. Kevin has a crush on Christa and often goes out of his way to impress her.
- Anamarie "Annie" Porter (portrayed by Jennifer Drugan) is Tom's 11-year-old daughter. She is very bright and intuitive for her age and resents her family (especially Kevin whom she considers a "dork") for treating her like a baby. She has had to grow up rather quickly in a hostile environment and has shown that she is more than capable of taking care of herself on many occasions. Annie is a vegetarian, and one of her responsibilities is maintaining her garden at the base of the treehouse. The sorceress Keela takes her on as an apprentice and entrusts her with her spellbook when she has to leave for extended periods. Annie is extremely protective of the dinosaur Tasha and treats her not as a pet but as a member of the family. She is also a bit of an artist, as shown in the episode, "The Thief", when she draws a picture of Christa to give her as a present for the birthday party they throw her. In, "Annie in Charge", her full name is revealed to be, "Anamarie".

=== Visitors to the Land ===
- Christa (portrayed by Shannon Day as an adult, Farrah Emami as a child) is a lovely jungle girl. Like the Porters, she is from on Earth where she was born in Chicago. Her family was trapped in the Land of the Lost through circumstances similar to the Porters. At one point, Christa's family built a raft to try to sail to the other side of the ocean, hoping to find signs of civilization. In a subsequent storm, Christa was washed overboard but found refuge on a floating tree trunk where after several days of drifting she found her way to a far away beach. Separated from her parents, Christa grew up practically alone and by the time the Porters met her, had repressed almost everything about her previous life, to the point where she no longer remembers most of the English language, which she slowly recovers over the course of the series. She is fiercely independent and feels safe and at home in the jungle. However, she's not oblivious to its many dangers and uses her knowledge of its topography, inhabitants, and various medicinal plants to aid the Porters whenever she can. Christa is fluent in Pakuni often greeting her human friends with "Acuba Ne" to express both "hello" and "goodbye". She is like an older sister to Annie and the object of Kevin's infatuation. Flashbacks of Christa as a child were seen in "Life's a Beach". She has curly brown hair and wears a fur bikini along with fur boots. In addition, Christa also has a yell similar to Tarzan's that can calm certain animals which she presumably learned from Stink.
- Sir Balen (portrayed by Bobby Jacoby) a squire who pretended to be a knight from King Arthur's Court. After "borrowing" his master's armor and sword while he's asleep, Marty Balen sets out into the moors and is enshrouded in a "blue bubbling fog" and winds up in the Land of the Lost just in time to save Christa from the Sleestaks. After Shung hears of this, he sends the Sleestaks after "Ironface"'s "magic blade" (his sword). Balen's desire to protect "M'lady Christa" causes friction with a jealous Kevin as he sets out to escort her home not aware that she can take care of herself. Kevin is guilted into going after him when they again encounter Scarface ("The king of all dragons"). After eluding him, the ground shakes and another doorway appears. Balen offers Kevin his morning star in recognition of his bravery and disappears through the gate.
- Keela (portrayed by Adilah Barnes) is a sorceress from another time who was banished to the Land for not using her magic to aid Magas. She arrived through a green dimensional gate located in a desert on the other side of the Land of the Lost. Keela is gifted in the ways of magic and sorcery but is not powerful enough to send the Porters (or herself) home. The Porters helped her defeat her enemy Magas whom Keela had turned into a one-eyed dinosaur-like beast. Keela trusts the Porters entirely, even accepting Annie as an informal apprentice and asking her to guard her spellbook while away. She is a very compassionate person, but admits that even she has times when she abuses her powers (i.e. turning her older brothers into toads) although she may have been joking.
- Magas (portrayed by Ed Gale) is a short, cruel sorcerer and the brother of the late queen whom Keela served. She recognized him as a heartless person and turned him into a Cyclopean dinosaur-like beast, similar to a giant from Jack the Giant Killer and the Cyclops from The 7th Voyage of Sinbad, thus sealing his magical powers. Over time, he slowly regained his power and hunted Keela down to the Porters' treehouse. He was defeated by Keela with Tasha's help, but not before Keela restored him to his true form.
- Siren (portrayed by Marta DuBois) was once a beautiful woman, but her beauty became more important than her family. She was sentenced to the Land with no hope of ever seeing the ones she loved in the afterlife and she used her music to bring the Porters to her. The Siren disguised herself as Tom's wife Natasha. After talking to Tom about her past, she was finally able to ascend to the heavens.
- Simon Cardenas (portrayed by Danny Gonzalez) s a teenage time-traveler from San Francisco Island in the year 2062. After "borrowing" his father's time-belt, he collides with a Myzarian Cyborg while traveling through the time/space corridor, and his damaged belt drops him off in the Land following a dimensional shift. He wears an "inter-trans" suit that apparently works in conjunction with the belt, possibly protecting the wearer from the forces involved in such travel. He frequently speaks using a form of "futuristic slang" that involves a shortening of modern adjectives (for example, "pendous" for "stupendous" or "morb" for "morbid"). He returns home once the belt's auto-recall device is activated.
- Cy, also known as the Myzarian Cyborg, it is a gigantic rancor-like cyborg from the planet Myzar-3 who became trapped in the Land of the Lost after colliding with another time traveler in the dimensional corridor, damaging his time device. He is exceptionally intelligent, and his strength alone makes him more than an even match for the dinosaur Scarface. Some of his cybernetic enhancements include the ability to see in the infrared spectrum in one eye as well as heightened senses. He lives in a cave in the mountains that he has made into a base of operations and attacks anyone who comes near. The entrance to his lair is booby-trapped with auto-defense mechanisms which include a form of nerve gas that causes temporary memory loss in humans and renders them unconscious. He wears a device on his wrist which can perform a similar function. Because he comes from a world rich in hydrogen and oxygen, he becomes winded easily in the Land due to the thinner air. In addition, this particular model was recalled due to being particularly susceptible to ultraviolet light.

=== Native inhabitants ===
Like its 1970s counterpart, the inhabitants of the Land of the Lost are mostly dinosaurs. An iguana can be seen occasionally. A creature, called an "osongi", which resembles an iguana, once bit Tom. A spitting viper called the "shika" is seen in the Valley of Death, and it blinds Kevin temporarily. Termites have also been found.

- A Triceratops named Princess is sometimes used as transportation for Christa and Stink. Christa (perhaps unconsciously) named her after a dog her family once owned. Princess is distinct from the other Triceratops in that her right horn is broken in half. A male Triceratops was seen in "Siren's Song" and "In Dinos We Trust".
- A Stegosaurus named Spike fought with Scarface. Shung once used his crystal to make Spike fight with Princess. In the Cyborg's debut episode, Annie refers to Spike as a female. When Stink pretended to be injured, Kevin got on top of Spike's back to gather fruit from a tree before Spike fought with Scarface again.
- Tasha's mother, a Parasaurolophus was killed by Scarface. Another one, named Momma TwoLegs, appears frequently.
- A Brontosaurus whom the Porters sometimes call Big Guy also appears frequently, mostly browsing on the vegetation, either at big lakes or at the Porters' treehouse. He is thought by some fans to be Dopey, the infant sauropod from the original series, all grown up. He once helped Annie down from a tree when Kevin took away a ladder, and saved Tasha from the Sleestaks. Big Guy and Momma TwoLegs can sometimes be seen at the lake. In "Life's a Beach", Big Guy is seen with another Brontosaurus, possibly his mate.
- A Pteranodon (described in the series as Pterodactyl) tried to kill and eat Kevin when he diverted the creature's attention while Christa picked some special plants to help heal his dad who was bitten by a poisonous lizard. One also tried to kill Kevin in another episode as he was looking for a birthday present for Christa. It also stole some of the Porters' belongings.
- At the beach, there are also dangerous marine predators; something resembling a dolphin-sized mosasaur once attacked Kevin, until it was hurt by Tom and Christa and fled. There is also a tentacled creature that dwells within an oil pool seen in "Opah". There is a pack of creatures Kevin calls "Prehistoric Pitbulls" (possibly dire wolves), also called "makani", that chase Kevin in "Something's Watching" and Smilodon bones have also been found in the Valley of Death.

==== Tasha ====
One of the main dinosaurs in the show is Tasha (performed by Ed Gale, voiced by Danny Mann), an orphaned baby Parasaurolophus. After the death of her mother at the claws of Scarface, Tasha's egg was rescued by Annie. Upon hatching, Kevin was the first person she saw and she immediately imprinted on him. However, possibly because he ignores her, Tasha treats Annie as her mother instead living with the Porters as a pet. What will happen to her if the Porters ever find a way home, is a frequent subject of discussion. Annie names her after her mother. Tasha appears to be quite intelligent for a dinosaur exhibiting almost human behavior at times. Through pantomime, body language, and an extensive range of vocal emotions she is surprisingly capable of communicating with humans. She seems to understand complex commands and inquiries and is even able to grasp and manipulate items in her claws (like throwing a ball). For a short time, Tasha was given the ability to speak by Keela. Tasha has a voracious appetite for a herbivore and will try to eat almost anything within reach. However, she prefers melons.

==== Scarface ====
A Tyrannosaurus, whom the Porters named Scarface (this series' reboot of 1970s' Grumpy) lives in the area. He has a scar through his right eye, hence his name, which is a lasting testament to his aggressive nature. Scarface is blind in his right eye because of the scar, leaving him able to see only through his left eye (an advantage to his prey). Scarface is one of the Porters' worst threats, as he could take down their treehouse and has tried to before.

Because of his violent nature, Scarface is an enemy to everybody in the series, including the Sleestaks. When Cy arrived, it was thought that he killed Scarface in their fight, but it was eventually revealed that Scarface was simply unconscious and used mud to heal himself. Also, upon being hit by a "light gun" found by Kevin and Stink in old Sleestak ruins, Scarface quickly recovered.

==== Pakuni ====
Pakuni are a tribe of hairy, humanoid primates native to the Land. In this series, their appearance is slightly different from the original 1974 series and 2009 movie.

- Stink (played by Bobby Porter): Stink is a Paku, similar to Cha-Ka, whose parents died as slaves in Shung's crystal mine when he was very young. Some time later, he met Christa as a little girl and they helped each other to survive becoming allies and inseparable friends. Despite his animal-like appearance, Stink is very intelligent, with an intense knowledge of plant and animal life. He is also extremely adaptable and quickly picks up modern slang, idioms, and mannerisms from his human friends although sometimes he uses them inappropriately. He is gifted with keen senses, incredible agility, insatiable curiosity, and a wacky sense of humor. Stink is very close to Annie. The two of them often work and play together, even teaming up against her brother and father. Stink has an easy friendship with Kevin as well, and a sometimes rocky friendship with Tasha. Possibly because of his ape-like ancestry, Stink has an affinity for bananas and suinaku fruit, as well as a fear of termites.
- Opah (played by Jonas Moscartolo): An elderly grey-haired Paku and Stink's grandfather. Opah taught Stink almost everything he knows about the Land and its native flora and fauna. He carries a flute which allows him to "charm" Scarface and other beasts (much like a snake-charmer) and passes both the instrument and the knowledge onto his grandson before he leaves to die. He also shows the Porters how to tap certain trees which contain a special sap which they can use to fuel the truck. Some fans consider Opah (which might be Pakuni for 'grandfather',) to be Cha-Ka.

==== Sleestaks ====
A race of intelligent, reptilian humanoids, the Sleestaks were highly advanced until their own pollution drove them to live in caves to avoid the dinosaurs ("thunder lizards" in their tongue). Unlike the original series, the Sleestaks don't have insectoid traits. The Sleestaks seen in the show are a group of criminals who were exiled to the surface world, their version of the death penalty. Omnivores, they will consume anything and have threatened to eat the Porters and their companions on several occasions. The trio took up refuge in an old, abandoned temple and have only managed to survive because of Shung's power crystal.

- Shung (portrayed by Tom Allard): Self-proclaimed leader of the Sleestak criminal band. He is arrogant, self-absorbed, and contemptuous of anyone but himself. He calls himself the ruler of the Land of the Lost, and he claims all that lives there (including the Porters and their truck) belong to him. While he possesses great strength and cunning, he is often depicted as lazy, preferring to send his minions, Nim and Keeg, out into the jungle to bring him food and to perform any other task that he feels is beneath him. He enforces his will with a powerful crystal that can perform amazing feats of both telekinetic and telepathic prowess and even gives him the ability to control minds. However, there is a price for this power; it gradually corrupts the mind of its user, as Annie discovers in "The Crystal". As a result, Shung is now addicted to the crystal's unique energy, and, if separated from it, will quickly weaken. His crystal is destroyed by Christa after he forced the Porters to fight each other. After looking through Keela's spellbook, Shung now knows a few spells. Shung often refers to those he considers inferior (meaning everyone) by nicknames such as calling his underlings "Wartsnippers", Christa "Long Hair", and Kevin "Quickmouth".
- Nim and Keeg (portrayed by R.C. Tass and Brian Williams respectively in 1991, Ross Kramer and Bret Davidson respectively in 1992): Shung's underlings. Nim appears to be the smarter one and was able to recite and use a spell Annie cast after hearing it only once. Keeg appears to be the dumb one as he did not know what a chariot was. However, he is a strong fighter (his peripheral vision is his chief weakness) and an excellent tracker. He is the most submissive of the pair. Despite their differences, they both try to please Shung with whatever they catch for him. However, their efforts almost always go unnoticed or unappreciated. "Keeg" is "geek" spelled backwards.

==== Others ====
- Namaki (portrayed by Tom Allard) is a strange, piscine-like humanoid who lives in a hut-like shelter on a beach miles from the Porter treehouse. Years ago, he befriended Christa's family and helped them build a raft to cross the ocean. They were reunited many years later when Christa (whom he refers to as "Christas") brought the Porters to that very same beach to relax. Despite his aquatic physiology, Namaki has never been to the other side of the ocean, afraid to attempt the crossing because of the frequent storms and the dangerous marine predators. Namaki is unable to hear music possibly due to his aquatic physiology. It is revealed that Namaki has a dislike for dinosaurs ("thunder lizards"), because of a scar he received on his right shoulder years before. But after the incident with the Siren, Namaki comes to like Tasha.

=== Unseen characters ===
- Natasha Porter (portrayed by Marta DuBois): Annie and Kevin's deceased mother. It was revealed in Life's a Beach that she died in a car accident two years before the events of the episode. Her name was revealed to be Natasha in the first episode, as Annie decided to name Tasha after her mother. In the episode "Siren's Song", a Siren takes on her form to fool Tom, but Natasha is never physically seen in any episode. Her voice is heard on the telephone in "Dream Maker" when the Porters think they have found their way back home, but such as the house itself, this was merely an illusion to confuse the family.
- Stink's Mother and Father: Stink reveals that many Pakuni were used as slave labor by the Sleestaks. Among those were his parents, both of whom died from overwork.

== Features ==
As with its 1970s counterpart, the Land of the Lost (never actually named within the series) exists in an entirely different dimension. It is a world similar to prehistoric Earth but it has three moons. The area in which the Porters live is a tropical jungle, although mention has also been made of a vast desert far away.

=== Crystals ===
Unique to this world is a peculiar type of quartz-like crystal that can be found in various caves throughout the Land. The Sleestaks often use Pakuni slave labor to mine these special crystals which can function as an energy source. In "Kevin vs. the Volcano", Kevin falls down a shaft covered in Sleestak markings (often marked by pictographs of lizards) and finds a huge shard nearly twice his size. Exposure to the sun reactivates this crystal and it causes it to pulsate, exerting a force which draws Kevin towards it when he tries to climb out of the shaft. Tom posits that the Sleestaks probably used these giant crystals to power their underground cities. It also might have been placed as a controlling device (not unlike the pylons from the 1970s series) for a nearby volcano as its destruction somehow reverses the volcano's eruption. In "Power Play", the Porters discover that smaller pieces of these crystals are compatible with modern batteries, allowing them to operate their 1990s technology once their original batteries run out.

In "Dreammaker", they find a number of crystals, varying in length, set into a device very similar to the matrix tables of the 1974 series, giving the crystals comparable power to much larger shards. This particular table is able to create very realistic illusions (but with physical substance) drawn from one's mind, designed to lure them in to a carefully constructed - but very real - trap. Tom believes that the Sleestaks probably built it to be a psychic weapon.

=== Dimensional Gates ===
These often blue (but sometimes green) swirling mists are portals to other worlds and times. They appear to be triggered by earthquakes and are accompanied by sudden winds just before they open and only for a few moments. In this version of Land of the Lost they seem to materialize at random but can be tracked through their electromagnetic interference using the Porter's portable TV. Tom Porter believes these gates will get them home even though he cannot be sure where or when it will take them.

== Crew ==
- Directors: John Carl Buechler, Anthony Bona, Jeff Burr, Len Janson, Frank De Palma, Ernest Farino, John Strysik, Gabe Torres
- Writers: Phil Combest, Jules Dennis, Janis Diamond, Len Janson, Chuck Menville, Richard Mueller, Gary Perconte, Michele Rifkin, Marianne Sellek, Reed Shelly
- Producers: The Chiodo Brothers/Sid and Marty Krofft
- Executive Producer: Jerry Golod
- Music: Kevin Kiner

== Episodes ==
=== Season 1 (1991) ===
No. overall	No. in season	Title	Original release date
1	1	"Tasha"	September 7, 1991
Annie and Kevin find a dinosaur egg in the forest while getting water. They take it home and it hatches. Annie names the baby dinosaur Tasha.
2	2	"Something's Watching"	September 14, 1991
While searching for a mystery woman Kevin caught on film, Tom is bitten and poisoned by a lizard. The mystery woman named Christa goes with Kevin to find an antidote. Note: Annie is a lefty, but she wears her watch on her left hand.
3	3	"Shung the Terrible"	September 21, 1991
Tasha is kidnapped by a trio of lizard people called Sleestaks who are led by Shung. Tom and Kevin go to rescue her.
4	4	"Jungle Girl"	September 28, 1991
The animals and dinosaurs of the land act strangely as the result of a lunar eclipse. Meanwhile, Tom is desperate to find Christa again.
5	5	"The Crystal"	October 5, 1991
Stink brings Annie a powerful Sleestak crystal which causes her personality to mirror Shung's.
6	6	"Wild Thing"	October 12, 1991
After causing too much trouble, Tom decides the best thing to do is send Tasha back into the wild.
7	7	"Day for Knight"	October 19, 1991
A knight named Sir Balen appears in the land through a portal very similar to the one that the Porters arrived in.
8	8	"Kevin vs. the Volcano"	October 26, 1991
While trying to help his family stop an erupting volcano from destroying their home, Kevin falls into a cave and gets stuck there by Scarface.
9	9	"Mind Games"	November 2, 1991
Shung uses a crystal to control Christa's mind.
10	10	"Flight to Freedom"	November 9, 1991
After an earthquake, the family discovers weird noise and static coming from Kevin's TV. Tom theorizes that they can use the TV to track down one of the portals that brought them to this land and use it to get home, but Tasha and Stink must stay behind.
11	11	"Heat Wave"	November 16, 1991
During a heat wave, Tom and Kevin go to find water while Stink and Tasha look for fruit. While out, Tom and Kevin come across Nim and Keeg and try to lure them away from their home, so that they do not find it.
12	12	"The Thief"	November 23, 1991
When the house is ransacked, Kevin is quick to accuse Stink of doing it.
13	13	"Power Play"	December 7, 1991
When all their batteries die, Tom sets out to take crystals from the Sleestaks to see if they can power the electrical items.

=== Season 2 (1992) ===
No. overall	No. in season	Title	Original release date
14	1	"The Sorceress"	September 12, 1992
Annie befriends a sorceress named Keela, who was banished to the Land by her evil brother Magus who she transformed into a one-eyed dinosaur-like beast.
15	2	"Dreammaker"	September 19, 1992
While searching for the source of a mysterious TV signal from Earth, the Porters come across their old neighborhood, thinking that they have found their way back home. However, everything is not what it seems to be when the appliances and furniture come to life.
16	3	"Opah"	September 26, 1992
Stink's grandfather Opah comes to pay one last visit.
17	4	"The Gladiators"	October 3, 1992
Tom and Kevin are captured by Sleestaks and Shung forces them to fight each other for their lives.
18	5	"Life's a Beach"	October 10, 1992
A day at the beach brings back haunting memories of Christa's past.
19	6	"Future Boy"	October 17, 1992
A young boy from the future arrives and unknowingly brings with him a dangerous and intelligent enemy.
20	7	"Siren's Song"	October 24, 1992
The Porters are lured to a hidden grotto with an image of Tom's late wife caused by a Siren.
21	8	"In Dinos We Trust"	October 31, 1992
Because Tasha allowed a Triceratops to scare him to the sight of where Christa was swimming, Kevin looks for a gift to make it up to her. After Kevin is blinded by a spitting viper, he is forced to rely on Tasha to lead him to safety and his family. Noticing that Kevin is missing, Christa helps Tom and Annie find Kevin before one of the carnivorous dinosaurs finds him.
22	9	"Annie in Charge"	November 7, 1992
Annie must take over after Tom and Kevin lose their memories in one of Cy's defensive traps.
23	10	"Make My Day"	November 14, 1992
Kevin discovers an ancient Sleestak weapon and plans to use its power to even the odds with Shung.
24	11	"Cheers"	November 21, 1992
Kevin becomes intoxicated from fermented fruit and winds up in trouble with Christa, his family, and even the Sleestaks.
25	12	"Sorceress's Apprentice"	November 28, 1992
Keela entrusts Annie with her spellbook while she is away for a few days, but Annie cannot resist trying out a little magic. Though this ends up going awry when Shung gets a hold of it.
26	13	"Misery Loves Company"	December 5, 1992
Stink injures his leg while helping the Porters and finds that he enjoys all of the extra attention a little too much.

== See also ==
- Land of the Lost (1974 TV series), the original children's television series created by Sid and Marty Krofft
  - List of Land of the Lost episodes
  - Land of the Lost characters and species
- Land of the Lost (film), a 2009 film starring Will Ferrell based on the 1974 series
