= Land of the Lost (film) =

2009 film by Brad Silberling

- Theatrical release poster
- Directed by: Brad Silberling
- Written by: Chris Henchy; Dennis McNicholas
- Based on: Land of the Lost by Sid & Marty Krofft
- Produced by: Jimmy Miller; Sid & Marty Krofft
- Starring: Will Ferrell; Danny McBride; Anna Friel; Jorma Taccone
- Cinematography: Dion Beebe
- Edited by: Peter Teschner
- Music by: Michael Giacchino
- Production companies: Universal Pictures; Relativity Media; Sid & Marty Krofft Pictures; Mosaic Media Group
- Distributed by: Universal Pictures
- Release dates: May 30, 2009 (Grauman's Chinese Theatre); June 5, 2009 (United States)
- Running time: 102 minutes
- Country: United States
- Language: English
- Budget: $100 million
- Box office: $69 million

Land of the Lost is a 2009 American science fiction adventure comedy film loosely based on Sid and Marty Krofft's television series of the same name. It was directed by Brad Silberling, and written by Chris Henchy and Dennis McNicholas. The ensemble cast includes Will Ferrell, Danny McBride, Anna Friel, and Jorma Taccone. The film follows a disgraced scientist, his assistant, and a theme park owner who are accidentally sucked into a space-time vortex and find themselves survived in an alternate dimension.

The film premiered at Grauman's Chinese Theatre on May 30, 2009, and was theatrically released in the United States on June 5, 2009, by Universal Pictures. It received negative reviews from critics and was a box-office failure, grossing $69 million worldwide on a $100 million budget. The film received seven Golden Raspberry Award nominations, including Worst Picture, winning Worst Prequel, Remake, Rip-off or Sequel.

== Plot ==
The founder of "quantum paleontology", Dr. Rick Marshall has a low-level job at the La Brea Tar Pits, three years after a disastrous interview with Matt Lauer on Today went viral and ruined his career. Doctoral candidate from Cambridge Holly Cantrell tells him that his controversial theories, combining time warps and paleontology, inspired her.

She shows him a fossil with an imprint of a cigarette lighter that he recognizes as his own, along with a crystal made into a necklace that gives off strong tachyon energy. She convinces him to finish his tachyon amplifier and go on an expedition to the Devil's Canyon Mystery Cave theme park where she found the fossil.

As they float into the cave on a small inflatable raft with the theme park's owner Will Stanton in the role of a paddler and narrator, Marshall detects high levels of tachyons. Activating the tachyon amplifier creates an earth-shaking time warp the raft falls into. Having regained their senses in a sandy desert interspersed with items from many eras and discovered that the amplifier is nowhere to be seen, the three travellers rescue an apeman by the name of Chaka, who becomes their friend and guide.

They spend the night in a cave where they have taken refuge from a pursuing telepathically endowed tyrannosaur they nickname "Grumpy", who develops a grudge against Marshall for being intellectually disparaged. In the morning, Marshall receives a telepathic invocation for help and is being drawn to run towards ancient ruins, where they encounter reptiloids called the Sleestak before meeting Enik the Altrusian, who sent the message. Exiled by the Zarn, who wants to take over the Earth with his Sleestak minions, Enik can prevent the invasion if Marshall gets the tachyon amplifier.

Led by Chaka, the group enters a rocky wasteland littered with artefacts from different epochs, encountering compsognathuses, dromaeosaurs, Grumpy, and a female allosaur nicknamed "Big Alice". These last two are battling it out over the remains of an ice-cream seller killed by the dromaeosaurs, until they sense Marshall and chase him. Marshall kills Big Alice with liquid nitrogen, finding the amplifier was swallowed by the allosaur. But a pteranodon snatches the amplifier into a volcanic crater functioning as an incubator. Treading lightly on the thin volcanic-glass floor of the glowing crater, Marshall gives himself over to the music of A Chorus Line coming from the tachyon amplifier, and dancingly meanders between the pterosaur eggs towards the device. When he reaches it, the playback suddenly stops. The eggs begin to hatch, and they realize that the music was keeping the baby pterosaurs asleep. Marshall, Will and Holly belt out "I Hope I Get It", with Chaka joining in to display a great singing voice, much to everyone's surprise.

While Marshall, Will and Chaka go on a psychedelic spree, Holly is walking about with the tachyon amplifier, which detects a signal coming from an underground cavity, where she picks up a dinosaur egg and learns from a holographic recording left by the long-deceased Zarn that Enik the Altrusian is an escaped convict who, having overtaken the central pylon and its tachyonic crystals, is planning to go on a rampage across time and space. The recording ends with the Zarn being killed by Enik. Deemed to be guilty of providing assistance to Enik, she is captured by Sleestak and brought to the Library of Skulls for a summary execution. Having sent Chaka to bring Enik, Marshall and Will rescue Holly by pushing the Sleestak executioners into a well with red-hot magma at its bottom. Enik arrives with a tachyonic crystal, whose power allows him to establish telepathic control over the remaining Sleestak, one of whom is carrying the tachyon amplifier. The villain leaves to open a wormhole between the prehistoric Land of the Lost and the modern Earth, which is the first habitable planet to be pervaded by his army of rapidly reproducing Sleestak reptiloids.

At that point, Grumpy appears to settle the old score with Marshall, who pole-vaults into Grumpy's maw and, by dislodging an intestinal obstruction, earns the beast's gratitude. Riding atop the tyrannosaur, he joins the others to defeat the Sleestak army and confront Enik. After one of the crystals sustaining the wormhole is shattered, Enik reveals that the portal will close forever. Marshall grabs Holly's crystal and inserts it into the vacant socket, but it becomes apparent that the substitute crystal will not hold for long. Enik catches Will by an ankle to prevent Marshall's departure. With the help of Chaka, Will restrains Enik and chooses to stay. Marshall and Holly leap into the portal, whereas Will is later welcomed by a bevy of cheerful and attractive girls of Chaka's tribe.

A triumphant Marshall reappears on Today with the dinosaur egg Holly brought back, promoting his new book, Matt Lauer Can Suck It! Left behind on the Today set, the egg hatches a baby Sleestak, which hisses as the screen goes black.

== Cast ==
The names of characters are given exactly as in the credits at the end of the film.

- Will Ferrell as Dr. Rick Marshall
- Anna Friel as Holly Cantrell
- Danny McBride as Will Stanton
- Jorma Taccone as Chaka
- John Boylan as Enik
- Matt Lauer as Matt Lauer
- Ben Best as Ernie
- Leonard Nimoy as the Zarn

== Production ==
The production of the film began on March 4, 2008. Only one week's worth of filming was shot using a large-scale soundstage with green screen technology. The rest of the filming took place on locations, such as the Dumont Dunes in the Mojave Desert, the La Brea Tar Pits in Hancock Park, and Trona, California.

=== Marketing ===
The first trailer was shown during Super Bowl XLIII. Subway Restaurants, which paid to appear in the film and had cross promotions with it (appearing on their cups), unveiled the second trailer exclusively on their website. JW Marriott Hotels and Pop Rocks also purchased rights to market with film tie-ins. Syfy aired a marathon of the original series on Memorial Day in 2009 in coordination with the studio to have frequent film clips and an interview with Sid and Marty Krofft. After the film's release, another marathon aired on Chiller on June 6. The majority of the first two seasons were also made available on Hulu. Ahead of the film's release, Universal also released the complete series on DVD; it had previously been released by Rhino Home Video. The entire series is also available via download from Xbox Live. Two different games were released online to promote the film. "Chakker" was available to play on the film's official website, while "Crystal Adventure" was a free downloadable game for iPhones from Kewlbox. Both Subway and MapQuest hosted online sweepstakes on their respective websites with various movie-related merchandise given away as prizes. Both sweepstakes ran from May 18 through June 7 of 2009. Will Ferrell also appeared on the season 4 premiere of Man vs. Wild, which aired June 2, 2009, to promote the film.

=== Music ===
The score to Land of the Lost was composed by Michael Giacchino, who recorded his score with an 88-piece ensemble of the Hollywood Studio Symphony and a 35-person choir. On May 10, it was also announced by Dave Mustaine on TheLiveLine that some music from Megadeth would appear in the film. Whether this would be music from the new record was not entirely clear, however during the phone message Mustaine stated that there was new music playing in the background of the message. However parts of the song "The Right to Go Insane", from the 2009 album Endgame, can be heard near the end of the film. In the film, Rick Marshall sings the original Land of the Lost theme and two other tracks (Tracks 5 and 27) use parts of the theme as well., The musical A Chorus Line plays a part in the story, and Ferrell sings Cher's 1998 dance pop hit "Believe". Varèse Sarabande released the soundtrack album on June 9, 2009 (tracks 30-32 are bonus tracks).

== Differences from original series ==
The film is a campy parody of the original TV series about the adventures of a father and his two children. While the first names remain the same, the film converts the Holly character into an unrelated research assistant to allow for more risqué humor because she is the main character's love interest. Will, instead of being a son, is a theme park owner. Rick Marshall is a paleontologist in the film, not a park ranger as in the original series. Instead of the puppet stop-motion technique used in the original series, the film's creators relied on computer-generated imagery (CGI). While the original Saturday morning show targeted a child audience, the film was intended for an adult audience and includes profanity, sex, drug references, and other adult-oriented material.

Cameo appearances were made by Kathy Coleman and Wesley Eure, who played Holly and Will in the original TV series. However, the final version of the film does not include these scenes.

== Release ==
=== Theatrical ===
Land of the Lost premiered at Grauman's Chinese Theatre on May 30, 2009, and was released theatrically in the United States on June 5, 2009, by Universal Pictures.

=== Home media ===
Land of the Lost was released on DVD and Blu-ray on October 13, 2009, by Universal Studios Home Entertainment, with total domestic sales estimated at $25,857,429.

== Reception ==
=== Box office ===
On its opening day, the film grossed $7.9 million. It performed under expectations in its first weekend in theaters, its $19 million opening was far less than the expected $30 million. The film's box office results fell far behind that of the 2009 comedy The Hangover, which opened during the same weekend. The film's opening weekend gross was about two-thirds what Universal reportedly expected to earn. It made $69 million worldwide. In 2014, the Los Angeles Times listed the film as one of the "costliest box office flops of all time".

=== Critical response ===
On the review aggregator website Rotten Tomatoes, 27% of 189 critics' reviews are positive, with an average rating of 4.2/10. The website's consensus reads: "Only loosely based on the original TV series, Land of the Lost is decidedly less kid-friendly and feels more like a series of inconsistent sketches than a cohesive adventure comedy." Metacritic, which uses a weighted average, assigned the film a score of 32 out of 100, based on 32 critics, indicating "generally unfavorable" reviews. Audiences polled by CinemaScore gave the film an average grade of "C+" on an F to A+ scale.

Owen Gleiberman of Entertainment Weekly remarked that it "has stray amusing tidbits, but overall it leaves you feeling splattered", Kirk Honeycutt of The Hollywood Reporter wrote: "Lame sketch comedy, an uninspired performance from Will Ferrell and an overall failure of the imagination turn Brad Silberling's Land of the Lost into a lethargic meander through a wilderness of misfiring gags."

Roger Ebert gave the film a rating of 3 out of 4, and said that despite the widespread disdain he had "moderate admiration" for the film. Ebert wrote "I guess you have to be in the mood for a goofball picture like this. I guess I was." Dana Stevens of Slate.com called it "an enjoyable regression to Saturday mornings gone by, as junky and sweet as a strawberry Pop-Tart."

=== Response from creators ===
At the Savannah Film Festival in 2011, Ron Meyer (then-president of Universal Pictures), said that "Land of the Lost was just crap. I mean, there was no excuse for it. The best intentions all went wrong." In 2012, Danny McBride defended the film, saying "There are the purists, who I always read about, that are like, 'I can't believe you're raping my childhood.' If Land of the Lost is your childhood, and we're raping it, I apologize. I think the show is awesome, and I think [screenwriters] Chris Henchy and Dennis McNicholas keep the mythology intact without taking it too seriously. If it was taken too seriously, it's just Jurassic Park. We've seen that movie before. This is a more interesting take on that tone."

Sid & Marty Krofft apologized for the film at a 2017 Comic-Con appearance, calling it "one of the worst films ever made", saying that they had little involvement in the film despite visiting the set.

=== Accolades ===
Empire magazine's Sam Toy put the film #8 on his best of the year list. On February 1, 2010, the film led the 30th Golden Raspberry Awards with seven nominations (tied with Transformers: Revenge of the Fallen) including Worst Picture, Worst Actor (Ferrell), Worst Director (Silberling), Worst Screenplay, Worst Supporting Actor (Taccone), Worst Screen Couple (Ferrell and any co-star, creature or "comic riff") and Worst Prequel, Remake, Rip-off or Sequel. The film won the Worst Prequel, Remake, Rip-off or Sequel award.

Award	Category	Nominee	Result
Golden Raspberry Award	Worst Actor	Will Ferrell	Nominated
Golden Raspberry Award	Worst Screen Couple	Will Ferrell	Nominated
Golden Raspberry Award	Worst Screen Couple	Any co-star, creature or "comic riff"	Nominated
Golden Raspberry Award	Worst Director	Brad Silberling	Nominated
Golden Raspberry Award	Worst Picture	Universal Pictures	Nominated
Golden Raspberry Award	Worst Screenplay	Dennis McNicholas and Chris Henchy	Nominated
Golden Raspberry Award	Worst Supporting Actor	Jorma Taccone	Nominated
Golden Raspberry Award	Worst Prequel, Remake, Rip-off or Sequel		Won

== See also ==
- List of films featuring dinosaurs
  - List of Land of the Lost episodes
  - Land of the Lost characters and species
- Land of the Lost (1991 TV series), the TV remake of the original series
