= List of Land of the Lost characters and species =

Land of the Lost is a 1974–1976 TV series relating the adventures of the Marshall family (including Will and Holly and their father, later replaced by their uncle). The Marshalls become trapped in a pocket universe populated by dinosaurs, ape-like creatures called Pakuni, and anthropomorphic reptilian creatures called Sleestak. This article concerns these characters along with other human and alien visitors to the Land of the Lost.

Travel to the Land of the Lost is almost always accidental, via "time doorways" that appear to glow and/or billow mist. These doorways sometimes appear to open and close spontaneously, but they can also be opened and controlled by Pylon crystal matrix tables and by a matrix table in the Lost City. Time doorways obey a form of temporal energy conservation law: whenever something enters the Land of the Lost via a time doorway, something else must then leave it, though not necessarily at exactly the same time. This aspect was abandoned in the show's third and final season, after new producers took over and the show's mythology was substantially changed.

At least one Pylon periodically travels to other universes, acting as a sort of "interdimensional elevator", triggered by a conjunction of the Land's moons that occurs every three to four years. One of the universes it stops at along the way appears to be the Marshalls' home Earth.

== Humans ==
=== The Marshalls ===
Rick, Will, and Holly Marshall are the initial human protagonists on Land of the Lost. Rick is later replaced by Uncle Jack.

Rick Marshall, his son Will, and his young daughter Holly were rafting on the Colorado River in the Grand Canyon when they were caught in "the greatest earthquake ever known". The river was diverted over a cliff, and as the Marshalls' raft plunged over the resulting waterfall they struck a time doorway partway down. Trapped in the Land of the Lost with only the minimal camping equipment they'd had on the raft, they make their camp in a natural cave partway up the face of a cliff they call the High Bluff.

The three of them are from California, though Rick grew up on Ford Street in Indianapolis and attended Fillmore High there. The Marshalls formerly lived in Harrisville, Indiana. Mrs. Marshall died of unspecified causes when Will and Holly were very young, and neither of them remembers her very clearly. Rick describes her as being headstrong and beautiful, just like Holly, and apparently loved her deeply. Will and Holly frequently suffer bouts of sibling rivalry, though they overcome such issues when the situation becomes difficult enough. Will is the most adventurous of the Marshalls, frequently taking "shortcuts" as an excuse to explore new territory and tampering with Pylons to determine their function. Holly suffers from a fear of heights.

At the beginning of the third season, Rick Marshall is lost unexpectedly via a time doorway in a newly discovered pylon; Will and Holly's uncle Jack Marshall (Ron Harper), who had been searching for them for six months by following the same river route along which they'd originally disappeared, experiences another earthquake and falls through a doorway into the Land. At the same time, another earthquake occurs in the Land itself that buries High Bluff along with the Marshalls' equipment and provisions. Therefore, the Marshalls move into a temple near the Lost City instead (not the same as the Builder's Temple).

The series ends without showing the Marshalls' ultimate fate, though there are some ambiguous suggestions of it. In "Elsewhen", an adult version of Holly visits via a time doorway from the future, and in another episode a mysterious "repairman" confidently predicts that the Marshalls will someday escape the Land of the Lost.

An alternate universe version of the Marshalls (who wear clothing that "our" Marshalls lost upon entry into the Land of the Lost, and who did not suffer the loss of their mother) appear in "Split Personality". It is discovered in the last first-season episode that the Marshalls were their own counterbalance; their stepping through a doorway in a waterfall is what causes the time doorway that drew them there in the first place to open. "Circle" was intended to serve as a "final episode" in the event that the show was not renewed.

=== Jefferson Davis Collie III ===
Jefferson Davis Collie III is an old and somewhat deranged Confederate artillery man who has been in the Land of the Lost for many decades. He lives in the caves near where the river goes underground, obsessively mining the rich veins of light crystals there. His only companion is a cannon named "Sarah" with which he drives away the occasional group of Sleestak attackers using home-made gunpowder; he reports that Sleestak "taste a whole lot like lobster. But then again, not like lobster, if you know what I mean." Otherwise, his diet seems to consist solely of fish and wild mushrooms. The Marshalls encounter him when they attempt to ride the river out of the Land in the episode "Downstream", but he ultimately returns to his cave rather than face the dinosaurs in the jungle outside. Apparently, Collie is turned to stone by Medusa (see Native Inhabitants section below), appearing in her garden during the third-season episode "Medusa".

Collie was played by Walker Edmiston, the same actor who later played Enik the Altrusian. The original script for "Downstream" called for him to have a rifle, but concerns over young viewers being inspired to play with firearms resulted in its substitution with a cannon.

=== Rani ===
"Rani" (Erica Hagen), though she never actually states this, is likely an adult version of Holly from an unspecified point in the future. In "Elsewhen" she arrives through an open time doorway in Enik's cave to give aid to Holly after she runs off and leaves her family in one of the lower caverns. Rani appears to be in her early to mid-20s, with shoulder-length blonde hair and wears a simple yet elegant gown made from a pale blue fabric. Around her neck, she wears a pendant with a large blue crystal set into it with smaller yellow crystals framing it. She offers three identical pendants to Holly which "work like walkie-talkies" and will allow her to communicate with other wearers over long distance. She has a scar on the inside of her right arm which she received "while helping her brother out of a difficult situation". She convinces Holly that her family sees her as "the baby of the family" and are therefore overprotective of her and that she needs to help them any way she can. She also confesses with great sadness that "they won't always be there". Rani also tells her that in order to help them she must overcome her fear of heights by looking at the earth. Holly finally realizes who she is after she receives a fresh scar identical to Rani's while fighting the Sleestak "god" in order to buy time for her father to haul an injured Will up and out of the pit. She also claims that "Rani" was her secret name for herself that no one else knew about. Rani says that she is proof that her family can escape the Land one day and disappears through the open doorway.

=== Peter Koenig and Harry Potts ===
Peter Koenig was a private in General George Washington's Revolutionary Army who arrived in the Land of the Lost some time prior to the Marshalls. Koenig and his companion Harry Potts explored the Land extensively in search of a way back to Earth.

When the Marshalls first arrive, they discover a stone pillar in the jungle where Koenig had written "Beware of Sleestak" with chalk. The Marshalls only learn much later who had been responsible for this warning, when they discovered Koenig's journal. Koenig claims to have dubbed the Sleestak thus in honor of Major Joshua Sleestak. Koenig claims in his journal to have taught the Pakuni a few English words.

Koenig met his death when he followed Potts' path into the Lost City. Koenig went into the third entrance, "where the pillars end", which eventually led through a narrow passageway into the "Devil's Cauldron". This was a lava chamber, with a narrow ledge, where he became trapped when the lava level rose, reviving the Sleestak. He preferred to await death in the lava chamber, rather than facing the Sleestak who had gathered outside the chamber to catch him. The Marshalls find Koenig's skeleton in the chamber and narrowly escape a similar fate.

=== Beauregard Jackson ===
Beauregard Jackson (Ron Masak) of Fort Worth, Texas, is a hypersonic glider pilot from 20 years in Earth's future relative to when the Marshalls became trapped in the Land of the Lost. As shown in the episode "Hurricane", he becomes briefly trapped in the Land of the Lost when Will, tinkering with the crystal matrix table in a Pylon located high on a mountain, causes a time doorway to open high above the ground. Jackson's glider was re-entering Earth's atmosphere over Ecuador, returning from a routine transit between Phoenix Port and Space Station 5. His glider's tail is suddenly severed, and the next thing he knows he is hanging from a tree by his parachute. With the help of the Marshalls, Jackson soon manages to return via the same time doorway, but the Marshalls cannot follow since Earth's end of the time doorway is 15 miles above the ground and there is only one parachute.

However, in the original script Jackson makes an offhand remark about Texas being its own country prompting a suspicious Rick to compare the currency in his wallet with Jackson's. He discovers that not only is Jackson from the future, but from an alternate timeline where Texas was not part of the United States, and oil (not gold) is the standard economic unit of account.

=== William Blandings ===
Blandings (Laurie Main) is a mysterious figure who appears to the Marshalls as a pudgy, balding man in his late 40s with a British accent. He claims to be a "repairman" for the sun (although probably just the Sun pylon) and carries an umbrella and a valise with him. Although apparently human, Blandings displays considerable—nearly clairvoyant—knowledge about both the Marshalls and the Land of the Lost and the implements he carries with him are anything but ordinary. His umbrella acts something like an air conditioner keeping himself and Uncle Jack cool during the sweltering heat of increasing solar flare activity. Much like the pylons, his valise appears extradimensional in nature and from it Blandings can produce anything he wants. He also carries an amulet which produces a forcefield which he uses to repel the Sleestak. Although a formidable being, Blandings offers hints that he was sent by and actually serves a higher power.

=== Malak ===
Malak (Richard Kiel) calls himself the "God of the Cro-Magnon" and "King of the Teutons". He is an opportunistic barbarian who lies, steals, threatens, and bullies to get what he wants. How and when he came to the Land of the Lost, or where exactly in time and space he comes from, is never revealed. He diverts an underground river into the Sleestak egg caves as a means of exacting tribute from them.

== Nonhumans ==
=== Pakuni ===
Pakuni (singular: Paku, though this usage is not consistently obeyed) are a species of small ape-like humanoids, ground-dwelling and bipedal, but not fully upright in posture. They are primarily herbivores, though they do occasionally eat small animals (an iguana-like lizard in the episode "Stone Soup", for example). They know how to create fire using flints and manufacture simple tools such as the sharpened sticks they use as defensive weapons. Pakuni display significant skill with representational art and have superstitious rituals that usually include chanting but they do not appear to understand music. They live in small family groups that construct strong bamboo enclosures as shelters. The family groups are territorial but they are quite capable of forming alliances and friendships with neighbors when resources are plentiful; they understand the concept of trade. Young Pakuni undergo a rite of adulthood in which they must steal the egg of a large predatory dinosaur to prove their worth.

==== Cha-Ka ====
One of the Pakuni appearing in the series, Cha-Ka (Phillip Paley) is the most favorably disposed toward the Marshalls. In the first episode, the Marshalls rescue him from "Grumpy" the Tyrannosaurus and splint Cha-Ka's broken leg. Subsequently, Cha-Ka forms a close friendship with the family and with Holly in particular, helping them whenever possible and occasionally visits the Marshalls in their cave in High Bluff. Cha-Ka's moments range from his attempt to undergo the rite of adulthood to facing a mysterious being who saw him worthy of advancing on an intellectual level, resulting with his gaining the ability to speak near perfect English, play an alto recorder-like wind-instrument, walk and run upright, and learn to make fire by Season 3. After being separated from Ta and Sa after the earthquake that marks the beginning of season three, Cha-Ka moves in with the Marshalls at the temple.

==== Ta and Sa ====
The two older Pakuni who look after Cha-Ka and boss him around. The exact familial relationship between these Pakuni is never explicitly stated (Gerrold deliberately left the relationship vague but describes Ta and Sa as being more akin to Cha-Ka's elder siblings rather than parents). Ta (Joe Giamalva in Season 1 and Scutter McKay in Season 2) is a domineering, egotistical and treacherous Paku (Gerrold referred to Ta as a "small, furry Hitler" in his script) who never comes to trust the Marshalls. He can be bargained with, however, and although he usually attempts to cheat the Marshalls it is not particularly difficult to see through the trick. Sa (Sharon Baird) occasionally seems to be a moderating influence on Ta, but for the most part serves as a follower. Ta is sometimes considered to be the "alpha" Paku or a "witch doctor". He has knowledge of some of the workings of the Land of the Lost, which he disguises with a clever use of herbs and phony chanting and dancing to make it appear that he controls them. For example, he understands that the "Pylon Express" only opens when the three moons are aligned and so times his own "opening ritual" to coincide with that, and he knows that the effects of the poison from the carnivorous plant are only temporary and so hurries to sell the Marshalls a "cure" before it wears off on its own. Both Ta and Sa get separated from Cha-Ka during the earthquake that marks the beginning of season three and were not seen there after, though it was mentioned their tracks were seen "ending at a dead-end cliff-face and disappearing" by Will in Season 3, Episode 8.

- Although never referenced within the series itself, the pilot script refers to the Pakuni's full names as "Cha-Ka-Ta" and "Cha-Ka-Sa" but shortens them to "Ta" and "Sa" for the sake of brevity. The youngest Paku was just called "Cha-Ka" because he lacked identity with his tribe until such time as he earned his name. Originally, there was also a fourth Paku named "Cha-Ka-Ra" but "Ra" was dropped from the story during pre-production.

=== Sleestak ===
Sleestak are devolved green humanoids with both reptilian and insectoid features; they have scaly skin with frills around the neck, bulbous unblinking eyes, pincer-like hands, stubby tails, and a single blunt horn on top of the head, and bear a resemblance to the hypothetical "dinosauroid". Sleestak often communicate with a hissing sound that rarely changes in characteristics. However, like their Altrusian ancestors, they possess some rudimentary form of telepathy as well. Sleestak are more sophisticated than Pakuni and are able to make crossbows, rope, nets, periscopes and other relatively advanced technologies. Sleestak are typically equipped with a crossbow and a quiver full of metal bolts which hangs from their waist. The Sleestak have a current population of about 7,000 according to the Library of Skulls, but there were only three Sleestak costumes available for the show's production—which required creative editing to create the illusion that they were that numerous.

The Sleestak live in the Lost City, a tunnel complex originally constructed by the Altrusians. They hate bright light and rarely venture out during the day. They also have a "hibernation season" during which they stand motionless; cool air keeps them in hibernation, and the heat from lava in a pool that the character Peter Koenig (see above) dubbed "Devil's Cauldron" inside the caverns of the Lost City revives them again on a regular schedule. The Sleestak are very defensive of the Lost City. They know that their ancestors built it, but do not know how or why. They have occasionally tried exploring beyond the chasm that separates the Lost City from the rest of the Land, but their expeditions generally do not return; they consider the city to be their only refuge.

The Sleestak have encountered many other humans who have become trapped in the Land of the Lost before the Marshalls arrive, and regard humans as a terrible threat; they attempt to capture and sacrifice humans to their god (an unseen beast who dwells in a smoky pit) at every opportunity.

- According to Dave Gerrold's DVD commentary for "The Sleestak God", the "god" was originally intended as a running gag with it being this loud, mysterious, hungry beast that no one ever sees ultimately to have been revealed as something much smaller (but no less voracious) than it sounded. Had Gerrold remained on-staff as part of Season 2, viewers would have discovered that the god was actually the Sleestak Queen.

Altrusian moths are considered sacred by the Sleestak and required for fertilization of their eggs. The Sleestak hunt them when they emerge during the night. In "Blackout", the Sleestak scheme to cause perpetual night by disabling a second clock pylon, allowing them to capture the Altrusian moths. The Sleestak plan to devour large quantities of the moths so that in one thousand hours, a thousand new Sleestak will be born allowing them to resume control over the Land of the Lost. Unfortunately for the Sleestak (but fortunately for the Marshalls), the cold of the long night also begins killing the moths. (According to Wina Sturgeon's original story for "The Hole", the Sleestak ate bugs as a regular part of their diet and used a special drill attachment for their crossbow bolts to dig them out of trees.)

Sleestak eggs are gestated in a communal hatchery. Live animals are captured tied up there for the young to feed on when they hatch. Occasionally, a Sleestak will be hatched that is a "throwback" to their Altrusian ancestors, being born with greater intelligence and with an innate knowledge of Altrusian history and technology –though not, for some reason, knowledge of the pylons or matrix operation. The other Sleestak regard these throwbacks as a threat, and so they are also sacrificed to the Sleestak god when detected. One such throwback, named S'latch, is encountered by the Marshalls in the episode "The Hole", but S'latch is never seen again thereafter.

- S'latch was to have returned in an unproduced script called "The Littlest Sleestak" in which he comes to claim a juvenile Sleestak that the Marshalls had adopted after unknowingly taking home several of their eggs. However, the little one (now referred to as "Speaks-to-Meat" by the other Sleestak) is considered "tainted" by human contact and thus deemed unfit.

The Sleestak are governed by both a Council and a Leader. The Sleestak Leader wears a distinctive pendant and Enik occasionally negotiates with him as in the episode "Fair Trade". The Council often consults the "Library of Skulls" where several skulls belonging to their ancient ancestors are somehow able to communicate with them and dispense advice.

The Pakuni word for Sleestak is "Sarisataka".

Ex-Detroit Piston and current WNBA coach Bill Laimbeer played a Sleestak before attending Notre Dame. He was a Palos Verdes High School student, and the show solicited their basketball team for tall people to play Sleestak.

=== Altrusians ===
The ancestors of Modern Sleestak were the Altrusians. Their civilization fell approximately 1,000 years earlier. (The Sleestak sometimes use the term "Altrusian" to refer to themselves and sometimes to refer only to the true Altrusians.) Physically, the Altrusians were similar to Sleestak, with the former marked by a shorter stature, their smallest claw or "finger" placed adjacent to the others on the hand, and a golden yellow skin tone. Intellectually and ethically they were very different, however. The Altrusians possessed advanced psionic technologies based on light crystals and understood a great deal about the operation of the Land of the Lost. They strove for calm emotionlessness and as a result could be both cooperative and quite callous. Also, unlike the Sleestak, the Altrusians did not have an aversion to bright light and could venture even into daylight with no ill effects.

One Altrusian, named Enik, is a recurring character in the series, introduced in the episode "The Stranger". He travels to the current time accidentally via a time doorway. He initially believes himself to be in the distant past, but upon discovering the ruins of the Lost City, he theorizes that his people degenerated into modern Sleestak when they failed to control their hate and anger. Rick Marshall speculates that it was not the presence of hate that doomed the Altrusians, but rather the absence of compassion; Enik considers this to be a cogent argument and plans to return to his people to warn them of this flaw in their philosophy.

Altrusians have a very strict code of honor: they cannot allow others to show more self-control or make greater personal sacrifices than themselves. One can thus shame them into making sacrifices. In "The Search", Will (unintentionally) convinces Enik to pass up a chance to return to his own time by first passing up an opportunity of his own to return to Earth. Enik also claims that Altrusians are incapable of lying although clearly they can "bend" the truth (or not give full disclosure of all facts) if it is in their best interest to do so. While Enik told Jack Marshall that he grasped the concept of morality, he concluded that it was "not logical". Also handed down from the Altrusians was the concept of "Altrusian grace". This meant that someone (including a human) who helped a Sleestak would be allowed safe passage to and from the Library of Skulls to ask the Index Skull a single question.

==== Enik ====
Enik (Walker Edmiston) introduced in the episode "The Stranger", is one of the original Altrusian inhabitants from before their civilization fell, though he initially believes himself to be trapped in the Altrusians' pre-civilized period. However, he too fell through a time doorway to become trapped in the current era of the Land of the Lost and discovered that the current Sleestak are actually his descendants and not his ancestors. He introduced himself as being one of the "keepers of the time portals" although it is unclear if he is referring to a select number of Altrusians tasked with that responsibility or his entire race. As such, he is equipped with a piece of Altrusian technology called a Magetti, a large crystal suspended in a tetrahedral frame that Enik describes as a "divining rod" that can be used to locate and fix dimensional doorways, determining where and when they would open. The Magetti has a self-destruct mechanism that is triggered when its user experiences sufficiently strong hostile emotions; this is a built-in safeguard to prevent it from falling into violent hands. Will Marshall inadvertently destroys it and forces Enik to rely on a different and less-suitable device (a "companion piece" to the Magetti that is worn around his neck as a pendant) to continue his efforts to return to his own time and warn his people of their fate.

Enik is quite contemptuous of the current state of the Sleestak since the fall of the Altrusian civilization, though he feels compelled to aid them because they are his future, albeit contemptible. They return the contempt, referring to him as "the dwarf", and fear that he intends to seize power over them. He is equipped with a bracelet of red crystals he can use to cause beings to be overcome by hallucinations of their greatest fear, so the Sleestak generally give Enik a wide berth. He spends much of his time during the series in the Lost City, working with a matrix table there attempting to open a time doorway home.

In addition to his shorter stature and different skin coloration, Enik is distinguished from the Sleestak in that he wears a distinctive red garment (Sleestak do not wear clothing). This garment was added to his costume when the wetsuit Enik's skin was crafted from shrank after rubber scales were glued to it, requiring slits to be cut across the front in order for Walker Edmiston to fit inside.

A being resembling Enik, suggesting that his appearance is typical of Altrusians—or possibly Enik himself—was seen in what is presumably the Lost City from the time of the Altrusians.

Walter Koenig, the scriptwriter of "The Stranger", originally named this character "Eneg", in honor of Gene Roddenberry. As noted in an audio commentary on the DVD, the spelling was changed to Enik (reverse of the Greek root word for "cinema") by David Gerrold, before the episode "The Stranger" was taped.

Many episodes refer to or take place in Enik's cave, which contains a time doorway and lies near the Sleestak god's pit, and is accessible through the central of the three entrances into the Lost City. Enik also appears in other episodes, including "The Search", "Circle", "Fair Trade", and "Blackout".

=== The Zarn ===
The Zarn, (portrayed by Van Snowden and voiced by Marvin Miller), is introduced in the eponymous second-season episode. The Zarn is a humanoid alien who is invisible except for white spots of light scattered over his surface; he doesn't even leave footprints when he walks on soft soil. His starship became trapped in the Land of the Lost while traveling through hyperspace. The Zarn has powerful psionic abilities, able to read minds at a great distance and telekinetically levitate objects. However, this powerful telepathy is also the Zarn's greatest weakness; intense, angry emotions in people nearby cause the Zarn great pain, and the spots of light on his invisible body turn red in reaction.

The Zarn is apparently a researcher of some kind whose mission involved the study of other intelligent species before he became trapped in the Land. Since the Zarn is very sensitive to others' emotions, he creates android "research assistants" to interact with them, programming them from the memories of people he has scanned. The androids are totally convincing although their hands are cold to the touch. They have histories that incorporate great amounts of detail based on the knowledge of the scanned subject, to an eerie and suspicious degree. When the Marshalls first encounter the Zarn he creates an android named Sharon who is based on Rick Marshall's memories, such that she claims to have grown up in the same town as him, gone to the same school, and have the same interests. The excessive coincidences eventually give Sharon away, however, at which point the Zarn causes her to self-destruct.

The Zarn also has a "combat" robot that he named Fred, a 10-foot-tall dinosaur-like armless biped robot with a tail, a long neck and a beaked head with glowing eyes. Fred is very strong, but fairly slow. Rick and Will destroy Fred by luring it to a mountain top during a lightning storm. The model for Fred was a metal armature used by special effects artist Wah Chang to animate Junior the dinosaur, sans "flesh".

The Zarn is extremely overconfident, arrogant, and certain of his superior knowledge, even when it actually has holes. The Zarn is also quite petty, using telekinesis to play tricks on people he dislikes and to sow discord. He claims this behavior is "research". He frequently mocks people by "speaking" telepathically in the voices of people they know, saying hurtful things dredged from their memories. At one point the Zarn claimed that the emotion of pity was the most painful one for him to be exposed to. The Zarn also appears in "The Babysitter", wherein he disparages various emotions he claims to have given up a thousand years before.

== Animals ==
The Land of the Lost's megafauna consists primarily of dinosaurs; genera noted included Coelophysis, Tyrannosaurus, Allosaurus, Triceratops, Brontosaurus, Styracosaurus, Ankylosaurus, plus the non-dinosaur Pteranodon. There are also iguanas, wild blue and red pigs, pink and blue chicken-like birds, Ancient fish, guinea pigs, rhinoceroses, large beetles (called "Tula" by Enik), bamboo, and giant varieties of modern berries and vegetables. It is unknown whether they were placed here by the Altrusians or if they came to the Land of the Lost accidentally. Rick suggests that the plants grow unusually large due to the nature of the soil.

Several dinosaurs that the Marshalls encountered frequently were given names, for example, Spike, for at least two Triceratops; Spot, for many Coelophysis; and Dopey, the baby Brontosaurus that they sometimes used as a pack animal, along with his adopted mother, Emily (who, according to Gerrold, was named after Emily Brontë). A Tyrannosaurus, Grumpy was first of the dinosaurs the Marshall family encountered, occasionally chasing them to High Bluff, being tall enough to look inside as the Marshalls ram a sharpened log they called the "flyswatter" into Grumpy's open mouth and drive him away. Holly speculates that Grumpy continued to return due to the large quantities of a ground-hugging fern-like plant she dubs "dinosaur nip" that grows in the area. An Allosaurus, Big Alice dwells around the Lost City and is referred to by the Sleestaks as "Selima", meaning "Protector" in their language due to her role in keeping predators away from their eggs. She even tangled with Grumpy on occasion whenever he trespasses on her territory. She also had her own egg that hatched into her son Junior.

There were also a number of species that did not appear closely related to known Earth life, mostly in the third season. These included a large venus-flytrap-like plant capable of consuming prey the size of a large rodent using a paralytic poison, a two-headed Elasmosaurus-like creature (LuLu), and a fire-breathing Dimetrodon-like creature (Torchy). Another species that made an appearance in the third season was a Yeti-like creature called Tappa and a similar creature named Kona, as well as a unicorn-pony called a Toe-Ki that lives high in the mountains, prevented from descending into the jungle by a guardian statue left behind by the Altrusians.

== See also ==
- Land of the Lost (1974 TV series), the original children's television series created by Sid and Marty Krofft
  - List of Land of the Lost episodes
- Land of the Lost (1991 TV series), the 1991 remake of the 1974 series
- Land of the Lost (film), a 2009 film starring Will Ferrell based on the 1974 series
