= Phillip Paley =

American actor

- Born: September 15, 1963 (age 62); Los Angeles, California
- Occupations: Actor, Karateka

Phillip Paley (born September 15, 1963) is an American actor known for playing the role of Cha-Ka in the 1974 American television series Land of the Lost.

Born in Los Angeles, California, Paley began his acting career at age ten on the cult children's TV series Land of the Lost. He was discovered for the role by becoming a karate black belt at age nine and consequently appearing on The Tonight Show Starring Johnny Carson with Chuck Norris. In 1988 he starred in a Roger Corman teen exploitation comedy titled Beach Balls. He has contributed to interviews and commentary on the Land of the Lost DVDs.
