= List of Land of the Lost episodes =

This is a complete episode list for the 1974 NBC Saturday morning series Land of the Lost.

== Series overview ==
Season	Episodes	Originally released	
Season	Episodes	First released	Last released
1	17	September 7, 1974	December 28, 1974
2	13	September 6, 1975	November 29, 1975
3	13	September 11, 1976	December 4, 1976

== Episodes ==
=== Season 1 (1974) ===
No. overall	No. in season	Title	Directed by	Written by	Original release date
1	1	"Cha-Ka"	Dennis Steinmetz	David Gerrold	September 7, 1974
The Marshall family comes to the aid of an injured "missing link" (an Australopithecine) named Cha-Ka.
2	2	"The Sleestak God"	Dennis Steinmetz	David Gerrold	September 14, 1974
Will and Holly run afoul of hostile lizard men known as Sleestaks.
3	3	"Dopey"	Dennis Steinmetz	Margaret Armen	September 21, 1974
Holly adopts a newly hatched Brontosaurus as the family's pet and attempts to train him.
4	4	"Downstream"	Dennis Steinmetz	Larry Niven	September 28, 1974
Attempting to escape the Land via the river, the Marshalls reach a vast cavern in which lives an elderly Confederate soldier.
5	5	"Tag-Team"	Dennis Steinmetz	Norman Spinrad	October 5, 1974
The Marshalls and Pakuni must work together when a prolonged pursuit leaves Will, Holly and Cha-Ka trapped between the Land's ruling Tyrannosaurus rex and its archenemy Allosaurus.
6	6	"The Stranger"	Bob Lally	Walter Koenig	October 12, 1974
The Marshalls meet another time traveler known as Enik (Walker Edmiston), who possesses the means to return the Marshalls home.
7	7	"Album"	Bob Lally	Dick Morgan	October 19, 1974
The Sleestaks use mind control to manipulate the Marshall children via an image of their deceased mother (Erica Hagen).
8	8	"Skylons"	Bob Lally	Dick Morgan	October 26, 1974
After entering one of the mysterious pylons, Will and Holly find that their actions have messed with the weather and created a terrible storm that is dealt with by three mysterious flying objects.
9	9	"The Hole"	Dennis Steinmetz	Wina Sturgeon	November 2, 1974
Rick must work with an outcast Sleestak named S'latch (voice by Ralph James) in order to climb out of the pit in which they have been left to die.
10	10	"The Paku who Came to Dinner"	Bob Lally	Barry Blitzer	November 9, 1974
Cha-Ka is invited to dinner by the Marshalls, but when Holly dabs on some perfume she has (leading Rick to mutter, "Our little girl is growing up to be a lady") it causes the other Pakuni to capture Holly — and draws out the land's ruling T-Rex.
11	11	"The Search"	Dennis Steinmetz	Ben Bova	November 16, 1974
When Rick is almost electrocuted by crystals, Will must convince Enik to save his life, but finds that his time doorway has settled on Earth — leaving him with a bitter choice.
12	12	"The Possession"	Dennis Steinmetz	David Gerrold	November 23, 1974
Cha-Ka and Holly come under the control of a malevolent being that is seeking more power for one of the pylons.
13	13	"Follow That Dinosaur"	Dennis Steinmetz	Dick Morgan	November 30, 1974
Grumpy's attraction to ground hugging ferns Holly has nicknamed "dinosaur nip" causes the Marshall children to dump it over a cliff, where they discover a mysterious diary that holds clues to a possible escape from the Land.
14	14	"Stone Soup"	Bob Lally	Joyce Perry	December 7, 1974
A devastating drought brings the Marshalls into conflict with the Pakuni over food, so Rick teaches them the importance of cooperation.
15	15	"Elsewhen"	Dennis Steinmetz	D. C. Fontana	December 14, 1974
After her family is captured by Sleestak, Holly meets a mysterious woman named Rani in Enik's cave, who helps her overcome her fears.
16	16	"Hurricane"	Bob Lally	Larry Niven, David Gerrold	December 21, 1974
Will messes with another pylon and opens a time doorway stranding an Earth astronaut (Ron Masak) while creating a violent hurricane in the process.
17	17	"Circle"	Dennis Steinmetz	Larry Niven, David Gerrold	December 28, 1974
The Marshalls discover that their friend, Enik, has been unable to return to his own time and that they themselves might be the cause.

=== Season 2 (1975) ===
No. overall	No. in season	Title	Directed by	Written by	Original release date
18	1	"Tar Pit"	Gordon Wiles	Margaret Armen	September 6, 1975
Dopey falls into a tarpit and the Marshalls work to rescue him.
19	2	"The Zarn"	Bob Lally	Dick Morgan	September 13, 1975
While exploring the Mist Marsh, Rick and Will come across an alien ship and a woman from Rick's hometown.
20	3	"Fair Trade"	Bob Lally	Bill Keenan	September 20, 1975
Rick falls into a Sleestak trap, forcing Will and Holly to appeal to Enik for help.
21	4	"One of Our Pylons Is Missing"	Gordon Wiles	Bill Keenan	September 27, 1975
Cha-Ka and the Marshalls discover a huge power source beneath the Land of the Lost.
22	5	"The Test"	Bob Lally	Tom Swale	October 4, 1975
Cha-Ka undergoes a rite of passage, with help from Will and Holly.
23	6	"Gravity Storm"	Bob Lally	Dick Morgan	October 11, 1975
Rick and Will must stop the Zarn before his ship's gravity drive tears apart the Land.
24	7	"The Longest Day"	Gordon Wiles	Joyce Perry	October 18, 1975
Rick is captured by the Sleestaks and blamed for a malfunctioning pylon which prevents the sun from setting.
25	8	"The Pylon Express"	Gordon Wiles	Theodore Sturgeon	October 25, 1975
Rick and Will follow the Pakuni to a special pylon that seems to be linked to Earth. Holly enters the pylon searching for her family and discovers that the pylon is a portal, rapidly shifting between times and worlds.
26	9	"Nice Day"	Gordon Wiles	Dick Morgan	November 1, 1975
Will and Cha-Ka go fishing, while Holly prepares a special meal. When Holly runs afoul of a noxious plant, the Marshalls appeal to Ta for help.
27	10	"Baby Sitter"	Gordon Wiles	Bill Keenan	November 8, 1975
Holly has an encounter with the stranded Zarn.
28	11	"The Musician"	Gordon Wiles	Dick Morgan, Tom Swale	November 15, 1975
Exploring ruins left by an advanced humanoid civilization, the Marshalls and Cha-Ka find an artifact that has a special impact on one of their party.
29	12	"Split Personality"	Gordon Wiles	Dick Morgan	November 22, 1975
When quakes rattle the land, the Marshalls encounter mirror images of themselves who need their help.
30	13	"Blackout"	Bob Lally	Donald F. Glut, Dick Morgan	November 29, 1975
The Sleestaks tamper with a pylon in order to create eternal darkness, forcing Rick and Enik to consult the Library of Skulls in order to find a way to set things right.

=== Season 3 (1976) ===
No. overall	No. in season	Title	Directed by	Written by	Original release date
31	1	"After Shock"	Joe Scanlan	Jon Kubichan	September 11, 1976
A mammoth earthquake shatters the land, opens a temporal pathway in which Rick Marshall falls and thus returns home, and brings to the Land Will and Holly's uncle, Jack.
32	2	"Survival Kit"	Rick Bennewitz	Sam Roeca	September 18, 1976
After Holly falls ill, Jack bargains with the barbarian Malak (Richard Kiel) for the medicine that was stolen from them.
33	3	"The Orb"	Rick Bennewitz	Jon Kubichan	September 25, 1976
After a new pylon turns Will invisible, he is persuaded by a captured Enik to use this ability to retrieve a sacred orb and exchange it with the Sleestaks for the Altrusian's freedom.
34	4	"Repairman"	Joe Scanlan	Jon Kubichan	October 2, 1976
The Sleestaks remove a vital crystal from the sun pylon and a strange man (Laurie Main) appears and convinces the Marshalls to help him get it back.
35	5	"Medusa"	Rick Bennewitz	Greg Strangis	October 9, 1976
A runaway river carries Holly to a strange garden adorned with numerous statues and inhabited by a peculiar woman (Marian Thompson) who will not let her leave.
36	6	"Cornered"	Rick Bennewitz	Sam Roeca	October 16, 1976
Jack, Holly, and Cha-Ka work to rid the valley of a fire-breathing Dimetrodon while Will recovers from the prehistoric creature's venom.
37	7	"Flying Dutchman"	Joe Scanlan	John Cutts	October 23, 1976
The lone captain of a sailing ship (Rex Holman) offers the Marshalls a way home, but harbors a terrible secret.
38	8	"Hot-Air Artist"	Rick Bennewitz	Jon Kubichan	October 30, 1976
Showman/explorer "Colonel" Roscoe T. Post (David Healy) arrives in a balloon from 1920. While the Marshalls work to repair his craft, the Colonel has designs on Cha-Ka.
39	9	"Abominable Snowman"	Joe Scanlan	Sam Roeca	November 6, 1976
The Marshalls rescue a Unicorn given to Holly as a birthday gift from the clutches of the Yeti-like Tapa, an Albino Gigantopithecus (John Locke).
40	10	"Timestop"	Joe Scanlan	Tom Swale	November 13, 1976
The Marshalls find a temporal key that Enik believes will take him home, but the Marshalls use it instead to save one of their own.
41	11	"Ancient Guardian"	Joe Scanlan	Peter Germano	November 20, 1976
The Sleestaks are enraged after the Marshalls accidentally release a menace from the high country.
42	12	"Scarab"	Rick Bennewitz	Ian Martin	November 27, 1976
Cha-Ka suddenly becomes hostile towards his friends after being bitten by a powerful beetle; he steals the Skull of Wisdom and frames the Marshalls for the theft while baiting Grumpy to attack them.
43	13	"Medicine Man"	Joe Scanlan	Jon Kubichan	December 4, 1976
The Marshalls convince Lone Wolf (Ned Romero) of the Nez Perce tribe and Captain Diggs (Gregory Walcott) of the U.S. Cavalry that the two must learn to work together if they hope to survive and possibly return to 1877. This wasn't written as a series finale, so Will and Holly Marshall are never seen escaping from the Land of the Lost, although an alternate version of them and their father did return to Earth in the final episode of Season 1.

== See also ==
- Land of the Lost (1974 TV series), the original children's television series created by Sid and Marty Krofft
  - Land of the Lost characters and species
- Land of the Lost (1991 TV series), the 1991 remake of the 1974 series
- Land of the Lost (film), a 2009 film starring Will Ferrell based on the 1974 series
