= Bob Lally =

American football player (born 1952)

No. 58
- Position: Linebacker

Personal information
- Born: February 12, 1952 (age 74); Hoboken, New Jersey, U.S.
- Listed height: 6 ft 2 in (1.88 m)
- Listed weight: 230 lb (104 kg)

Career information
- High school: Bergen Catholic (Oradell, New Jersey)
- College: Cornell
- NFL draft: 1974: 9th round, 234 (by the Miami Dolphins)th overall pick

Career history
- Memphis Southmen (1974-1975); Green Bay Packers (1976)

Awards and highlights
- 2× First-team All-East (1972, 1973); Second-team All-East (1971); Cornell Athletic Hall of Fame (1982)
- Stats at Pro Football Reference

Robert Michael Lally (born February 12, 1952) is an American former professional football player who was a linebacker in the National Football League (NFL) and the World Football League (WFL). Lally played college football for the Cornell Big Red and served as team captain. He was a First-team Selection to the Silver Anniversary All-Ivy Football Team (1971), a Cornell Hall of Fame Inductee (1982) and was selected to the Cornell All-Time Football Team (1887–2003). At Cornell, Lally was also President of the Red Key Society and was a member of the Quill and Dagger Society. He played prep football for Bergen Catholic High School in Oradell, New Jersey, where he was inducted into the Hall of Fame (1991).

Lally was selected in the ninth round by the Miami Dolphins in the 1974 NFL draft and the Memphis Southmen of the WFL. He signed with the Southmen where he was the '75 team captain and played MLB with teammates Larry Csonka, Jim Kiick, Paul Warfield, Danny White, and John Huarte for the two years the league existed (1974–1975). In 1976, Lally signed with the NFL's Green Bay Packers. Lally played for the Packers for one season, in 1976.
