= Land of the Lost (1974 TV series) =

1974–76 American children's television series

- The title sequence and the logo
- Genre: Children's television series; Adventure; Drama; Science fiction
- Created by: David Gerrold (uncredited)
- Developed by: Sid & Marty Krofft and Allan Foshko
- Starring: Wesley Eure; Kathy Coleman; Spencer Milligan; Phillip Paley; Ron Harper
- Theme music composer: Linda Laurie
- Composers: Jimmie Haskell; Michael Lloyd (arranged by John D'Andrea) (season 2); Wayne Osmond (season 3)
- Country of origin: United States
- No. of seasons: 3
- No. of episodes: 43 (list of episodes)

Production
- Running time: 27 minutes
- Production companies: Sid & Marty Krofft Television Productions

Original release
- Network: NBC
- Release: September 7, 1974 – December 4, 1976

Related
- Land of the Lost (1991 remake series)

Land of the Lost is an American children's adventure television series created (though uncredited) by David Gerrold and produced by Sid and Marty Krofft, who co-developed the series with Allan Foshko. It is a live-action show mixed with stop-motion animated dinosaurs, originally aired on Saturday mornings from 1974 to 1976, on the NBC television network. CBS used it as a summer replacement series from June 22 to December 28, 1985, and June 2 to September 5, 1987. It has since become a 1970s American cult classic. Krofft Productions remade the series in 1991, and adapted it into a feature film in 2009.

== Overview ==
Land of the Lost details the adventures of the Marshall family (father Rick and his children Will and Holly), who are trapped in an alternate universe or time warp inhabited by dinosaurs, a primate-like people called Pakuni, and aggressive humanoid/lizard creatures (described as similar to insects) called Sleestak. The episode storylines focus on the family's efforts to survive and find a way back to their own world, but the exploration of the exotic inhabitants of the Land of the Lost is also an ongoing part of the story.

An article on renewed studio interest in feature-film versions of Land of the Lost and H.R. Pufnstuf commented that "decision-makers in Hollywood, and some big-name stars, have personal recollections of plopping down on the family-room wall-to-wall shag sometime between 1969 and 1974 to tune in to multiple reruns of the Kroffts' Saturday morning live-action hits," and quoting Marty Krofft as saying that the head of Universal Studios, Ronald Meyer, and leaders at Sony Pictures all had been fans of Krofft programs.

A number of well-respected writers in the science-fiction field contributed scripts to the series (mostly in the first and second seasons), including Larry Niven, Theodore Sturgeon, Ben Bova, and Norman Spinrad, and a number of people involved with Star Trek, such as D.C. Fontana, Walter Koenig, and David Gerrold. Gerrold, Niven, and Fontana also contributed commentaries to the DVD of the first season.

The prolific Krofft team was influential in live-action children's television, producing many shows that were oddly formatted, highly energetic, and filled with special effects, with most of them following a "stranger in a strange land" storyline. Most of these shows were comedic in nature, but Land of the Lost was considerably more serious, especially during its first season, though as the series progressed, the dramatic tone diminished.

=== Plot and format ===
The Marshalls are brought to the mysterious world by means of a dimensional portal, a device used frequently throughout the series and a major part of its internal mythology. This portal opens when they are swept down a gigantic 1,000 feet (300 m) waterfall after being caught up in the world's largest earthquake on one of their scheduled trips. In "Circle", which explains the time paradox, this portal is actually opened by Rick Marshall himself while in Enik's cave, as a way for the current Marshalls to return to Earth, resolving the paradox and allowing Enik also to return to his time.

Outfitted only for a short camping trip, the resourceful family from California takes shelter in a natural cave and improvises the provisions and tools that they need to survive. Their most common and dangerous encounters are with dinosaurs, particularly a Tyrannosaurus rex they nickname "Grumpy" which frequents the location of their cave. Many of the dinosaurs are herbivores, however, and pose no threat to the Marshalls unless unintentionally provoked. One is a particularly tame young brontosaurus which Holly looks on as a pet and nicknames "Dopey".

They also encounter the mostly hostile Sleestak (a race of reptilian humanoids/insectoid), and the primate-like creatures called Pakuni (one of whom, Cha-Ka, they befriend), as well as a variety of dangerous creatures, strange geography and unfamiliar technology.

The main goal of the three is to find a way to return home. They are occasionally aided in this by the Altrusian castaway Enik.

At the start of the third season, Rick Marshall (played by Spencer Milligan) abruptly disappears trying to use one of the pylons to get home, leaving his children behind; his disappearance is explained to having been accidentally returned to Earth alone. He is however immediately replaced by his brother, Jack, who stumbled on his niece and nephew after having embarked on a search of his own to find them.

Though the term "time doorway" is used throughout the series, Land of the Lost is not meant to portray an era in Earth's history, but rather an enigmatic zone whose place and time are unknown. Indeed, within the first few minutes of the pilot, the father tells his children that he spotted three moons in the sky. The original creators of these time portals were thought to be the ancestors of the Sleestak, called Altrusians, though later episodes raised some questions about this.

Many aspects of the Land of the Lost, including the time doorways and environmental processes, were controlled by Pylons, metallic obelisk-shaped booths that were larger on the inside than the outside and housed matrix tables—stone tables studded with a grid of colored crystals. Uncontrolled time doorways result in the arrival of a variety of visitors and castaways in the land.

== Cast ==
- Wesley Eure (credited in season 1–2 as "Wesley") as Will Marshall
- Kathy Coleman as Holly Marshall
- Spencer Milligan as Rick Marshall (seasons 1 and 2)
- Philip Paley (season 1–2 recurring; season 3 starring) as Cha-Ka
- Walker Edmiston (seasons 1–3 recurring) as Enik
- Ron Harper (season 3) as Uncle Jack Marshall

== Production ==
Land of the Lost is notable for its epic-scale concept, which suggested an expansive world with many fantastic forms of life and mysterious technology, all created on a children's series' limited production budget. To support the internal mythology, linguist Victoria Fromkin was commissioned to create a special language for the Pakuni, which she based on the sounds of West African speech and attempted to build into the show in a gradual way that would allow viewers to learn the language over the course of many episodes. The series' intention was to create a realistic fantasy world, albeit relying heavily on children's acceptance of minor inconsistencies.

In a 1999 interview, first-season story editor and writer David Gerrold claimed that he largely created the show based on photographs of various science-fiction topoi that were bound together in a book and given him by Sid Krofft and Allan Foshko.

It was a marked departure from the Krofft team's previous work, which mostly featured extremely stylized puppets and sets such as those in H.R. Pufnstuf and Lidsville.

The series for the first two seasons was shot on a modular indoor soundstage at General Service Studios in Hollywood, and made economical use of a small number of sets and scenic props that were rearranged frequently to suggest the ostensibly vast jungles, ancient cities, and cave systems. As is traditional in many effect scenes, miniatures or scale-version settings were used for insertion of live-action scenes. Additional locations were often rendered using scale miniatures and chroma key.

Spencer Milligan departed the show at the beginning of its third season for financial reasons. In addition to a salary increase, he believed the rest of the cast and he should receive compensation for using their images on various merchandise (mostly rack toys by Larami, including a generic pack of toy dinosaurs believed to originate in Taiwan), but also a coloring book from Whitman Publishing, a Little Golden Book, View-Master reels and a Milton Bradley board game. His character, Rick Marshall, was replaced by his brother Jack, played by Ron Harper, with a stand-in wearing a wig with his back to the camera portraying Rick for a brief scene being transported home.

Nonhuman characters were portrayed by actors in latex rubber suits or heavy creature makeup. Dinosaurs in the series were created using a combination of stop motion animation miniatures, rear-projection film effects, and occasional hand puppets for close-ups of dinosaur heads. The series marked a rare example of matting filmed stop-motion sequences with videotape live action, so as to avoid the telltale blue 'fringe' produced in matting with less exacting processes. Though this occasionally worked very well, the difference in lighting between the video and film sequences sometimes brought inadvertent attention to the limitations of the process.

Special-effects footage was frequently reused. Additional visual effects were achieved using manual film overlay techniques, the low-tech ancestor to later motion control photography.

== Release ==
The series was originally shown by NBC on Saturday mornings, along with primarily animated shows for children. It later aired in daily syndication from 1978 to 1985 as part of the "Krofft Superstars" package. In 1985, it returned to late Saturday mornings on CBS as a replacement for the canceled Pryor's Place (also a Krofft production) followed by another brief return to CBS in the summer of 1987. It was later shown in reruns on the Sci Fi Channel in the 1990s. Reruns of this series were aired on Saturday mornings on MeTV and are streamed online at any time on their website.

=== Home media ===
From 2004 to 2005, Rhino Entertainment held the rights to the show, and released seasons one through three, and a complete series package, with several bonus features, including commentaries, on all of the releases. The DVDs of the series earned a Saturn nomination for best retro TV series release in 2004.

On May 26, 2009, Universal Studios released two complete series releases, one in original packaging, and the other enclosed in a reproduction of the Land of the Lost vintage '70s lunchbox; the only bonus feature was a look at the film starring Will Ferrell. On October 13, 2009, Universal released the three seasons individually; the DVDs are identical to Universal's Complete Series Boxes. (However, the Region 4 version of the 2009 box set does include the commentaries and interviews, but not the look at the Ferrell film.) The series is also available in digital media format.

== Remakes ==
With a run of 43 episodes (nearly double the 22 episodes expected for a children's program in the era to be sold into reruns), the show received a long afterlife in syndicated reruns. Based on that success, a remake of the series began in 1991, ran for two seasons, and likewise was rerun for several years after.

In 2009, a feature film was released, which parodied the original series for adult audiences. It was directed by Brad Silberling and starred comedian Will Ferrell, with the Krofft brothers serving as co-producers.

In 2015, Sid and Marty Krofft reportedly were working on a reboot to Land of the Lost following what they called "that other movie". In a 2018 podcast interview with both Sid and Marty Krofft, they reconfirmed that they were still working on an updated remake of Land of the Lost and that this time it would be an hour-long series. Marty Krofft died in 2023 before the series entered production, with Sid following in 2026.

On June 17, 2025 it was announced that a reboot was in the early stages of development at Netflix, in partnership with Legendary TV.
