= Winged monkeys =

Fictional characters from the Wizard of Oz

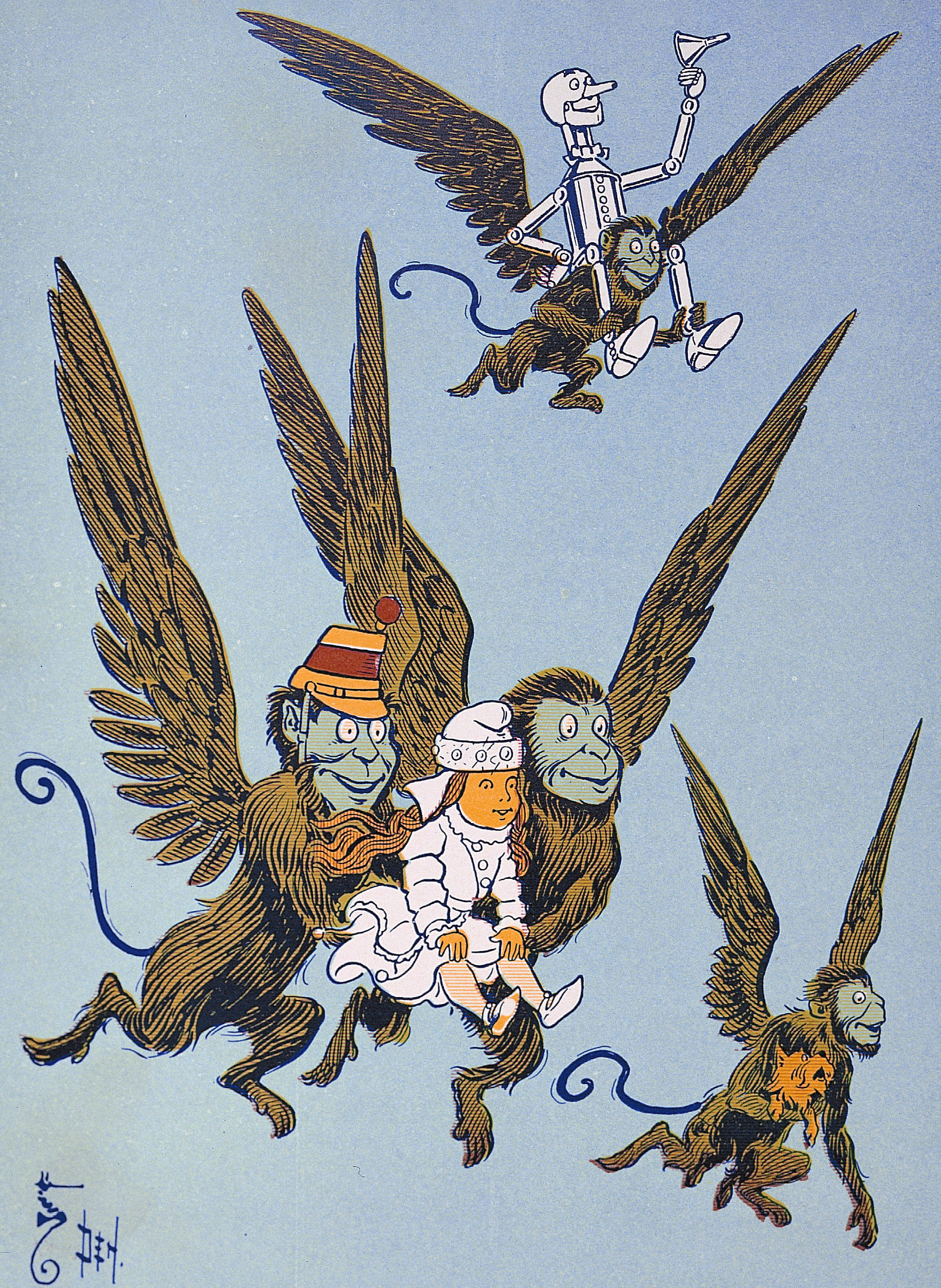
"The monkeys caught Dorothy in their arms and flew away with her"—illustration by W. W. Denslow in The Wonderful Wizard of Oz (1900)

Winged monkeys are fictional characters that first appeared in the 1900 children's novel The Wonderful Wizard of Oz, written by the American author L. Frank Baum. They are described as jungle monkeys with bird-like feathered wings. They are playful, intelligent, and speak English. They are initially under the control of the Wicked Witch of the West, but are later controlled by the protagonist, Dorothy Gale. They lift Dorothy and fly her to two distant locations.

The Winged Monkeys next appeared in the 1939 musical film adaption of the novel, The Wizard of Oz. In the film they have a much smaller role than in the book, and do not speak (or at least were never given any dialogue), but it was their first appearance in an Oz-based film. After 1939, similar characters have appeared in numerous books, films, computer games and other popular media.

The now widely used but inaccurate term flying monkey has been adopted in psychology, referring to someone who performs enabling work on behalf of an abusive person. This does not really fit with the depiction in the book, where the avian simians are under the magic spell of the Golden Cap, and must obey its wearer.

== Wizard of Oz ==
=== The Wonderful Wizard of Oz book (1900) ===
The Winged Monkeys started as free creatures living in the jungles of the fictional Land of Oz from the children's fiction novel The Wonderful Wizard of Oz. They were a rather carefree but mischievous bunch, until their king, as a prank, tossed Quelala, a richly dressed human friend of theirs into a deep river, ruining his velvet costume. His fiancée, a princess named Gayelette, was furious since this was their wedding day. She had ruled part of Oz's northern quadrant, Gillikin Country, and was a sorceress. As punishment for the prank, she enslaved them and made them obey the Golden Cap. Any wearer of the cap could make three demands of the monkeys. Later, this cap fell into the hands of the Wicked Witch of the West, who used it to make the Monkeys help her in conquering Oz's western quadrant (the Winkie Country), enslave the native Winkies, and drive the Wizard of Oz out of her territory when he attempted to overthrow her.

After the fictional character Dorothy Gale melted the Wicked Witch, she put on the cap, unaware of its power. When she learns its power, she uses it to influence the Winged Monkeys to transport her and her companions to the Emerald City, during which journey the Monkey King tells Dorothy the story of how they were enslaved by Gayelette. Then Dorothy asked them to carry her back to Kansas, but the Winged Monkeys could not leave the magical realm of Oz; thus the second request was wasted. Dorothy's third and final request was for them to carry her and her company over the rocky mountains inhabited by the Hammer-Heads, who would not let them pass over their turf.

Dorothy ends up handing the Golden Cap over to the character Glinda, the beautiful Good Witch of the South. Glinda then ordered the winged monkeys to carry Dorothy's companions back to their new homes in Oz after Dorothy's departure, and then to simply cease to bother people and not play pranks on them anymore. She then gave the Winged Monkeys the cap as their own, breaking the curse and setting them free.

=== The Wizard of Oz film (1939) ===
In the 1939 film The Wizard of Oz, the Monkeys are intelligent enough to obey commands, but do not speak as they do in the book. They abduct Dorothy and her dog Toto and dismantle the Scarecrow, but do nothing to the Tin Man or the Cowardly Lion, leaving them free to put the Scarecrow back together and rescue Dorothy. There is no mention of any three wishes in the film, suggesting that the Monkeys serve the witch out of fear, although the Golden Cap is seen briefly. The analogue to the Monkey King, one Nikko, whose wings have been clipped, is played by dwarf performer Pat Walshe. He is seen in several sequences, including when he is ordered by the Witch to throw Toto in a river; an order that Dorothy prevents him from carrying out. Nikko is also shown with the Witch as she angrily throws down the hour glass after the Scarecrow, Tin Woodman, and Cowardly Lion rescue Dorothy, and once more after the Witch has melted. His name is shown only in the credits, as "Nikko" is never spoken on screen.

There is only a glimpse of the Golden Cap in the film: when Dorothy and the Lion awake after Glinda breaks the spell on the poppies conjured by the Witch, she is seen watching them in anger in her crystal ball. Nikko hands her the Golden Cap and she utters the "somebody always helps that girl" line, before throwing the cap across the room angrily. The reason for this brief appearance comes from a scene deleted from the final film. In the script, after the Witch conjures up the poppies that put Dorothy, Toto, and the Lion to sleep, she orders Nikko to fetch the Golden Cap so she can summon the winged monkeys and they can take the Ruby Slippers from the sleeping girl. However, she never gets a chance as the spell is broken before she can. In the film, the cap looks almost identical to the original artwork by W. W. Denslow in the book.

The musical number "The Jitterbug" dealt with a magic insect sent by the Witch to weaken the invaders before the Monkeys arrived to catch them. The visual footage is lost, but the soundtrack survives, and the song is often incorporated into stage productions based on the movie, with extra activity for the Monkeys to perform.

== Appearances in later media ==
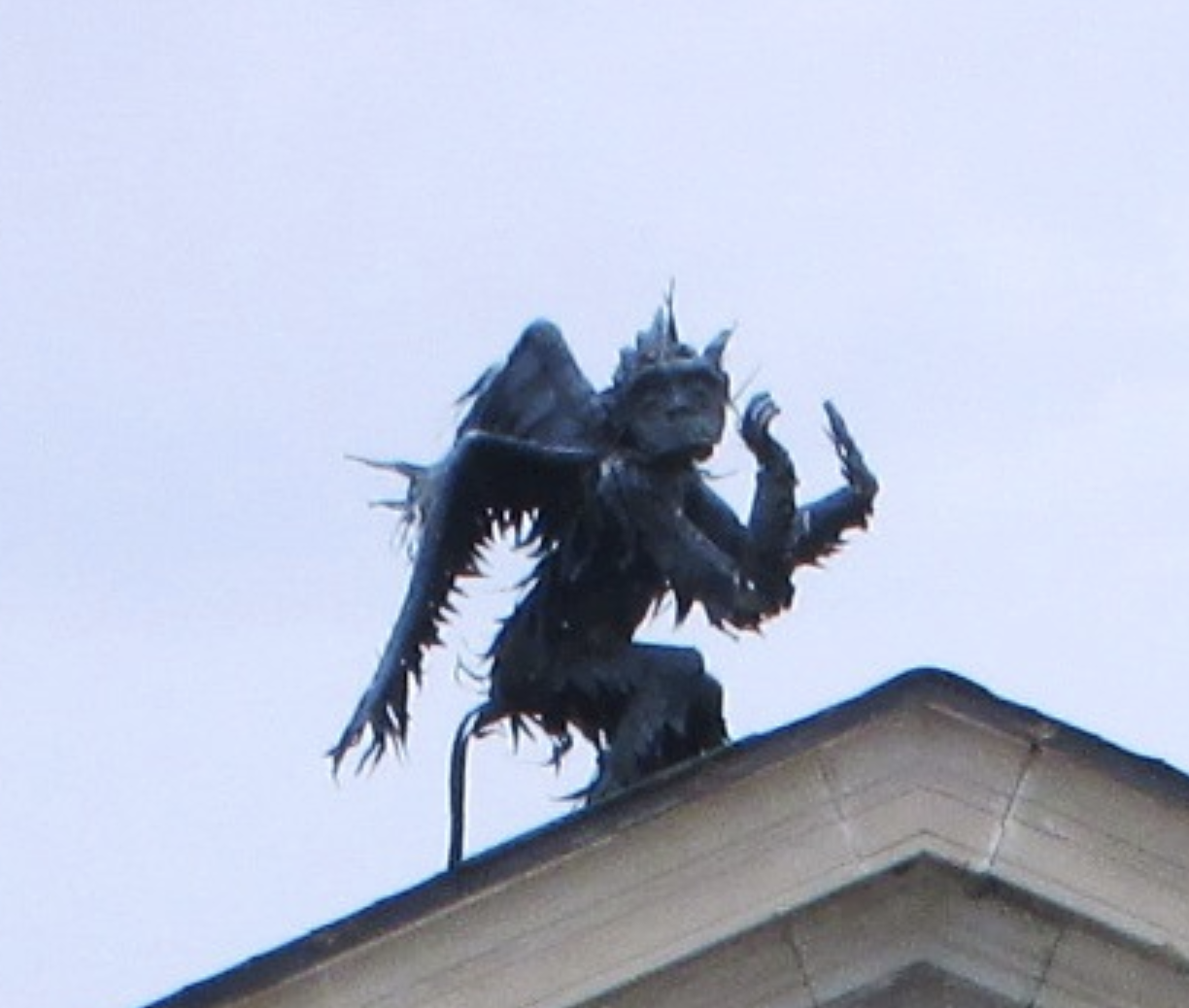
One of the four "flying monkeys" on the roof of the Union Station (Burlington, Vermont), in homage to The Wizard of Oz.

- A particularly clumsy and incompetent band of Winged Monkeys serves a resuscitated Wicked Witch of the West in the 1964 animated television special Return to Oz.
- In The Wiz, the African-American rock adaptation of The Wizard of Oz, the Flying Monkeys are a motorcycle gang, whose leader is named Cheetah, after the Tarzan character. They lack natural wings, but are bonded to their motorcycles, which bear metallic wings. After being returned to their normal forms, the Monkeys carry Dorothy and her friends back to the Emerald City.
- The Winged Monkeys appear in The Wizard of Oz (1990), with one of them named Truckle (voiced by Pat Fraley) serving as the Wicked Witch of the West's chief sidekick. He is shown as capable of speech and even gets to wear the Ruby Slippers for a brief time. Truckle leads the winged monkeys who were loyal to the Wicked Witch of the West into performing a ritual to resurrect her.
- In Gregory Maguire's revisionist novels Wicked: The Life and Times of the Wicked Witch of the West and Son of a Witch, the flying monkeys were created by Elphaba as part of her experiments on the nature of the soul and what distinguishes non-speaking animals from Animals. In these novels, most of the flying monkeys cannot speak, but Elphaba's favorite (named Chistery), has a distinctive speech pattern characterized by the repetition of similar-sounding words. This speech pattern becomes less pronounced in A Lion Among Men and Out of Oz, the third and fourth volumes in Maguire's "The Wicked Years" series. Similar situations that gave the origin of the winged monkeys are present in the novel's musical theatre adaptation and the musical's film adaptation.
- In The Muppets' Wizard of Oz, the Winged Monkeys are a peaceful group of "motorcycle enthusiasts" and are played by Sal Minella, Sweetums, Crazy Harry, Black Dog, Calico, Old Tom, Spotted Dick, and Aretha from Fraggle Rock. The winged monkeys are placed under the Wicked Witch of the West's control when she obtains their Magic Biker Cap. Forced to do her bidding, the winged monkeys ride their motorcycles through the skies of Oz, performing the Wicked Witch of the West's dirty work. After the Witch is melted in a bathtub filled with tap water, Dorothy returns the Magic Biker Cap to Sal Minella, freeing the Winged Monkeys.
- The 2007 Sci Fi television miniseries Tin Man depicts a re-imagining of Baum's world of Oz, including bat-winged monkeys called "Mobats" who are the familiars of the sorceress Azkadellia and are created from tattoos on her body.
- Flying Monkeys appear in the 2008 film Inkheart where they are summoned to the real world by Capricorn and kept in a pen alongside the other summoned creatures.
- In Bill Willingham's Vertigo comic book series Fables, a winged monkey named Bufkin is a clerk and librarian in the Business Office belonging to the government of Fabletown, a community of refugee fairy-tale characters ("Fables") living in modern-day New York City.
- Winged monkeys or flying monkeys have been mentioned in television series such as The Simpsons, Buffy the Vampire Slayer and Two and a Half Men, and have appeared or been referenced in films such as Hunter, Wayne's World, Jumanji and Inkheart.
- The winged monkeys appear in Dorothy and the Witches of Oz in the Ozian invasion of Manhattan.
- Winged apes called "Clakars" appear in While the Gods Laugh by Michael Moorcock, the second published novelette featuring his character Elric of Melniboné; the novelette was later republished in different collections.
- The winged monkeys appear in Oz the Great and Powerful. Oscar Diggs befriends a winged monkey named Finley (voiced by Zach Braff) after saving him from a lion. The film also includes Winged Baboons, which make up the armies of Theodora and Evanora. They are feral, incapable of speech, and have leathery bat-like wings.
- In the music video "Heretics and Killers" by Canadian band Protest The Hero, the band is seen performing in winged monkey suits. A newspaper at the beginning also indicates the monkeys are out of work, so they try finding ways to make money.
- The winged monkeys appear in the third season of Once Upon a Time. This culminates in a plotline revolving around the winged monkeys taking Storybrooke's inhabitants to convert into winged monkeys. After the Wicked Witch's defeat, everyone who was turned into a flying monkey return to their human forms.
- The winged monkeys appeared in the 2013 animated film Legends of Oz: Dorothy's Return (based on Dorothy of Oz) with their vocal effects provided by Scott Menville, Alan Shearman, Randi Soyland, and Flip Waterman.
- A winged monkey skin exists for Brightwing in Heroes of the Storm. More of the creatures are said to inhabit its Luxorian setting.
- The Mexican animated film Guardians of Oz has Ozzy as its main character.
- The flying monkeys appear in Lego Dimensions.
- In a Danny Shanahan cartoon from the New Yorker (September 26, 2016), a surgeon tells a flying monkey that the witch is dead by touching him on the shoulder and saying, "Ding-dong."
- The flying monkeys appear in The Lego Batman Movie as inmates of the Phantom Zone. After escaping the Phantom Zone, the monkeys are seen among the villains attacking Gotham City.
- In the ITV (and PBS) sitcom Vicious, Freddie (Ian McKellen), who incessantly insults Mildred (Hazel Stewart), the mother of his partner Stuart (Derek Jacobi), observes that one can be sure that Stuart's mother has indeed arrived if one looks out the window and sees flying monkeys.
- The Flying Monkeys appear in Dorothy and the Wizard of Oz. Some of them are on the side of the Wicked Witch of the West's niece Wilhemina and are led by Frank and Lyman (voiced by Steve Blum and Jess Harnell).
- In the third volume of Shazam!, the winged monkeys are shown as inhabitants of the Magiclands location called the Wozenderlands. Working for the Wicked Witches of the North, South, East, and West, they pursue the White Rabbit to take him prisoner. The White Rabbit runs from the winged monkeys and is saved by Mamaragan, Eugene Choi, and Pedro Peña.
- In the 2008 animated series Three Delivery, a boy turns into a flying monkey from eating a fortune cookie created with the Fu Fortune Cookie recipe, which can make whatever fortune that is written comes true. He uses the recipe to turn other children into flying monkeys (including Tobey) to make friends under the mantle of "The Monkey King".
- In The Super Hero Squad Show episode "Night in the Sanctorum!", Enchantress uses her magic to create an illusion of "winged primates of peril" to bombard Super Hero City so the Lethal Legion can seek the wreckage for Infinity Fractals.
- Although not a direct adaptation to the literature itself, the 2013 Super Sentai series, Zyuden Sentai Kyoryuger features the Deboth Army's members being themed after the characters in The Wonderful Wizard of Oz. Resentful Knight Endolf is designed with the motif of winged monkeys, whose possession of Dogold's shock restrains parallels his source of inspiration's fate of being enslaved to the Golden Cap. In Power Rangers Dino Charge, he was adapted as Singe.
- In the 2017 series Emerald City, the Flying Monkeys are mechanical creatures that the Wizard uses to spy on his subjects. They are able to record and play what they have seen.
- In the Amazon Video series Lost in Oz, the Flying Monkeys are regular monkeys with robotic wings who serve Fitz, the apprentice of Langwidere.
- The Winged Monkeys appear in Wicked and Wicked: For Good, with Chistery motion-captured by Robin Guivers and voiced by Dee Bradley Baker in the latter film.

== In psychology ==
The term flying monkey has been used in popular psychology to refer to enablers of an abusive person, such as a narcissist or a sociopath. It particularly indicates someone who does work on the behalf of the abuser, as the Winged monkeys do for the witch in the original book.

The abuser will typically use family, friends, or coworkers who are loyal and/or subservient to them as flying monkeys to subvert or attack their intended targets. The flying monkey may act as a courier of information between parties, or as someone who pleads the case on behalf of the abuser. The flying monkeys themselves might buy into the abuser's false personality, might be too afraid of the abuser to stand up to them, or may themselves suffer from a mental disorder that the abuser exploits, such as having narcissistic or sociopathic tendencies themselves.
