= Out of Oz =

2011 novel by Gregory Maguire

- Cover
- Author: Gregory Maguire
- Illustrator: Douglas Smith
- Language: English
- Series: The Wicked Years
- Genre: Parallel novel, fantasy
- Publisher: William Morrow
- Publication date: November 1, 2011
- Publication place: United States
- Media type: Print (hardback)
- Pages: 592
- ISBN: 0060548940
- Preceded by: A Lion Among Men

Out of Oz is a dark fantasy novel by American author Gregory Maguire. Released on November 1, 2011, it is the fourth and final mainline installment in The Wicked Years series, which provided a revisionist interpretation of L. Frank Baum's Land of Oz and the 1939 film adaptation of The Wonderful Wizard of Oz.

Out of Oz follows Rain, the young granddaughter of Elphaba (Maguire's re-imagining of the Wicked Witch of the West), as civil war and depression reign over the Land of Oz.

== Synopsis ==
Many years after Dorothy Gale's departure, Oz has fallen into civil war after a great drought. The Emerald City is now under the rule of Shell Thropp, the younger brother of the late Wicked Witch of the West Elphaba, while Munchkinland has seceded from the rest of Oz's union and has the last remaining large body of water. Glinda the Good, who is now under surveillance, resides on the border of Munchkinland under watch by soldiers from Loyal Oz. Both factions, Loyal Oz and the Munchkins, are preparing for war and are desperately seeking the Grimmerie, a large tome of spells capable of catastrophic results. Though the only person known to have been able to read the Grimmerie was Elphaba, it is believed that her lineage may possess the same ability. Following the events of Son of a Witch, Elphaba's orphaned bastard son Liir places his infant daughter Rain into Glinda's care, and enchants her skin so it loses its green color.

Rain grows up as an ignored servant girl, but when Glinda acquires the Grimmerie and the Emerald City soldiers begin to show interest in Rain, Glinda knows it is time to part with them both. Glinda leaves the book and the girl in the charge of the company of a traveling puppet show, called the Clock of the Time Dragon. Among this show's crew is Brrr, the Cowardly Lion, who is looking to repent for his cowardly acts over the years. He helps reunite Rain with her parents, but also learns that his old friend Dorothy has returned to Oz and is being placed on trial for the murder of Elphaba and her sister Nessarose, the late Wicked Witch of the East who has since become the Munchkins' national heroine. Knowing the Munchkins are after a scapegoat for the drought, Brrr is certain Dorothy will hang and travels with his companions – a dwarf named Mr. Boss and his wife, a Munchkin named Little Daffy – to rescue her. Meanwhile, Rain is placed in hiding at an academy for girls and crosses paths and becomes enamored with a mysterious boy named Tip. Eventually, Liir, the Grimmerie and Tip are all apprehended seemingly by the leader of the Munchkinland Revolt, which forces Rain to take matters into her own hands.

== Release details ==
Out of Oz was released on November 1, 2011, in hardcover format by William Morrow in the United States. A paperback version was released simultaneously in Great Britain.

== Literary significance and criticism ==
For the most part, reviews for Out of Oz were quite positive. Reviewers typically praised Maguire for wrapping up an epic series. Elizabeth Hand from the Washington Post wrote, "No summary could do justice to Maguire’s novel, which is hilarious, heart-wrenching and extremely poignant in its ending." Brian Truitt from USA Today praised the series though criticizing it for its length, writing: "While it meanders at times, Out of Oz is a satisfying finish to the "Wicked Years" saga."
