= Elphaba =

Fictional character from Wicked

- The Wicked Years character
- Idina Menzel as Elphaba
- First appearance: Wicked: The Life and Times of the Wicked Witch of the West (1995)
- Created by: Gregory Maguire
- Based on: Wicked Witch of the West by L. Frank Baum
- Portrayed by: Idina Menzel (musical adaptation); Cynthia Erivo (Wicked, Wicked: For Good)

In-universe information
- Full name: Elphaba Thropp
- Alias: Wicked Witch of the West
- Nicknames: Elphie; Fabala; Fae; Auntie Witch
- Family: Peerless Thropp (great-grandfather); Partra Thropp (grandmother); Romen Skarr (grandfather); Sophelia Thropp (aunt); Oscar Diggs (father); Melena Thropp (mother); Nessarose Thropp (half-sister); Sheltergod "Shell" Thropp (half-brother; novel only); Frexspar the Godly (legal father); Oziandra "Rain" Osqa'ami-Thropp (granddaughter; novel only)
- Significant others: Fiyero Tigelaar, Galinda "Glinda" Upland (Novel only)
- Children: Liir Thropp (son; novel only)
- Religion: None (atheist)
- Nationality: Ozian (half-Munchkinlander)

Elphaba Thropp (/ˈɛlfəbə ˈθrɒp/) is a fictional character created by Gregory Maguire as the protagonist of his 1995 novel Wicked: The Life and Times of the Wicked Witch of the West. She also appears in the novel's musical theatre adaptation, as well as the musical's two-part film adaptation, Wicked (2024) and Wicked: For Good (2025).

Elphaba is a reimagining of the Wicked Witch of the West from L. Frank Baum's 1900 novel The Wonderful Wizard of Oz. In Baum's novel, the Witch is unnamed and little is explained about her life; Maguire's Wicked creates a backstory for her and explores events in the Land of Oz through her perspective. Elphaba's name was formulated from the pronunciation of Baum's initials ("L.F.B."), while her appearance was modeled after Margaret Hamilton's portrayal of the Witch in the 1939 film The Wizard of Oz: green-skinned, clad entirely in black, and wearing a tall peaked hat.

== In Maguire's novels ==
=== Wicked: The Life and Times of the Wicked Witch of the West ===
Elphaba is the eldest of three children born to Melena Thropp, a Munchkinlander noblewoman. Her father is initially believed to be Frexspar the Godly, a minister whom Melena eloped with years earlier. In truth, Elphaba's conception was the result of Melena being drugged and impregnated by a mysterious traveler carrying a bottle of green "Miracle Elixir". Her younger half-siblings are Nessarose Thropp (who becomes the Wicked Witch of the East) and Shell Thropp (the future Emperor of Oz); Melena dies in childbirth delivering the latter.

When she is seventeen, Elphaba gains admission to Crage Hall, the all-female college at Shiz University. She is assigned to room with Galinda "Glinda" Upland, and the two girls find themselves repulsed by one another before growing close. During summer vacation, Elphaba assists her sentient Goat professor, Dr. Dillamond, as he researches genetic similarities between Animals and humans. Before Dillamond can complete his work, he is killed on the orders of Crage Hall's headmistress, Madame Morrible. Elphaba privately continues Dillamond's research and, along with Glinda and Nessarose, is nearly coerced by Morrible into becoming a political pawn for the Wizard of Oz. Although Morrible casts a spell for the girls to forget her proposition, they ultimately gain dominion over specific regions in Oz: Glinda (as the "Good Witch of the North") in Gillikin, Nessarose (as the "Wicked Witch of the East") in Munchkinland, and Elphaba (as the "Wicked Witch of the West") in the Vinkus.

Taking matters into her own hands, Elphaba and Glinda visit the Emerald City and present Dillamond's research to the Wizard, only to be dismissed callously. While Glinda returns to Shiz, Elphaba stays behind and commits herself to opposing the Wizard's rule. Five years later, Elphaba has joined an underground resistance group that seeks political change through domestic terrorism. She reconnects with Fiyero Tigelaar, a former Shiz classmate and Vinkus chieftain. Their meetings blossom into a passionate affair, though Fiyero questions the effectiveness of Elphaba's campaign. When Elphaba fails to assassinate Morrible at a Lurlinemas celebration, she returns home to find that Fiyero has been brutally killed and abducted by members of the Wizard's police force. Traumatized, she flees to a convent and enters a year-long coma, during which she gives birth to Liir, her child by Fiyero.

Seven years later, Elphaba and Liir arrive at Kiamo Ko, the Tigelaar family castle. Fiyero's wife, Sarima, refuses to accept Elphaba's apology for her husband's death but allows her and Liir to stay at the castle with her sisters and children. While there, Elphaba discovers an ancient spellbook called the Grimmerie and studies its contents. She develops a reputation as a Witch, giving several monkeys the ability to fly by sewing wings on their backs, and learns to ride a flying broomstick, which she uses to visit her family. In Munchkinland, Elphaba learns of Nessarose's ascension as the Wicked Witch of the East, and declines to rule the region alongside her. Upon returning to Kiamo Ko, Elphaba discovers that the Tigelaars have been captured.

Another seven years pass, and Elphaba returns to Munchkinland after Nessarose is crushed to death by a house in a storm. She reunites with Glinda for the first time in years, but breaks ties with her after discovering she gave Nessarose's silver shoes to the house's occupant, Dorothy Gale. Elphaba then confronts the Wizard, offering the Grimmerie in exchange for the Tigelaars' release, only to be told they have been executed, save for Fiyero's daughter, Nor. With little left to lose, Elphaba pursues Dorothy and attempts to assassinate Morrible once again, but finds Morrible already dead from old age.

At Kiamo Ko, Liir informs Elphaba that the Wizard has sent Dorothy and her companions to kill her. One of Dorothy's companions, the Scarecrow, is mistaken by Elphaba for a disguised Fiyero. When Dorothy arrives, she states she has no intention of killing Elphaba and asks forgiveness for Nessarose's death. Enraged by Dorothy requesting the same mercy Sarima had denied her, Elphaba accidentally sets her clothes on fire, and Dorothy douses her with a bucket of water, unaware that Elphaba is allergic to it. She melts away, leaving behind a green bottle that Dorothy returns to the Wizard. He recognizes it as the same drug used to seduce Melena years prior, revealing himself to be Elphaba's true father.

=== Other books ===
Elphaba is mentioned posthumously throughout the rest of Maguire's Wicked Years series, and briefly appears in flashbacks to Liir's childhood in the second novel, Son of a Witch (2005). She also appears in the prequel novel, Elphie: A Wicked Childhood (2025).

Despite her death, it is heavily implied that Elphaba may have survived her encounter with Dorothy. In the first novel, a recurring fairy tale is told to children about Saint Aelphaba, Elphaba's namesake, who is said to have vanished behind a waterfall and never returned. There is also a story told about a Witch who went into a cave and might come out. The final lines of the novel echo the common question asked by children after hearing this folk tale, wondering if the Witch ever reemerged from the cave, to which the narrator replies, "not yet".

In the third novel, A Lion Among Men (2008), the oracle Yackle — revealed to be a spirit born from the pages of the Grimmerie — declares that someone is "coming back" as she is absorbed back into the spellbook. Who Yackle refers to is never made explicitly clear, though it is speculated to be Elphaba, since Yackle was present at many pivotal points in Elphaba's life.

At the end of the fourth novel, Out of Oz (2011), Glinda is freed from her jail sentence by someone she refers to as "wicked" and claims "took her time". Another theory suggests Elphaba was reincarnated as her granddaughter, Rain. Evidence for this theory includes Rain inheriting Elphaba's green skin, being able to ride Elphaba's broomstick, reading the Grimmerie with relative ease compared to others, and interacting with the spirits of Elphaba's pets when she visits Kiamo Ko.

In the final Another Day trilogy novel, The Witch of Maracoor, Rain consults the Grimmerie to try and speak to her lover, Tip, but instead talks to her grandmother and is given some advice.

== In the musical ==
Elphaba is one of two lead characters in the musical adaptation of Wicked, alongside Galinda Upland / Glinda the Good. The role was originated on Broadway and the West End by Idina Menzel, who won the 2004 Tony Award for Best Actress in a Musical for her performance.

Among other changes and content limitations to make the story accessible for general audiences, the musical deviates from Maguire's novel by giving greater attention to the relationship between Elphaba and Glinda. As book writer Winnie Holzman observed in an interview with Playbill, "It was Maguire's brilliant idea to take this hated figure and tell things from her point of view, and to have the two witches be roommates in college, but the way in which their friendship develops – and really the whole plot – is different onstage." Schwartz echoed Holzman's sentiment, stating: "Primarily we were interested in the relationship between Galinda – who becomes Glinda – and Elphaba...the friendship of these two women and how their characters lead them to completely different destinies." Other modifications to Elphaba's story included the removal of her time in the Vinkus, her and Fiyero's affair not resulting in Liir's birth, Fiyero becoming the Scarecrow instead of being murdered, and Elphaba's survival at the end.

== Film portrayal ==
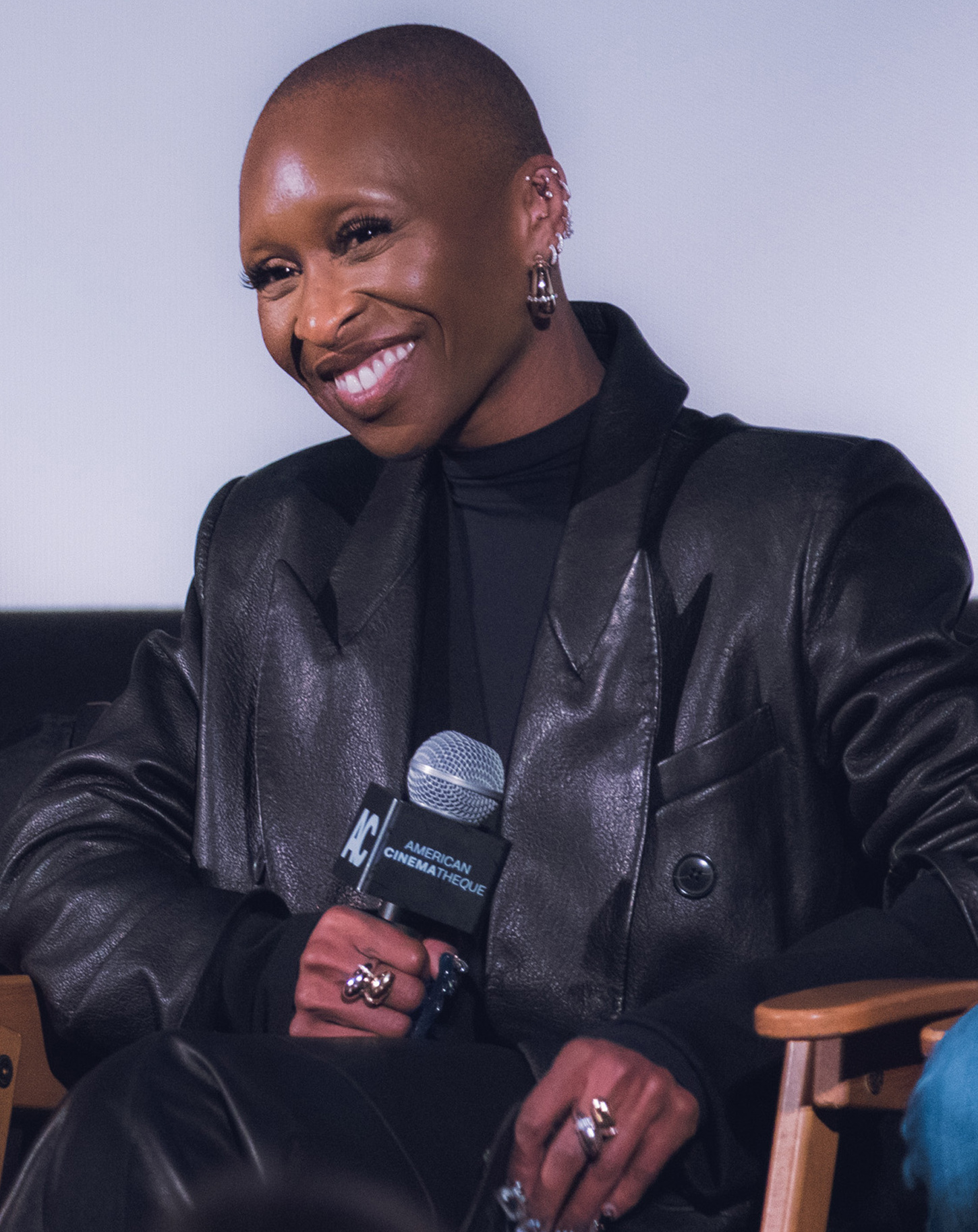
Cynthia Erivo, who portrays Elphaba in the 2024 film Wicked

Cynthia Erivo portrays Elphaba in the musical's two-part film adaptation, Wicked (2024) and Wicked: For Good (2025), while Karis Musongole portrays her as a child. For her performance in the first film, Erivo received a nomination for the Academy Award for Best Actress.
