= Mirror, Mirror (novel) =

2003 novel by Gregory Maguire

- First cover
- Author: Gregory Maguire
- Language: English
- Genre: Fantasy
- Publisher: HarperCollins
- Publication date: October 14, 2003
- Publication place: United States
- Media type: Print (Hardcover & Paperback)
- Pages: 304 (first edition, hardback)
- ISBN: 0-06-039384-X (first edition, hardback)
- OCLC: 52134556
- Dewey Decimal: 813/.54 21
- LC Class: PS3563.A3535 M67 2003

Mirror, Mirror is a fantasy novel by American writer Gregory Maguire, published in 2003. The novel is a revisionist version of the tale of Snow White set in rural Italy and featuring the historical Borgia family, with Lucrezia Borgia in the role of the Evil Queen.

== Plot summary ==
In Montefiore, Italy, in the early 16th century, a nobleman named Don Vicente de Nevada lives on a small estate with his seven-year-old daughter, Bianca, and a small staff, two of whom are Primavera, an earthy cook and a friar Fra Ludovico. The eponymous mirror was fashioned by dwarves and left in the pond to temper, where, at the beginning of the novel, it is found by de Nevada.

Life is good for the family until the day the duchess Lucrezia Borgia and her brother, Cesare, decadent children of a pope, come to visit. Cesare sends Vicente on a quest for a holy relic. While he is gone, Bianca becomes a young woman and Lucrezia becomes jealous of the girl's beauty and stealing Cesare's attention from Lucrezia. Eventually she hires a hunter to kill Bianca, who instead helps her escape from Lucrezia. The girl escapes, and runs into seven dwarves, who are looking for the eighth dwarf and their mirror. The eighth dwarf is accompanying and protecting de Nevada on his travels.

When the mirror reveals to the duchess that her plan has failed, she takes it into her own hands to kill Bianca. When she eventually succeeds, Bianca is placed in a coffin, with the now-liberated mirror allowing passers-by to view her beauty. Eventually, she is awakened subsequent to a kiss from the very hunter who helped her escape. The device by which the kiss cures her of mercury poisoning is left unexplained by the author.

== Reception ==
Reviews for Mirror, Mirror were mixed. While Kirkus Reviews called it "Every bit as good as Wicked," The AV Club said, "Too many of the well-drawn principals turn out to be window dressing, too many of the plotlines dribble out into emptiness, and too many of his elaborations amount to misdirection."
