= The Wicked Years =

Series of novels by Gregory Maguire

- Wicked (1995); Son of a Witch (2005); A Lion Among Men (2008); Out of Oz (2011); Tales Told in Oz (2012); The Brides of Maracoor (2021); The Oracle of Maracoor (2022); The Witch of Maracoor (2023); Elphie: A Wicked Childhood (2025); Galinda: A Charmed Childhood (2026)
- Author: Gregory Maguire
- Illustrator: Douglas Smith (cover art)
- Language: English
- Genre: Dark fantasy; Drama; Dystopian
- Publisher: HarperCollins
- Published: 1995–2011; 2012; 2021–2023; 2025
- Media type: Print (hardcover and paperback); Audiobook; E-book
- No. of books: 4 originals; 3 sequels; 1 anthology; 2 prequels

The Wicked Years is a series of revisionist dark fantasy novels written by American author Gregory Maguire. It is inspired by L. Frank Baum's 1900 novel The Wonderful Wizard of Oz, with elements also based on the 1939 film adaptation by Metro-Goldwyn-Mayer and other Oz-related books.

Unlike Baum's original novels, The Wicked Years is aimed at mature audiences and presents a dystopian, more cynical version of the Land of Oz than in other adaptations. The series explores several sociopolitical issues, namely the discrimination of sentient animals and racial tensions between various ethnic groups, and features many of the original Wizard of Oz characters re-imagined as antagonists or neutral parties. The first novel in the series follows protagonist Elphaba Thropp through her evolution into the Wicked Witch of the West, while highlighting the consequences her relationships and actions have on the land in her lifetime and beyond.

In 2003, the first Wicked novel was loosely adapted into a stage musical, which became the second-highest-grossing stage musical of all time. Its success inspired its own two-part film adaptation, Wicked (2024) and Wicked: For Good (2025).

== Novels ==
=== Main tetralogy ===
There are four main novels in The Wicked Years, each referred to as a "volume".

The first volume in the series, Wicked: The Life and Times of the Wicked Witch of the West, was published as a standalone story in 1995. It details the life of the infamous villain from The Wonderful Wizard of Oz, whose birth name is given here as Elphaba Thropp. The story is divided into five sections, following Elphaba through the social ostracism she faces because of her green skin, her schooling years with Galinda Upland (the future Good Witch of the North), her radicalization in response to the persecution of Animals in Oz, and her final years as the Wicked Witch before being vanquished by Dorothy Gale. The novel was successful, and was later adapted into a 2003 stage musical, in turn adapted into a two-part film.

The second volume, Son of a Witch, was published in 2005. It details the life of Elphaba's son, Liir, over a decade-long period after the events of the first novel, as he searches for his half-sister Nor and incidentally finishes some of his mother's work.

A third volume, A Lion Among Men, was published in 2008, and was the first to bear the Wicked Years subtitle. It gives the backstory of the Cowardly Lion from The Wonderful Wizard of Oz (here given the name 'Brrr') in parallel with the history of Yackle, a mysterious oracle introduced in the first novel who has an inexplicable connection to Elphaba. Their biographies overlap with the events of Wicked and Son of a Witch, with the present-day narrative set around eight years after the latter.

The fourth and final volume, Out of Oz, was published in 2011. Set immediately after the end of Lion, it focuses on Liir's daughter, Rain, as the Land of Oz descends into war.

=== Another Day trilogy ===
In 2021, Maguire continued the story of The Wicked Years with a sequel series called Another Day, following Rain and her adventures in a new land known as Maracoor. The first book, The Brides of Maracoor, sees Rain join the titular brides, a flagellant community of quasi-nuns who spend their days weaving "the nets of time". A second book, The Oracle of Maracoor, was published in 2022, and the final book, The Witch of Maracoor, was published in October 2023.

=== Other books ===
Outside of the tetralogy, The Wicked Years also includes Tales Told in Oz (2012), a short story collection exploring the folklore of Oz; Elphie: A Wicked Childhood (2025), a prequel focused on Elphaba's childhood; and Galinda: A Charmed Childhood (2026), a sidequel prequel focused on Glinda's childhood.

In March 2025, William Morrow Paperbacks published the first volume of a graphic novel adaptation of Wicked, with illustrations by Scott Hampton.

== Adaptations ==
=== Stage musical ===
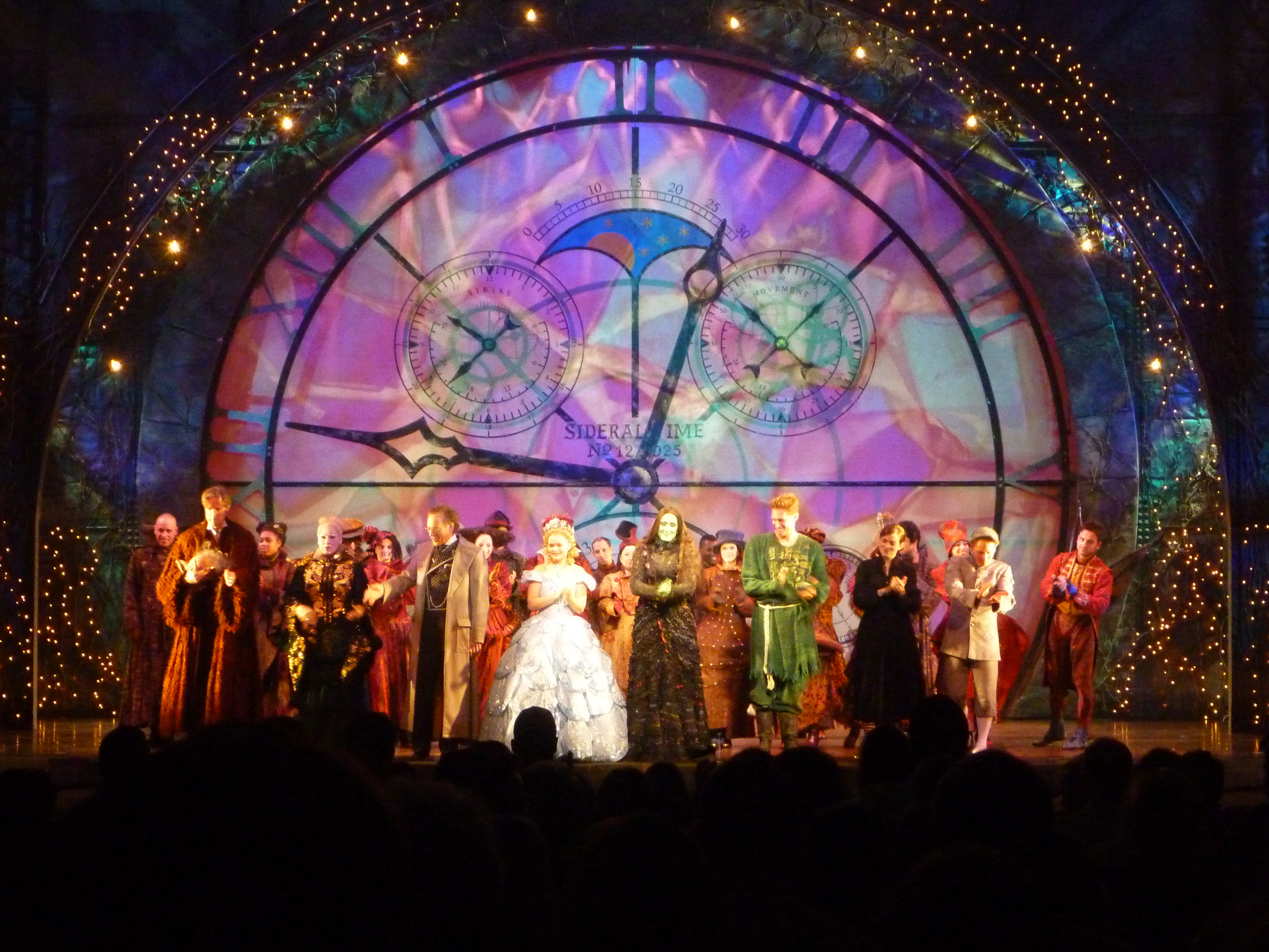
Touring cast members in the curtain call at a show in Omaha, Nebraska

While vacationing in 1996, composer and lyricist Stephen Schwartz came across Wicked: The Life and Times of the Wicked Witch of the West and saw the potential in a dramatic adaptation. At the time, the novel's rights were in the hands of Universal Pictures, which intended to develop a feature film. After those plans fell short, Schwartz persuaded Universal and then-head of production Marc Platt on adapting the novel for the stage instead, to which they agreed with David Stone additionally joining as co-producer.

Schwartz and writer Winnie Holzman developed the plot outline over the course of a year. While the musical retained much of the characters, story, and thematic elements from Maguire's novel, several changes were made to make it more digestible for general audiences, rather than the adult demographic the novel was originally intended for. Greater emphasis was placed on the relationship between Elphaba and her roommate Galinda Upland (later known as Glinda the Good), with Schwartz stating: "Primarily we were interested in the relationship between Galinda—who becomes Glinda—and Elphaba... the friendship of these two women and how their characters lead them to completely different destinies." Other modifications included Fiyero becoming the Scarecrow; Boq becoming the Tin Woodman and his feelings for Glinda continuing beyond their time at Shiz; Doctor Dilamond being fired instead of murdered; and Madame Morrible going to prison instead of dying. Notable omissions included Elphaba's time in the Vinkus, Fiyero's wife and children, and Elphaba and Fiyero's child, Liir.

By 2002, a crew had been assembled for the musical: Joe Mantello as director, Wayne Cilento as choreographer, Eugene Lee as set designer, Susan Hilferty as costume designer, and Kenneth Posner as lighting designer. Kristin Chenoweth and Stephanie J. Block portrayed Glinda and Elphaba in the developmental workshops before the latter was replaced by Idina Menzel. Tryouts were held at San Francisco's Curran Theatre in the spring of 2003, and the mixed critical reaction resulted in modifications to the book and songs. Broadway previews began at the Gershwin Theatre on October 8, before the musical officially premiered on October 30.

=== Unproduced projects ===
In the 1990s, actress Demi Moore won a bidding war to produce (through her company Moving Pictures) and star in a feature film adaptation of Wicked: The Life and Times of the Wicked Witch of the West, with Universal Pictures assisting in the purchase of rights from Gregory Maguire. Other actresses who expressed interest in adapting the novel included Whoopi Goldberg, Claire Danes, Salma Hayek, and Laurie Metcalf, and they had also been considered for the roles of Elphaba and Glinda along with Michelle Pfeiffer, Emma Thompson, and Nicole Kidman. Despite the project attaching Linda Woolverton as screenwriter, it failed to move forward after unsuccessfully courting a director (with Robert Zemeckis considered at one point) and Universal deeming its estimated budget of $35–37 million "implausible". Stephen Schwartz soon persuaded Universal to adapt the novel for the stage, and Marc Platt took over as producer after Moore departed from the project.

In a 2009 interview, Maguire revealed he had once again sold the novel's rights to ABC, which announced a miniseries adaptation of Wicked independent from the musical in January 2011. It was to be produced by Salma Hayek and her production company, though no further developments were announced.

=== Film adaptations of musical ===
Film	U.S. release date	Director	Screenwriter(s)	Producer(s)	Executive producer(s)
Wicked	November 22, 2024	Jon M. Chu	Winnie Holzman (Note: Holzman is credited twice for writing the screenplay; first as a solo writer and as part of a writing team with Dana Fox.); Dana Fox	Marc Platt; David Stone	Dana Fox; Jared LeBoff; David Nicksay; Winnie Holzman; Stephen Schwartz
Wicked: For Good	November 21, 2025	Jon M. Chu	Winnie Holzman; Dana Fox	Marc Platt; David Stone	Dana Fox; Jared LeBoff; David Nicksay; Winnie Holzman; Stephen Schwartz

==== Wicked (2024) ====
Following the success of the Universal-distributed Les Misérables (an adaptation of the 1862 novel and 1980 musical), Marc Platt announced a feature film adaptation of the Wicked musical had entered development. Talks had begun in June 2009, with candidates including Lea Michele, Amy Adams, and original stars Kristin Chenoweth and Idina Menzel as leads; Holzman and Schwartz returning as writers; and J. J. Abrams, Rob Marshall, James Mangold, and Ryan Murphy as directors. In June 2016, Universal announced Stephen Daldry to be directing the film and issued a tentative release date of December 20, 2019.

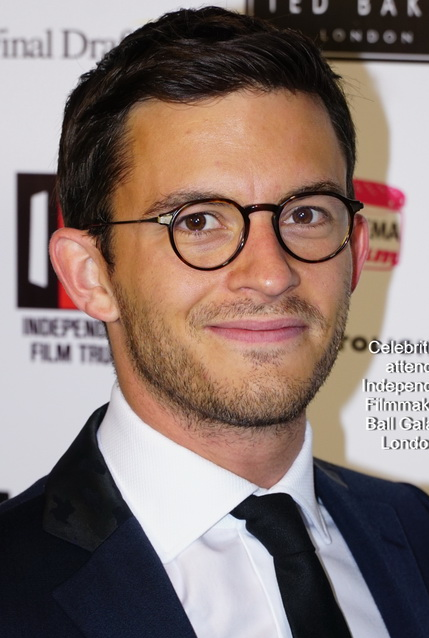
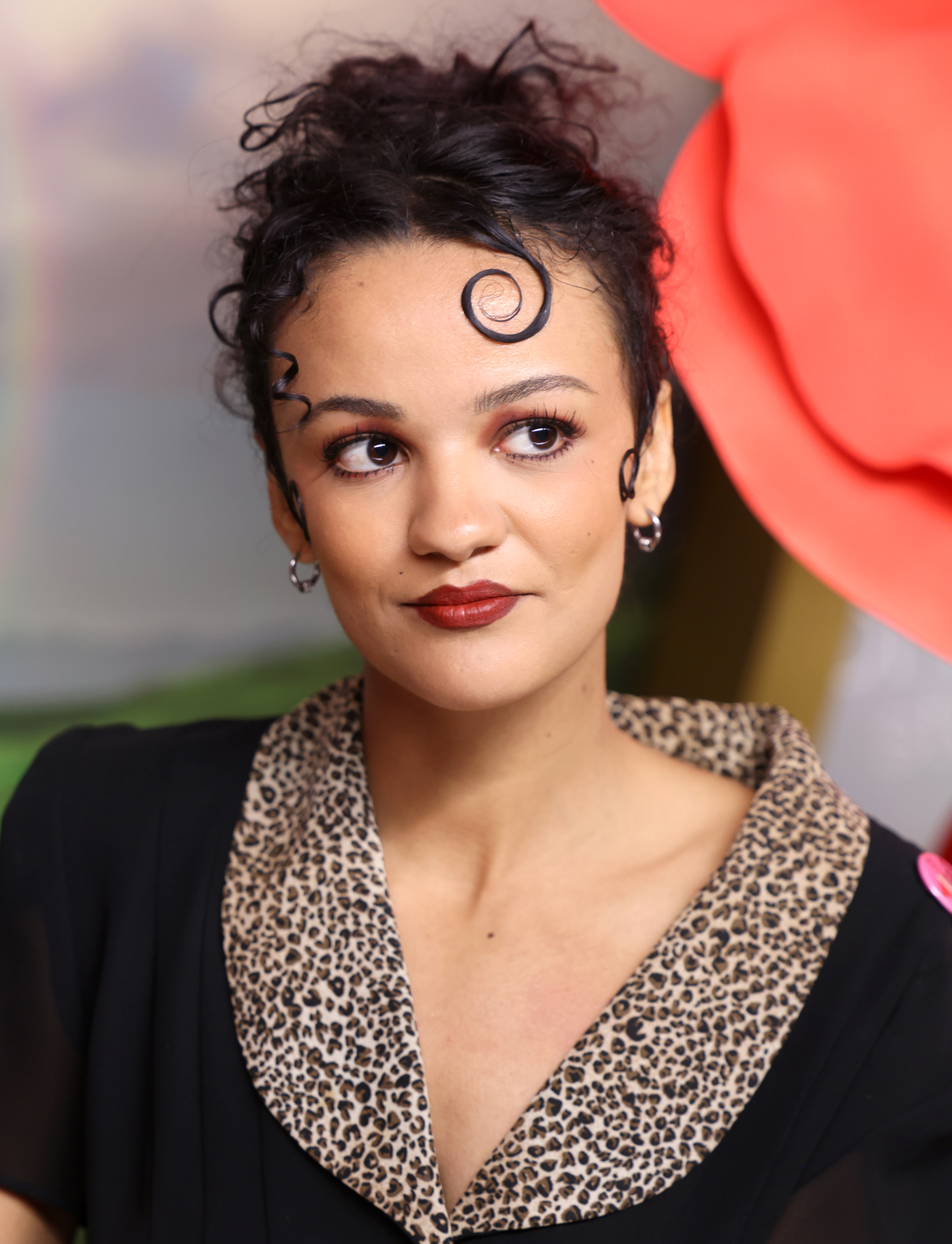
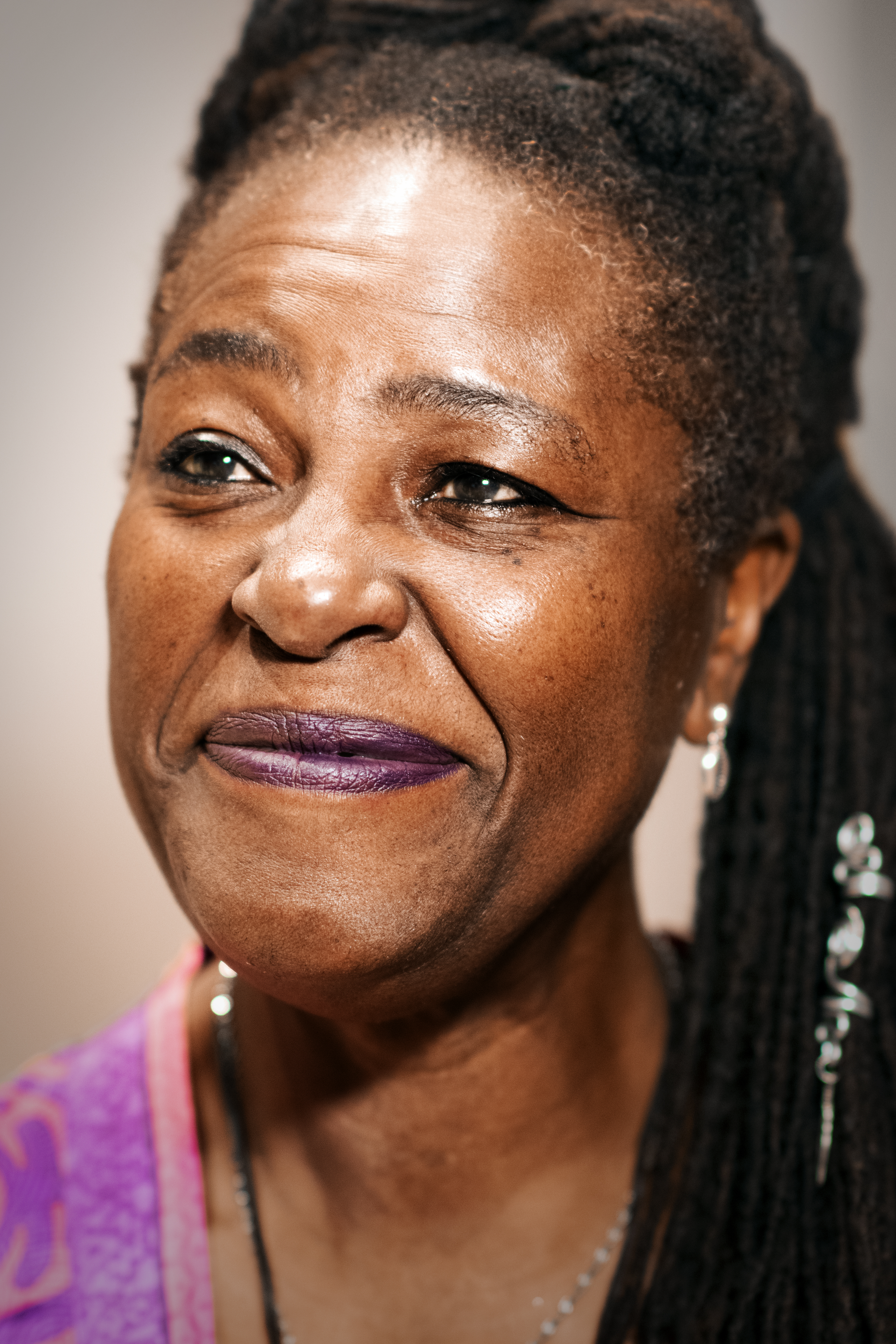
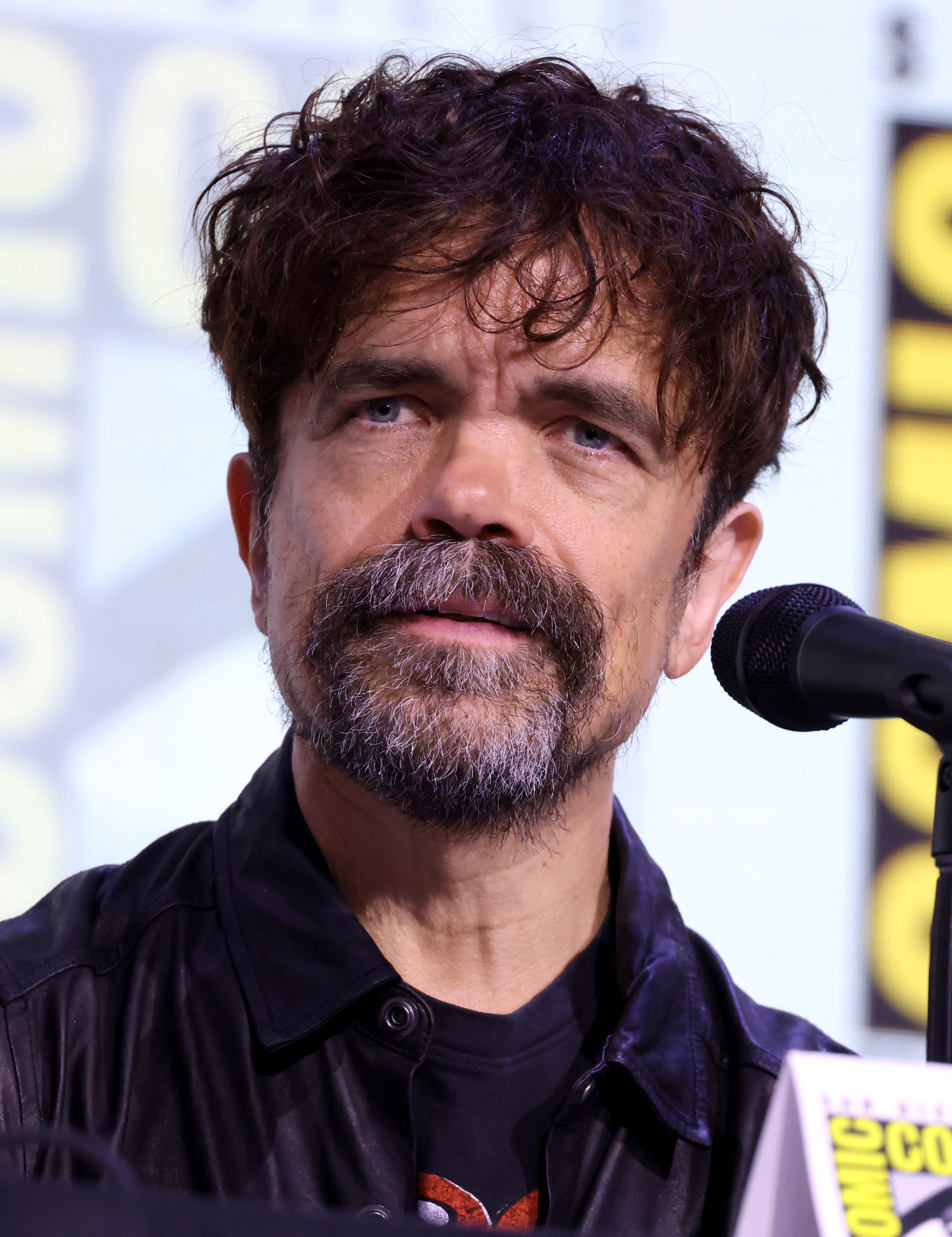
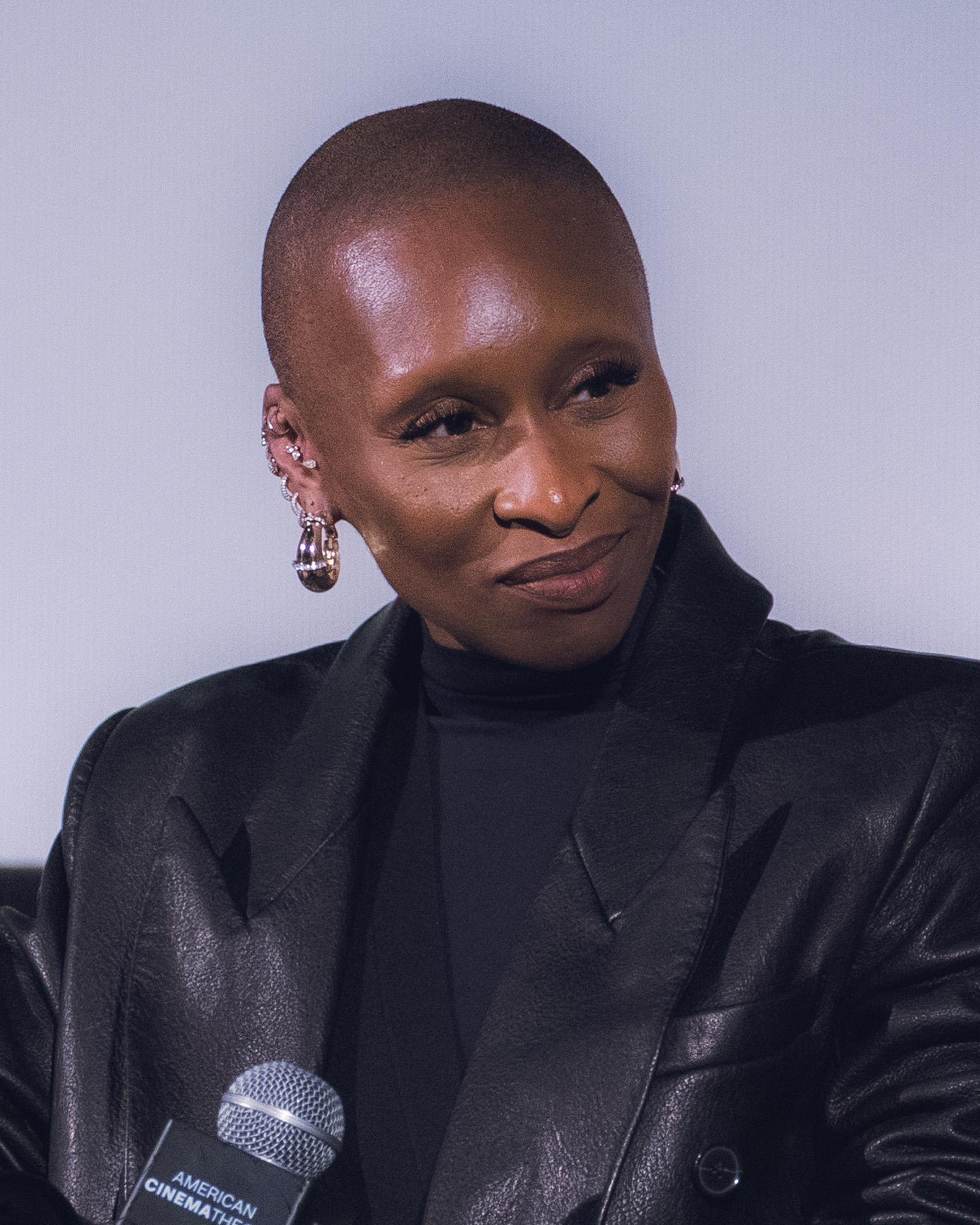
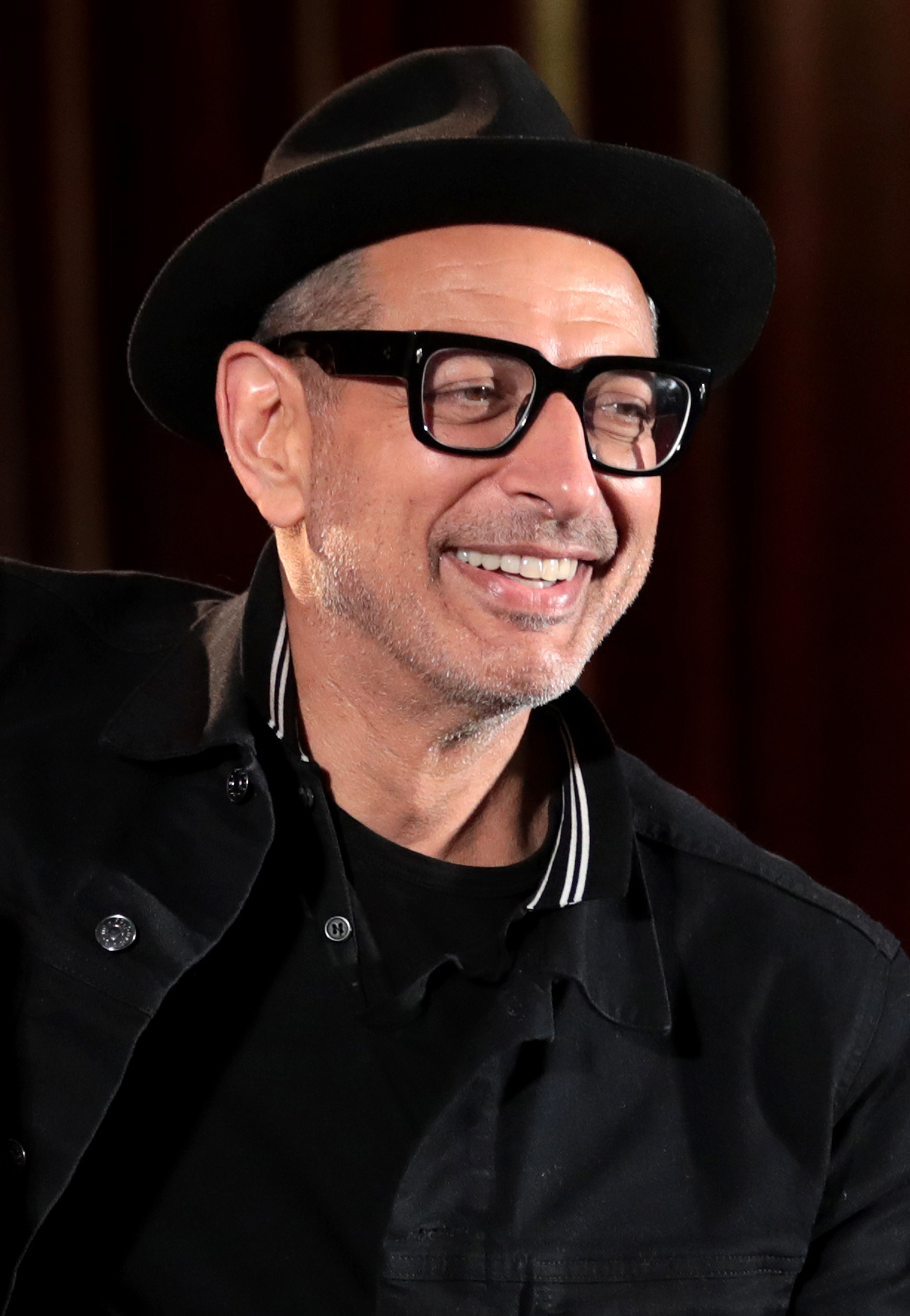
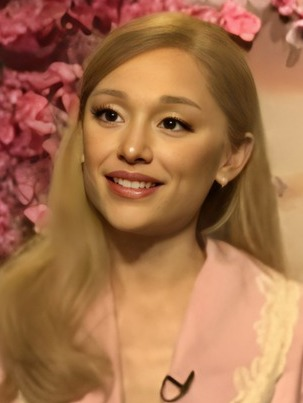
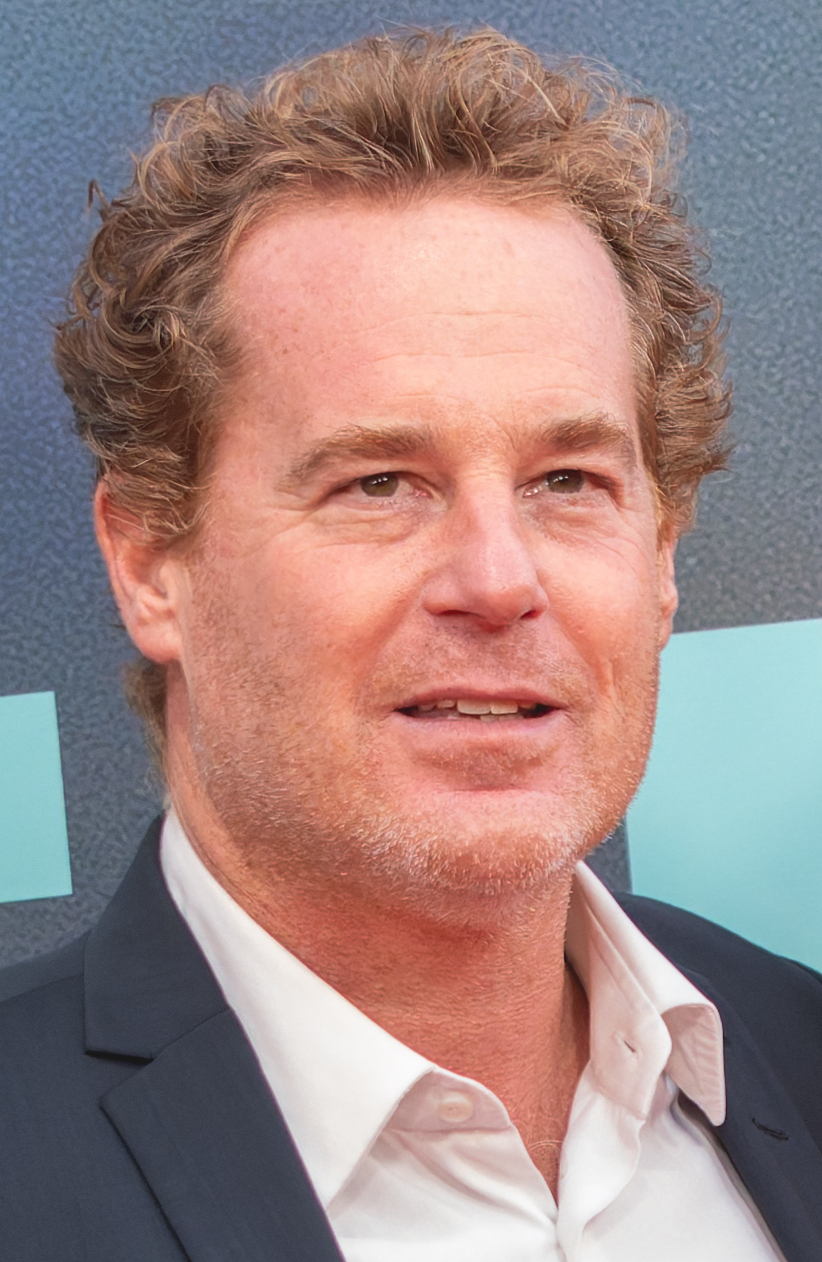
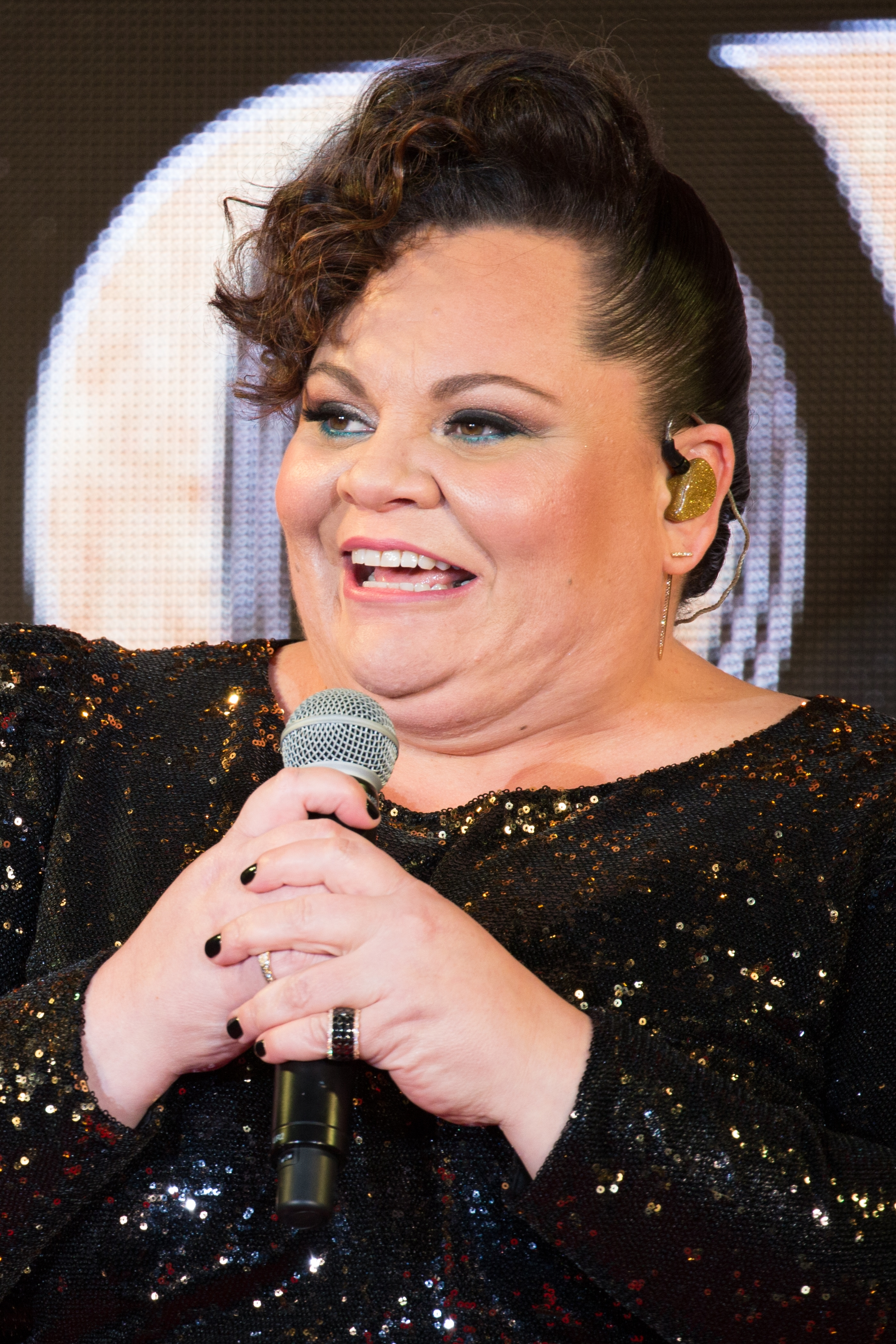
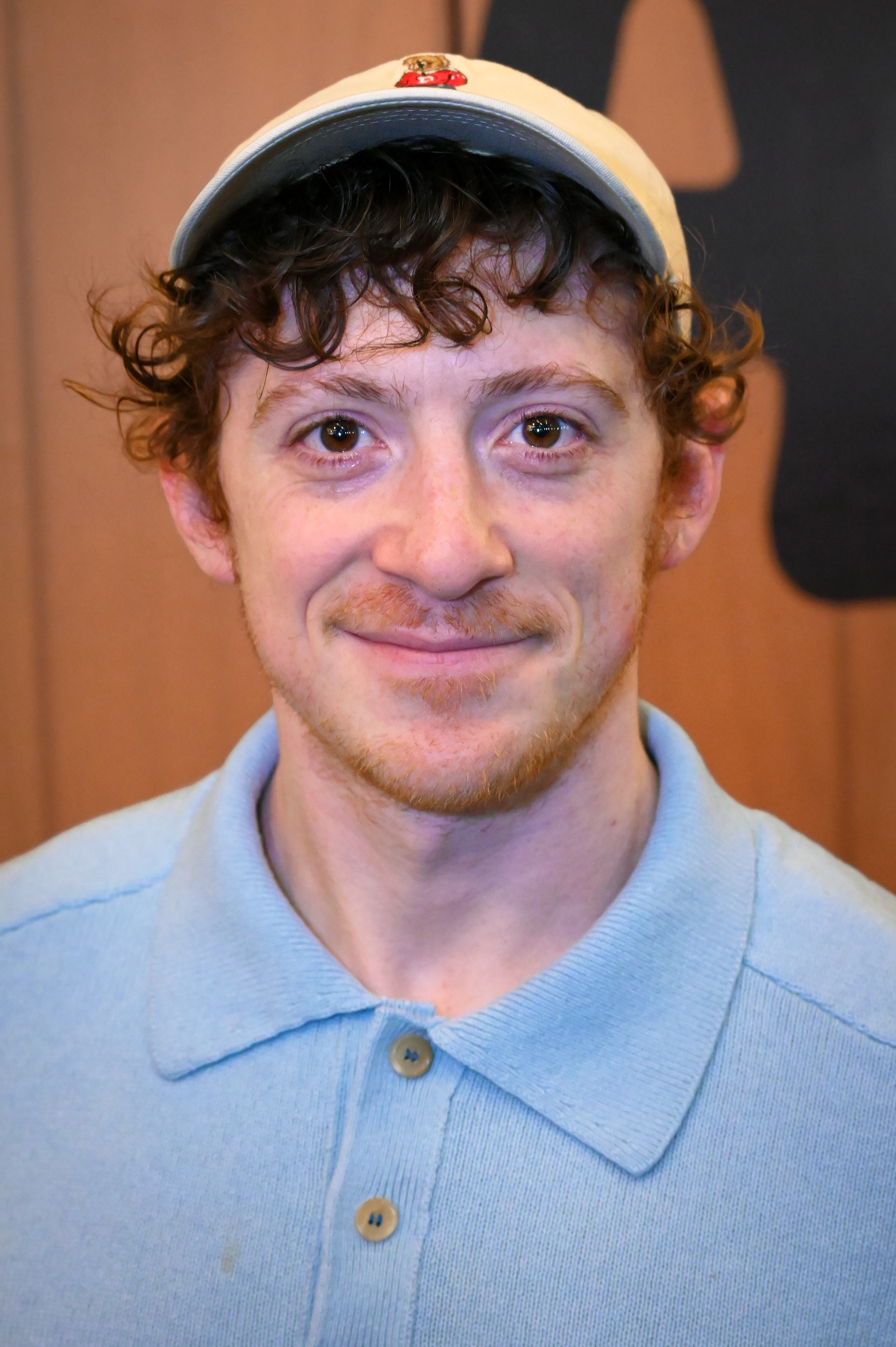
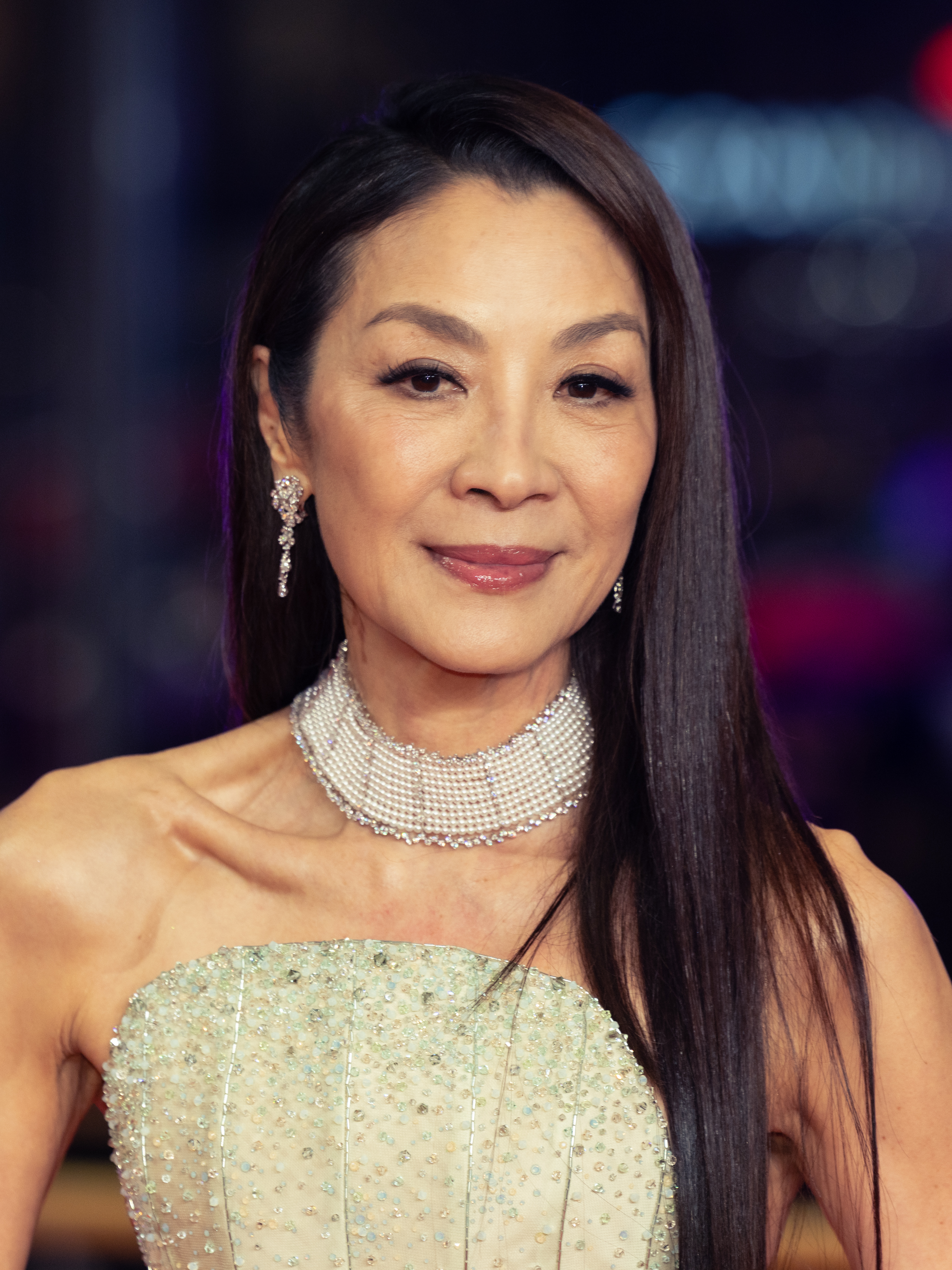
The Wicked films feature an extensive cast including (left to right): Jonathan Bailey, Marissa Bode, Sharon D. Clarke, Peter Dinklage, Cynthia Erivo (top), Jeff Goldblum, Ariana Grande, Adam James, Keala Settle, Ethan Slater, and Michelle Yeoh (bottom).

Scheduling conflicts, partly due to the COVID-19 pandemic and its impact on the film industry, resulted in a delay to December 22, 2021, before the film was removed from Universal's release schedule in April 2020; Daldry exited the project later in October. In February 2021, Jon M. Chu was announced as the film's new director. Production staff that joined in the following years included Schwartz, Holzman, Dana Fox (who also co-wrote the script with Holzman), David Nicksay, and Jared LeBoff as executive producers; Alice Brooks as cinematographer (in her and Chu's second collaboration, following the In the Heights film adaptation); Nathan Crowley as production designer; Paul Tazewell as costume designer; and John Powell as score composer.

In November, singer-actresses Cynthia Erivo and Ariana Grande were cast as Elphaba and Glinda. Jonathan Bailey joined as Fiyero in September 2022, and Jeff Goldblum joined as the Wizard in December; that same month, supporting roles were given to Ethan Slater, Michelle Yeoh, newcomer Marissa Bode, Bowen Yang, Bronwyn James, Keala Settle, Aaron Teoh, and Colin Michael Carmichael. Peter Dinklage joined as Dr. Dilamond in April 2024.

Principal photography began on December 9, 2022, at the newly-built Sky Studios Elstree in Borehamwood, England. Filming was set to wrap in July 2023 before the 2023 SAG-AFTRA strike forced a hiatus until November. Filming resumed and concluded between January 24 and 26, 2024. Production was done with heavy use of large-scale practical sets, including nine million tulips planted around the Munchkinland set, a yellow brick road paved with real mud, and a life-sized train to the Emerald City. Visual effects were handled by Industrial Light & Magic and Framestore, while editing was done by Myron Kerstein (in his and Chu's third collaboration) using Avid Media Composer. Post-production was completed by September 2024.

The film, titled on-screen as Wicked: Part I, held its world premiere at the State Theatre in Sydney on November 3, before releasing in the United States on November 22. It grossed $758.8 million worldwide against a $150 million budget, becoming the fifth-highest-grossing film of 2024 and dethroning Oz the Great and Powerful (2013) and Mamma Mia! (2008) as the highest-grossing Oz film and highest-grossing film based on a Broadway musical, respectively. Critical reception was positive, with praise for Chu's direction, the production values, and performances of the cast; the film has since appeared in lists of the best musical and fantasy films of the 21st century. (Note: Attributed to multiple references:) It won two Academy Awards for Best Costume Design and Best Production Design, and was named Best Film by the National Board of Review.

==== Wicked: For Good (2025) ====
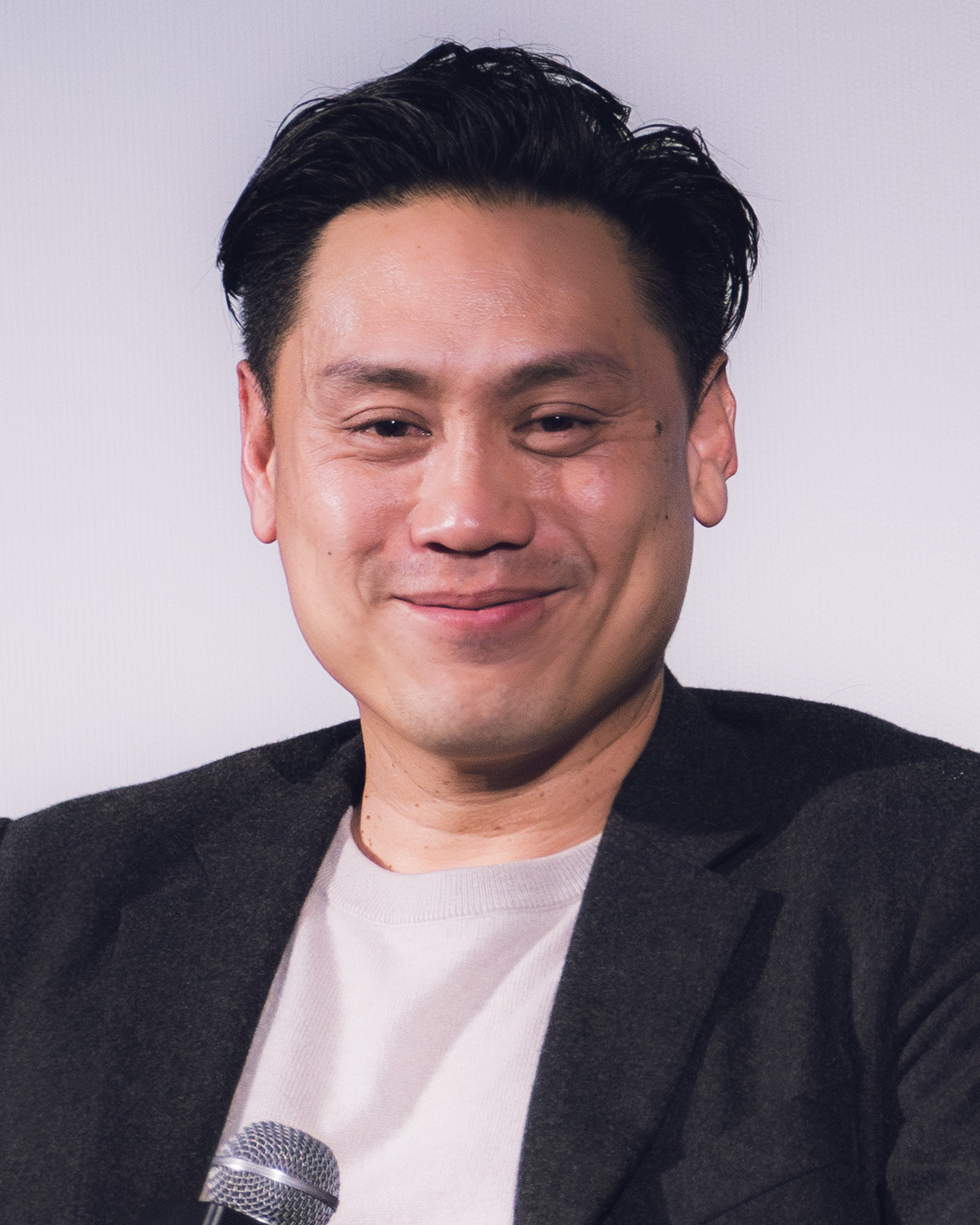
Jon M. Chu, director of the Wicked films

On April 26, 2022, Chu announced the decision to split the film adaptation in two parts, stating:

As we prepared the production over the last year, it became impossible to wrestle the story of 'Wicked' into a single film without doing some real damage to it ... As we tried to cut songs or trim characters, those decisions began to feel like fatal compromises to the source material that has entertained us all for so many years. We decided to give ourselves a bigger canvas and make not just one 'Wicked' movie but two! With more space, we can tell the story of 'Wicked' as it was meant to be told while bringing even more depth and surprise to the journeys for these beloved characters.

Schwartz echoed Chu's sentiment in June, while also confirming a new song was in the works for one of the two parts:

We found it very difficult to get past 'Defying Gravity' without a break ... That song is written specifically to bring a curtain down, and whatever scene to follow it without a break just seemed hugely anti-climactic ... Even as a very long single movie, it required us cutting or omitting things that we wanted to include and that we think fans of the show and the story will appreciate. What we have discussed is that changes need to be 'additive', to use (producer) Marc Platt's term. They need to add something to the story or the characters. They can't just be changes to do something different. I feel confident that by the time the movie is made, if we all continue to have the same degree of input, I could have a conversation with anyone who has a question about any of the changes made from the stage show and justify why I think it's better for the movie.

In November 2022, Schwartz revealed the second film would include two new songs "to meet the demands of the storytelling." Chu prioritized finishing post-production on the first film in order to understand how the second would continue the story. The process had resumed by November 2024, and the following month, the film — which had tentatively been labeled Wicked: Part Two — was officially titled Wicked: For Good, sharing its subtitle with the musical's penultimate number. Its first trailer was attached to a one-night, theatrical re-release of Wicked on June 4, 2025, before premiering online later. The film held its world premiere at the Suhai Music Hall in São Paulo on November 4, 2025, and was released in the United States on November 21, to mixed reviews.

==== Future ====
In November 2024, Schwartz and Holzman said they had discussed the possibility of "something" more associated with the Wicked film adaptation, but that it would not necessarily be a Wicked Part Three or Four.

==== Theme park attractions ====
In February 2025, The New York Times reported that Universal Destinations & Experiences was in early development on creating attractions based on the films for one of their theme parks, with some believing they would be added to the Universal Epic Universe park at Universal Orlando sometime after its opening in May of that year, or to the Universal United Kingdom park that is expected to open in 2031.

== The Grimmerie ==
The Grimmerie (a variation on the words grimoire and gramarye) is a fictional book of spells in The Wicked Years universe. In both the original novels and the stage musical, the Grimmerie is written in a language that the people of Oz cannot read; in the novels, this is because the book came from Earth and is written in English, whereas in the musical, it is said to be written in the "lost language of spells". The Grimmerie is also the title of a behind-the-scenes book about the musical, published in 2005 (ISBN 1-4013-0820-1).

In the novel, the Grimmerie contains information on various supernatural creatures, including angels and an entire section on "Evil Particulars" (i.e. demons), methods of poisoning water and breeding a docile population, as well as diagrams of instruments of torture and weapons which Elphaba considers "too vile to use". It also contains:

- A recipe entitled "Of apples with black skin and white flesh: to fill the stomach with greed unto Death"
- A recipe to overthrow a regime, which suggests spells for various methods of sabotage and assassination
- Spells for "unleashing the hidden energies of matter"
- Spells to tamper with time
- A spell "On the Administration of Dragons". This page plays an important part in the plot of Son of a Witch, where Shell Thropp, the Emperor Apostle, presents this page to Trism bon Cavalish.
- Spells to encourage flight in originally earth-bound animals
- Various "marginalia on how to keep awake", which Elphaba combines with home remedies to produce a powerful insomnia potion
- "A spell to reveal hidden inscription [...]Perhaps even the location of individuals in hiding". The reverse side of the page on the Administration of Dragons contains the second half of this spell.
- A spell entitled "To Call Winter on Water", used by Glinda to trap war ships advancing on Munchkinland in ice, in the beginning of Out of Oz

In the musical, the Grimmerie is a pivotal instrument in Elphaba's magical powers. It contains a variety of incantations, written in a strange language, that allow her to perform various spells throughout the musical; the contents are considerably less gruesome than those of its novel counterpart.

== See also ==
- Adaptations of The Wonderful Wizard of Oz
