= Wicked (Maguire novel) =

1995 novel by Gregory Maguire

- First edition cover
- Author: Gregory Maguire
- Illustrator: Douglas Smith
- Cover artist: Douglas Smith
- Language: English
- Series: The Wicked Years
- Genre: Fantasy, Fanfiction
- Publisher: ReganBooks
- Publication date: 1995
- Publication place: United States
- Media type: Print (hardback)
- Pages: 560
- ISBN: 0-06-039144-8
- OCLC: 32746783
- Dewey Decimal: 813/.54 20
- LC Class: PS3563.A3535 W5 1995
- Followed by: Son of a Witch

Wicked: The Life and Times of the Wicked Witch of the West is a 1995 dark fantasy novel by American writer Gregory Maguire, with illustrations by Douglas Smith. It is the first novel in The Wicked Years series, and was followed by Son of a Witch (September 2005), A Lion Among Men (October 2008), and Out of Oz (November 2011), plus a number of short stories since 2012.

Wicked is a cynical, adult-oriented revision of the characters and setting of L. Frank Baum's 1900 children's novel The Wonderful Wizard of Oz, along with its sequels and 1939 film adaptation. The novel is presented as a biography of the Wicked Witch of the West, here given the name Elphaba Thropp. The book follows Elphaba from her birth through her social ostracism, school years, radicalization, and final days. Maguire depicts the traditionally villainous character in a sympathetic light, using her journey to explore the problem of evil and nature versus nurture debate, as well as themes of terrorism, propaganda, and existential purpose.

In 2003, the novel was loosely adapted as the Tony Award–winning Broadway musical Wicked, in turn adapted into a two-part feature film, with the first film released in November 2024 and the second film released in November 2025. Despite heavy changes from his novel, Maguire gave high praise to the adaptations, dedicating Son of a Witch to the musical and speaking highly of the films.

== Background ==
Maguire began contemplating the nature of evil while living in London in the early 1990s. He noticed that while the problem of evil had been explored from various different perspectives, those perspectives were seldom synthesized together. He wondered whether calling a person evil might be enough to cause a self-fulfilling prophecy.

If everyone was always calling you a bad name, how much of that would you internalize? How much of that would you say, all right, go ahead, I'll be everything that you call me because I have no capacity to change your minds anyway so why bother. By whose standards should I live?

He was also inspired by the 1993 murder of James Bulger, in which both victim and perpetrators were young children.

Everyone was asking: how could those boys be so villainous? Were they born evil or were there circumstances that pushed them towards behaving like that? It propelled me back to the question of evil that bedevils anybody raised Catholic.

Up to that point strictly a children's author, Maguire had difficulty finding an effective way to write about evil, since in his mind, there were no truly evil characters in children's literature. In what he later described as "the one great revelation of my life," Maguire realized that there were in fact villains in children's books; however, they were usually written as one-dimensional stock characters in order to provoke a quick emotional reaction from young readers. Wondering whom to write about, he envisioned the Wicked Witch of the West, as played by Margaret Hamilton in the MGM film, delivering her iconic line, "I'll get you, my pretty, and your little dog too!" Maguire had a lifelong fascination with The Wizard of Oz, both Baum's original novel and the film, which he watched every year during its annual broadcast. He decided to tell the Wicked Witch's life story using the same large scale and broad moral messages found in the novels of Charles Dickens.

== Plot ==
In the Land of Oz, a minister's wife, Melena Thropp, gives birth to a daughter, Elphaba. Elphaba has green skin, sharp teeth, a savage demeanor, and a fear of water. The story details Elphaba's difficult childhood before flashing forward to show her at Shiz University with her social climbing roommate Galinda, who is destined to become Glinda.

While at Shiz, the two girls discover that Oz is rife with political tension. Elphaba bonds with animal professor Doctor Dillamond, however he is tragically killed in his lab by Madam Morribles TikTok assistant Gromateik, however this is covered up as an accident. Headmistress and Ozian power broker Madame Morrible suggests that Elphaba and Glinda work for her from behind the scenes to help stabilize the political situation in Oz. Preferring more direct action, Elphaba and Glinda travel to the Emerald City, where they meet the Wizard and plead their case. When the Wizard dismisses their concerns, Elphaba takes matters into her own hands. She goes into hiding and joins an underground terrorist group working out of the Emerald City.

Five years later, Elphaba reconnects with former schoolmate Prince Fiyero, now married with three children, and the two begin an illicit affair. While Elphaba makes an attempt at assassinating Madame Morrible, Fiyero is caught in Elphaba's hideout and brutally murdered by the Wizard's secret police force, leaving only a blood-soaked scene in Elphaba’s apartment. Traumatised by the death of her secret lover, Elphaba takes refuge in a convent. Seven years later, she visits Fiyero's family at their castle, Kiamo Ko, in hopes of gaining their forgiveness. She brings along a boy named Liir, her son by Fiyero. Fiyero's family allow her to stay as their guest, but his wife Sarima refuses to hear her apology. While there, Elphaba finds the Grimmerie, a book of spells and magic, and begins to study sorcery, gaining a reputation as a witch.

Elphaba's father asks for her help with her sister Nessarose, who has also become a witch and has taken Elphaba's hereditary position as ruler of Munchkinland. Tired of being used as a pawn in other people's agendas and having no interest in ruling, Elphaba instead renounces her claim. Nessarose promises to give Elphaba her enchanted silver shoes after she dies. When Elphaba returns to Kiamo Ko, she discovers the Wizard's troops have taken Fiyero's family prisoner.

Seven years later, a storm visits Munchkinland, dropping a farmhouse on Nessarose and killing her. The farmhouse's passengers are a little girl named Dorothy Gale and her little dog, Toto. Elphaba and Glinda reunite for the first time in years shortly after Nessarose's death. Upon learning that Glinda sent Dorothy off with Nessarose's shoes, for fear of their power igniting a civil war in Munchkinland, Elphaba is furious, as the shoes were rightfully hers. She fears the shoes will fall into the hands of the Wizard, who may use them to further advance his power and political agenda.

Elphaba meets with the Wizard to beg for the release of Fiyero's family in exchange for the Grimmerie. The Wizard explains that he has killed them all except for Fiyero's daughter Nor, whom he keeps as a slave. He explains that he comes from a different world, the same world the book comes from, and is not bound by the laws of Oz. Elphaba then seeks out the elderly Madame Morrible to complete the assassination she failed at years earlier, only to discover that she had died, mere minutes before Elphaba arrived. After bludgeoning the old woman's corpse, Elphaba learns from the Clock of the Time Dragon that the Wizard is her biological father, making her the child of two different worlds and thus destined never to truly belong to Oz. She returns to Kiamo Ko, where Liir informs her he has learned from soldiers stationed nearby that the Wizard has sent Dorothy and her companions on a mission to kill Elphaba. Guilt-ridden by the murder of Fiyero, Elphaba begins to wonder if he is the scarecrow in disguise, however she is proven wrong and discovers there is no secret lover hiding behind the straw.

When Dorothy and her friends arrive at Kiamo Ko, she tells Elphaba that while the Wizard sent her with orders to "kill the Wicked Witch of the West," Dorothy came to apologize for inadvertently killing Nessarose. Furious that Dorothy is asking for the forgiveness she herself has been denied, Elphaba waves her burning broom in the air and inadvertently sets her skirt on fire. Dorothy throws a bucket of water on her to save her, unaware that Elphaba is allergic to water. The water melts her away.

Dorothy returns to the Wizard with a green bottle, which he recognizes as the potion he used to drug Melena years earlier. He hastily departs the Emerald City for his own world mere hours before a coup would have overthrown and killed him. The book ends with political chaos reigning over Oz.

== Major characters ==
- Elphaba Thropp: The protagonist of the book, Elphaba is a green-skinned girl who later becomes known as the Wicked Witch of the West. Later in the book, it is revealed that she is the daughter of the Wizard. The Wicked Witch of the West is not given a name in Baum's novels; Maguire derived the name Elphaba from Baum's initials, LFB.
- Galinda Arduenna Upland (later Glinda): Elphaba's roommate at Shiz University, who eventually becomes the Good Witch of the North. She hates Elphaba at first, but they later become close friends, or in some interpretations, lovers.
- Nessarose Thropp: Elphaba's younger sister, who eventually becomes known as the Wicked Witch of the East. Nessarose was born without arms. She is extremely beautiful and is better liked than Elphaba, causing Elphaba to resent her.
- Fiyero Tigelaar: The prince (later chieftain) of the Arjiki tribe in the Vinkus. He meets Elphaba at Shiz and later has an affair with her while she is involved in the resistance movement against the Wizard of Oz.
- The Wonderful Wizard of Oz: The book's main antagonist. The Wizard is a human who came to Oz from Earth in a hot air balloon. He was originally seeking the Grimmerie, but discovered he could orchestrate a coup d'état and take power for himself.
- Madame Morrible: The headmistress of Shiz University's Crage Hall, which Elphaba and Galinda attend, and a behind-the-scenes power broker in Ozian politics.
- Boq: A kind-hearted Munchkin who befriends Elphaba and Galinda at Shiz.
- Dr. Dillamond: Elphaba's mentor and favorite professor at Shiz. He is a Goat who is later assassinated as part of the Wizard's campaign against Animals.
- Melena Thropp: The mother of Elphaba, Nessarose, and their brother Shell.
- Frexspar the Godly: Melena's husband, a traveling minister.
- Shell Thropp: Elphaba and Nessarose's younger brother.

== Themes ==
=== Nature of evil ===
According to author Maguire, Wicked is primarily about identifying with someone who is ostracized. The Gazette called Wicked "a cautionary tale...about what happens when we as a society decide to label anyone who differs from the norm as evil."

Prior to writing Wicked, Maguire became interested in examining the nature of evil from the perspective of someone considered evil. He noted that while Baum had deliberately avoided using traditional fairy tale characters in writing the original novel, the Wicked Witch of the West was the sole exception, being depicted as the stereotypical "witch in her castle" figure, with wickedness her single defining character trait. The novel raises the question of whether evil is inborn or acquired. Elphaba is a social outcast despite being of noble birth, which makes her question how much power she truly has over her own life.

=== Propaganda and terrorism ===
Writing for The American Experience, Rebecca Onion called Wicked "an extended meditation on power and politics." Maguire has noted the similarities between the words "wicked" and "Hitler," calling it "no accident" that he chose this title for his book. He recalled reading a newspaper headline in 1991 comparing Saddam Hussein to Adolf Hitler and feeling firsthand the emotional power of propaganda. Maguire "set out to examine the language and propaganda used to marshal brute force against individuals or minorities that might have been opposed to the war." In the book, one major plank of the Wizard's agenda involves the subjugation of sapient Animals and Madame Morrible promotes this idea using a type of moralistic poem called a "quell." Elphaba instantly sees the propaganda for what it is.

Tor noted that terrorism, committed both by and against the state, plays a major role in the second half of the book. The Wizard keeps an SS-like secret police, the Gale Force, which uses violence to carry out his totalitarian agenda. Elphaba similarly uses terrorism to combat them, though she shies away from targeting children.

=== Life purpose ===
A lifelong Catholic, Maguire remembered the nuns who taught in the Catholic schools of his boyhood home of Albany, New York. He admired their sense of purpose and dedication to their cause, saying that their integrity and inscrutability made them witches in his mind. Elphaba discovers her own purpose as a student at Shiz University, where the murder of her favorite professor, Dr. Dillamond, inspires her to join the cause of Animal rights. As the story progresses, she deepens her commitment to her cause, becoming a political exile for her beliefs.

== As revisionist literature ==
Wicked is on its face a revisionist parallel novel for The Wonderful Wizard of Oz. The Independent compared it to Wide Sargasso Sea and Wild Wood as part of "a fascinating sub-genre of novels that revisit well-known stories as much in the spirit of criticism as homage." While previous authors had accepted the existing moral framework of the Oz stories, Wicked showed affection for the originals while simultaneously questioning everything they stood for. Maguire presents a sympathetic view of a villainous character by detailing her life story and helping the reader understand how "an innocent if rather green and biting child" can become "a still moralistic terrorist." He also transformed the Land of Oz itself, changing what he saw as an insular, parochial world into one where different groups and their political agendas intersect and overlap.

== Reception ==
Wicked received mostly positive reviews. Publishers Weekly called it a "fantastical meditation on good and evil, God and free will" which combined "puckish humor and bracing pessimism." Kirkus Reviews called it "A captivating, funny, and perceptive look at destiny, personal responsibility, and the not-always-clashing beliefs of faith and magic." Library Journal recommended the book to "good readers who like satire, and love exceedingly imaginative and clever fantasy." The Los Angeles Times favorably compared Wicked with other "fantasy novels of ideas" such as Gormenghast and Dune.

The New York Times was a notable outlier, criticizing the novel's strident politics and moral relativism. Reviewer Michiko Kakutani argued that Maguire "shows little respect for Baum's original story." Wicked, she felt, "turns a wonderfully spontaneous world of fantasy into a lugubrious allegorical realm, in which everything and everyone is labeled with a topical name tag."

In 2005, ten years after its publication, Wicked spent 26 weeks on the New York Times bestseller list. The novel has sold five million copies since its 1995 publication.

== Adaptations ==
=== Musical ===
In 2003, the novel was adapted as the Broadway musical Wicked by composer/lyricist Stephen Schwartz and librettist Winnie Holzman. Having originally sold the rights to Universal Pictures, Maguire was convinced to release the rights to a stage production because the opening number, "No One Mourns the Wicked" made it clear to him that Schwartz understood the story. The musical was produced by Universal Pictures and directed by Joe Mantello, with musical staging by Wayne Cilento. The Broadway production was followed by long-running productions in Chicago, San Francisco, and Los Angeles in the United States, as well as London, Germany, and Japan. It was nominated for ten Tony Awards, winning three, and is the 4th longest-running Broadway show in history, with over 8,500 performances. The original Broadway production starred Idina Menzel as Elphaba and Kristin Chenoweth as Glinda.

=== Unproduced television program ===
In a 2009 interview, Maguire stated that he had sold the rights to ABC to make an independent non-musical TV adaptation of Wicked. It would not be based on Winnie Holzman's script for the musical play. On January 9, 2011, Entertainment Weekly reported that ABC would be teaming up with Salma Hayek and her production company to create a TV miniseries of Wicked based solely on Maguire's novel. The miniseries never entered production.

=== Films ===
In September 2010, Filmshaft disclosed that Universal Pictures was beginning work on a film adaptation of the stage musical. In December 2012, following the success of Les Misérables, Marc Platt, also a producer of the stage version, announced the film was going ahead, later confirming the film was aiming for a 2016 release. Universal announced in 2016 that the film would be released in theaters on December 22, 2021, with Stephen Daldry directing. After production was shut down during the 2020 Coronavirus pandemic, Daldry left the production due to scheduling conflicts and was replaced by Jon M. Chu. Cynthia Erivo and Ariana Grande were cast as Elphaba and Galinda, respectively, with Jonathan Bailey as Fiyero.

The first film of the two-part adaptation was released on November 22, 2024, and the second film was released on November 21, 2025.

=== Graphic novel ===
From 2025 to 2026, Scott Hampton adapted Wicked into a two-volume authorized graphic novel.
