= Son of a Witch =

2005 novel by Gregory Maguire

- Cover
- Author: Gregory Maguire
- Illustrator: Douglas Smith
- Language: English
- Series: The Wicked Years
- Genre: Parallel novel, fantasy
- Publisher: Regan Books
- Publication date: 2005
- Publication place: United States
- Media type: Print (hardback)
- Pages: 352
- ISBN: 0-06-074722-6
- OCLC: 60359529
- Preceded by: Wicked
- Followed by: A Lion Among Men

Son of a Witch is a 2005 dark fantasy novel by American writer Gregory Maguire. The book is Maguire's fifth revisionist novel and the second installment in The Wicked Years series, serving as a sequel to Wicked (1995). It follows Liir, the son of Elphaba Thropp, over a decade-long period following his mother's death and the Wizard of Oz's fall from power.

Son of a Witch is dedicated to the cast of the Broadway musical Wicked, an adaptation of the original novel.

== Background ==
Like Wicked, Son of a Witch depicts a darker and more mature side of the world of Oz. In an interview that was included with the Son of a Witch audio CD, Gregory Maguire gave two reasons for writing the book: "the many letters from young fans asking what happened to Nor, last seen as a chained political prisoner, and seeing the Abu Ghraib torture photographs."

== Plot ==
Oatsie Manglehand discovers a young man, badly bruised and near death, by the side of a road in the Vinkus and brings him to the Cloister of Saint Glinda. The Superior Maunt recognizes the young man as Liir, the young boy who left the Cloister with Elphaba a decade or so ago. The Maunt appoints Candle, a young Quadling girl, to watch over Liir. While he recovers, Liir subconsciously tells us the following story, taking place over the previous decade:

After Elphaba's death, Liir accompanied Dorothy Gale and her friends back to the Emerald City. On their way they met Princess Nastoya, where she asked Liir to use magic to transfer her back to her natural Elephant state, a wish Liir cannot grant but Nastoya ordered him to anyway. This becomes an important motif throughout the book. The others went off to receive what they were promised by the Wizard, leaving Liir alone. Liir spent some time unsuccessfully searching for Nor, Fiyero's daughter who went missing during the events of Wicked.

Soon after, with the help of Glinda, Commander Cherrystone (the general who had kidnapped Sarima and her family in the previous book) as well as Shell (Elphaba's younger brother, and therefore Liir's uncle) he manages to get into Southstairs, a prison which has developed into an underground city, in order to find Nor. Liir ends up breaking away from Shell and manages to find a way out of Southstairs. Soon after he decides to enlist in the Home Guard; a young member of the Home Guard named Trism bon Cavalish helps him revise his story to help him get in.

During his service, he was deployed on a peacekeeping mission to Quadling Country. After being forced to participate in the destruction of a Quadling village, Liir deserted the Home Guard and returned to the castle of Kiamo Ko. We find out later on that the Quadlings attacked and killed most of the soldiers and dragons were then sent to punish them.

One day, the Princess of the Swans landed at Kiamo Ko, having been attacked by a predator. Before she died, she asked Chistery the flying monkey to take her place at the Conference of the Birds. Chistery declined and Liir decided to go in her stead. While flying on Elphaba's broom to reach the Conference, Liir was attacked by dragons, who took the broom. Liir fell to earth, where Oatsie Manglehand found him.

After Candle hears Liir's story, the two run away together and settle in a deserted farmhouse, which Candle names "Apple Press Farm." Liir goes to the Conference of the Birds, where he learns that the Birds are under attack. The new Emperor of Oz is afraid of the Birds' power to spread news throughout the land and has sent the dragons to attack them. Liir agrees to help the Conference destroy the dragons and recover the broom.

Returning to Apple Press Farm, Candle tells Liir she is pregnant, explaining that she had raped him while he was unconscious. Liir then decides to run off back to the Emerald City, wherein he meets Trism once again. They converse at a bar where Liir finds out that the Emperor is his own uncle, Shell. With the help of Liir, Trism kills the dragons and are forced to flee together.

During their flight, Liir and Trism briefly become lovers during their stay at an Inn. They end up at the Cloister of Saint Glinda, where the Home Guard besiege them. The mauntery is spared from attack because Glinda is staying there on retreat. With her help, they come up with a plan for the pair's escape: Liir will fly away on his broom, while Trism will leave with Glinda, disguised as her servant. Liir flies about Oz, collecting and training a huge flock of Birds, which he leads to the Emerald City. Over the City, they fly in formation as a huge representation of the Witch.

When returning home, he is greeted by the Scrow, as well as Candle. Whilst he is there, he and Candle grant Princess Nastoya's wish by returning her to her Elephant form before she dies, and Liir leaves again to carry Princess Nastoya's bones back to the Vinkus. Before returning, it dawns on Liir that the "ELPHABA LIVES!" graffiti he has seen in the Emerald City earlier in the book is in Nor's handwriting. When he arrives at Apple Press Farm, Candle is gone, but he finds wrapped in Elphaba's cloak a newborn baby whom he initially thinks is dead but revives under his care. Holding the baby up to the rain to wash away the birth blood, she "cleans up green."

== Notable Characters ==
- Liir: The protagonist of the story and the son of Elphaba Thropp and Fiyero Tigelaar. Liir is described as handsome, tall with black hair and pale skin. He is fourteen at the start of the novel, which spans a period of over ten years. The story also reveals that Liir is bisexual, having romantic relationships with both Trism and Candle.
- Candle: A Quadling girl who rarely speaks, and only in her native tongue, Qua'ati, though she understands other speech. She is a skilled player on the domingon, a Quadling musical instrument, and has a "talent for reading the present". Candle is one of two main love interests of Liir from the third part onwards.
- Princess Nastoya: The leader of the Scrow, who was seen briefly during the previous book. She is an Elephant who disguised herself in human form, and asks Liir to help her return to her true form before she dies. This becomes a recurring side-plot throughout the book.
- Trism bon Cavalish: An old military friend of Liir's and later, his lover. Trism has great skill at training dragons, although he is distressed at the tasks for which he trains them.
- Commander Cherrystone: Liir's commanding officer in the Home Guard. Cherrystone was also briefly seen in its predecessor as one of the men who kidnapped Sarima and her family. He becomes Liir's mentor, which leads to Liir's being put in charge of the operation to burn the Quadling village of Bengda.
- Oatsie Manglehand: A woman who runs a horse-and-coach caravan that transports passengers along the Grassland Trail through the Vinkus. She finds the injured Liir and brings him to the Cloister of Saint Glinda.
- The Superior Maunt of the Cloister of Saint Glinda: The Superior Maunt during Elphaba's seven-year stay at the Cloister. During the siege of the Cloister, she abdicates as sole authority of the mauntery and establishes a triumvirate consisting of herself, Sister Doctor, and the absent Candle.
- Yackle: An old maunt who admits Candle into the Cloister and warns Liir of impending danger.
- Chistery: The snow monkey Elphaba taught to speak and gave wings (making him a Winged monkey). He remains at Kiamo Ko, looking after Nanny.
- Shell Thropp, The Emperor Apostle: Elphaba's half-brother, and Liir's half-uncle in turn, Shell is a fop and gigolo (and perhaps a sex addict). He becomes Emperor of Oz after the assassination of the Scarecrow.
- Lady Glinda Chuffrey, née Arduenna of the Uplands: Glinda is appointed interim ruler of Oz after the overthrow of the Wizard, but abdicates in favor of the Scarecrow. When her husband Lord Chuffrey dies, Glinda goes on retreat at the Cloister of Saint Glinda.
- The Scarecrow: This character has a more substantial role in Son of a Witch than the Tin Man or the Cowardly Lion. He searches out Liir after having seen the Wizard to warn him that the slum he is living in is about to be 'cleaned up' by the authorities, and brings Elphaba's broom to Liir.
- Rain: Liir and Candle's daughter who is briefly seen at the very end of the book.

== Release details ==
Son of a Witch was released on October 1, 2005, in hardcover format by Regan Books. The paperback edition was released in the United States on January 1, 2006.

== Literary significance and criticism ==
Overall, reviews for Son of a Witch were mixed. Some reviewers praised the book for its innovative look into an imperfect fantasy world while others disparaged the book's perceived lack of focus. Writing for The Boston Globe, Sarah Smith wrote, "Maguire has done it again: Son of a Witch is as wicked as they come," but Katharine Powers for The Washington Post called it "off-kilter and aimless." Kirkus Reviews keeps the middle ground of these two characterizations, writing, "The book works too hard to dazzle us; it's considerably more cluttered and strained than Wicked. … Too long, but few readers will fail to stay its magical course. Once again, the myth of Oz proves its enduring power."

In 2011, Gay-Nerds.com named Liir #1 on its list of Top Ten LGBT Book Characters.
