= Lost (Maguire novel) =

2001 novel by Gregory Maguire

- First edition
- Author: Gregory Maguire
- Cover artist: Douglas Smith
- Language: English
- Genre: Mystery
- Publisher: William Morrow
- Publication date: October 2, 2001
- Publication place: United States
- Media type: Print (Hardback & Paperback)
- Pages: 339 (Hardback)
- ISBN: 0-06-039382-3 (Hardback), ISBN 0-06-098864-9 (Paperback)
- OCLC: 46976536
- Dewey Decimal: 813/.54 21
- LC Class: PS3563.A3535 L6 2001

Lost is a 2001 novel by American author Gregory Maguire. Unlike many of Maguire's other adult novels, Lost is set in the real world. The novel's concept is that the protagonist is a distant relative of the man who inspired Charles Dickens' character of Ebenezer Scrooge.

== Plot summary ==
Winifred Rudge is an American writer who travels to London to visit a distant cousin, and to research a new novel about a woman haunted by the ghost of Jack the Ripper. When she arrives, she discovers that her cousin has vanished, his apartment (once owned by a common ancestor of theirs: a man who was supposedly the inspiration for Ebenezer Scrooge) is being renovated, and strange sounds are coming from the chimney. It seems the apartment is now haunted by a supernatural presence.

Although the plot of the novel revolves around Winifred trying to chase down the ghost in her cousin's apartment, along the way a deep mystery that exists between Winifried and her cousin, John Comestor, is revealed. While trying to solve the mystery Winifried is forced to face the ghosts of her own past and examine her choices and motivations.

== Critical reception ==
Ara Taylor, writing for the Bellingham Herald, found the novel's plot too convoluted but the concept intriguing. "Author of the delightful Wicked and the even more resplendent Confessions of an Ugly Stepsister, Gregory Maguire has climbed out on a thematically tricky limb here. It doesn't work as well as he might have hoped it would, but to be just, only an ingenious writer would even tackle such psychic fare." Cara Doup Muller, writing for the Orlando Sentinel, agreed that the plot meandered too much. "There is a genuinely affecting explanation for the haunting and for Winnie's odd detachment from her life. The hints are there from the beginning -- two wonderful scenes in the Boston area about a carpool lane accident and a meeting of a support group for adopting parents. But wending our way back to them through the rest of the novel is a more arduous task than it should be." She also criticized the Jack the Ripper subplot and the quotations from Rudge's novel (quoted at length throughout the book) as distracting and disruptive to the narrative's pacing.

Molly Bettiga of the Charlotte Observer was more positive. Bettiga was impressed that Maguire created a character of his own rather than using one from literature. She found the novel's literary allusions, however, to be its strong point: "Maguire's book is cleverly written and filled with mentions of childhood poems, stories and passages that remind you of watching a movie with many movie-star cameos. These appearances add depth to the story and character, rather than star-power."

Rob Thomas, writing for the Capital Times, was highly laudatory. Also pleased with Maguire's creation of an entirely original character, Thomas found Maguire's novel to be "his most mature, subtle and entertaining. It weaves a spooky ghost story with a very human tale of regret and grief. ... You may physically put this book down, but it haunts your imagination until the last page is turned." An unidentified reviewer in The Boston Globe had equally high praise for the book, saying that it "brilliantly illuminates how life exacts a cost in ghosts."
