= Emerald City =

Fictional place in the Oz books by L. Frank Baum

- The Oz series location
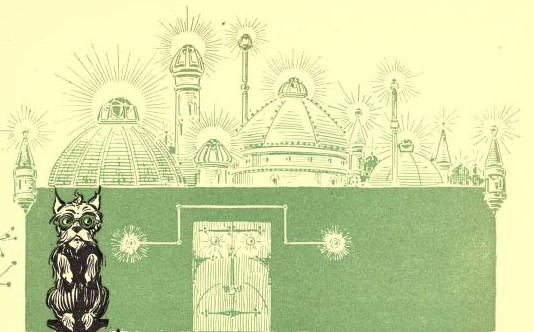
- Illustration by W. W. Denslow
- First appearance: The Wonderful Wizard of Oz
- Created by: L. Frank Baum
- Genre: Children's fantasy

In-universe information
- Type: Capital city
- Ruled by: Princess Ozma
- Locations: Ozma's palace
- Characters: Wizard of Oz, Dorothy Gale (eventually), Soldier with the Green Whiskers, Jellia Jamb
- Population: 57,318 (1910 census)

The Emerald City (sometimes called the City of Emeralds) is the capital city of the fictional Land of Oz in L. Frank Baum's Oz books, first described in The Wonderful Wizard of Oz (1900).

== Fictional description ==
Located in the center of the Land of Oz, the Emerald City is the end of the famous yellow brick road, which begins in Munchkin Country. In the center of the Emerald City is the Royal Palace of Oz. The Oz books generally describe the city as being built of green glass, emeralds, and other jewels.

In the earlier books, it was described as completely green. However, in later works, green was merely the predominant color while buildings were also decorated with gold, and people added other colors to their costumes.

=== In The Wonderful Wizard of Oz (1900) ===
In the first book, The Wonderful Wizard of Oz (1900), the city walls are green, but the city itself is not. However, when they enter, everyone in the Emerald City is made to wear green-tinted spectacles. This is explained as an effort to protect their eyes from the "brightness and glory" of the city. But its effect is to make everything appear green when the city is, in fact, "no more green than any other city", as the wizard admits. This is yet another "humbug" created by the Wizard.

One scene of the Emerald City is of particular note in the development of Oz: Dorothy sees rows of shops that sell green articles of every variety and a vendor who sells green lemonade that children buy with green pennies. This contrasts with the later description of Oz, in which money does not feature. Interpreters have argued that the Wizard may have introduced money into the city, but this is not in the text itself.

In this book, the Wizard also describes the city as having been built for the Wizard within a few years after he arrived. It was he who decreed that everyone in the Emerald City must wear green eyeglasses, since the first thing he noticed about Oz after he landed in his hot air balloon was how green and pleasant the land was. The city had many different types of areas. Including The Emerald City hotel, the Emerald city emporium, the emerald city train station, the Emerald city palace, the Emerald city hall, the emerald city park, the Emerald city suburbs, even a diner!

=== In The Marvelous Land of Oz (1904) ===
In The Marvelous Land of Oz (1904), the characters are required to wear the glasses at first, but, contrast to the preceding Wonderful Wizard of Oz (1900), halfway through the book, no more eyeglasses appear and no more mention is made of the brilliance, but the city is still described as green. This is continued throughout the series.

Although at one point the character Tip describes the city as being built by the Wizard, the Scarecrow later explains that the Wizard had usurped the crown of Pastoria, the former king of the city, and from the Wizard the crown had passed to him. The book quickly concerns itself with finding the rightful heir to the crown of the city. Princess Ozma remained the king's heir, though both she and the original king were transformed to the ruler of all Oz.

=== Later works ===
The story reverted to the Wizard's having built the city in Dorothy and the Wizard in Oz (1908), with the four witches having usurped the king's power before the Wizard's arrival.

The only allusions to the original conception of Emerald City among the Oz sequels appeared in The Road to Oz (1909), where the Little Guardian of the Gates wears green spectacles—though he is the only character to do so.

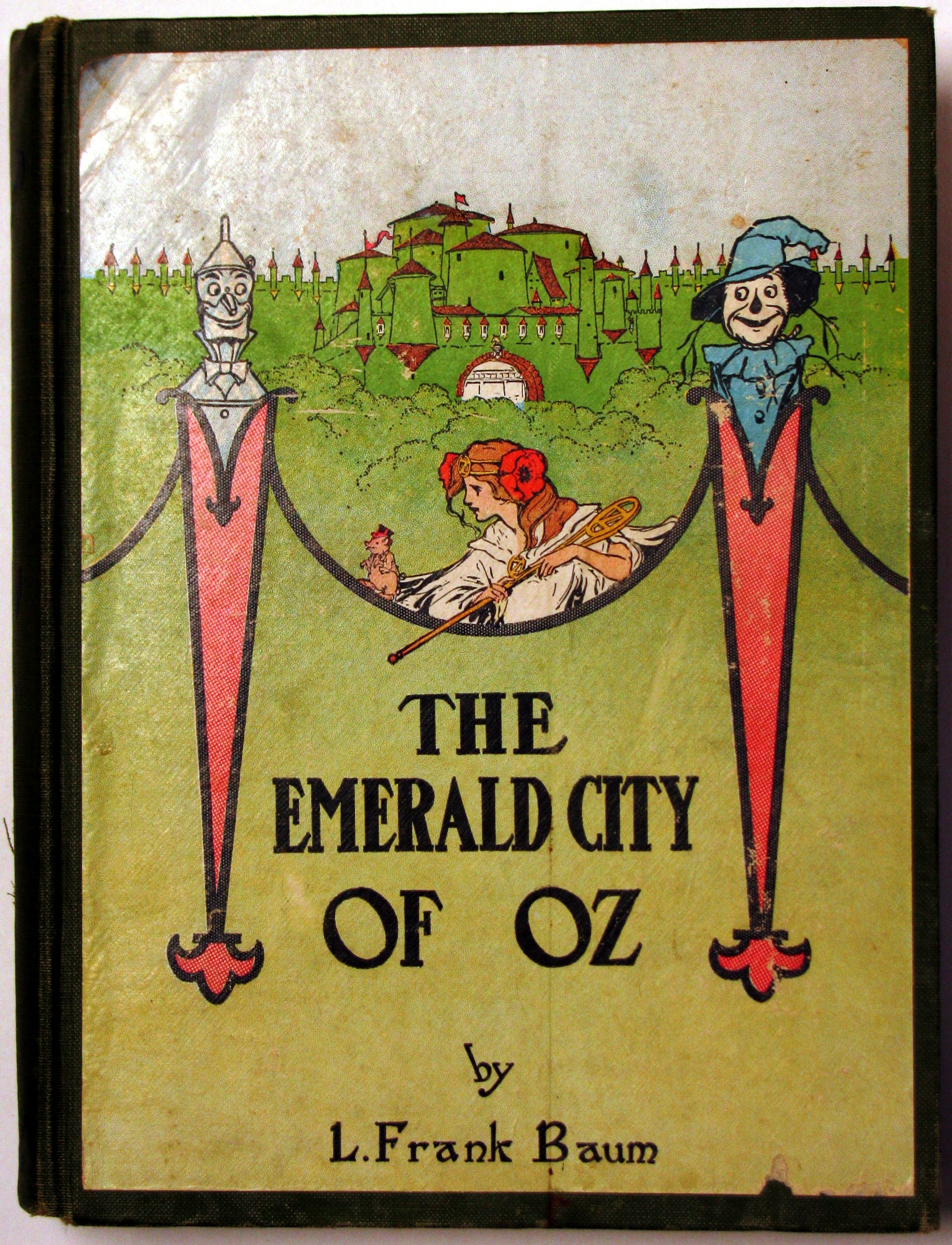
The Emerald City of Oz (1910)

The Emerald City of Oz (1910), the sixth book in the Oz series, describes the city as having exactly 9,654 buildings and 57,318 citizens.

== Inspiration ==
Baum may have been partly inspired in his creation of the Emerald City by the World Columbian Exposition of 1893, nicknamed the "White City," which he visited frequently, having moved to Chicago in anticipation of the event. W. W. Denslow, who illustrated the original Oz book, also incorporated elements that may have been inspired by the White City. Denslow was familiar with the exposition as he had been hired to sketch and document it for the Chicago Times. Likewise, the quick building of the real-life White City, in less than a year, may have contributed to the quick construction of the Emerald City in the first book.

Others believe Baum may have based his description of the city on the Hotel del Coronado, where he supposedly did much of his writing.

== Interpretations ==
=== Capitalist America ===
Scholars who interpret The Wonderful Wizard of Oz as a political allegory see the Emerald City as a metaphor for Washington, D.C., and unsecured "greenback" paper money. In this reading of the book, the city's illusory splendor and value are compared with the value of fiat money, which also has value only because of a shared illusion or convention. Here, Dorothy gains entry to the Emerald City (Washington, D.C.) wearing the witch's silver slippers (the silver standard) and taking the Yellow Brick Road (the gold standard). There, she met the Wizard (President William McKinley), whose power was eventually revealed to be an illusion.

=== Post-Industrial America ===
There are also scholars who interpret the Emerald City as a benevolent vision of America with its new priorities and values that emerged with the onset of the industrial order. Some claim, for instance, that it is 1890s Chicago, which rose on a plain, subsuming unto itself much of the Midwestern creative aspiration so that it becomes the Garden of the West that has long struggled in its prairies. This interpretation focused on the affirmative descriptions of the city, which reveal the benefits and rewards of the new culture, particularly urban abundance and the economy of consumption.

=== Other ===
More recently it has been speculated that the name “Emerald City” may be referring to the city of Seattle, Washington. This is incorrect as the American city gained its “Emerald City” nickname in 1982, over 80 years after the publication of Baum's first book.

== Known locations ==
- Notta Bit More's Tent – A tent outside the Royal Palace of Oz where Notta Bit More resides.
- Prison – This is the only prison in the Land of Oz, and it is run by Tollydiggle. The prison is rarely occupied due to lack of crime. Accordingly, Ojo is the only notable prisoner here.
- Royal Palace of Oz – The Royal Palace of Oz is at the center of the Emerald City. This is where the rulers of the Land of Oz reside. It contains a throne room, the royal gardens, and the royal suites for the guests to the Royal Palace.

== Adaptations and allusions ==
=== In city branding ===
==== United States of America ====
The City of Seattle has used "The Emerald City" as its official nickname since 1982. There is also a drink known as "Emerald City" that is associated with the city of Seattle.

Eugene, Oregon is also referred to as the Emerald City, and the region has been known as the "Emerald Empire" as early as 1928.

Greenville, North Carolina is called the Emerald City by locals and tourists alike. The city has an art loop in the uptown district that is called the emerald loop, and on New Years Eve, the city drops an Emerald in the Town Common Park.

Peter Kaplan, a media icon and the former editor of the New York Observer, a newspaper that chronicled the city's political, financial and cultural elites, frequently referred to New York as the "Emerald City."

==== Sydney, Australia ====
In 1987, David Williamson—whose brother-in-law scripted the musical film Oz (1976)—wrote the play Emerald City in which the character Elaine Ross describes Sydney metaphorically as "the Emerald City of Oz." Sydney is where people go expecting their dreams to be fulfilled only to end up with superficial substitutes and broken dreams.

In 2006, the annual Sydney New Year's Eve was entitled "A Diamond Night in Emerald City", where the "Diamond Night" alluded to the 75th anniversary of the opening of the Sydney Harbour Bridge. Subsequently, "Emerald City" has occasionally been used as an unofficial nickname for the City of Sydney.

The head office of the Sydney-based merchant banking and private equity firm Emerald Partners is located on top of the Museum of Contemporary Art Australia building on the Sydney Harbour foreshore, at Circular Quay. The firm was named after Baum's book and the David Williamson play.

Fittingly, the word "Oz" can refer to "Australia" in colloquial Australian speech.

A long-running gossip column in the Sydney Morning Herald, the city's flagship newspaper, is named "Emerald City."

==== Asia ====
Muntinlupa is nicknamed as the "Emerald City of the Philippines" by the Department of Tourism.

=== In cinema & live production ===
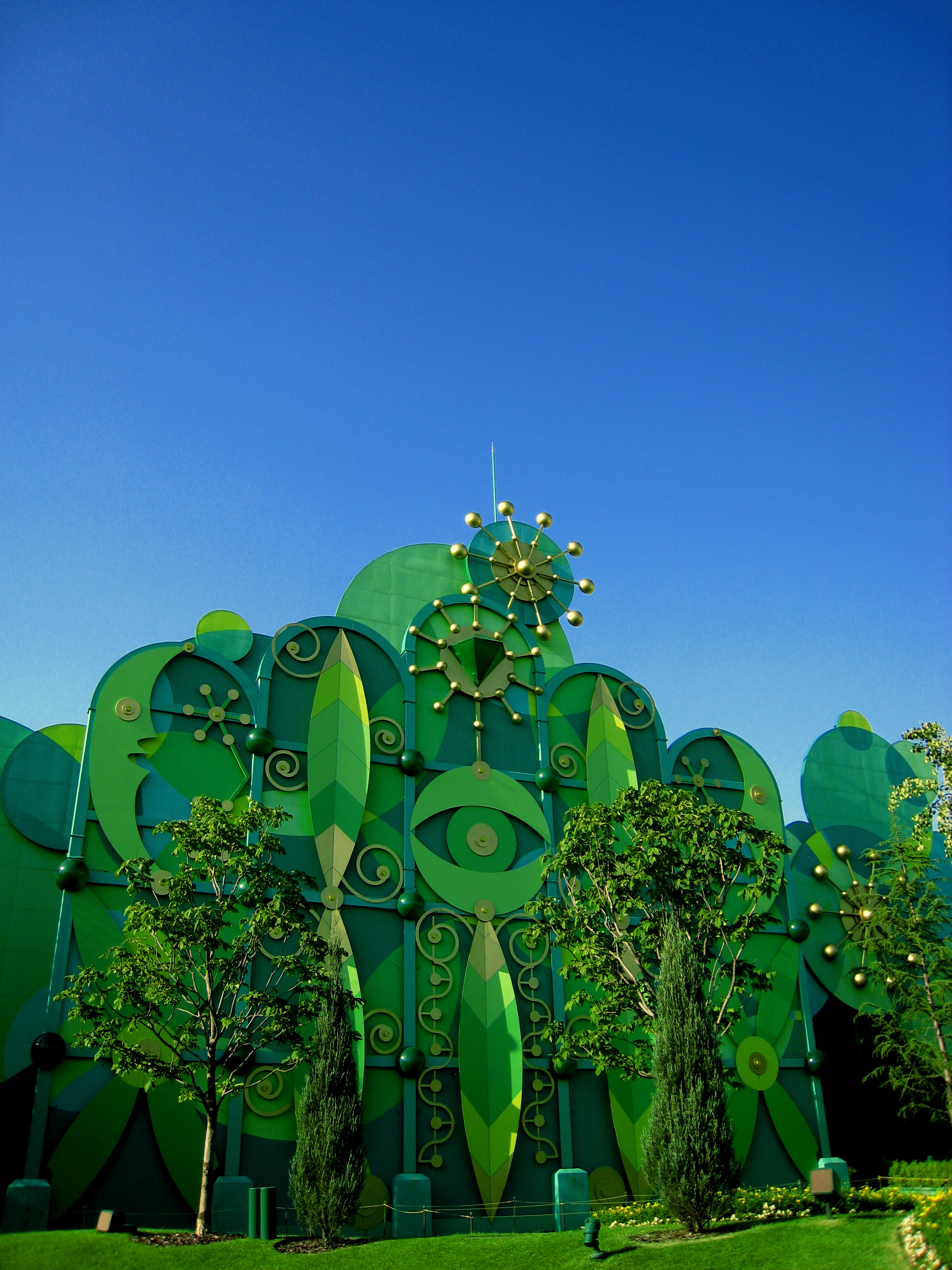
The Emerald City at Universal Studios Japan

- The city appears in the film The Wizard of Oz (1939), directed by Victor Fleming.
- The 1976 Australian musical Oz is a reimagining of Baum's original story, set in 1970s Australia.
- The 1978 musical The Wiz, the plaza and main buildings of the World Trade Center serve as the setting for the Emerald City.
- The city appears in Return to Oz, having been destroyed by the Nome King with all of its inhabitants turned to stone. When Dorothy enters, she finds the city inhabited by Wheelers and ruled over by Mombi. Upon retrieving the ruby slippers from the Nome King, Dorothy uses their power to restore the Emerald City to its former glory.
- The 1987 Australian play Emerald City satirizes the entertainment industry and uses the Emerald City as a metaphor for Sydney, Australia.
- The 2003 stage musical Wicked, written by Stephen Schwartz and Winnie Holzman, depicts the city in the song 'One Short Day', with Glinda and Elphaba visiting the sights of the city on their way to meet the Wizard. Glinda is seen wearing the green spectacles, as per tradition of the city in The Wonderful Wizard of Oz.
- The city appears in the 'One Short Day' sequence of the film Wicked (2024), based on the musical of the same name directed by Jon M. Chu. The sequence includes a musical within the scene named Wiz-O-Mania, advertised as the "absolutely factual story of the wonderful Wizard of Oz".

=== In television ===
- The city appears in the Wizard of Oz TV series. After the Wicked Witch of the West is resurrected by her loyal Flying Monkeys, she casts a spell on the Emerald City that tarnishes it.
- The HBO prison series Oz takes place mostly in the experimental unit Emerald City (colloquially EM City) of the fictional Oswald State Penitentiary, somewhere in New York.
- The city can be seen on the hit ABC TV show Once Upon A Time.
- Emerald City is alluded to through "Central City," one of the chief settings in the Sci Fi television miniseries Tin Man (2007). The show is a re-imagining of Baum's world that alludes to many of the locales of Oz. Central City is a completely computer-generated set, one of the largest for a television series of its time, according to the production designer, Michael Joy. Its scenic design features heavy elements of steampunk and pays visual homage to Blade Runner (1982), according to co-creator Craig van Sickle. Likewise, the "Outer Zone" (O.Z.) is described as a bleak rendition of the beautiful world of Oz.
- The 2017 NBC TV series Emerald City.
- The Emerald City appears in Dorothy and the Wizard of Oz

=== In literature ===
In Gregory Maguire's revisionist Oz novels, Wicked: The Life and Times of the Wicked Witch of the West (1995) and Son of a Witch (2005), the Emerald City is a much darker place than in Baum's novels. It does have splendid palaces and gardens, but sections are also beset by crime and poverty. Son of a Witch introduces Southstairs, an extensive political prison located in the caves below the Emerald City. The green glasses worn by the citizens are often used as a way to stop them from seeing what is going on around them.

=== In video games ===
The video game Emerald City Confidential (2009) portrays the Emerald City as a film noir place with private detectives, widespread corruption, mob bosses, smugglers, and crooked lawyers. Set 40 years after the events of The Wizard of Oz, its described as "Oz, seen through the eyes of Raymond Chandler".

=== Other allusions ===
The Green Zone in Baghdad is sometimes ironically and cynically referred to as the Emerald City.
