= A Lion Among Men =

2008 novel by Gregory Maguire

- Cover
- Author: Gregory Maguire
- Language: English
- Series: The Wicked Years
- Genre: Fantasy
- Publisher: William Morrow
- Publication date: October 14, 2008
- Publication place: United States
- Media type: Print (hardback)
- Pages: 309
- ISBN: 0062098942
- Preceded by: Son of a Witch
- Followed by: Out of Oz

A Lion Among Men is a dark fantasy novel by American writer Gregory Maguire and the third installment in The Wicked Years series, set roughly eight years after Son of a Witch (2005). It was released in the United Kingdom on October 2, 2008, in the United States on October 8, and in the rest of Europe on October 14, 2008.

Prior to the publication of A Lion Among Men, Maguire stated that "this book will be about the differing moralities... among soldiers, for one, and diplomats, for another... about decisions to wage war" and that "one of the main characters is the Cowardly Lion". Maguire's website describes the novel as "seen now through the eyes of the Cowardly Lion—the once tiny cub defended by Elphaba in Wicked."

== Plot ==
“In this much-anticipated third volume of the Wicked Years, we return to Oz, seen now through the eyes of the Cowardly Lion - the once tiny cub defended by Elphaba in Wicked. While civil war looms, a tetchy oracle named Yackle prepares for death. Before her final hour, an enigmatic figure known as Brrr - the Cowardly Lion - arrives searching for information about Elphaba Thropp, the Wicked Witch of the West. As payment, Yackle demands some answers of her own. Brrr surrenders his story: abandoned as a cub, his earliest memories are gluey hazes, and his life's path is no Yellow Brick Road. A Lion Among Men chronicles a battle of wits hastened by the Emerald City's approaching armies.”
