= Gregory Maguire =

American novelist (born 1954)

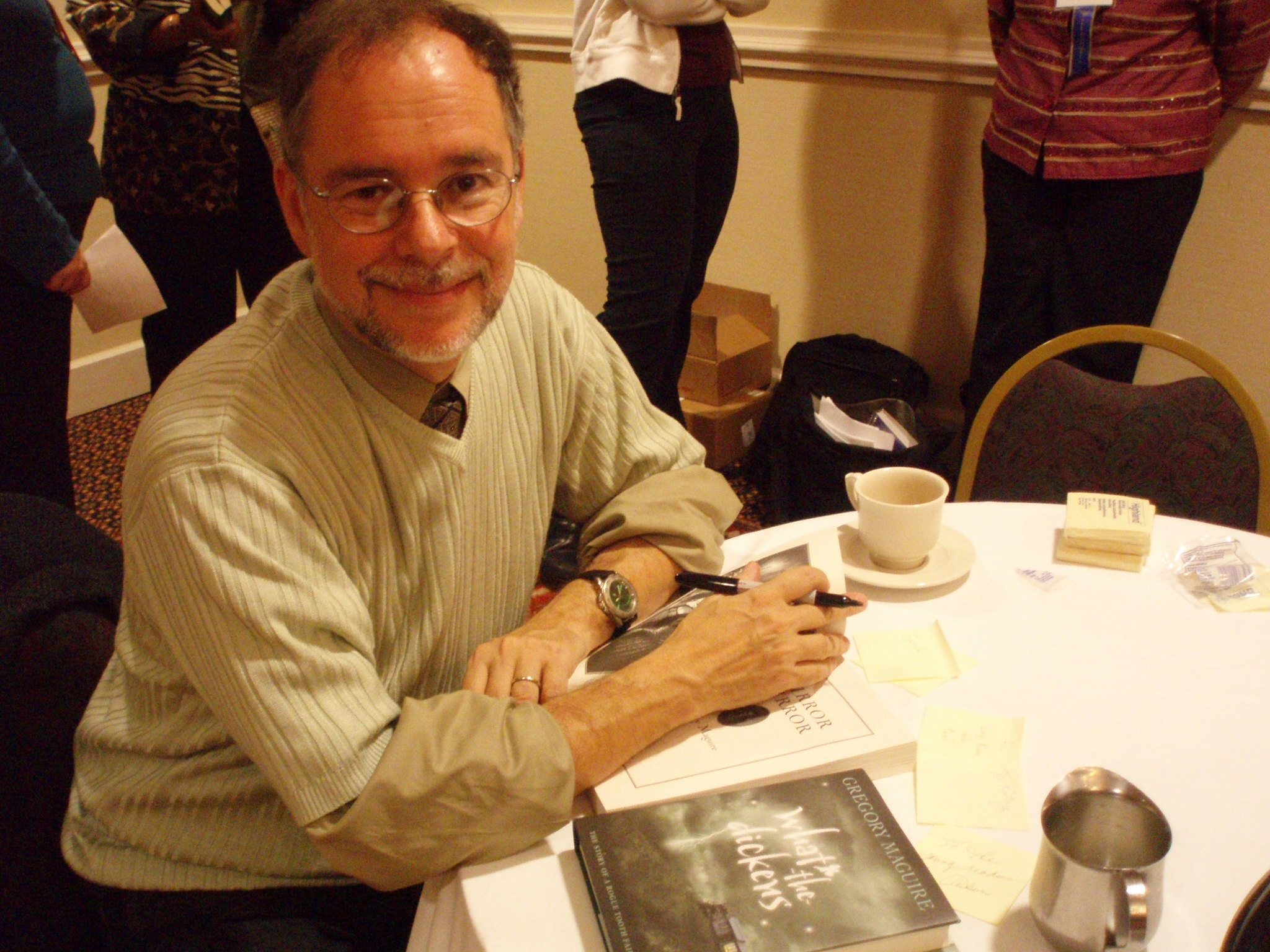
- Maguire in 2007
- Born: June 9, 1954 (age 72); Albany, New York, U.S.
- Education: University at Albany (BA); Simmons University (MA); Tufts University (PhD)
- Occupation: Novelist
- Spouse: Andy Newman (m. 2004)
- Children: 3
- Writing career
- Genres: Fantasy, children's literature
- Website: gregorymaguire.com

Gregory Maguire (born June 9, 1954) is an American novelist. He is the author of Wicked, Confessions of an Ugly Stepsister, and several dozen other novels for adults and children. Many of Maguire's adult novels are inspired by classic children's stories. Maguire published his first novel, The Lightning Time, in 1978. Wicked, published in 1995, was his first novel for adults. It was adapted into a popular Broadway musical in 2003, which was later adapted into a two-part musical film series with the first film released in 2024 and the second film released in 2025.

== Early life ==
Gregory Maguire was born and raised in Albany, New York, the youngest of four children born to Helen and John Maguire. His mother died from complications suffered giving birth to him, which prompted his father to send him to live with an aunt. His aunt relinquished him to a local orphanage when he was six months old. He was reclaimed from the orphanage at age two, after his father's remarriage. Maguire has three half-siblings from his father's second marriage.

Schooled in Catholic institutions through high school, he received a BA degree in English from the State University of New York at Albany in 1976, an MA degree in children's literature from Simmons College in 1978, and a PhD in English and American literature from Tufts University in 1990, with his dissertation titled "Themes in English Language Fantastic Literature for Children, 1938–1988".

== Career ==
In 1978, at the age of 24, Maguire published his first novel, The Lightning Time. Around the same time, he began to realize he was gay. He was a professor and co-director at the Simmons College Center for the Study of Children's Literature from 1979 to 1986. In 1987, Maguire co-founded a nonprofit educational charity, Children's Literature New England, Inc., and was co-director for twenty-five years. He has lived in Dublin, London, and the greater Boston area.

In 1995, Maguire published his first adult novel, Wicked: the Life and Times of the Wicked Witch of the West. A word of mouth success, it sold 500,000 copies by the time the Broadway adaptation opened in 2003. In 2005, ten years after its publication, Wicked spent 26 weeks on the New York Times bestseller list. It was adapted into a popular Broadway musical in 2003, which was later adapted into a two-part musical film series, with the first film released in 2024 and the second film released in 2025.

== Personal life ==
Maguire met American painter Andy Newman in 1997 at the Blue Mountain Center, an artists' and writers' colony. They later wed in one of the first same-sex marriages performed in the state of Massachusetts. They adopted three children: two originally from Cambodia, and a third from Guatemala. They have lived in Concord, Massachusetts since 1999. On April 13, 2009, Maguire and his family were featured on Oprah.

Maguire is a practicing Catholic. He attended Catholic school for 13 years and church at St Vincent de Paul in Albany, New York. While in college, Maguire spent his time cantoring at events for his church and founded a contemporary music group in his parish. Having baptized all three of his adopted children, Maguire attends Mass with his husband and children.

== Bibliography ==
=== Wicked series ===
- The Wicked Years:
  - Wicked (1995)
  - Son of a Witch (2005)
  - A Lion Among Men (2008)
  - Out of Oz (2011)
- Another Day (Wicked sequel trilogy)
  - The Brides of Maracoor (2021)
  - The Oracle of Maracoor (2022)
  - The Witch of Maracoor (2023)
- Childhood prequels
  - Elphie: A Wicked Childhood (2025)
  - Galinda: A Charmed Childhood (2026)

=== For children ===
- The Lightning Time (1978)
- The Daughter of the Moon (1980)
- Lights on the Lake (1981)
- The Dream Stealer (1983)
- The Peace and Quiet Diner (1988)
- I Feel like the Morning Star (1989)
- Lucas Fishbone (1990)
- Missing Sisters (1994)
- Oasis (1996)
- The Good Liar (1997)
- Crabby Cratchitt (2000)
- Leaping Beauty: And Other Animal Fairy Tales (2004)
- The Hamlet Chronicles:
  - Seven Spiders Spinning (1994)
  - Six Haunted Hairdos (1997)
  - Five Alien Elves (1998)
  - Four Stupid Cupids (2000)
  - Three Rotten Eggs (2002)
  - A Couple of April Fools (2004)
  - One Final Firecracker (2005)
- What-the-Dickens: The Story of a Rogue Tooth Fairy (2007)
- Missing Sisters (2009)
- Egg and Spoon (2014)
- Cress Watercress (2022)

=== For adults ===
- Confessions of an Ugly Stepsister (1999)
- Lost (2001)
- Mirror, Mirror (2003)
- The Next Queen of Heaven (2010)
- Tales Told in Oz (2012)
- After Alice (2015)
- Hiddensee: A Tale of the Once and Future Nutcracker (2017)
- A Wild Winter Swan (2020)

=== Short stories ===
- "Scarecrow" (2001), published in Half-Human, edited by Bruce Coville (Note: This is the life story of the Scarecrow from The Wonderful Wizard of Oz, but is not a part of The Wicked Years.)
- "Fee, Fie, Foe et Cetera" (2002), published in The Green Man: Tales from the Mythic Forest
- "The Oakthing" (2004), published in The Faery Reel: Tales from the Twilight Realm
- "Chatterbox", published in I Believe in Water: Twelve Brushes With Religion
- "The Honorary Shepherds" (1994), published in Am I Blue?:Coming Out From The Silence
- "Beyond the Fringe" (1998) published in A Glory of Unicorns
- "The Seven Stage a Comeback" (2000) published in A Wolf at the Door and Other Retold Fairy Tales
- "Matchless: A Christmas Story" (2009)
- "The Silk Road Runs Through Tupperneck, N.H." (2009), published in How Beautiful the Ordinary: Twelve Stories of Identity
- "Missing in Venice" (2011), published in The Chronicles of Harris Burdick
- "In That Country" (2012), published in Parnassus

=== Non-fiction ===
- Innocence and Experience: Essays and Conversations on Children's Literature (ed., with Barbara Harrison) (1987)
- Origins of Story: On Writing for Children (ed., with Barbara Harrison) (1999)
- Making Mischief: A Maurice Sendak Appreciation (2009)
