= Revisionism (fictional) =

Works of fiction revised and retold

In literature, revisionism is the retelling of a conventional or established narrative with significant variations which deliberately "revise" the view shown in the original work.

For example, the 1883 children's book The Merry Adventures of Robin Hood revised the folklore tale of Robin Hood to depict Robin as much more straightforwardly heroic and less as a thief with a code of honor. This adaptation was immensely popular, and influenced all subsequent modern portrayals. Many original works of fantasy appear to retell fairy tales in a revisionist manner.

== See also ==
- Continuation novel
- Copyright protection for fictional characters
- Fan fiction
- Mashup novel
- Parallel novel
- Reboot (fiction)
- Spiritual successor
