= Dorothy of Oz =

Dorothy of Oz may refer to:

- Dorothy of Oz (book), 1989 book written by Roger S. Baum
- Legends of Oz: Dorothy's Return, a 2013 animated film, originally titled Dorothy of Oz
- Dorothy of Oz (manhwa), Korean manhwa, based on The Wonderful Wizard of Oz
- Dorothy Gale, protagonist of the Oz series of books and principal character in adaptations, notably the classic 1939 film The Wizard of Oz
