= The Muppets' Wizard of Oz =

2005 musical fantasy television film

- Official release poster
- Based on: The Muppet Show by Jim Henson The Wonderful Wizard of Oz by L. Frank Baum
- Screenplay by: Debra Frank; Steve Hayes; Tom Martin; Adam F. Goldberg
- Story by: Debra Frank; Steve Hayes
- Directed by: Kirk R. Thatcher
- Starring: Ashanti; Jeffrey Tambor; Quentin Tarantino; David Alan Grier; Queen Latifah; Steve Whitmire; Dave Goelz; Bill Barretta; Eric Jacobson
- Music by: Michael Giacchino
- Countries of origin: United States; Canada
- Original language: English

Production
- Executive producers: Lisa Henson; Brian Henson
- Producer: Bill Barretta
- Cinematography: Tony Westman
- Editor: Gregg Featherman
- Running time: 87 minutes; 100 minutes (Extended Edition)
- Production companies: The Muppets Holding Company; The Jim Henson Company; Fox Television Studios; Touchstone Television

Original release
- Network: ABC
- Release: May 20, 2005

The Muppets' Wizard of Oz is a 2005 musical fantasy television film directed by Kirk R. Thatcher. It is a contemporary adaptation of the 1900 novel The Wonderful Wizard of Oz by L. Frank Baum and the third television film featuring the Muppets. The film stars Ashanti, Jeffrey Tambor, Quentin Tarantino, David Alan Grier, Queen Latifah, as well as Muppet performers Steve Whitmire, Dave Goelz, Bill Barretta, and Eric Jacobson. The story follows young Dorothy Gale, who works in her Aunt Em's diner, but dreams of becoming a singer somewhere beyond her small Kansas town. Swept up by a tornado, in her trailer home with pet prawn Toto, she lands in Oz and embarks on a journey to meet the Wizard who can help make her dreams come true.

Following the Walt Disney Company's acquisition of the rights to the Muppets in 2004, pre-production took place throughout February 2004, and principal photography began seven months later. The Muppets' Wizard of Oz was co-produced by the Muppets Holding Company, the Jim Henson Company, Fox Television Studios, and Touchstone Television, marking the Jim Henson Company's final involvement with the Muppets after more than five decades of ownership. ABC made several changes after the initial script was written, ultimately deciding to adapt plot elements from Baum's original novel as well as the 1939 musical film adaptation. The Muppets' Wizard of Oz became a musical, and included five new songs composed by Michael Giacchino.

It is the first Muppets film without the involvement of veteran performer Jerry Nelson following his 2004 retirement from physical performing; his characters Lew Zealand, Floyd Pepper, Crazy Harry, Camilla the Chicken and Statler were instead performed by Bill Barretta, John Kennedy, Rickey Boyd, Alice Dinnean, Whitmire respectively, while Barretta also debuts as the new permanent performer of Dr. Teeth, a character originally performed by Jim Henson. The production also marked the feature film debut of Eric Jacobson as the performer of Sam Eagle, a character originally performed by Frank Oz.

The Muppets' Wizard of Oz premiered on April 27, 2005, at the Tribeca Film Festival, and made its television premiere on ABC's The Wonderful World of Disney on May 20, 2005. The film received mixed to negative reviews from critics, who felt that the film was too mature for young audiences and that the cameos and popular culture references were unnecessary.

== Plot ==
Dorothy Gale is an orphaned teenage girl living in a trailer park in Kansas with her Aunt Em and Uncle Henry. Her dream of becoming a singer is slim, but when she overhears that the Muppets are looking for a backup singer, Dorothy hurries to the audition and gives them a demo CD. In returning home, the civil defense sirens sound as a tornado is headed for Dorothy's trailer park. When Aunt Em and Uncle Henry run into the county storm shelter for safety, Dorothy hurries back to her family's mobile home to get Toto, her pet prawn. She does not make it out in time, and the two are swept by the tornado across the vast fields of Kansas. When Dorothy climbs out of the wreckage, she finds that Toto can talk and that she is in Munchkinland, part of the vast Land of Oz.

The Munchkins inform Dorothy that the land's ruler the Wizard, has the power to grant her wish of becoming a famous singer. She meets the Good Witch of the North and receives a pair of magic silver slippers from the Wicked Witch of the East, who was killed when Dorothy's trailer fell on her. Dorothy and Toto embark on a journey on the yellow brick road to meet the Wizard of Oz.

On her journey, she meets a Scarecrow (Kermit the Frog), a Tin Thing (Gonzo), and a Cowardly Lion (Fozzie Bear). They are also seeking the Wizard of Oz to give them a brain, heart, and courage, respectively. The group meets various obstacles before arriving at the Emerald City and meeting the Wizard. Before he grants their wishes, the Wizard sends Dorothy and her friends to retrieve the Wicked Witch of the West's magic eye, a tool she uses to see anything she desires in the Land of Oz.

The Wicked Witch of the West sees them coming and sends the Flying Monkeys to deal with them. The Witch and the Flying Monkeys capture Dorothy, Toto and Lion while Scarecrow and Tin Thing are dismantled. Toto calls the Munchkins, who set him and Dorothy free and hold up the witch. Dorothy kicks the witch into her own "bottled water bath," which contains tap water (to which she is severely allergic). This causes the Wicked Witch of the West to melt. Dorothy finds the magic eye floating in the tub unharmed and grabs it.

Dorothy gains control of the Flying Monkeys and has them rebuild Scarecrow and Tin Thing. Then she and her friends travel back to the Emerald City to have their wishes granted. When they all storm into the Wizard's room, they discover it is merely a Hollywood effects stage and that the Wizard is just an ordinary man. He asked for the witch's eye so that she could not see him for who he really was. Even so, he still proceeds to grant their wishes. Dorothy finally becomes a singer in the Land of Oz, but realizes that all she ever really wanted was to go back home and be with her family. After traveling back to Munchkinland, she meets Glinda the Good Witch of the South, who tells her that by clicking her heels together three times, she will be able to go anywhere she desires. Saying "take me home to Aunt Em", Dorothy is spun by the slippers' magic into Kansas and finds out that she has been chosen to sing with the Muppets.

== Cast ==
- Ashanti as Dorothy Gale: A Kansas teen dreaming of leaving her home and becoming a singer.
- Queen Latifah as Aunt Em: Dorothy's aunt and co-owner of the family diner in Kansas.
- David Alan Grier as Uncle Henry: Dorothy's uncle and co-owner of the family diner.
- Jeffrey Tambor as Francis Cornfine / The Wizard of Oz: The legendary Wizard of Oz.
- Quentin Tarantino as himself: In a short appearance with Kermit the Frog, Tarantino discusses violent ideas on how to stop the Wicked Witch of the West.

Extended version

- Kelly Osbourne as post-makeover Dorothy Gale: Appears in a brief cameo as Dorothy when she first comes out of the Magic Makeover Machine in Emerald City.
- Edward Hibbert as the stage manager (uncredited): Appears when Dorothy arrives to give her CD demo version to the Muppets.

=== Muppets performers ===
- Steve Whitmire as:
  - Kermit the Frog as Himself/Scarecrow: A scarecrow in search of a brain. Scarecrow is constantly mocked by the crows in Oz, as he is defenseless and cannot do anything to stop them. Prior to Dorothy's journey, Kermit organizes a talent scout for a star for a new show. After her return, he hires her.
  - Beaker: He appears as an Emerald City Technician. Beaker also appears at the end in the Muppets' show.
  - Rizzo the Rat as Himself/Mayor of Munchkinland. He occasionally aids Dorothy when she is in danger. Prior to Dorothy's journey, Rizzo is seen assisting Bean Bunny in loading equipment into the Muppets' bus. He returns for the Muppets' show in the climax.
  - Bean Bunny: Prior to Dorothy's journey, Bean Bunny is seen assisting Rizzo the Rat in loading equipment into the Muppets' bus.
  - Statler as Kalidah Critic #1. He heckles Dorothy and her friends as they try to cross a log.
  - Foo-Foo: Foo-Foo appears as the pet dog of the Wicked Witch of the West.
- Dave Goelz as:
  - The Great Gonzo as Himself/The Tin Thing: A robot in search of a heart. Originally human, the Tin Thing was turned into a robot by the Wicked Witch of the West who was angry at him for asking to leave her palace and marry his fiancée, Camilla the Chicken. He also appears at the end of the film in the Muppets' show.
  - Dr. Bunsen Honeydew: He appears as an Emerald City Technician. He also appears at the end of the film in the Muppets' show.
  - Waldorf as Kalidah Critic #2. He and the other Kalidah Critic heckle Dorothy and her friends as they try to cross a log.
  - Zoot: He performs backup for the songs "Naptime", and for "The Witch is in the House", and appears at the end of the film in the Muppets' new show.
- Bill Barretta as:
  - Pepe the King Prawn as Toto: Dorothy's pet prawn and first companion on her journey. In Kansas, Toto was a prawn that lived in a fish bowl in Dorothy's room.
  - Dr. Teeth: He performs "Naptime", and also performs in "The Witch is in the House". He appears again at the end of the film in the Muppets' show.
  - Johnny Fiama: He appears as one of the henchmen of the Wicked Witch of the West, and is supposedly her love interest.
  - Lew Zealand: He briefly appears in Emerald City at the red carpet event, asking Dorothy to sign his boomerang fish.
  - The Swedish Chef: He provides the Bran Flakes for the Wizard.
  - Rowlf the Dog: He briefly appears at the end of the film in the Muppets' new show.
  - Bubba the Rat: He assists the Mayor of Munchkin Land in getting Dorothy and the Lion out of Poppyfields.
- Eric Jacobson as:
  - Miss Piggy as herself: She appears early on with Kermit, and tries to get rid of Dorothy. She returns at the end of the film for the Muppets' show. She also appears as the Four Witch Sisters of Oz:
    - The Wicked Witch of the West: The Wicked Witch that terrifies all that meet her.
    - Tattypoo the Good Witch of the North: The Good Witch that gives Dorothy the silver slippers.
    - Glinda the Good Witch of the South: The other Good Witch that shows Dorothy how to get home. She becomes infatuated with the Scarecrow, a not-so-subtle nod to Kermit and Miss Piggy's relationship.
    - The Wicked Witch of the East: The original owner of the magic slippers who was killed by Dorothy's falling mobile home.
  - Fozzie Bear as Himself/Cowardly Lion: A nervous and frightened lion stand-up comic that accompanies Dorothy and the others on their journey. Fozzie shows up at the end of the film in the Muppets' show.
  - Animal: He performs in the songs "Naptime" and "The Witch is in the House", and appears at the end of the film in the Muppets' new show.
  - Sam Eagle: He appears as the Guardian of the Gates.
- Brian Henson as:
  - Sal Manilla as Sal, a Flying Monkey: He accompanies Johnny for much of the film.
- Kevin Clash as:
  - Clifford: He appears as the manager of the Poppy Field Club.
  - Mulch: He appears briefly in Poppyfields.
  - Black Dog as a Flying Monkey
- John Kennedy as:
  - Angel Marie as a Flying Monkey: A servant of the Wicked Witch of the West.
  - Floyd Pepper: He performs in "Naptime" and "The Witch is in the House", and appears at the end of the film in the Muppets' new show.
- Rickey Boyd as:
  - Scooter: He appears as the Wizard's Assistant.
  - Crazy Harry as a Flying Monkey
- Tyler Bunch as:
  - Janice: She performs in "Naptime" and "The Witch is in the House", and appears at the end of the film in the Muppets' new show.
  - Aretha as a Flying Monkey
- Julianne Buescher as
  - Wizard's Green Lady and Chicken Forms
- John Henson as
  - Sweetums as a Flying Monkey: He provides the keys for the Cowardly Lion's escape from his cage.
- Mike Quinn as
  - Calico as a Flying Monkey
- Allan Trautman as
  - Crow: He bothers the Scarecrow.
  - Old Tom as a Flying Monkey
- Drew Massey as
  - Spotted Dick as a Flying Monkey
- Alice Dinnean as:
  - Camilla the Chicken: The Tin Thing's girlfriend. The two are reunited later on in the film.

In addition, Whitmire and Goelz make on-screen cameos as audience members at Aunt Em's Diner during the finale.

== Production ==
When the Walt Disney Company acquired the Muppets franchise from the Jim Henson Company in February 2004, the Muppets were re-introduced to the public by marketing products and guest appearing on television shows such as Good Morning America and America's Funniest Home Videos. After a new film titled The Muppets' Wizard of Oz was announced by The Jim Henson Company, Fox Television Studios, Touchstone Television, and the Muppets Holding Company signed on to help produce it. This was the last Muppets production to be produced by the Jim Henson Company once Disney purchased the rights to the Muppets franchise.

Filming took place throughout September 2004 in Vancouver, British Columbia. Before filming, ABC announced that the production would adapt elements from the original 1900 book, rather than the 1939 film, such as the Silver Shoes instead of the Ruby slippers. On August 25, 2004, it was announced that Hilary Duff, Jessica Simpson, and Ashanti had auditioned for the role of Dorothy Gale, but Ashanti had won the part. When asked about how she felt about working with the Muppets, Ashanti replied, "I love children, and to me, the Muppets are just like little kids." She also stated, "The director had to give me a few pointers and tips for acting with them, but the most important thing that I learned was to keep eye contact." Also in August 2004, BBC News reported that Quentin Tarantino would appear in the film.

== Music ==
Michael Giacchino, who had previously worked on the video game Muppet Monster Adventure, would become an Academy Award-winning composer. Giacchino worked alongside Jeannie Lurie, Adam Cohen, Debra Frank and Steve L. Hayes to write five original songs for the film: "Kansas", "When I'm with You", "The Witch is in the House", "Nap Time" and "Good Life".

"When I'm with You" was nominated for a Primetime Emmy in the Outstanding Music and Lyrics category. Ashanti and the Muppet cast, mainly Barretta and Jacobson, contributed the vocals for each of the songs. Ted Kryczko produced the album, Booker T. Washington White prepared the songs for recording, and Paul Silveira and Brandon Christy mixed the songs.

=== Soundtrack ===
Best of the Muppets featuring The Muppets' Wizard of Oz

Soundtrack album
- Released: May 17, 2005
- Studios: Walt Disney Studios, Burbank
- Genres: Pop rock, soundtrack
- Length: 29:52
- Label: Walt Disney
- Producer: Sam Pottle

The Muppets chronology
The Muppet Show: Music, Mayhem, and More (2002)	Best of the Muppets featuring The Muppets' Wizard of Oz (2005)	The Muppets: A Green and Red Christmas (2006)

The Muppets' Wizard of Oz official soundtrack was released on May 17, 2005. The album was an enhanced soundtrack titled Best of Muppets featuring The Muppets' Wizard of Oz as it was not a film-specific soundtrack, but a compilation album featuring the Muppets' best songs from The Muppet Show as well as songs from the film.

Track listing

No.	Title	Lyrics	Music	Artist	Length
1.	"Kansas"	Jeannie Lurie	Brandon Christy	Ashanti	2:15
2.	"When I'm With You"	Jeannie Lurie, Debra Frank, Steve L. Hayes	Michael Giacchino, Adam Cohen	Ashanti, Kermit the Frog, Gonzo, Fozzie Bear, Pepe	2:43
3.	"The Witch Is in the House"	Lurie	Giacchino, Christy, and Cohen	Miss Piggy & Dr. Teeth and the Electric Mayhem	2:59
4.	"Calling All Munchkins"	Frank, Hayes	Giacchino	The Munchkin Tap-your-knuckle Choir	0:17
5.	"Good Life"	Lurie	Christy	Ashanti	2:29
6.	"Nap Time"	Christy	Christy	Dr. Teeth and the Electric Mayhem	1:29
7.	"The Muppet Show Theme"	Jim Henson	Sam Pottle	The Muppets	1:16
8.	"Mah Nà Mah Nà"	Piero Umiliani	Umiliani	Mahna Mahna and Two Snowths	2:05
9.	"(It's Not Easy) Bein' Green"	Joe Raposo	Raposo	Kermit the Frog	2:19
10.	"Rainbow Connection"	Paul Williams	Kenneth Ascher	Kermit the Frog	3:16
11.	"Lady of Spain"	Stanley J. Damerell	Tolchard Evans	Marvin Suggs	1:01
12.	"Halfway Down the Stairs"	A.A. Milne		Robin the Frog	2:26
13.	"What Now My Love?"	Carl Sigman	Gilbert Bécaud	Miss Piggy	1:45
14.	"Tenderly"	Jack Lawrence	Walter Gross	Dr. Teeth and the Electric Mayhem	2:00
15.	"Happy Feet"	Jack Yellen	Milton Ager	Kermit the Frog and Frog Chorus	1:30
Total length:					29:52

== Release ==
The Muppets' Wizard of Oz premiered on April 27, 2005, at the Tribeca Film Festival. The television premiere was on May 20, 2005, at 8:00 pm on ABC in the US. It aired in Canada on CBC Television, and in the UK on December 18, 2005. In the US, the film's official soundtrack was released on May 17, 2005. Buena Vista Home Entertainment released the DVD and VHS in both the US and in international territories. The film was released to Region 1 DVD and VHS on August 9, 2005. The Region 2 DVD was released on April 3, 2006. The film was rated U by the British Board of Film Classification, K-3 in Finland, and G in Australia. The DVD and VHS were released under the title Extended Version in the United States and Anniversary Edition in international markets. The U.S. Extended Version included less than 15 minutes of additional footage not featured in the broadcast version, including a cameo by Kelly Osbourne. This edition was presented in a 1.33:1 (pan and scan) aspect ratio. The international Anniversary Edition release retained the original 1.78:1 (anamorphic widescreen) aspect ratio but featured the original, unextended cut of the film. Both editions included the same bonus features, such as an extended interview with Quentin Tarantino, a blooper reel, and a behind-the-scenes documentary hosted by Pepe the King Prawn. During Macy's annual Flower Show promotion, the store's windows along Broadway featured floral displays depicting scenes from the movie, accompanied by related merchandise including plush dolls.

=== Critical reception ===
7.75 million viewers watched The Muppets' Wizard of Oz on its television premiere night in the United States; it ranked as the forty-second most-watched television program of the week. Michael Schneider of Variety wrote that it "performed solidly ... particularly with adults 18–34, teens and kids." The film received negative reviews from critics. At Rotten Tomatoes, the movie currently holds an approval rating of 30% based on 10 reviews, with an average rating of 4.3/10.

For the film's positive response, Kevin Carr stated that "When you dig down and actually find (and watch) the new Muppet material, some of the magic is still there." MaryAnn Johanson of Flick Filosopher said that, "It's not on a par with the Muppet movie madness of old, but it's darn close." According to the Bums Corner's review the film was a "treat for all ages, and that it was a colorful, musical, humorous romp." Keith Allen of Movie Rapture gave the film 2.5 stars out of 3, explaining that the film's humor was surprisingly clever, and that the film would frequently make you laugh. Mutant Reviewers commented that although the Muppet deal with Walt Disney was "disappointing", the film managed to be funny and witty.

In contrast, David Nusair of Reel Film Reviews warned that the film was "strictly for kids." Nusair felt that although Ashanti can sing, she cannot act. Joshua Tyler of Cinema Blend felt that Dorothy visiting the Wizard of Oz to become a star instead of going back home was a mistake, and that it showed how shallow society has become. R.J. Carter of The Trades gave the film a B−, also stating that Dorothy's wish to become a star was a selfish one. Ultimate Disney's review found that the extended DVD version of the film did more harm than good; Andy Dursin of The Aisle Seat said that the original film was "dull" and that the extended version was an improvement. Cold Fusion Video felt that although the film was entertaining, it lacked the heart and wit of Jim Henson's Muppet films. Bryan Pope of DVD Verdict said that the film drained the Muppets of their spirit and was slightly gratuitous. Techtite TV reviews felt that the film was done poorly on all levels, and that the film was on the higher end of TV-PG.

Other reviewers felt that the film's attempt to appeal to an older, more mature audience was ultimately a bad idea. Kerry Bennett of Parent Previews warned that it sometimes steered "dangerously off course" due to an excess of sexual content and violence. Referential humor to the marriage of Jennifer Lopez, Manolo Blahnik style silver shoes, and properties such as Girls Gone Wild, The Passion of the Christ, Apocalypse Now and Kill Bill: Volume 1 were seen as too mature. Cold Fusion Video judged the Kelly Osbourne cameo in the extended edition as "pointless". Dursin contrasted the two guest appearances and found that the Tarantino cameo dragged the film down. Critics were split on the merits of ABC's modernized adaptation to rely on plot elements from the original novel instead of the iconic 1939 film.

== See also ==
- List of television films produced for American Broadcasting Company
