= Yellow brick road =

Element in the novel The Wonderful Wizard of Oz by L. Frank Baum

- The Oz series location
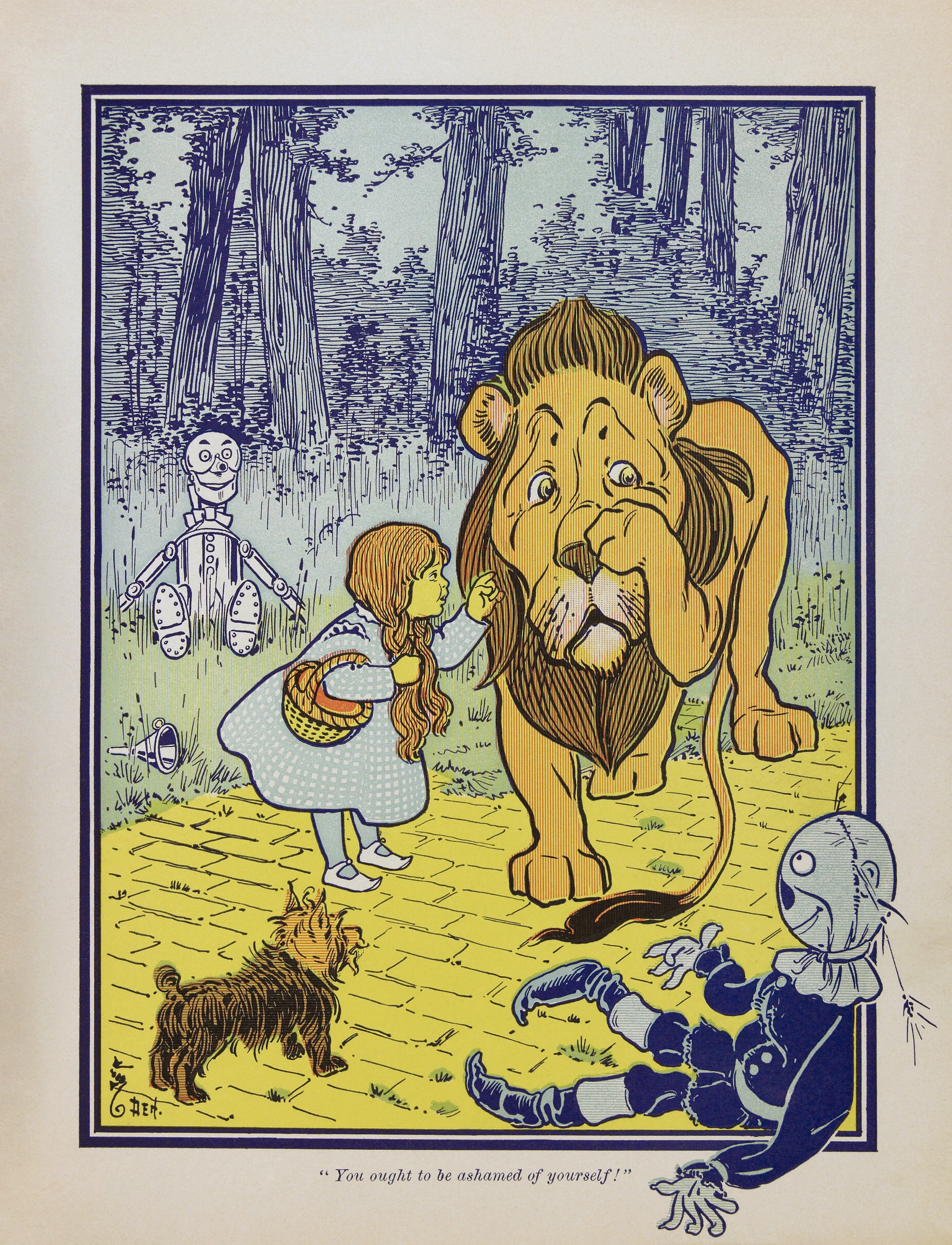
- Dorothy and her companions befriend the Cowardly Lion, while traveling on the yellow brick road--illustration by W. W. Denslow (1900).
- Created by: L. Frank Baum
- Genre: Classics children's books

In-universe information
- Type: Road paved with yellow bricks, leading to its destination--Emerald City

The yellow brick road is a central element in the 1900 children's novel The Wonderful Wizard of Oz by American author L. Frank Baum. It also appears in several sequel Oz books such as The Marvelous Land of Oz (1904) and The Patchwork Girl of Oz (1913).

The road's most notable depiction is in the classic 1939 MGM musical film The Wizard of Oz, loosely based on Baum's first Oz book. In the novel's first edition, the road is mostly referred to as the "Road of Yellow Bricks". In the original story and in later films based on it such as The Wiz (1978), Dorothy Gale must find the road before embarking on her journey through Oz, as the tornado did not deposit her farmhouse directly in front of it as in the 1939 film.

== Road's history ==
The following is an excerpt from the third chapter of The Wonderful Wizard of Oz, in which Dorothy sets off to see the Wizard:

There were several roads nearby, but it did not take Dorothy long to find the one paved with yellow bricks. Within a short time, she was walking briskly toward the Emerald City; her Silver Shoes tinkling merrily on the hard, yellow roadbed.

The road is first introduced in the third chapter of The Wonderful Wizard of Oz. It begins in the heart of the eastern quadrant called Munchkin Country in the Land of Oz. and leads to the imperial capital of Oz, the Emerald City, which is located in the exact center of the land. The protagonist, Dorothy Gale, is forced to search for the road before she can begin her quest to seek the Wizard, eventually finding it after meeting with the Munchkins and the Good Witch of the North. Later in the book, Dorothy and her companions, the Scarecrow, Tin Woodman, and Cowardly Lion, discover that the road has fallen into disrepair in some parts of the land, having several broken chasms ending at dangerous cliffs with deadly drops. At the end of the book, Dorothy learns that neither the Emerald City nor the yellow brick road existed prior to Oz's arrival. When Oscar Diggs arrived in Oz via hot-air balloon that had been swept away in a storm, the people of the land were convinced he was a great "Wizard" who had finally come to fulfill a long-awaited prophecy. In the power vacuum left by the recent fall of Oz's mortal King Pastoria and the mysterious disappearance of his baby daughter, Princess Ozma, Diggs immediately proclaimed himself as Oz's new dominant ruler and had his people build the road and city in his honor.

In the second Oz book, The Marvelous Land of Oz, Tip and his companion, Jack Pumpkinhead, likewise follow a yellow brick road to reach the Emerald City while traveling from Oz's northern quadrant, the Gillikin Country. In the book The Patchwork Girl of Oz, it is revealed that there are two yellow brick roads from Munchkin Country to the Emerald City: according to the Shaggy Man, Dorothy took the longer and more dangerous one in The Wonderful Wizard of Oz.

In the 1939 film, a red brick road can be seen intertwined with the yellow brick road, both spiraling out from the same point but leading in different directions. In the 1985 film Return to Oz, Dorothy returns to Oz long after being sent back home to Kansas from her first visit; she finds the yellow brick road in ruins by the hands of the evil Nome King who also conquered the Emerald City. She defeats him and the city is restored to its original glory, and presumably the road is as well.

== Real yellow brick roads ==
There are various accounts of what inspired the yellow brick road. One account says it is a brick road in Peekskill, New York, where L. Frank Baum attended Peekskill Military Academy. Other accounts say it was inspired by a road paved with yellow bricks near Holland, Michigan, where Baum spent summers. Ithaca, New York also makes a claim for being Baum's inspiration. He opened a road tour of his musical, The Maid of Arran, in Ithaca, and met his wife, Maud, while she was attending Cornell University. At the time, yellow bricks paved local roads. Portions of U.S. Route 54 in Kansas have been designated "the yellow brick road". Dallas, Texas makes a claim that Baum once stayed at a downtown hotel during his newspaper career (located near what is now the Triple Underpass) at a time when the streets were paved with wooden blocks of Bois D'Arc also known as Osage Orange. Supposedly, after a rainstorm the sun came out and he saw a bright yellow brick road from the window of his room.

Two direct, published references to the origin of the yellow brick road came from Baum's own descendants: his son, Frank, in To Please a Child and the other by his great-grandson, Roger S. Baum, who stated, "Most people don't realize that The Wizard of Oz was written in Chicago, and the yellow brick road was named after winding cobblestone roads in Holland, Michigan, where great-grandfather spent vacations with his family."

The Vision Oz Fund was established in November 2009 to raise funds that will be used to help increase the awareness, enhancement, and further development of Oz-related attractions and assets in Wamego, Kansas. The first fundraiser is under way and includes selling personalized engraved yellow bricks, which will become part of the permanent walkway (aka "The Yellow Brick Road") in downtown Wamego.

In 2019, a commemorative yellow brick road was installed in Chicago's Humboldt Park at the site of Baum's 1899 residence.

== See also ==
- Goodbye Yellow Brick Road
- Political interpretations of The Wonderful Wizard of Oz
