= Dorothy of Oz (book) =

Book by Roger S. Baum

- Author: Roger S. Baum
- Language: English
- Series: The Oz Books
- Genre: Fantasy children's novel
- Publication date: 1989
- Publication place: United States
- OCLC: 19722581

Dorothy of Oz is a 1989 children's novel written by L. Frank Baum's great-grandson Roger S. Baum. The book details Dorothy Gale returning to the Land of Oz when a Jester has been using the wand of the Wicked Witch of the West (which also contained the ghost of the Wicked Witch of the West) to take over the Land of Oz.

== Plot summary ==
Several weeks after returning to Kansas from the Land of Oz, Dorothy Gale looks out of her bedroom window and sees a bright and beautiful rainbow on the horizon. She notices that the rainbow is approaching her and Toto as both of them run towards it. Dorothy starts to see Glinda, who tells Dorothy that she must return to Oz so that she can save the Scarecrow, the Tin Man, and the Cowardly Lion. Dorothy and Toto reclaim the silver shoes as they find a note from Glinda and Princess Ozma stating that the silver shoes can’t take her to the Land of Oz and back, for the Impassable Desert has taken away much of their power.

Dorothy and Toto arrive in the Land of Oz, where the items that Dorothy has in her pocket are a small mirror, a safety pin, a glass bottle, and four of Aunt Em's homemade oatmeal cookies. Dorothy and Toto were wondering which direction they should take when they encounter a molasses-covered owl named Wiser. Wiser tells Dorothy that she is in Gillikin Country and tells her to head to Candy County and ask the Great Royal Marshmallow that rules over Candy Country. Following an incident where Dorothy was busted by a candy apple sheriff for breaking the "Do Not Pick the Lollipops" rule and helping the Great Royal Marshmallow with his stomach ache enough to get her pardoned, she receives some supplies from him

Arriving at Princess Gayelette's palace, Dorothy and Toto encounter the castle's Jester who welcomes them. The Jester tells them that Princess Gayelette and Prince Quelala have gone missing, adding that they disappeared during a party at the palace which had become haunted and points them in the direction of the castle. When Dorothy and Toto enter the palace, they find a wand that belonged to the Wicked Witch of the West lying on the table. With Scarecrow, Tin Woodman, Cowardly Lion, and the China Princess as his prisoners, Jester is talked into letting them accompany Dorothy to Glinda. He agrees, but Toto must stay behind.

Dorothy and her group ran into Wiser again as Dorothy tells him of her next mission involving going to Quadling County to meet with Glinda. Wiser tells Dorothy to build a boat and drive it down the Munchkin River. Wiser tells Dorothy that the wood for the boat must come from the Talking Trees that grow along the banks of the Munchkin River. The Talking Trees are persuaded to lend their limbs to them due to them knowing Wiser. The tree limbs are combined with wood, straw, vines, and a hollow log giving it a tugboat appearance. It starts to speak when a face is made from paint from water and wild berries and it is called Tugg.

Dorothy, Scarecrow, Tin Woodman, Cowardly Lion, China Princess, and Tugg experience a lot of things on the Munchkin River like a cursed maze run by a gamekeeper that was created from Purplefield by the Wicked Witch of the West's curse, a dark tunnel filled with dragons who are then promised a new home, and a displaced brick from the yellow brick road as well as an encounter with the Wicked Witch of the East's ghost.

After returning the China Princess to the China Country and Tugg returning to speak to the Talking Trees, Dorothy, Scarecrow, Tin Woodman, and Cowardly Lion are met by Sawhorse who carries them past the Hammer-Heads' hill to Glinda's palace. Glinda and Princess Ozma learn about the Jester using the Wicked Witch of the West's wand in violation of Princess Ozma's rules.

Returning to China Country, the China Princess is told by Dorothy of a plan that would involve making a china replica of Glinda for her and the others to hide in. With the Sawhorse moving at a speed passed the Hammer-Heads' hill enough to not break the china. Arriving at Princess Gaylette's castle, Wiser arrives to help Dorothy unload the china.

Dorothy reminds the Jester that jesters are supposed to make people happy, causing the Jester to freeze in his tracks as the Wicked Witch of the West's ghost urges the Jester to turn Dorothy into a china doll. The Jester gives up the wand as the Wicked Witch of the West's ghost fades away. Thus, the spell is broken and everyone is returned to normal. The Scarecrow, the Tin Man, the Cowardly Lion, and Toto rejoice now that the spell is broken. When the Cowardly Lion asks Dorothy on what she plans to do with the Wicked Witch of the West's wand, the Scarecrow and the Tin Man plan to keep the wand locked up in a case until they can give it to Glinda and Princess Ozma.

When Dorothy asks Princess Gayelette and Prince Quelala if the Jester can stay and jest for them again as a way to prove that he is sorry, Princess Gayelette accepts Dorothy's deals and has the Jester entertain them again. Princess Ozma arrived with Glinda and the Wizard of Oz telling Dorothy that they are proud of her and that the Great Book of Records stated that Dorothy would overcome the Wicked Witch's magic. Glinda plans to take the Wicked Witch of the West's wand and put it someplace where it won't cause any more trouble. The sound of a foghorn brings everyone to the edge of the Munchkin River as Tugg arrives with Wiser and the dragons stating that they have found a place near Princess Gayelette's palace for the dragons to live in. Dorothy knew that it was time for her to return to Kansas and says her goodbyes to Scarecrow, Tin Man, Cowardly Lion, Tugg, and Wiser. Dorothy then uses the power of the silver shoes to take her back to Kansas.

Dorothy and Toto return to Kansas where they reunite with Aunt Em and Uncle Henry. The four of them then see a rainbow in the twilight sky which Dorothy has not seen before. Dorothy knows that is must be Princess Ozma, Glinda, and the Wizard of Oz's way of saying goodbye to her. The rainbow shimmers over the prairie with all the bright and true colors of the Land of Oz.

== Film adaptation ==
Summertime Entertainment (the family entertainment division of Alpine Pictures) has adapted the book into the film Legends of Oz: Dorothy's Return, which was released in 2014.
