= Lion of Oz =

- Home video cover art
- Directed by: Tim Deacon
- Written by: Elana Lesser; Cliff Ruby
- Based on: Lion of Oz and the Badge of Courage by Roger S. Baum
- Produced by: Sophie Chicoine; Loris Kramer Lunsford; Michel Lemire; Jacques Pettigrew
- Starring: Henry Beckman; Jason Priestley; Tim Curry; Dom DeLuise; Bob Goldthwait; Kathy Griffin; Jane Horrocks; Lynn Redgrave
- Edited by: Claudette Duff
- Music by: Jennifer Wilson
- Production company: CinéGroupe
- Distributed by: Sony Wonder (US / Canada); Video Collection International (UK)
- Release date: September 26, 2000 (USA)
- Running time: 74 minutes
- Countries: Canada; United Kingdom
- Language: English

Lion of Oz is a 2000 animated film set before the 1900 children's novel The Wonderful Wizard of Oz. It tells the story of how the Cowardly Lion, formerly part of the Omaha Circus, came to be in Oz and how he stopped the Wicked Witch of the East from getting the Flower of Oz. It is based upon the 1995 book Lion of Oz and the Badge of Courage by Roger S. Baum (great-grandson of L. Frank Baum, the original author of the Oz books). It was announced by CinéGroupe and Sony Wonder and was released in 2000.

== Plot ==
A lonely lion is shown in a circus, where everyone is afraid of him apart from his friend, the eccentric and virtuous balloonist Oscar Diggs. One evening, Oscar takes Lion up on his balloon and gives him a Badge of Courage. A thunderstorm drags them to the Land of Oz and Lion falls from the balloon.

Lion comes across a living Oak tree being harassed by flying monkeys. Lion frightens them off and the tree thanks him. The Wicked Witch of the East appears, claiming that Oscar is her prisoner. She demands that Lion find the Flower of Oz for her or he will never see Oscar again. Tree explains to Lion that the Witch is bent on conquering Oz, but is prevented by the Flower.

Lion saves the fairy Starburst from drowning. Starburst and her friends tell Lion to go to a certain castle to find the Flower. Lion meets a springy teddy bear, named Silly Oz-bul, who follows Lion to the castle, where they are confronted by a toy soldier, named Captain Fitzgerald. They are joined by a young girl named Wimzik and her toy ballerina, Caroline.

Finding out from Gloom about Lion's interference, the Witch teleports Fitzgerald to a dungeon. But while there, the captain learns from a flying monkey guard the Witch was lying about Oscar being her prisoner.

The friends come to a waterfall with a silver bridge to a floating island. Silly attempts to cross the bridge, which turns out to be an illusion. Lion saves him, from falling over the cliff and they come to the town of the Mini-Munchkins, who built the original Silver Bridge before it was destroyed by the Wicked Witch of the East. The bridge the group saw was just an illusion caused by the Mini-Munchkins' sadness and doubt. Wimzik inspires them to believe in themselves and not to give up, somehow breaking the Witch's spell over them and restoring the bridge.

Caroline's battery runs out just as the Witch returns and casts Caroline's unconscious body into a whirlpool. Lion and Wimzik save her. Wimzik's touch gives Lion extra strength and recharges Caroline.

Next, the group meets the Seamstress, an elderly enchantress who turns Silly and Caroline into quilt patches. Realizing the Seamstress is under the Witch's spell, Wimzik calmly talks her into remembering who she really is. The Seamstress gives them a petal she says came from the Flower of Oz. Lion gets a whiff and tracks it to a large garden encased in ice. When Wimzik touches the flower, the garden is instantly thawed and Lion realizes that the 'Flower Of Oz' is really Wimzik herself.

The Witch and Gloom show up. Fitzgerald, having stowayed, reveals the Witch's deceit. A fight ensures. Lion takes the Witch's blast for Wimzik, nearly dying. But Wimzik sits on her throne, regaining her powers. Enraged, the Witch spitefully steals Lion's Badge of Courage and throws it to Gloom who destroys it. Wimzik defeats the Witch and destroys Gloom. Beaten, the Witch swears vengeance before vanishing.

Lion is sad to have lost his badge, but Wimzik explains his courage does not come from a badge, but from his brave and noble heart. Lion bids his friends goodbye as he must go find Oscar, but promises to come back someday.

The film ends with Lion meeting Dorothy Gale, the Scarecrow, the Tin Man, and Toto, therefore stepping out of his own story and into "The Wonderful Wizard of Oz".

== Cast ==
- Henry Beckman as Narrator
- Dom DeLuise as Oscar Diggs
- Gerard Plunkett as The Oak Tree
- Jason Priestley as Lion
- Lynn Redgrave as Wicked Witch of the East
- Miklos Perlus as Sunbeam
- Eleanor Noble as Moonbeam
- Elizabeth Robertson as Starburst
- Scott McNeil as Gloom
- Bobcat Goldthwait as Silly Oz-Bul
- Jane Horrocks as Wimzik
- Tim Curry as Captain Fitzgerald
- Kathy Griffin as Caroline
- Peter Kelamis as Tog
- Don Brown as Pin Cushion
- Maxine Miller as Seamstress

== Home media ==
The film was released in the United States on DVD in 2000 by Sony Wonder with special features on the disc including Sing Alongs, Music Videos (which were straight from the movie), Games, Interviews with Behind the Scenes and a Gallery.

The film was released on DVD in the United Kingdom by VCI's budget arm Cinema Club in 2002. The DVD contains no extras except for a scene selection on the DVD menu.

== Reception ==
Common Sense Media stated, "Although this movie doesn't include enough music for it to be considered a musical, the characters sing a few times. The only concern for parents here is cartoon scariness, as the villainous Wicked Witch of the East, her flying monkeys, and her partner in crime -- a skull-faced mist creature called Gloom -- threaten Lion and the friends who're trying to help him. However, any child who's comfortable with the level of scariness in the 1939 classic film can handle Lion of Oz." FilmDienst also noted the prominence of songs in the film. "In this animated prequel to The Wizard of Oz, based on a book by L. Frank Baum's great grandson, Roger S. Baum, a circus lion and the circus balloonist, Oscar, are blown from Nebraska into Oz. ... The action is punctuated by several nicely melodic and message-laden songs. The story follows in the Oz books tradition of successive episodes introducing new and fantastic characters. Some of these minor characters, particularly Fitzy, the toy soldier prone to malapropisms, and Caroline, the doll with a sharp tongue and a warm heart, are delightful and help keep the video from becoming cloying. Technically this video is beautifully made and it boasts a fine cast of actor voices including Dom DeLuise as Oscar, Jane Horrocks as Wimsik, Jason Priestly as the Lion, and Lynne Redgrave as the Wicked Witch.", commented the School Library Journal.

The website of the RTP called Lion of Oz a "delicious animation film for the little ones ...and grown-ups" while TV Guide found it was a "charming animated prequel". The German website Cinema.de gave the film 5 stars out of 5.
