= Daniel St. Pierre =

American filmmaker

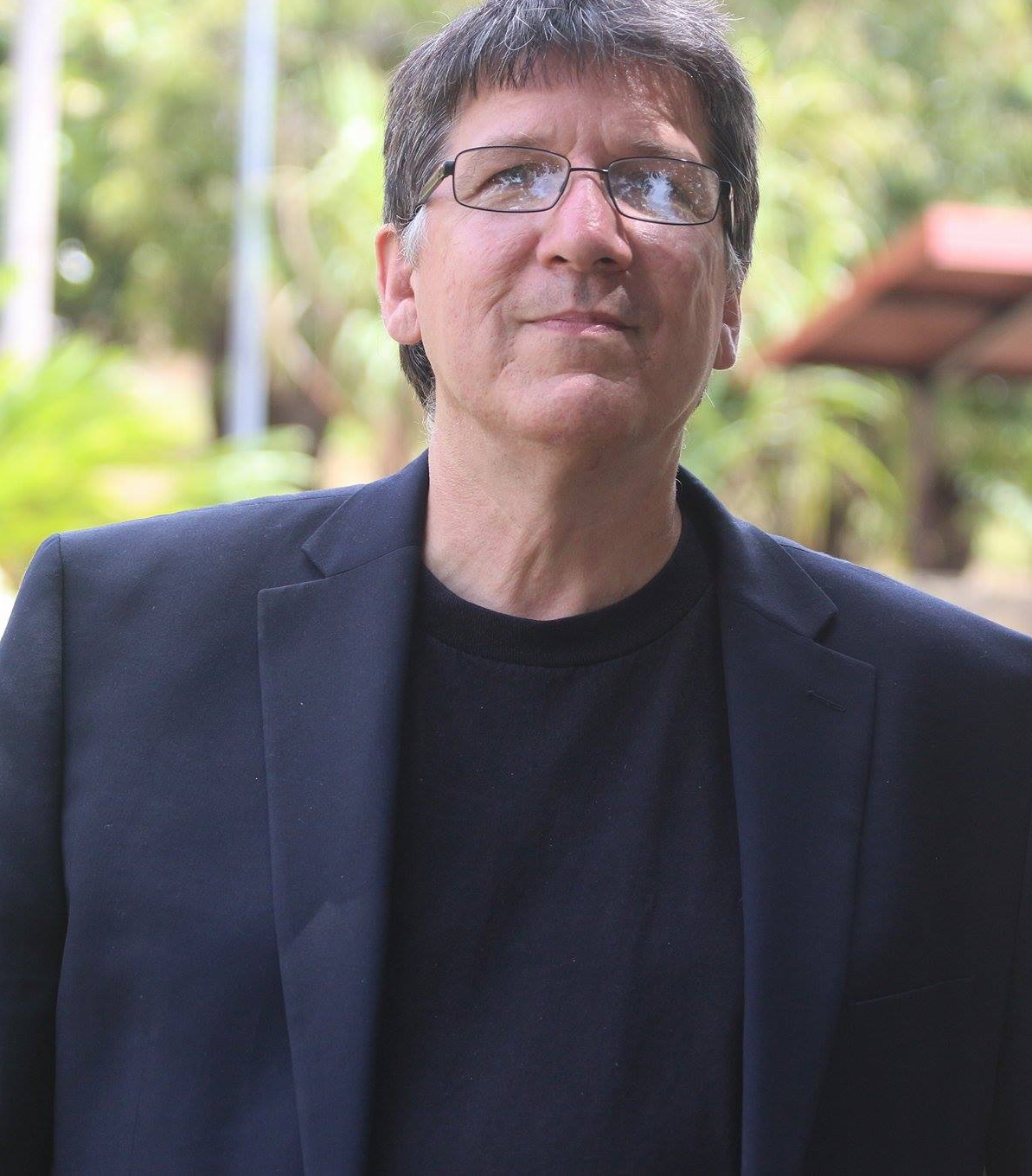
- Daniel St. Pierre in 2016
- Born: Newark, New Jersey, U.S.
- Known for: Film director, art director, production designer, voice actor, animator, musician

Daniel St. Pierre is an American film director, art director, production designer, voice actor, animator, and musician. For his work in bringing the Deep Canvas technique to the Disney film Tarzan (1999), he received a 1999 Annie Award nomination for Outstanding Individual Achievement for Production Design in an Animated Feature Production.

== Career ==
St. Pierre has been heavily involved in television and feature animation since 1983, making contributions to He-Man and the Masters of the Universe, Heathcliff & the Catillac Cats, Fat Albert and the Cosby Kids, He-Man and She-Ra, Filmation's Ghostbusters, BraveStarr, and Potsworth & Co.

In 1989 he joined Walt Disney Feature Animation. His first films there included The Little Mermaid, The Prince and the Pauper, Beauty and the Beast, and Aladdin. Later works include The Lion King (1994), The Hunchback of Notre Dame (1996), and Shark Tale (2004) His directorial projects include Everyone's Hero (2006) a film by the late Christopher Reeve that was completed by St. Pierre and Colin Brady, Quantum Quest: A Cassini Space Odyssey (2009), and Legends of Oz: Dorothy's Return (2014).

While working on Tarzan (1999), he and his team at Disney developed a patented process called Deep Canvas that allowed them to animate 3-D backgrounds before animating the characters, thus enhancing the apparent depth of backgrounds. For this he received a 1999 Annie Award nomination for "Outstanding Individual Achievement for Production Design in an Animated Feature Production". While with Disney, he also animated a series of Christian themed films for Nest Family Entertainment, including Abraham and Isaac, Moses, and Elijah.

== Filmography ==
Director
Legends of Oz: Dorothy's Return (2014)
Quantum Quest: A Cassini Space Odyssey (2009)
Sheepish (2008)
Everyone's Hero (2006)
Art director
Tarzan (1999)
Production Designer
Shark Tale
Layout
One by One (2004)
The Hunchback of Notre Dame (1996)
The Swan Princess (1994)
The Lion King (1994)
Aladdin (1992)
Beauty and the Beast (1991)
The Prince and the Pauper (1990)
The Little Mermaid (1989)
Actor
A Fishified World (2005)
Animator
The Swan Princess: Princess Tomorrow, Pirate Today (2016)
Once Not Far from Home (2006)
The Family Plan (2005)
Shark Tale (2004)
All Hands on Deck (2003)
Love Thy Neighbor (2003)
102 Dalmatians (2000)
The King and I (1999)
Elijah (1993)
Moses (1993)
Abraham and Isaac (1992)
The Kingdom of Heaven (1991)
Midnight Patrol: Adventures in the Dream Zone (1990)
Pound Puppies and the Legend of Big Paw (1988)
BraveStarr (1987–1988)
Filmation's Ghostbusters (1986)
She-Ra: Princess of Power (1985–1987)
Jem (1985)
The Secret of the Sword (1985)
He-Man and She-Ra: A Christmas Special (1985)
Fat Albert and the Cosby Kids (1984)
Heathcliff & the Catillac Cats (1984)
He-Man and the Masters of the Universe (1983–1984)
Miscellaneous Crew
9 (2009)
All Hands on Deck (2004)
Love Thy Neighbor (2003)

== Additional sources ==
- Hollywood.com, Daniel St. Pierre filmography
- Daniel St. Pierre as director for Everyone's Hero
- Star Pulse, Daniel St. Pierre filmography
