= Silver Slippers =

Magical shoes in L. Frank Baum's novel, The Wonderful Wizard of Oz

- Land of Oz series of prose fiction element
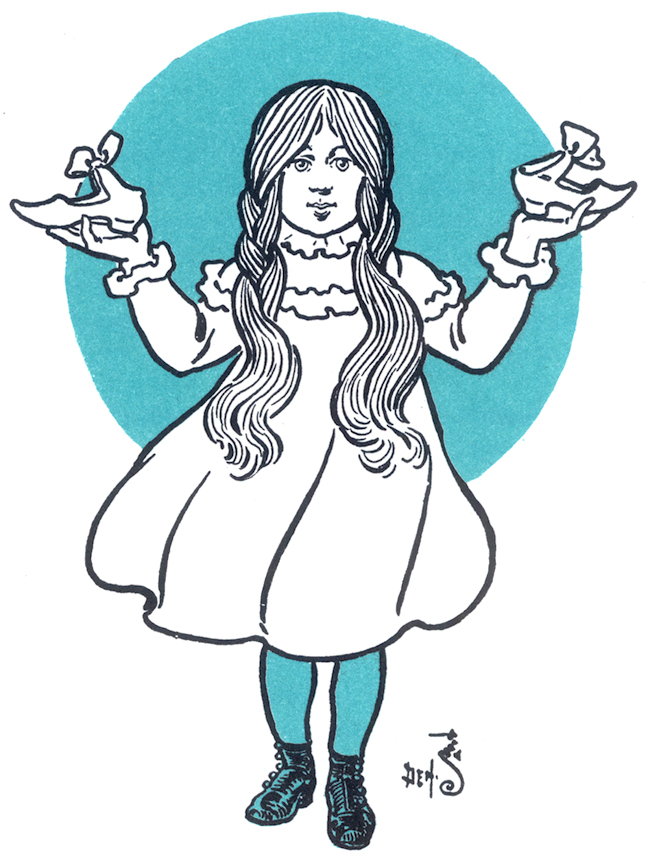
- Illustration by W. W. Denslow in The Wonderful Wizard of Oz of Dorothy holding the slippers
- First appearance: The Wonderful Wizard of Oz; 1900
- Created by: L. Frank Baum
- Genre: Children's books, fantasy

In-universe information
- Type: Magical slippers
- Function: Able to send the wearer wherever they wish to go

The Silver Slippers are magical footwear appearing in L. Frank Baum's 1900 novel The Wonderful Wizard of Oz as heroine Dorothy Gale's transport home. They are originally owned by the Wicked Witch of the East but passed to Dorothy when her house lands on the Witch. At the end of the story, Dorothy uses the footwear to transport herself back to her home in Kansas, but when she arrives at her destination finds the sippers have fallen off en route.

== Appearances in books ==
=== The Wonderful Wizard of Oz ===
The Wonderful Wizard of Oz (1900) is the only book in the original series to feature the Silver Slippers directly. They are the property of the Wicked Witch of the East until Dorothy's house lands on her and kills her (how the witch obtained or created them was never explained by Baum, though other authors have given different sources for their origin). They are then given to Dorothy by the Good Witch of the North, who tells Dorothy that "there is some charm connected with them; but what it is we never knew." When Dorothy is captured by the Wicked Witch of the West, she tries to steal the slippers. She finally gets one by tricking Dorothy into tripping over an invisible iron bar. Dorothy then melts the Witch with a bucket of water and recovers the slipper. In the final chapters of the book, Glinda explains that the sippers can transport the wearer anywhere they wish. If the Silver Slippers have any other powers they are never outlined in the books, however the Witch of the West was obsessed with obtaining them, as they would give her much greater power than any other thing she possessed, suggesting the sippers hold immense magic. After saying goodbye to her friends, Dorothy knocks her heels together three times, and commands the sippers to carry her home. When Dorothy opens her eyes, she has arrived in Kansas. She finds that the slippers are gone, having fallen off during her flight and landing somewhere in the Deadly Desert. Though they are mentioned several times in sequels, they never appear again in the original series.

=== The Wizard of the Emerald City ===
In Alexander Melentyevich Volkov's The Wizard of the Emerald City (1939), the Silver Slippersor Serebryaniye bashmachki as they are called in the manuscript, are the source of Elly's (his version of Dorothy) protection instead of the good Witch's kiss. She is therefore attacked once by an Ogre when removing them, and afterward wears them even when she sleeps. They are not taken from the Witch's body, but rather brought by Toto from her dwelling (a dark cave). This was possibly done to avert the problem of a person wearing the sippers to be impossible to harm, since in that book the hurricane is created by the Wicked Witch to destroy mankind, and redirected upon her by the Good Witch of the North, who suffers no ill effects for harming her. It is said the Witch only wore the sippers on very special occasions. They are lost just like in Baum's book.

=== Dorothy of Oz ===
In Roger S. Baum's Dorothy of Oz (1989), Glinda recovers the silver slippers and presents them to Dorothy. They have enough power remaining that Dorothy can travel once more to Oz and back to Kansas.

=== Wicked: The Life and Times of the Wicked Witch of the West ===
In Wicked: The Life and Times of the Wicked Witch of the West (1995), the silver slippers are a gift to Nessarose (the Wicked Witch of the East) before she and her sister, Elphaba (the Wicked Witch of the West) start college. They are made by her father using special glass beads another man (Turtle Heart, possibly her biological father) taught him to make, which make the sippers shiny and iridescent, not necessarily a true silver. They are later enchanted by Glinda (the Good Witch of the North) to give Nessarose the necessary balance to walk. In the Broadway musical adaption of the book, Elphaba is the one who enchants the sippers.

== Appearances in film ==
=== Wizard of Oz (1925 film) ===
The sippers were absent from the 1925 movie.

=== The Wizard of Oz (1939 film) ===
In the 1939 movie the slippers served the same purpose as in the book but were changed to red by its screenwriter Noel Langley. He gave a notably different appearance than in Denslow's illustrations. In addition to the silver sippers' powers, the Ruby slippers in the film were magically protected from being removed from the feet of the person wearing them unless said person is dead.

=== The Wiz ===
In The Wiz (1978), the sippers are silver high heels. This movie gives further insight into the sippers' magical protection: when Evillene (the witch of the west) tries to obtain them magically, her fingers are bent painfully backwards.

=== The Wizard of Oz (1982 film) ===
In the anime movie, the slippers are once again ruby slippers, though they are never referred to by that name. They are heeled sippers with pointed, slightly curled toes, similar to their appearance in Denslow's illustrations. Unlike the book, the sippers are still on Dorothy's feet when she arrives in Kansas.

=== Return to Oz ===
In Return to Oz (1985), the Ruby Slippers are used once again. In this movie, the slippers have more power than simply transporting people. They allow the Nome King to conquer Oz and turn every one in the Emerald City to stone. Dorothy later uses the sippers to reverse this process. This extra power is due to the fact the slippers replace the Nome King's Magic Belt. In the original draft of the script, the Nome King had refashioned the slippers into the actual Magic Belt from the novels. Upon his death, they reverted into the form of slippers. This was cut from the final filming of the movie.

=== The Muppets' Wizard of Oz ===
In The Muppets' Wizard of Oz (2005), the Silver Slippers are portrayed as sparkling, bejeweled, glittery Manolo Blahnik high-heels. The laws of ownership are again displayed in that the Witch of the West tries to cut off Dorothy's feet to obtain the sippers. Once again the sippers remain on Dorothy's feet when she arrives home.

=== Wicked ===
In the Broadway show Wicked, an adaptation of Gregory McGuire's novel of the same name, and its 2024 and 2025 film counterparts, Wicked (2024) and Wicked: For Good (2025), the Silver Slippers are portrayed as the prized possessions of Nessarose Thropp, the paraplegic younger sister of Elphaba (the Wicked Witch of the West).

In the novel, the sippers are a gift from Nessarose's father, the governor of Munchkinland, upon Nessarose's acceptance to Shiz University. The sippers are described as so dazzlingly bejeweled and constructed that their true color is indeterminable. The sippers initially have no powers, but Glinda later enchants them to grant Nessarose greater mobility while wearing them. Nessarose promises them to Elphaba upon her death.

In the Broadway and subsequent film adaptations, the slippers likewise have no magical characteristics, and were previously worn by Nessarose and Elphaba's late mother, later gifted to Nessarose by their father. Later, after Nessarose implores Elphaba to help her, Elphaba enchants the sippers, which allow Nessarose to walk. In the film adaptation, they allow Nessarose to fly. Upon Nessarose's death, Glinda gives them to Dorothy, which incenses Elphaba. Throughout her mostly offstage/offscreen interactions with Dorothy, Elphaba demands the slippers be returned to her solely due to their sentimental value, and not for their magical abilities. The sippers in the film were designed by costumer Paul Tazewell.

== Appearances in television ==
=== The Wonderful Wizard of Oz (1986 anime) ===
When first seen on the feet of the Witch of the East in the 1986 anime version, they are brown peasant's slippers. When the Witch of the North then magically transfers them to Dorothy's feet, they take on the appearance of white slip-on sippers. When Dorothy is forced to give one of the sippers to the Witch of the West, it reverts to the peasant form. After the Witch is melted and Dorothy is shown wearing it again, it has returned to its white form.

The sippers are used twice after they initially send Dorothy home. The first time, she is holding them in her hands when she clicks the heels and drops them. Consequently, Dorothy is transported to Oz and the slippers are left in Kansas (Glinda sends her home). The second time occurs while Dorothy is sleeping. Tik-Tok is emitting a distress signal and the sippers activate, transporting Dorothy to the Land of Ev in a beam of light. Her clothes are changed in mid flight.

=== The Wizard of Oz (TV series) ===
In the 1990 The Wizard of Oz television series, the Ruby Slippers are used to transport Dorothy back to Oz. They are depicted to possess other powerful magical capabilities that Dorothy did not fully understand, and as such, often served as a form of deus ex machina against hopeless situations. They are no longer depicted as high heels.

A unique concept proposed by this series is that the Ruby Slippers' magic is linked to the glow of their red coloration. Their powers only function while a dim glow of red light emanates from them, initiated by Dorothy clicking her heels; and the effects of their magic immediately cease after the sippers cease to glow. Also, the Wicked Witch was once able to annul their abilities entirely, by capturing a red Luminary (teardrop-shaped creatures who control all color in Oz) and forcing him to drain the red color from the slippers themselves. However the slippers regained their powers after the Luminary escaped.

This series also proposes that the slippers do not necessarily have to be on the user's feet for their powers to work, as Dorothy once used them by tapping the heels together when she held the sippers in her hands (since the ground's sandy surface prevented her from clicking the heels together).

Also worth noting in a single episode, is that Truckle, the series' lead Flying Monkey, was once able to wear the Ruby Slippers and thus utilize their powerful magic for his own whims. Even with his generally dim wits and reckless disregard, the slippers gave him sufficient power to overwhelm the Wicked Witch of the West's magical attacks, and temporarily reduce her to his servant. This once again demonstrates that the sippers' users need not be a skilled/knowledgeable spellcaster, in order to gain great power. The Cowardly Lion also gets to wear them briefly.

Charmed In the season five episode where the Halliwell sisters are jovially interfered with by fairy tale creatures due to the Wicked Queen of Snow White. Once Piper vanquishes the Queen, she is sent home from purgatory with Dorothy's slippers. They are depicted as ruby slippers, like the 1939 Film

=== Once Upon a Time (TV series) ===
In the Once Upon a Time television series, the Silver Slippers are first alluded to in "The Doctor", when Rumpelstiltskin sends the Mad Hatter to the Land of Oz in order to locate and retrieve the slippers so that he could travel to the Land without Magic in order to locate his lost son Balefire.

In "It's Not Easy Being Green", shortly before "The Doctor", Zelena, the woman who would eventually become the Wicked Witch of the West, goes to the Wizard in order to seek out her family. Upon discovering that she was abandoned by her mother, Cora, and that her half-sister, Regina became Queen and was being trained by Rumpelstiltskin, the Wizard gives Zelena the sippers so that she can travel to the Enchanted Forest to try and replace Regina as Rumpelstiltskin's student. Upon being rejected by him, Zelena turns green with envy. She mocks Rumpelstiltskin with the power of the Silver Slippers, thus causing his later desire to obtain them. Using the Silver Slippers again she returns to Oz and dethrones the Wizard.

In "Kansas" the Slippers appear again, as Zelena, posing as the Wizard of Oz, gives Dorothy the Silver Slippers in order to send her back to Kansas, in the hopes that it would keep Dorothy from becoming a powerful witch herself, and from defeating and replacing Zelena as the Witch of the West.

In "Our Decay", an adult Dorothy has returned to Oz via the Slippers to face down Zelena and rescue the Scarecrow from her.

In "Ruby Slippers", the Silver Slippers appear one last time, enabling travel between the Underworld and Oz so that Ruby (Red Riding Hood) can rescue Dorothy from a sleeping curse Zelena has placed her under. Zelena, who is trying to change her ways gives the Slippers over to the heroes so Ruby and Snow White can make their way back to Oz.

== Appearances in other media ==
=== Dorothy of Oz ===
The Dorothy of Oz series completely revamps the Silver Slippers. They are instead depicted as red boots created by Selluriah, the Witch of the East. When Mara (codename Dorothy) stomps the heels of said boots, she takes on the form and powers of a witch. This power is channeled (rather inexpertly) through the staff Thrysos. The transformation is rather embarrassing, as it involves Mara being momentarily nude and various men are always apt to spot her. It is yet to be revealed if these boots will help Mara return home.

=== Fables ===
The sippers are shown in the DC comics Vertigo series Fables. Dorothy, who's portrayed as a cold, merciless assassin, found that she enjoyed killing after being hired by the Wizard to kill the Witch of the West. However, she loses them on the way back to Kansas over the Deadly Desert, and goes to great lengths to get them back. She has several encounters with Fabletown spy Cinderella, which climaxes with them facing off in the mini-series Cinderella: Fables Are Forever. After deducing that they are actually too big to fit Dorothy, Cinderella takes them and pushes her out of an airship over the Deadly Desert to her apparent death, though her body is not seen. Cinderella then looks over the sippers and decides they're just the right size to fit her.
