= Wicked Witch of the East =

- Oz character
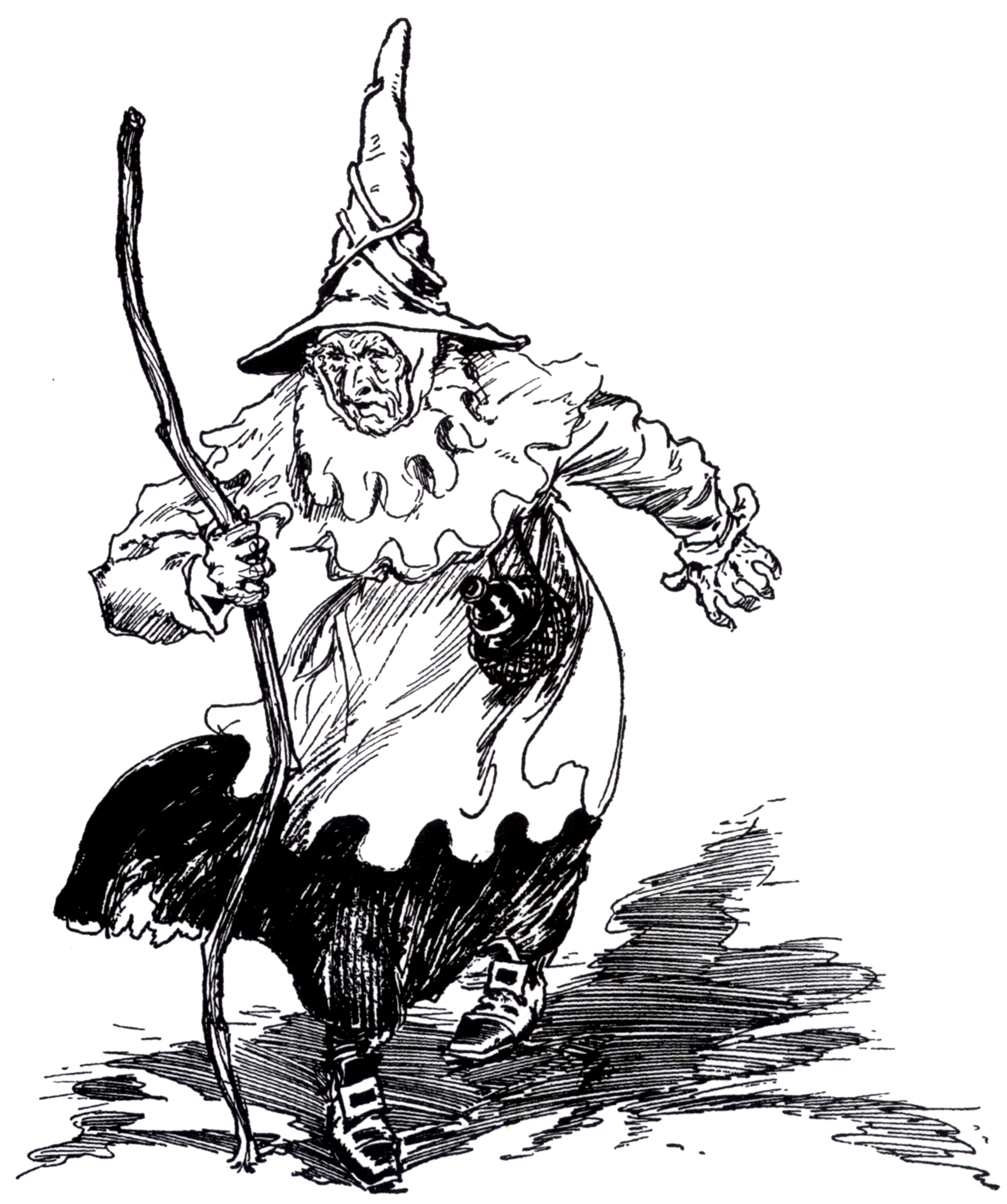
- The Wicked Witch of the East as pictured in The Tin Woodman of Oz—illustration by John R. Neill (1918)
- First appearance: The Wonderful Wizard of Oz (1900)
- Created by: L. Frank Baum
- Portrayed by: Michelle Federer (Wicked); Rachel Weisz (Oz the Great and Powerful); Florence Kasumba (Emerald City); Marissa Bode (Wicked and Wicked: For Good)

In-universe information
- Aliases: Gingema (1939) (The Wizard of the Emerald City); Evvamene (1974) (The Wiz); Rebecca Eastwitch (1992) (Oz Squad #2); Nessarose Thropp (1995) (Wicked); Old Sand-Eye (2000) (The Unknown Witches of Oz); Diana (2003) (MÄR); East (2006) (Witch Buster); Evanora (2013) (Oz the Great and Powerful); Zinna (2013) (Grimm Fairy Tales presents Oz #1); Witch of the East (2014) (Once Upon a Time); Mistress East (2017) (Emerald City); Cyra (2017) (Lost in Oz); Malvonia (2019) (How the Wizard Came to Oz)
- Species: Human (witch)
- Title: The Wicked Witch of the East
- Occupation: Ruler of the Munchkin Country (at time of death)
- Family: The Wicked Witch of the West (sister)
- Nationality: Ozian of Munchkin descent

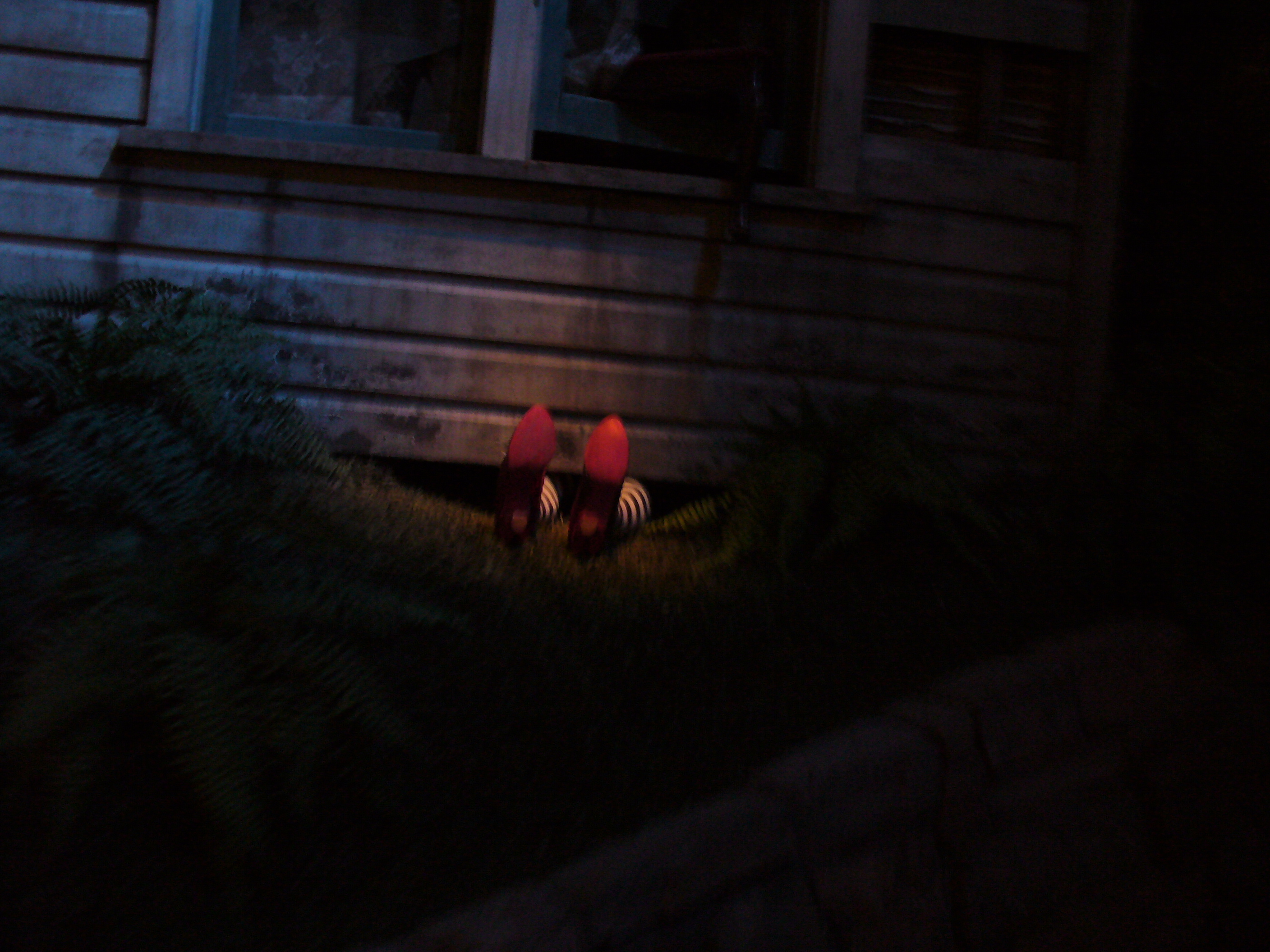
The extent of the Wicked Witch of the East seen in The Wizard of Oz as recreated in Disney's The Great Movie Ride

The Wicked Witch of the East is a fictional character created by American author L. Frank Baum. She is a crucial character but appears only briefly in Baum's classic children's series of Oz novels, most notably The Wonderful Wizard of Oz (1900).

The Wicked Witch was a middle-aged, malevolent woman who conquered and tyrannized the Munchkin Country in Oz's eastern quadrant, forcing the native Munchkins to slave for her night and day. Her charmed Silver Shoes (changed to ruby slippers in the 1939 film musical) held many mysterious powers and were her precious possession. The Witch is killed when Dorothy Gale's farmhouse lands on her at the start of the first book. Her body turns to dust, leaving behind the magical shoes to be passed to Dorothy.

== The classic Oz books ==
The Wicked Witch of the East was believed to be more powerful than the Good Witch of the North, but not as powerful as Glinda, the Good Witch of the South. She also appeared to be more powerful than Mombi, as the Good Witch of the North was able to defeat Mombi, but was powerless to overthrow the witch of the east and free the Munchkins.

She was not in any way related to the Wicked Witch of the West (as is made out to be in several adaptions) but was in league together with her, the Wicked Witch of the North, and the Wicked Witch of the South to conquer and divide Oz among themselves in four sections as recounted in Baum's fourth Oz book, Dorothy and the Wizard in Oz (1908). After the fall of Pastoria, the last mortal King of Oz, the old witch conquered the eastern section of Oz and held the native Munchkins in her bondage for a number of decades.

She had lived in a rather humble dwelling deep within the woods in a cottage located somewhere in Oz's eastern quadrant called Munchkin Country. She was bribed by an old woman who owned a beautiful Munchkin maid Nimmie Amee, who worked for her as a full-time servant, and happened to fall deeply in love with a local woodsman by the name of Nick Chopper. The woman gave her two sheep and a cow if the witch promised to prevent Nimmie Amee from marrying Nick and in leaving the old woman, the Wicked Witch of the East resolved to enchant Nick Chopper's ax. The curse cast upon it caused him to eventually turn into the Tin Woodman when he hacked all his own limbs off one by one, replacing the parts that were amputated with a hollow tin one, until he was all made of tin from his head to his feet. Once a man of tin with no human heart, Nick Chopper believed he no longer had the proper emotions that were required to love Nimmie Amee—much to the Wicked Witch's satisfaction. A year later, it was while the witch was out in the Munchkin meadows looking for herbs and spices to cast yet another one of her wicked spells, that Dorothy's falling farmhouse unexpectedly fell from the sky and accidentally crushed her to death after it was released by a cyclone from Kansas:

"Who was she?" asked Dorothy. "She was the Wicked Witch of the East, as I said," answered the little woman. "She has held all the Munchkins in bondage for many years, making them slave for her night and day. Now they are all set free, and are grateful to you for the favor."

She had helped certain Munchkins (such as Nimmie Amee's original mistress and the tinsmith Ku-Klip) with her witchcraft, under certain circumstances (usually at a reasonable cost). Among her exceedingly cruel actions was not just the enchantment of the woodman Nick Chopper's ax, but also Captain Fyter's sword, which caused him to turn into the Tin Soldier.

== Adaptations ==
In most adaptations and references to the Wicked Witch of the East, it is usually in her famous appearance, under a house, with only her feet exposed. Notable recent exceptions include the 2005 ABC television film The Muppets' Wizard of Oz and Disney's 2013 theatrical film Oz the Great and Powerful.

- The Wicked Witch of the East was featured in the film The Wizard of Oz (1939), in which she is the sister of the Wicked Witch of the West. As in the book, she is killed when Dorothy's house falls on her. The Wicked Witch of the West was not pleased with Dorothy for the death of her sister. Before the Wicked Witch of the West can claim the magic footwear, the Wicked Witch of the East's stockinged feet curl up into stumps with striped socks, and they disappear under the house and the shoes are transposed to Dorothy's feet. In the original book, the Wicked Witch of the West showed no emotion with regard to the death of her counterpart in the East, nor was she noted to be related to her in any way. She was only interested in the magic footwear (Silver Shoes in the book; Ruby slippers in the 1939 film).
- In Alexander Melentyevich Volkov's The Wizard of the Emerald City, The Witch's name is Gingema. Like in the 1939 movie, the two Wicked Witches are sisters. In Magic Land, she is summoning a magical hurricane to destroy all humanity. However, the Good Witch of the North learns of her schemes and changes the spell to only affect one house and drop it on Gingema's head. Unlike in Baum's books, while being the formal ruler of the Munchkins, she interfered little in their lives, and only demanded that people collect food for her. Since her food was snakes, leeches, spiders, and other similarly disgusting creatures that the Munchkins were afraid of, that was nevertheless a heavy burden for them. The name Gingema was also used for the Wicked Witch of the East in March Laumer's novel Aunt Em and Uncle Henry in Oz.
- In the 1974 Broadway musical The Wiz and its film version (1978), the Wicked Witch of the East is named Evvamene ("Ever mean") and terrorizes the Munchkins before Dorothy's adventure in Oz begins.
- In Mad Mad Mad Monsters, it was mentioned by the bellhop Norman to Count Dracula and Claude the Invisible Man that he heard a rumor that the Wicked Witch of the East would come out of the cake for the Monster's bachelor party at midnight. This actually happens at midnight as the Wicked Witch of the East (vocal effects provided by Rhoda Mann) emerges and flies around on her broomstick.
- In the 1995 novel Wicked: The Life and Times of the Wicked Witch of the West by Gregory Maguire, the Wicked Witch of the East is depicted as a beautiful and physically disabled young woman named Nessarose "Nessa" Thropp. She is the younger sister of Elphaba, the future Wicked Witch of the West. Nessa's disability was the result of her mother, Melena, taking a special medicine she acquired to ensure her second child would not be born with Elphaba's green skin. This instead caused Nessa to be born without arms, affecting her balance. The silver shoes, originally a gift from her father, were enchanted by Glinda to allow Nessa to walk without assistance.
  - In the novel's 2003 musical theatre adaptation, Melena instead chewed milkflowers at the insistence of Nessarose's father, who was disgusted by Elphaba's skin, only for the baby to come prematurely with her legs "all tangled" and permanently paralyzed. In the second act of the story, her shoes are instead enchanted by Elphaba.
  - Nessarose appears in the two-part film adaptation of the musical, Wicked (2024) and Wicked: For Good (2025), portrayed by Marissa Bode in her film debut and by Cesily Collette Taylor as a child. Instead of gaining the ability to walk, Elphaba enchants the shoes to allow Nessarose to fly instead. This was done to prevent the depiction of ableism, as Bode uses a wheelchair in real life.
- In the novel The Unknown Witches of Oz, the Wicked Witch of the East is named Old Sand-Eye.
- In Roger S. Baum's Lion of Oz and the Badge of Courage, the Wicked Witch of the East is the main antagonist. She forces the Cowardly Lion, who has just arrived in Oz, to search for the magical Flower Of Oz, which is the only thing preventing her from taking over Oz completely. She is once again the sister of the Wicked Witch of the West and becomes infuriated whenever she is (frequently) mistaken for her sister. She is depicted as a green-skinned hag with brown hair and a black cloak. However, she does not possess the silver shoes or ruby slippers, but she does control the Winged Monkeys. The book was adapted into the 2000 animated film Lion of Oz, where the Witch was voiced by Lynn Redgrave.
- In 2007, Turner Entertainment collaborated with Madame Alexander to create a series of McDonald's Happy Meal toys centered on the main characters from the 1939 movie, one of which was the Wicked Witch of the East. She is depicted as having blonde hair, a red shirt with a green belt and a burgundy dress over her distinguishable striped stockings and ruby slippers. She also is wearing a hat similar to the Witch of the West's, although it's colored red.
- In The Muppets' Wizard of Oz, the Wicked Witch of the East is played by Miss Piggy (as are all of the other witches). She manages to lift the house long enough to threaten the Munchkins before it falls back on top of her, killing her this time. Her silver shoes are then confiscated by the Good Witch of the North for Dorothy's use. Miss Piggy's other role is herself. Prior to Dorothy's journey, she appears with Kermit and tries to get rid of Dorothy. After Dorothy's return, she returns for the Muppets' show.
- The Wicked Witch of the East was featured in Dorothy and the Witches of Oz played by Sarah Lieving. Dressed in a red and black dress with a red pointed hat, her skin is less green than her sister's but with battle scars all over and her eyes are pitch black. Her magic item being a fire staff, she was in the middle of a battle between Glinda and the Good Witch of the North until Dorothy's house fell on her and her last word after seeing the house coming was (Oh Dear). The Wicked Witch of the West still blames Dorothy for her sister's death.
- The Witch is mentioned but not seen alive in a little-known British TV version of "The Wizard of OZ" from 1995 starring Denise van Outen, which has her obtaining the Ruby Slippers when they fell off the feet of a visitor from over the rainbow (Zöe Salmon in a quick appearance) when she wished herself home, which she then uses to rule over the Munchkins until Dorothy's arrival causes her untimely demise.

Rachel Weisz as Evanora in Oz the Great and Powerful

- In the 2013 Disney film Oz the Great and Powerful, the Wicked Witch of the East, named Evanora, is the main antagonist. She is portrayed by Rachel Weisz. In this version, the Witch is the older sister of Theodora, the Wicked Witch of the West (Mila Kunis), and is at war with Glinda, the Good Witch of the South (Michelle Williams) for control of Oz. She originally portrays herself as a Good Witch, and had been an adviser to the former king of Oz, whom she murdered, so that she could be in charge of the Emerald City herself. Evanora deceived Oscar Diggs by framing the King's daughter Glinda for the murder and telling him that Glinda is the Wicked Witch instead of herself, which resulted in Glinda being outlawed from the Emerald City and retreating to the South. Evanora manipulates her sister, who is in love with Oscar Diggs (James Franco), and ends up transforming Theodora into the Wicked Witch (of the West, eventually). Evanora is later fooled and scared by Oscar's illusion tricks and banished from the Emerald City. Before she flees, Evanora encounters Glinda in the throne room and the two witches fight each other in a climatic magic duel. Evanora seems to have an upper hand, but Glinda then crushes Evanora's emerald necklace, the source of her power, and the Wicked Witch's youthful and beautiful appearance quickly turns into that of a hideous old crone, which Glinda believes is a reflection of her true nature. Furious, Evanora tries to attack Glinda, but she is blasted out of the throne room window by Glinda wielding her magic wand. Evanora is then carried away by two of her last surviving flying baboons, but not before swearing a personal revenge on Glinda for foiling her. The emerald necklace that Evanora wears enables her to project her power from her very fingertips in a form that resembles green lightning. The magic shoes that the Witch would ultimately become associated with are not seen or even discussed in this film, nor does she officially become the Wicked Witch of the East during the story, which ends with the Wizard taking over the Emerald City. This is one of the significant differences from L. Frank Baum's original books, in which the Wicked Witches of the East and West were already ruling the Munchkin Country and the Winkie Country by the time the Wizard first arrived in Oz.
- In the comic book series Oz Squad, the Wicked Witch of the East is called Rebecca Eastwitch.
- In the comic book series Grimm Fairy Tales presents Oz, the Wicked Witch of the East is named Zinna.
- In the graphic novel adaptation of How the Wizard Came to Oz, the Wicked Witch of the East is named Malvonia.
- In the TV series Once Upon a Time, there is a Witch of the East (portrayed by Sharon Taylor), but she is not evil and Dorothy's house does not fall on her. The Witches in this series are a benign sisterhood who watch over Oz, but they are eventually overthrown by Zelena, the Wicked Witch of the West (portrayed by Rebecca Mader) who was unable to control her jealousy of Dorothy. In this version, the sister of the Wicked Witch of the West is the Evil Queen from the story of Snow White.
- In the Amazon Prime Video 2015 animated series, Lost in Oz, the Witch of the East is named Cyra, the older sister of Langwidere, and mother of West. This version of the character does not share almost anything in common with the original Witch of the East, who turns out to be her great-great-aunt, as she is portrayed as kind and good-hearted, but also overprotective of her daughter because of Langwidere who turns to be a Wicked Witch and tyrant.
- In the TV series Emerald City, the Witch of the East (portrayed by Florence Kasumba) appears as a guest star. In this version, she was one of the last cardinal witches of Oz, known as the Witch of the East "the Mistress of the Eastern Wood, the Most Merciful and Stern". When Dorothy (Adria Arjona) arrives in Oz, she initially believes that she has killed the Witch of the East when the police car she was in during the initial tornado hit the Witch, but it is later revealed that the Witch survived this incident. She goes on to confront Dorothy and her new companion Lucas, refusing to accept Dorothy's explanation that her appearance was an accident. Faced with the prospect of torture until she gives the Witch the answer she wants despite the fact that she is already telling the truth, Dorothy uses the Witch's current examination of a gun taken from the police car to trick her into pointing the gun at herself and pulling the trigger, blowing a hole through her head. After the witch's death, Dorothy inherits her ruby-encrusted golden gloves, which give her potential access to the Witch's raw magical power even if she lacks control of it. The season finale states that only witches can kill witches, as the Wizard creates new guns to kill the remaining lower-ranking witches and they simply come back to life, but it appears likely that the Witch of the East remains dead as she technically killed herself.
- The Wicked Witch of the East appears in Escape from Mr. Lemoncello's Library voiced by Breanna Watkins.
