= Legends of Oz: Dorothy's Return =

2013 film by Daniel St. Pierre

- Theatrical release poster
- Directed by: Daniel St. Pierre; Will Finn
- Written by: Adam Balsam; Randi Barnes
- Based on: Dorothy of Oz by Roger Stanton Baum
- Produced by: Roland Carroll; Ryan Carroll; Bonne Radford
- Starring: Lea Michele; Patrick Stewart; Jim Belushi; Dan Aykroyd; Kelsey Grammer; Megan Hilty; Hugh Dancy; Oliver Platt; Bernadette Peters; Martin Short
- Edited by: Dan Molina; Stan Webb
- Music by: Toby Chu
- Production companies: Prana Studios; Summertime Entertainment
- Distributed by: Clarius Entertainment
- Release dates: June 14, 2013 (AIAFF); May 9, 2014 (United States)
- Running time: 88 minutes
- Country: United States
- Language: English
- Budget: $70 million
- Box office: $21.7 million

Legends of Oz: Dorothy's Return is a 2013 American animated musical fantasy film that is loosely based on the 1989 book Dorothy of Oz by L. Frank Baum's great-grandson Roger Stanton Baum. Directed by Daniel St. Pierre and Will Finn, the film features the voices of Lea Michele, Dan Aykroyd, Jim Belushi, Kelsey Grammer, Oliver Platt, Megan Hilty, Hugh Dancy, Patrick Stewart, and Martin Short.

The film premiered at the Annecy International Animated Film Festival in France on June 14, 2013 and was released in the United States and Canada on May 9, 2014. The film was largely panned by both critics and audiences and was considered by analysts to be a colossal box-office bomb, grossing $21.7 million worldwide against a budget of $70 million.

It is the only film produced by Summertime Entertainment as the company was shut down in response to the film's commercial underperformance.

== Plot ==
Inside the Emerald City, the Scarecrow, the Tin Woodman, and the Cowardly Lion, now the city's co-leaders, discover that the Wicked Witch of the West's broomstick has been stolen. With the Land of Oz's future imperiled, the Scarecrow decides to activate his invention, the Rainbow Mover, to contact Dorothy Gale. Meanwhile, back in Kansas, she awakens to discover that a different tornado has wrecked her family's farm, leaving it in disrepair. A man posing as a government appraiser condemns the farmhouse and evicts her family. After a few failed attempts to repair her farm, Dorothy discovers her fellow townspeople have been similarly notified. Noticing a rainbow approaching her, she attempts to escape from it, but it ultimately absorbs her and Toto. Holographically, the trio reappear before Dorothy, and the Scarecrow attempts to explain what is happening. Before he can finish, Winged monkeys break into the Wizard of Oz's chamber, causing the trio to flee. The rainbow deposits Dorothy and Toto in Oz, albeit far from the Emerald City.

Dorothy first befriends Wiser, an overweight and intelligent but flightless owl. The pair enters Candy Country, where everything is made out of candy, including the inhabitants. Due to the manipulated signs, Marshal Mallow promptly arrests the duo for breaking the "no eating anything made of candy" rule and brings them to court. Upon recognizing Dorothy, Judge Jawbreaker exonerates and releases her and Wiser. Mallow joins the group, thus turning it into a trio, to fulfill a promise he made to find the missing General Candy Apple. Meanwhile, Glinda confronts the Jester, who has constructed a magic scepter from his sister's broomstick and crystal ball to turn the leaders of the territories of Oz, including General Candy Apple, into subservient marionettes. Glinda is similarly victimized, giving him complete control of Oz.

Entering the Dainty China Country, the trio is informed that they are restricted from passing through her kingdom. Inside her castle, the China Princess rejects potential suitors, but Mallow poses as a suitor and enchants her with his singing. After the Jester damages the land by causing an earthquake, the Princess angrily blames Dorothy for the Jester's torment, but agrees to accompany Dorothy and her traveling group, thus granting them passage through the land. Finding a bridge to the Emerald City destroyed, the group decides to construct a boat, but all the talking trees in the nearby forest decline except for an 978-year-old tree named Tugg, who agrees to be carved into a galleon. Dorothy's group sails into the abandoned Emerald City, but upon an ambush by the Flying Monkeys, the unit escapes into a cave system but tumbles down a waterfall and is separated.

Shattered by the fall and presumed dead, the China Princess is mourned by Mallow, who then surprisingly discovers she is still alive and repairs her. Dorothy and Toto confront the Jester at his palace, who threatens to kill her if she refuses to return to Kansas via the Rainbow Mover; Toto rescues her by dropping a curtain on the Jester's head, with the lead Flying Monkey stealing the Jester's staff to regrow its previously-shrunken wings. As the Jester pursues him, Dorothy reunites with the captured trio, and they confront the Jester on the rooftop. Dorothy falls off the roof in the ensuing struggle for the staff, but Wiser arrives and catches her, having mustered his confidence and strength.

The rest of Dorothy's traveling companions arrive with Tugg built on wheels and engage the Flying Monkeys in combat. The Jester summons a tornado to overpower her, but Dorothy's own magic breaks the spell damaging Oz, freeing its leaders. The tornado nearly sucks the Jester in, but Dorothy rescues him. However, once she casts the staff into the tornado, the Jester jumps in after it and vanishes. Glinda appears, thanks Dorothy and sends both her and Toto back to Earth. Reuniting with Aunt Em and Uncle Henry, Dorothy rallies the townsfolk and exposes the appraiser as a con artist who has been using multiple fake licenses to commit crimes. He is arrested by the sheriff while his lackey escapes, and Dorothy and her fellow townspeople proceed to rebuild their homes.

== Voice cast ==
- Lea Michele as Dorothy Gale
- Dan Aykroyd as Scarecrow
- Jim Belushi as Lion
- Kelsey Grammer as Tin Woodman
- Martin Short as Jester, Appraiser
- Hugh Dancy as Marshal Mallow
- Megan Hilty as China Princess, Mouse Queen
- Oliver Platt as Wiser
- Patrick Stewart as Tugg/Tank
- Bernadette Peters as Glinda
- Tacey Adams as Aunt Em
- Michael Krawic as Uncle Henry
- Randi Soyland as You, China Handmaiden
- Brian Blessed as Judge Jawbreaker
- Douglas Hodge as Fruit Stripe Lawyer
- Debi Derryberry as Lollipop Stenographer
- Randy Crenshaw as China Guard, Kansas Sheriff
- Randal Keith as First Minister, Winkie Suitor
- Richard Horvitz as Munchkin Suitor
- Tom Kenny as China Suitor
- Leonard Dozier as Multiple Voices

Flying Monkey's vocal effects provided by Scott Menville, Alan Shearman, Randi Soyland, and Flip Waterman.

== Production ==
When the Carroll brothers began raising money for the film in 2006, they were running a company called Alpine Pictures, which had previously made several low budget films. The Carrolls had a history of fundraising activities dating back to at least 1993, when they were sent a cease-and-desist letter by the state of Oregon accusing of them of selling unregistered securities. The next decade they received cease-and-desist orders and fines in states such as California, Wisconsin, Utah, Michigan, and Illinois. On the December 2, 2013 edition of the SpaceCast podcast, executive producer Greg Centineo confirmed that the film would be a musical and would feature music composed by Bryan Adams who also had a small voice role as a beaver foreman.

According to an investigation by TheWrap, a total of six states in the United States individually sent cease-and-desist letters to the Carroll brothers as they were fundraising for the film, accusing them of violating financial laws. It was reported by TheWrap that potential investors for the film had been told that the film would gross anywhere from $720 million to $2.04 billion U.S. dollars.

== Soundtrack ==
The Legends of Oz: Dorothy Returns (Original Motion Picture Soundtrack) was released on May 6, 2014 by Columbia Records, a division of Sony Music Entertainment.

| No. | Title | Writer(s) | Performer(s) | Length |
|---|---|---|---|---|
| 1. | "When the World" | Tift Merritt | Lea Michele | 4:06 |
| 2. | "Candy, Candy" | Bryan Adams & Jim Vallance | Martin Short | 2:25 |
| 3. | "China Princess" | Jim Dooley | Megan Hilty | 3:56 |
| 4. | "Jester" | Jim Dooley | Martin Short | 2:26 |
| 5. | "Work with Me" | Bryan Adams & Jim Vallance | Lea Michele & Chorus | 2:40 |
| 6. | "Even Then" | Tift Merritt | Hugh Dancy, Lea Michele & Megan Hilty | 2:43 |
| 7. | "When the World Finale" | Tift Merritt | Lea Michele | 3:52 |
| 8. | "One Day" | Bryan Adams & Jim Vallance | Lea Michele | 3:21 |
| 9. | "Overture" | Toby Chu | Hollywood Symphony Orchestra | 3:07 |
| 10. | "Under the Jester's Spell" | Toby Chu | Hollywood Symphony Orchestra | 4:21 |
| 11. | "The Spell is Broken" | Toby Chu | Hollywood Symphony Orchestra | 4:27 |
| 12. | "Escape from Emerald City" | Toby Chu | Hollywood Symphony Orchestra | 4:25 |
| 13. | "Dorothy Wakes" | Toby Chu | Hollywood Symphony Orchestra | 3:52 |

== Reception ==
On the review aggregator website Rotten Tomatoes, 17% of 60 critics' reviews are positive, with an average rating of 3.6/10. The website's consensus reads: "Faced with the choice between staying in or seeing Legends of Oz: Dorothy's Return, most filmgoers will be forced to conclude that there's no place like home." Metacritic, which uses a weighted average, assigned the film a score of 25 out of 100, based on 22 critics, indicating "generally unfavorable" reviews. CinemaScore gave the film an "A" on an A+ to F scale, based on polls conducted during the opening weekend.

=== Box office ===
The film made $1 million on its opening day in the United States, and $3.7 million in its first weekend, against an estimated $70 million budget. By the end of its run, the film grossed $8.5 million in North America and $13.2 million internationally for a worldwide total of $21.7 million.

=== Accolades ===
At the 35th Golden Raspberry Awards, Kelsey Grammer won the award for Worst Supporting Actor for voicing the Tin Man in the film as well as for his live-action roles in The Expendables 3, Think Like a Man Too and Transformers: Age of Extinction. This is the second animated film to win a Razzie; previously, Thumbelina won the since-retired award for Worst Original Song in 1995 for "Marry the Mole".

The film also received a nomination with Daniel St. Pierre for Best Feature Cristal Award at the Annecy International Animated Film Festival.

== Home media ==
Legends of Oz: Dorothy's Return was released on DVD and Blu-ray by 20th Century Fox Home Entertainment on August 26, 2014.

== Cancelled franchise ==
Despite the film's underperformance at the box office, two sequels and a television series were said to be in the works, though the plan was that the sequels would likely go directly to DVD if the film did not perform well at the box office. As of 2026, no further developments regarding the sequels or the television series have been announced, and the websites for both Legends of Oz: Dorothy's Return and Summertime Entertainment have since been taken down; the only active web media to date is the LinkedIn page of Summertime Entertainment, as the company's Facebook page, which had not shared any new posts since promotion for the film's home media release on August 26, 2014, was reportedly closed down around 2025. This is widely believed to have been a scam.

== Lawsuit ==
On August 16, 2019, a civil case was heard in the U.S. District Court of California claiming that the Carrolls, and Greg Centineo, scammed at least 1,800 different investors in order to finance the movie. Per documents, they raised well over $122 million despite only using $70 million. Allegedly, some of the funds were used to promote the acting career of Centineo's son Noah.
