= Dorothy Gale =

Main protagonist in Oz novels

- Oz character
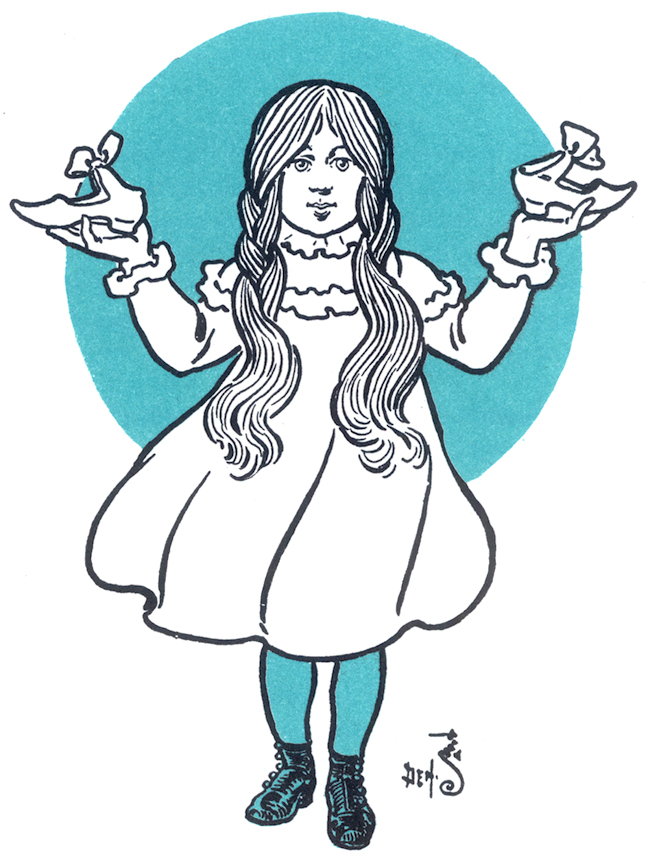
- Dorothy holding the shoes of the Wicked Witch of the East. (Illustration by W. W. Denslow)
- First appearance: The Wonderful Wizard of Oz (1900)
- Created by: L. Frank Baum

In-universe information
- Aliases: Ellie Smith (1939) (The Wizard of the Emerald City); Dorothy Gale / Kansas (2014-2016) (Once Upon a Time)
- Gender: Female
- Occupation: Adventurer; Royal princess Government liaison Farm girl
- Family: Aunt Em; Uncle Henry
- Relatives: Bill Hugson (distant uncle); Mrs. Hugson (distant aunt); Zeb of Hugson's ranch (distant cousin) unnamed Australians (related through Henry); Susan (indirect descendant); Em (niece of Susan); Dori (niece of Susan)
- Nationality: American; Ozite (later)

Dorothy Gale is a character created by the American author L. Frank Baum as the protagonist in many of his Oz novels. She first appears in Baum's classic 1900 children's novel The Wonderful Wizard of Oz and reappears in most of its sequels. She is also the main character in various adaptations, notably the 1939 film adaptation of the novel, The Wizard of Oz.

In later novels, the Land of Oz steadily becomes more familiar to her than her homeland of Kansas. Dorothy eventually goes to live in an apartment in the Emerald City's palace but only after her Aunt Em and Uncle Henry have settled in a farmhouse on its outskirts. Dorothy's best friend Princess Ozma, leader of Oz, officially makes her a princess of Oz later in the novels.

== Appearances ==
=== In literature ===
In the Oz books, Dorothy is raised by her aunt and uncle in the bleak landscape of a Kansas farm. Whether Aunt Em or Uncle Henry is Dorothy's blood relative remains unclear. Uncle Henry makes reference to Dorothy's mother in The Emerald City of Oz, possibly an indication that Henry is Dorothy's blood relative. (It is also possible that "Aunt" and "Uncle" are affectionate terms of a foster family and that Dorothy is not related to either of them, although Zeb in Dorothy and the Wizard in Oz claims to be Dorothy's second cousin, related through Aunt Em. Little mention is made of what happened to Dorothy's birth parents, other than a passing reference to her mother being dead.)

Along with her small black dog, Toto, Dorothy is swept away by a tornado to the Land of Oz and, much like Alice from Alice's Adventures in Wonderland, they enter an alternative world filled with talking creatures. In many of the Oz books, Dorothy is the heroine of the story. She is often seen with her best friend and the ruler of Oz, Princess Ozma. Her trademark blue and white gingham dress is admired by the Munchkins because blue is their favorite color and white is worn only by good witches and sorceresses, which indicates to them that Dorothy is a good witch.

Dorothy has several other pets, including her white/pink/purple kitten Eureka, and Billina, a feisty talking hen. Her cow, Imogene, appears in the 1902 stage version; while unnamed, this cow is implied in the 1910 film. Eric Shanower's novel, The Giant Garden of Oz, also features a cow named Imogene.

Dorothy's last name is never mentioned in The Wonderful Wizard of Oz or The Marvelous Land of Oz, the first two Oz books. It is disclosed in the third book, Ozma of Oz (1907). The last name of Gale was originally mentioned in Baum's script for the 1902 Broadway stage version of The Wizard of Oz, in which it was originally a setup for a punning joke. (Dorothy: "I am Dorothy, and I am one of the Kansas Gales." Scarecrow: "That accounts for your breezy manner.")

In the sixth Oz book by Baum, The Emerald City of Oz (1910), when Uncle Henry and Aunt Em are unable to pay the mortgage on the new farmhouse built at the end of The Wonderful Wizard of Oz, Dorothy brings them to live in Oz; the plot features a tour of Oz as a marvelous, utopian land in which they have escaped the troubles of Kansas. She becomes the princess of Oz.

Dorothy is an Oz celebrity, having at least a cameo role in thirteen of the fourteen Oz books written by L. Frank Baum; while she did not appear at all in The Marvelous Land of Oz, she is mentioned several times in that story. In the subsequent nineteen Oz books by Ruth Plumly Thompson, Dorothy gets at least a cameo in all except Captain Salt in Oz and The Silver Princess in Oz (in which neither Oz nor any of its inhabitants appear, though they are mentioned). Most of the other books focus on different child protagonists, some Ozites, some from other Nonestican realms, and some from the United States, and as such, her appearances in the main series become more and more limited. In Jack Snow's The Magical Mimics in Oz (1946), Ozma places Dorothy on the throne of Oz while she is away visiting Queen Lurline's fairy band.

The magic of Oz keeps Dorothy young. In The Lost King of Oz (1925), a Wish Way carries Dorothy to a film set in Hollywood, California. She begins to age very rapidly to her late 20s, making up for at least some of the years that have already passed. The Wish Way carries her back to Oz and restores her to her younger self, but she learns then that it would be unwise for her ever to return to the outside world. Baum never states Dorothy's age, but he does write in The Lost Princess of Oz that she is a year younger than Betsy Bobbin and a year older than Trot, whose age was specified as 10 in Ruth Plumly Thompson's The Giant Horse of Oz, putting her at age 11 by the time she comes to live in Oz.

Dorothy has a forthright and take-charge character, exhibiting no fear when she slaps the Cowardly Lion, and organizing the Winkies' rescue mission of her friends who have been dismembered by the winged monkeys. She is not afraid of angering the Wicked Witch of the West, as shown when the Witch stole one of Dorothy's slippers, and in retaliation, Dorothy hurled a bucket of water over her, not knowing water was fatal to the witch. She brazenly rebuffs Princess Langwidere's threat to take her head for her collection — "Well, I b'lieve you won't." (Following Anna Laughlin's portrayal of the character in the popular 1903 Broadway version of The Wizard of Oz, Baum scripts Dorothy to speak in childlike contractions with Ozma of Oz, which she continues to do throughout the series). This aspect of her character was somewhat lessened by her companionship of Ozma, in whom Baum placed the greater level of wisdom and dignity. Yet even this is complicated by her associations with her cousin, Zeb of Hugson's Ranch, a rugged, manly boy who does not take well to Oz and cannot think of anything much more interesting than defeating the Munchkins' wrestling champion, which he proves unable to do.

Thompson's Oz books show a certain intolerance in Dorothy. In The Cowardly Lion of Oz, circus clown Notta Bit More arrives in the Emerald City "disguised" as a traditional witch, and Dorothy immediately starts dumping buckets of water on him without provocation (although she reacted this way on the assumption that the "witch" Notta was an evil witch like her old enemy, the Wicked Witch of the West). In The Wishing Horse of Oz, she makes unsavory comments about the dark coloration Gloma and her subjects take on as a disguise, making them somewhat resemble black people. This behavior is not characteristic of Dorothy in Baum's Oz books. In The Patchwork Girl of Oz, she pushes and slaps through crowds of black Tottenhots to rescue the Scarecrow, whom they are tossing around, but this is more an example of her gumption than any sort of prejudice, as she is otherwise kind and polite to the Tottenhots, and accepts that their ways are different from those who dwell in the Emerald City.

The authorized sequels of Sherwood Smith, The Emerald Wand of Oz and Trouble Under Oz, center on the child characters Dori and Em, who live with their Aunt Susan. All three are indirect descendants of Dorothy, though their specific relationship to her is unclear.

Philip José Farmer's 1982 science-fiction novel A Barnstormer in Oz tells the story of aviator Henry "Hank" Stover — who is not surprised one beautiful spring day in 1923 when he flies his Curtiss Jenny biplane through a strange green cloud and finds himself in Oz. Hank knows that he is in Oz because his mother, Dorothy Gale-Stover, had been there back in 1890 and later told him of her experiences. Farmer's premise is that Dorothy only visited Oz once and told her story to a journalist named Frank Baum. This journalist would later create a series of books from Dorothy's only adventure in Oz. Farmer's Oz is on the brink of both a civil war and an invasion by the United States Army.

==== Conception ====
An influence on the creation of Dorothy appears to be the Alice books of Lewis Carroll. Although Baum reportedly found these plots incoherent, he identified their source of popularity as Alice herself, a character with whom child readers could identify; this influenced his choice of a protagonist for his own books.

Dorothy's character was probably named after Baum's own niece, Dorothy Louise Gage, who died in infancy. Baum's wife was very attached to her and was deeply grieved by her death, so there is speculation that Baum inserted her name into his stories as a memorial. Elements of Dorothy Gale's character are possibly derived from Matilda Joslyn Gage, Dorothy Gage's grandmother. Dorothy Gage is buried in Evergreen Cemetery in Bloomington, Illinois.

Lee Sandlin writes that L. Frank Baum read a disaster report of a tornado in Irving, Kansas, in May 1879 which included the name of a victim, Dorothy Gale, who was "found buried face down in a mud puddle."

=== Silent films ===
In Baum's 1902 stage musical adaptation, Dorothy was played by Anna Laughlin. In 1908 L. Frank Baum adapted his early Oz novels as The Fairylogue and Radio-Plays, with Romola Remus as Dorothy. This was followed by The Wonderful Wizard of Oz, a motion picture short that Otis Turner, one of the directors of Fairylogue, made without Baum as part of a contract fulfillment. In this 1910 film, Dorothy was played by Bebe Daniels. It was followed by two sequels (the same year), Dorothy and the Scarecrow in Oz and The Land of Oz, both of which included Dorothy, but whether Daniels participated is unknown. Baum subsequently loosely adapted The Wonderful Wizard of Oz into a 1914 motion picture directed by J. Farrell MacDonald titled His Majesty, the Scarecrow of Oz with Violet MacMillan as Dorothy.

Dorothy does not appear in The Patchwork Girl of Oz (1914), although some film books claim that Mildred Harris, who had yet to sign her contract with The Oz Film Manufacturing Company, played the role. The character, is, in fact, eliminated from the film version, although she has a fairly large role in the novel.

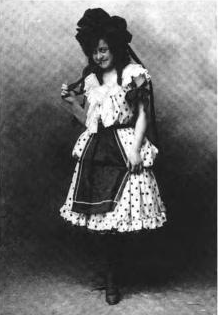
Anna Laughlin as Dorothy in the 1902 musical

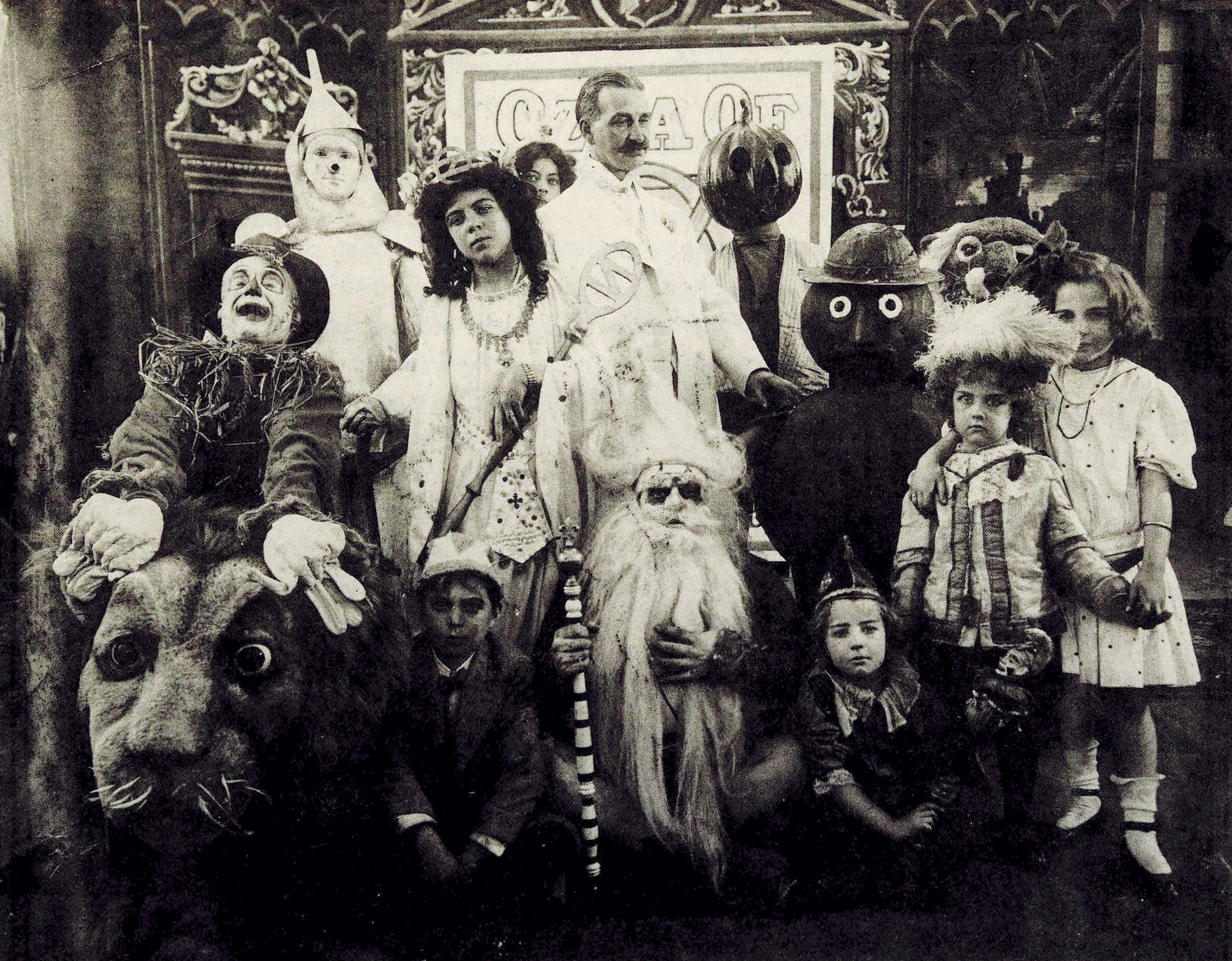
Romola Remus (far right) with the cast of The Fairylogue and Radio-Plays

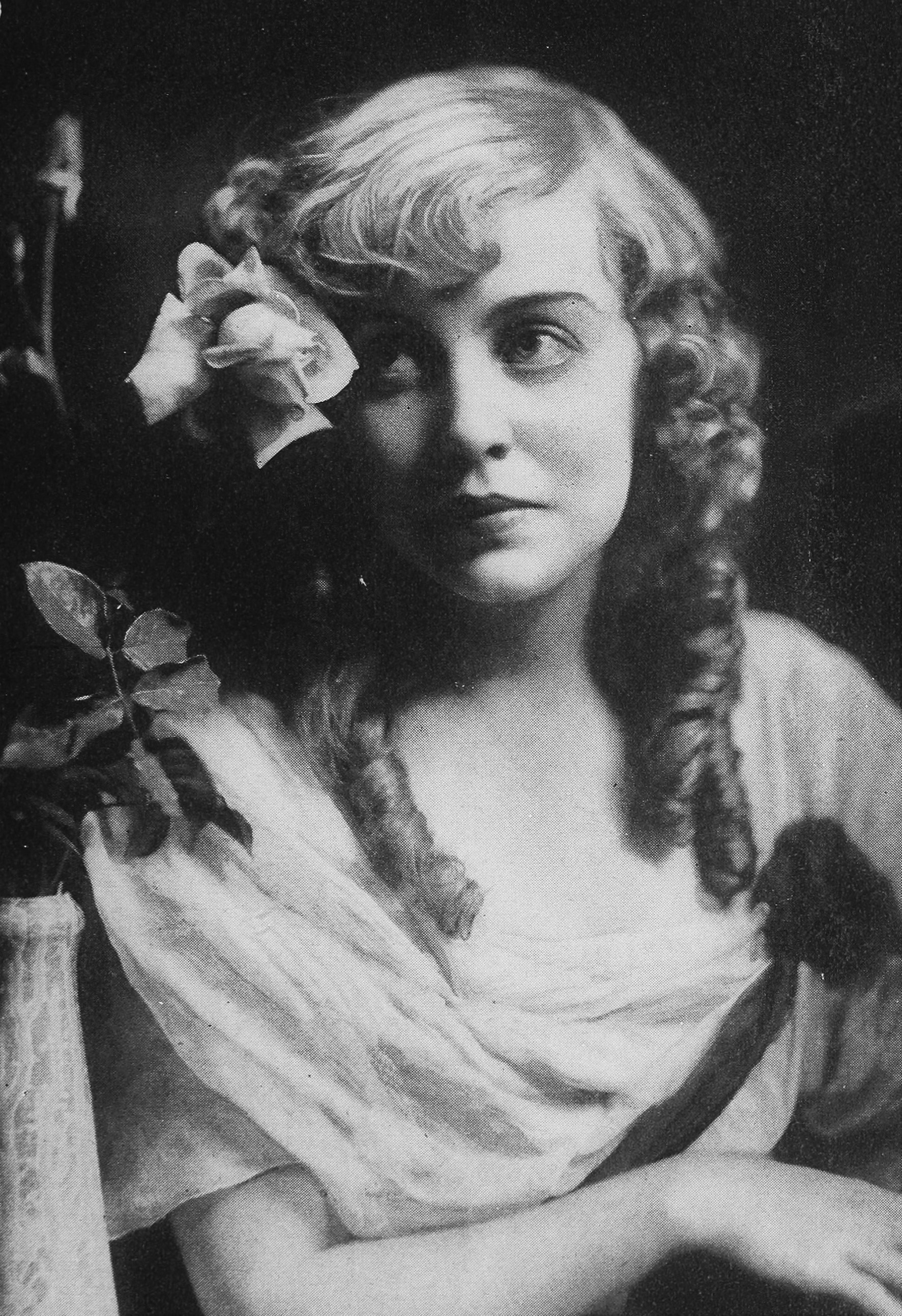
Violet MacMillan

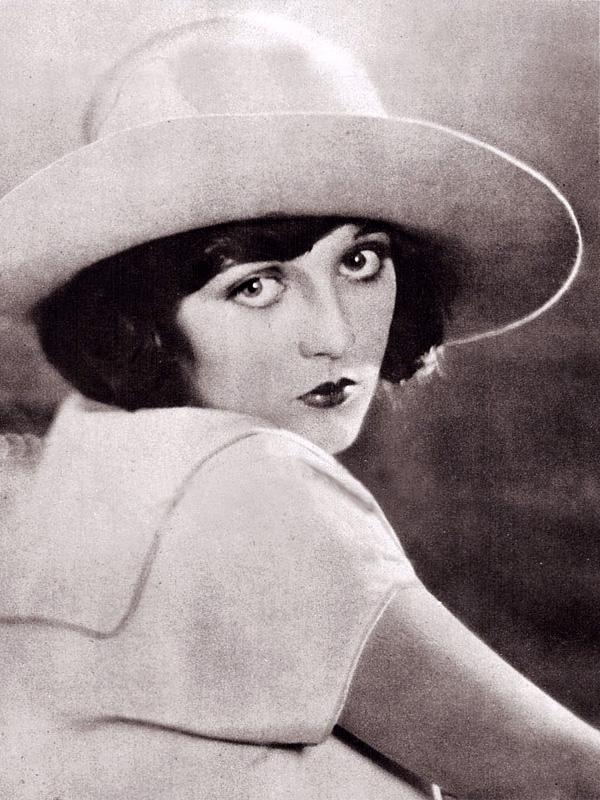
Dorothy Dwan

Dorothy Dwan portrayed Dorothy in the 1925 film Wizard of Oz. In this film, Aunt Em (Mary Carr) informs her on her eighteenth birthday that she was left on their doorstep and is really a princess of Oz destined to marry Prince Kynd (Bryant Washburn), who has currently lost the throne to Prime Minister Kruel (Josef Swickard), in a storyline similar to that of His Majesty the Scarecrow of Oz, only with Dorothy as the love interest. In the end, the story proves to be the dream of a little girl who has fallen asleep listening to the story of Kynd and Kruel, said to be the story of The Wonderful Wizard of Oz. The film also introduced the idea of the farmhands also being the Scarecrow, Tin Woodsman and Cowardly Lion, albeit as costumes they don in order to conceal themselves in Oz.

=== The Wizard of Oz (1939) ===
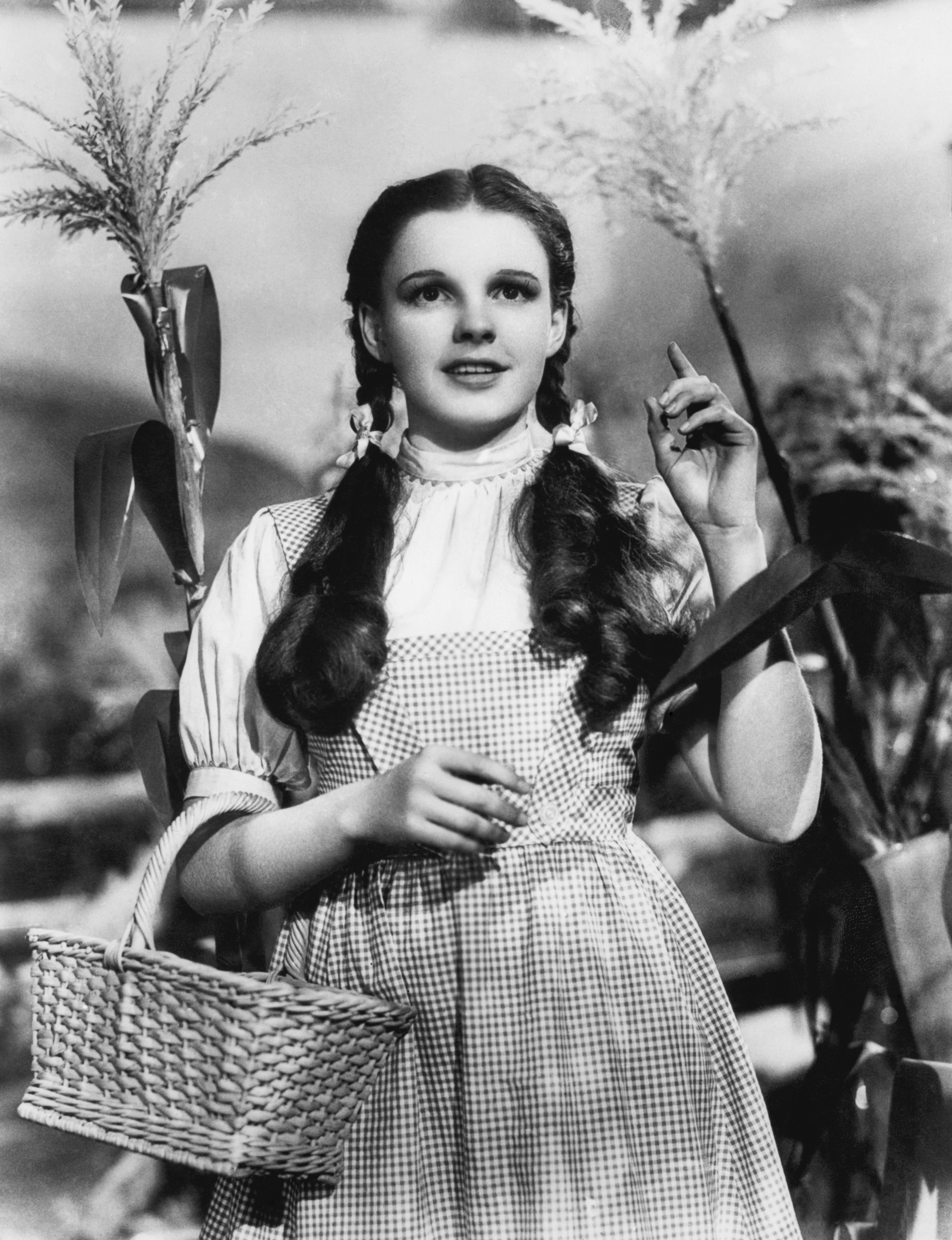
Judy Garland as Dorothy in The Wizard of Oz (1939)

In the 1939 movie The Wizard of Oz, Dorothy was played by Judy Garland, who received an Academy Juvenile Award for her performance. Since she was sixteen years old at the time of filming, Garland's maturing figure was bound into a figure-hiding corset. Although Dorothy's age is not stated in the film, the shooting script describes her as twelve years old. As fantasy films generally were unsuccessful at that time, Metro-Goldwyn-Mayer portrayed Oz as a head-trauma-induced delirium, instead of a real place. Dorothy's characterization in the 1939 film is more of a damsel in distress, somewhat unlike the adventurous, forthright and bold Dorothy of the books.

She is reunited with Aunt Em, Uncle Henry, their three farm workers (Scarecrow, Tin Man, and Cowardly Lion's alter egos), and Professor Marvel (The Wizard's alter ego) when she awakens from being unconscious at the end of this film, back at home, safe and proclaiming the film's theme and moral: "There's no place like home" (also fulfilling the numerous foreshadows earlier in the story). While it is implied that Oz is merely Dorothy's dream since she awakens in bed at the end, Dorothy is convinced that her journey was all in fact real.

The majority of The Wizard of Oz, comprising the scenes taking place in the Land of Oz, was filmed in three-strip Technicolor, becoming M-G-M's second feature made mostly or fully in the process, following the all-color Sweethearts (1938). The rest of the film was shot in black-and-white and printed in monochromatic sepiatone. To take advantage of the Technicolor process, screenwriter Noel Langley substituted the famous magic silver slippers of Baum's novel for ruby slippers, a change carried over in the produced work.

=== Other versions ===
In The Wiz, a 1978 film adaptation of the 1975 Broadway musical of the same name, Dorothy is played by Diana Ross.

In Disney's 1985 fantasy adventure film Return to Oz, Dorothy was played by child actress Fairuza Balk.

In the video for Blues Traveler's 1994 hit song "Run-Around", Dorothy tries to get into a club where the band is performing. She is portrayed by actress Diana Marquis.

In Disney's 2013 film Oz the Great and Powerful, Dorothy's maternal origins are hinted at when Annie (Michelle Williams) informs her friend Oscar Diggs that her fiancé's surname is Gale.

Dorothy appears in the CGI-animated film Legends of Oz: Dorothy's Return (which is based on Dorothy of Oz), voiced by Lea Michele.

Dorothy made a cameo appearance in The Lego Movie 2: The Second Part, voiced by Maya Rudolph. She, Toto, Scarecrow, Tin Man, and Cowardly Lion find themselves having been transported from the Land of Oz to Harmony Town in the Systar System.

Dorothy appears in the South Korean animated film Red Shoes and the Seven Dwarfs, voiced by Katie DiCicco.

Dorothy appears in Universal Pictures' two-part film adaptation of Wicked, based on the 2003 musical of the same name, alongside Toto, Scarecrow, Tin Man, and Cowardly Lion. She is portrayed by Bethany Weaver. All five make a cameo in the first film and have a bigger role in the second film, Wicked: For Good. For reasons to keep the main characters, Glinda and Elphaba, align in the film, Dorothy's face is unseen.

=== In television ===
The 2007 Sci-Fi Channel miniseries Tin Man reworked her into DG, a descendant of Dorothy's, and is played by Zooey Deschanel. In this iteration, the trademark dress is actually a diner waitress uniform; the rest of the time she wears a leather jacket and jeans and rides a motorcycle. When she is taken into Oz, she learns that she is actually the princess of the kingdom of Oz, sent to another world and raised by androids that protect her after her sister was possessed by the spirit of an ancient witch that she unleashed by accident.

In the 2012 TV miniseries Dorothy and the Witches of Oz, Dorothy (played by Paulie Rojas) is shown as an adult writer and starts regaining repressed memories of her actual adventures in the Land of Oz when the Wicked Witch of the West plans to conquer the Land of Oz and all of Earth.

Dorothy appears in the ninth season of Supernatural, portrayed by Tiio Horn. This version is Dorothy Baum. Dorothy is a hunter whose father was L. Frank Baum, a member of the Men of Letters. Desperate when it appeared that The Wicked Witch could not be killed, Dorothy used a spell to bind herself and the Wicked Witch, keeping them both trapped in stasis at the Men of Letters bunker for decades. They were finally freed by Sam and Dean Winchester. After Charlie Bradbury killed the Wicked Witch, she and Dorothy went to Oz in order to continue fighting against the Witch's forces.

Dorothy appears in the third and fifth seasons of the TV series Once Upon a Time. In this show, Dorothy is from a fictional version of Kansas and not from Earth (dubbed the Land Without Magic in the show). She is portrayed as an adult by Teri Reeves and as a child by Matreya Scarrwener. Dorothy, caught in her Kansas farmhouse during a raging cyclone, is swept away to Oz. Taken in by the protectors of Oz, the sisterhood of witches, she comes to view them as family. One night, she is confronted by Zelena the Witch of the West (Rebecca Mader), while getting water from a well. Zelena intends to get rid of Dorothy as she believes the girl is destined to usurp her seat in the sisterhood. In defense, Dorothy throws a bucket of water at Zelena; causing the witch to melt. Glinda the Witch of the South (Sunny Mabrey), then appears to offer her to take Zelena's place as the Witch of the West, but Dorothy declines; wishing only to return home. With Glinda's help, she is taken to see the Wizard and given a pair of silver slippers to travel to any world. Dorothy thanks the Wizard of Oz (Christopher Gorham) and proceeds to click the slippers' heels three times to send herself home. Only after the girl's departure, Glinda discovers too late that Zelena masqueraded as the Wizard in order to usher Dorothy out of Oz.

Upon returning to Kansas, Dorothy tells her family about her experiences in Oz. However, her family does not believe her, and attempts to get her admitted into an asylum. Her aunt, Emily Brown (Gina Stockdale) is the only person who believes her, and refuses to let her be admitted. However, Aunt Em dies, gifting Dorothy a puppy named Toto before she does. Years pass, and Dorothy returns to Oz. Learning from the Munchkins that Zelena is still alive and no longer fearing the witch, Dorothy storms the palace in time to stop Zelena from stealing the Scarecrow's (Paul Scheer) brain for a time spell. Dorothy taunts Zelena about having one thing she'll never obtain, the love of the people, as Zelena prepares a fireball to destroy her. Toto, hopping out of the bag, trots up to the palace curtains, while Dorothy ducks to avoid Zelena's fireball, which hits an approaching guard. Toto then tugs a string, causing the curtains to fall on Zelena, who fumbles to get free. While she is occupied, Dorothy escapes the palace with the Scarecrow and her dog. Later, she and her companions hide out in a cottage, but Zelena eventually finds them, after putting a tracking spell on Dorothy's old bicycle. Dorothy does her best to protect the Scarecrow, but Zelena ends up ripping out his brain. Fearlessly standing up to the witch, Dorothy dares Zelena to do her worst, while boasting that she'll never be afraid of her again. Zelena expresses brief interest in her brave attitude, wondering what made her change. In the end, Zelena leaves Dorothy unharmed to let the people of Oz see that, for once, their great hero has failed them.

In Emerald City, Dorothy is an adult when she is taken to Oz, working as a nurse. She is still living with Em and Henry, but here they are identified as her adopted parents, her biological mother having left her with them as a baby and only recently getting back in touch with Dorothy. Months after receiving the letter, Dorothy makes her first official visit to her biological mother when the tornado occurs that takes her to Oz. Faced with an Oz that is increasingly opposed to magic on the Wizard's orders and accused of the death of the Witch of the East - which was initially an accident and later self-defence when the Witch survived her injuries - Dorothy learns more about her true ties to this world as she searches for answers, accompanied by a police German Shepherd she names 'Toto' and the amnesic Lucas. The TV series concludes with her returning to Earth after the wizard's forces are decimated by the Beast Forever, but she is subsequently contacted by Lucas and Toto - both of whom she left behind in Oz - appearing to her in Kansas to ask for help.

Although not a direct adaptation to the literature itself, the 2013 Super Sentai series, Zyuden Sentai Kyoryuger features the Deboth Army's members being themed after the characters in The Wonderful Wizard of Oz. The then-Joyful Knight Canderrilla is designed with the motif of Dorothy Gale

In the 2017-2020 animated series Dorothy and the Wizard of Oz, Dorothy is voiced by Kari Wahlgren who is portraying a much younger and race swapped version. Set after the events of the 1939 film, Dorothy is appointed the princess of Oz by Queen Ozma, where she and her friends go on adventures and save the Land of Oz from danger like the tyrannical Nome King and Wilhelmina, the niece of the Wicked Witch of the West who wants to steal the Ruby Slippers to revive her evil aunt. In the show, Dorothy is depicted as a courageous and helpful character. She consistently assists her friends when they are in danger and shares customs from Kansas with the inhabitats of Oz. Although generally depicted as cheerful, Dorothy can become angry when her emotions are influenced by external factors, such as a mood ring controlled by Wilhelmina. She plays an active role in opposing the forces of evil in Oz.

=== In video games ===
==== Wizard101 ====
Dorothy Gale appears as an NPC in the 2008 MMORPG Wizard101. Unlike other adaptations of the character, Dorothy travelled from her family farm in Kansas to Wizard City to become a Balance wizard at Ravenwood School of Magical Arts. In the sidequests "Yellow Brick Road" and "Not in Kansas Anymore", players meet Dorothy in her home, who tells them to go and check on her friends that she was having over for dinner, Mr. Toto and the Tin Man. Mr. Toto tells the player that they are running late due to Tin Man not being able to find his oil can, and asks the player to tell Dorothy that they are just running late as usual.

==== Emerald City Confidential ====
In the 2009 adventure game Emerald City Confidential, Dorothy Gale is forty years older and prefers to be called Dee. She hires a private eye named Petra to find her missing fiancé, Anzel, which becomes Petra's primary mission for the game.

==== LEGO Dimensions ====
Dorothy Gale is one of the non-playable characters that appears in the 2015 toys-to-life video game Lego Dimensions. While on her way to the Emerald City with Toto and her three companions, they confront Batman, Gandalf, and Wyldstyle. Batman thinks the Scarecrow is the supervillain of the same name from his world, though the interrogation is short-lived when Dorothy and her gang are sucked into a vortex and kidnapped by the game's main antagonist, Lord Vortech. Lord Vortech imprisons Dorothy and uses the Ruby Slippers as one of the foundation elements needed to create his "perfect world".

== Portrayals ==
Year	Title	Artist	Notes
1902	The Wizard of Oz	Anna Laughlin	stage musical
1908	The Fairylogue and Radio-Plays	Romola Remus	
1910	The Wizard of Oz	Bebe Daniels	
1914	His Majesty, the Scarecrow of Oz	Violet MacMillan	
1925	The Wizard of Oz	Dorothy Dwan	
1939	The Wizard of Oz	Judy Garland	Famous classic movie
1957	The Rainbow Road to Oz	Darlene Gillespie	
1961	Tales of the Wizard of Oz	Corinne Conley	
1964	Return to Oz	Susan Conway (speaking voice) Susan Morse (singing voice)	
1971	Ayşecik ve Sihirli Cüceler Rüyalar Ülkesinde	Zeynep Değirmencioğlu	Turkish film
1972	Journey Back to Oz	Liza Minnelli (voice)	Animated film
1976	Oz	Joy Dunstan	
1975	The Wiz	Stephanie Mills	
1978	The Wiz	Diana Ross	
1982	The Wizard of Oz	Mari Okamoto (Japanese track)	
1983	The Wizard of Oz	Aileen Quinn (English track)	
1985	Return to Oz	Fairuza Balk	
1986–1987	The Wonderful Wizard of Oz	Sumi Shimamoto (Japanese track), Morgan Hallett (English track)	
1987	Dorothy Meets Ozma of Oz	Janice Hiromi Kawaye	
1988	The Wizard of A.I.D.S.	Martha Murphy	
1990	The Wonderful Galaxy of Oz	Mariko Kouda	
1990	The Dreamer of Oz: The L. Frank Baum Story	Courtney Barilla	
1991	The Wizard of Oz	Liz Georges (voice)	
1995	The Wizard of Oz (British TV version)	Denise Van Outen	
1995	The Wizard of Oz in Concert: Dreams Come True	Jewel	
1996–1997	The Oz Kids (animated series)	Erika Schickel	
2001	The Wizard of Oz (stage show)	Nikki Webster	
2005	The Muppets' Wizard of Oz	Ashanti	
2007	The Wonderful Wizard of Ha's	Lisa Vischer	Junior Asparagus as Darby (replacing Dorothy)
2007	Tin Man	Zooey Deschanel, Rachel Pattee, Alexis Llewellyn, Grace Wheeler	D.G., Young D.G., and the Grey Gale
2011	The Wizard of Oz	Danielle Hope, Sophie Evans, Danielle Wade	Various stage productions
2011	The Witches of Oz	Paulie Redding	
2011	Tom and Jerry and the Wizard of Oz	Grey DeLisle	
2011	After the Wizard	Jordan Van Vranken (limited information)	
2012	Dorothy and the Witches of Oz	Paulie Rojas	
2013	Supernatural	Tiio Horn	Episode "Slumber Party")
2013	Legends of Oz: Dorothy's Return	Lea Michele	
2015	The Wiz Live!	Shanice Williams	
2016	Once Upon a Time	Teri Reeves	Season 5
2014	Dorothy Must Die	-	Novel by Danielle Paige
2015	Lego Dimensions	Laura Bailey	
2016	Tom and Jerry: Back to Oz	Grey DeLisle	
2017	Emerald City	Adria Arjona	
2017–2020	Dorothy and the Wizard of Oz	Kari Wahlgren	
2017	Lost in Oz	Ashley Boettcher	
2019	The Lego Movie 2: The Second Part	Maya Rudolph	
2019	Red Shoes and the Seven Dwarfs	Katie DiCicco	
2025	Wicked: For Good	Bethany Weaver	

== Impact on LGBTQ community ==
In the 1950s, the phrase "friend of Dorothy" became used as a slang term for homosexuals. This term is attributed both to American author and fellow gay icon Dorothy Parker, and to Judy Garland's prominent role as Dorothy Gale in The Wizard of Oz. This gay slang term, also known as "FOD," means a gay man; and more broadly, any LGBTQ person. As such, someone was a friend of Dorothy was a euphemism used for discussing sexual orientation without others knowing its meaning. James Deutsch, program curator with the Smithsonian Center for Folklife and Cultural Heritage, examined the origin of the phrase, noting scholars who argued that Garland became a "lodestone" for "gay culture", claimed by the community, and argued that the phrase shows "several of the most important functions of folklore that serve members of the LGBT community." However, Dee Michel, a scholar of Oz, said there are certain beliefs that continue about the connection between the film and LGBTQ people that "persist in spite of a lack of clear historical evidence." Additionally, a Dorothy dollar is described as any business generated by "providing goods and services to the homosexual community."

Dorothy appears in seasons 3, 5, and 6 of the TV series Once Upon a Time, and has a relationship with Ruby Lucas (Little Red Riding Hood), with the latter awakening her with a kiss in her final episode.

== See also ==
- "Surrender Dorothy"
- Dorothy and the Wizard of Oz
- Dorothy and the Wizard in Oz
- Dorothy and the Witches of Oz
- Dorothy of Oz
  - book
  - CGI-animated film
- Oz Park, Chicago, USA
