= Roger S. Baum =

American novelist

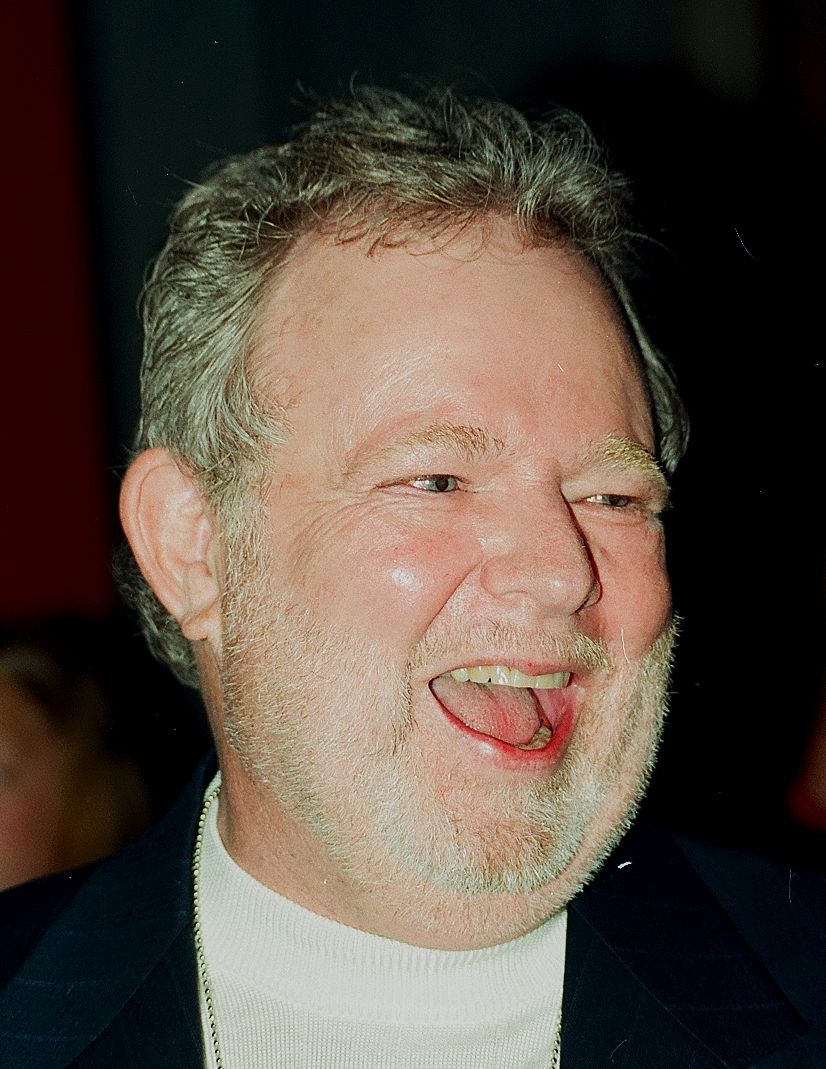
- Born: Roger Stanton Baum
- Occupations: Author; banker; stockbroker; schoolteacher
- Relatives: Frank Joslyn Baum (grandfather); L. Frank Baum (great-grandfather); Maud Gage Baum (great-grandmother); Harry Neal Baum (granduncle); Matilda Joslyn Gage (great-great-grandmother)
- Writing career
- Notable works: Dorothy of Oz; Lion of Oz and the Badge of Courage

Roger Stanton Baum is an American author of children's books and a former banker and stockbroker. He is a great-grandson of L. Frank Baum, author of the original Oz books.

== Biography ==
Baum is a former resident of Los Angeles, since which he has lived in Missouri (Springfield) and Nevada (Las Vegas). Baum is a great-grandson of L. Frank Baum, the original creator of the "Oz" series, and grandson of Frank Joslyn Baum, who published The Laughing Dragon of Oz in 1935. Many of Roger S. Baum's children's books are set in the same world.

Baum had written short stories and another children's book, entitled Long Ears And Tailspin In Candy Land (1968), before being asked by the International Wizard of Oz Club in 1987 to write original "Oz" stories. The success of his "Oz" books allowed him to leave his banking job in 1990, and become a full-time children's author. Sometimes Baum's earlier material is reworked in his later books; Long Ears And Tailspin In Candy Land's "Candy Land" reappears in his 2000 Toto book, for example. His work does not follow the history of the canon Famous Forty Oz books and in some cases disregards continuity present in his great-grandfather's original fourteen.

Baum's book Lion of Oz and the Badge of Courage was adapted into the film Lion of Oz (2000). A film adaptation of his book Dorothy of Oz was produced by Summertime Entertainment. It was titled Legends of Oz: Dorothy's Return, and was released in 2014.

== Selected bibliography ==
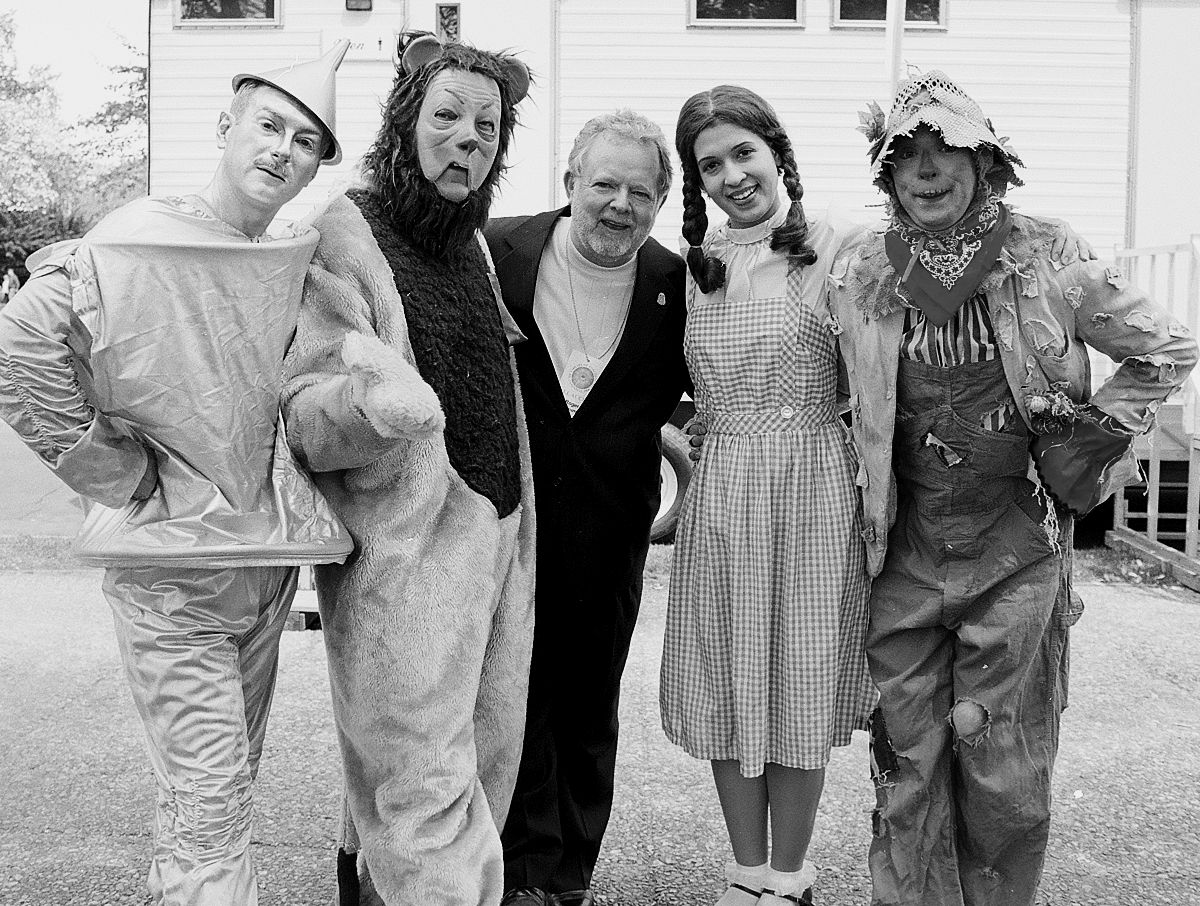
Baum with Wizard of Oz characters

Oz series:

1. Dorothy of Oz (1989, 2012), illus. by Elizabeth Miles
2. The Rewolf of Oz (1990), illus. Charlotte Hart
3. The SillyOzbuls of Oz (1991), illus. Lisa Mertins
4. The SillyOzbul of Oz and Toto (1992), illus. Lisa Mertins
5. The SillyOzbul of Oz and the Magic Merry-Go-Round (1992), illus. Lisa Mertins
6. Lion of Oz and the Badge of Courage (1995, 2003), illus. Sean Coons
7. The Green Star of Oz: A Special Oz Story (2000), illus. Victoria Seitzinger
8. Toto in Candy Land of Oz (2000), illus. Ronit Berkovitz
9. The Wizard of Oz and the Magic Merry-Go-Round (2002), illus. Victoria Seitzinger
10. Toto of Oz and the Surprise Party (2004), illus. Victoria Seitzinger
11. The Oz Odyssey (2006), illus. Victoria Seitzinger
12. Candy Cane: An Oz Christmas Tale (2010), illus. Chad Thomas
13. Oz Odyssey II (2011), illus. Chad Thomas
14. The Oz Enigma (2013), illus. Kathy Hoyt

Stand-alone:

- Long Ears and Tailspin in Candy Land: A Faraway Adventure (1968), illus. Mary Ann Farmer
