= The Wizard of Oz (TV series) =

Animated television series based on the 1939 movie

- Genre: Action; Adventure; Comedy; Family; Fantasy; Musical
- Based on: The Wonderful Wizard of Oz by L. Frank Baum The Wizard of Oz by Noel Langley; Florence Ryerson; Edgar Allan Woolf
- Developed by: Doug Molitor
- Written by: Elana Lesser; Cliff Ruby; Doug Molitor
- Voices of: Charlie Adler; Pat Fraley; Liz Georges; David Lodge; Tress MacNeille; Alan Oppenheimer; Hal Rayle; B. J. Ward; Frank Welker
- Composer: Tom Worrall
- Country of origin: United States
- Original language: English
- No. of seasons: 1
- No. of episodes: 13

Production
- Executive producer: Andy Heyward
- Running time: 30 minutes
- Production companies: DIC Animation City; Turner Entertainment Co.

Original release
- Network: ABC
- Release: September 8 – December 28, 1990

The Wizard of Oz is a 1990 American animated series produced by DIC Animation City to capitalize on the popularity of the 1939 film version, to which DiC had acquired the rights from Turner Entertainment Co. The series aired for thirteen episodes and premiered on ABC, starting on September 8, 1990. The show presented a number of stories and characters from L. Frank Baum's original Oz series.

Author Jeff Lenburg mentioned an aspect of the series wherein Dorothy has to learn to believe in herself.

In the series, Dorothy uses the ruby slippers to return to Oz. She learns that the winged monkeys have already resurrected the Wicked Witch of the West, who has conquered the Emerald City. The Wizard is trapped with a spell involving a never-ending wind, and Dorothy has to rescue him.

Despite using the slippers to return to Oz, in the episodes, Dorothy is not entirely sure how the slippers work. Glinda often tells Dorothy to only use the slippers as a last resort. In one episode, Dorothy clicks her heels four times, as if each click is more powerful than the last. Aside from the pilot, generally when the slippers are used, they do not always help in the best way.

== Plot ==
Dorothy has decided to return to Oz with Toto, by using the ruby slippers that showed up on her doorstep. She invokes her return by clicking her heels and reciting "There is no place like Oz". Upon arriving there, she reunites with Scarecrow, Tin Man, and Cowardly Lion.

Dorothy learns from Glinda that the Wicked Witch of the West has been resurrected by Truckle and his fellow winged monkeys. With the Wicked Witch of the West back from the dead, the Emerald City has been taken over by her and she has stolen the gifts that were given to Scarecrow, Tin Man, and Cowardly Lion.

The Wizard is in his hot air balloon, which is under a spell that causes it to be constantly blown around by an evil wind. Dorothy, Toto, Scarecrow, Tin Man, and Cowardly Lion set out to rescue him and defeat the Wicked Witch once and for all.

== Cast ==
=== Principal voice actors ===
- Liz Georges – Dorothy Gale
- David Lodge – Scarecrow
- Hal Rayle – Tin Man
- Charlie Adler – Cowardly Lion
- Frank Welker – Toto, Hyena (ep. 6), Truckle
- Tress MacNeille – Wicked Witch of the West, Miranda (ep. 10)
- B. J. Ward – Glinda
- Alan Oppenheimer – Wizard of Oz

==== Additional voices ====
- Jack Angel
- Hamilton Camp
- Pat Fraley
- Bibi Osterwald
- Rob Paulsen
- Ken Sansom
- Susan Silo – Munchkin Mayor (ep. 1)

== Crew ==
- Susan Blu – voice director
- Ginny McSwain – casting director

== Comparison with source material ==
The series incorporated music and visual elements from the 1939 film version, including the Scarecrow's diploma and Dorothy's ruby slippers. At the same time, the character of Dorothy was designed with an appearance similar to that of Princess Ariel from Disney's The Little Mermaid and was not intended to resemble Judy Garland. In the film, it is largely implied that Oz was a head-trauma-induced delirium, instead of a real place, while in the TV series (as in the book), it was a real land.

=== Film soundtrack ===
Two elements from the film appear in the opening theme:

1. When the Winged Monkeys resurrect the Witch, the latter's and Miss Gulch's theme is heard in the background.
2. When the team says "We're off to save the wizard", an instrumental version of "We're Off to See the Wizard" is played.

== Episodes ==
No.	Title	Original release date
1	"The Rescue of the Emerald City: Part 1"	September 8, 1990
Dorothy returns to Oz and learns from Glinda that the Wicked Witch has been resurrected by a magic ritual by Truckle and his fellow winged monkeys. The Wicked Witch has taken over the Emerald City in an attempt to rule over the Land of Oz. She also created an evil wind to blow around the Wizard's balloon and stole the gifts he gave to Scarecrow, Tin Man, and Cowardly Lion.
2	"The Rescue of the Emerald City: Part 2"	September 15, 1990
Dorothy sets out to rescue Toto and Cowardly Lion, who have been kidnapped by the Wicked Witch and taken to the Emerald City.
3	"Fearless"	September 22, 1990
Cowardly Lion is tricked by the Wicked Witch and put under a spell that makes him fearless.
4	"Crystal Clear"	September 29, 1990
The Wicked Witch of the West sets out to find a crystal ball that will always work, and it is up to the Scarecrow to protect the crystal ball, with or without a brain.
5	"We're Not in Kansas Anymore"	October 6, 1990
The Wicked Witch of the West creates a false Kansas and tricks Dorothy into visiting it in hopes of getting the Ruby Slippers. She poses as Aunt Em while Truckle poses as Uncle Henry.
6	"The Lion that Squeaked"	October 13, 1990
The Wicked Witch of the West uses her magic to steal Cowardly Lion's roar and give it to a hyena that is Cowardly Lion's rival.
7	"Dream a Little Dream"	October 20, 1990
Dorothy, Scarecrow, Tin Man, and Cowardly Lion are trapped in the Cowardly Lion's dreams as the Wicked Witch of the West enters the dream to trap them there forever.
8	"A Star Is Gone"	October 30, 1990
The Wicked Witch of the West is able to annul the Ruby Slippers' abilities entirely by capturing a red Luminary (teardrop-shaped creatures who control all color in Oz) and forcing him to drain the red magical glow from the slippers, rendering them powerless.
9	"Time Town"	November 3, 1990
The Wicked Witch of the West begins erasing the Land of Oz's history, thus causing Glinda and the Wizard to lose their memories.
10	"The Marvelous Milkmaid of Mechanica"	December 10, 1990
Dorothy, Scarecrow, Tin Man, and Cowardly Lion arrive in Mechanica where everything is made of tin.
11	"Upside-Down Town"	December 17, 1990
Dorothy, Scarecrow, Tin Man, and Cowardly Lion end up in Upside-Down Town where everything is the opposite.
12	"The Day the Music Died"	December 24, 1990
Dorothy, Scarecrow, Tin Man, and Cowardly Lion follow the Wizard to Music Town where they must help the town's citizen's get their music back which the Wicked Witch has stolen.
13	"Hot Air"	December 28, 1990
The Wizard's balloon is heading for Pincushion Pass and the heroes are helpless to come to his aid while getting involved in a balloon race.

== International and re-airings ==
After its run on ABC, the series reaired on Bohbot Entertainment's Amazin' Adventures block from 1992 to 1993, Disney Channel from 1991 to 1992, Toon Disney from the channel's launch in 1998 until 2002 and on HBO from 1995 to 1996.

In Canada, the series aired on YTV from 1990 to 1995.

== Home media ==
=== United States ===
"The Marvelous Milkmaid of Mechanica" has never been released in the United States in any home video format. "The Lion that Squeaked" is available only on VHS.

Release	Format	Episodes	Distributor	Release date
The Rescue of Oz	VHS	The Rescue of the Emerald City Part I The Rescue of the Emerald City Part II	Turner Home Entertainment	1991
Danger in a Strange Land	VHS	Time Town; The Day the Music Died	Turner Home Entertainment	1991
We're Off to Save the Wizard	VHS	Upside Downtown; A Star is Gone	Turner Home Entertainment	1991
Ruby Slipper Slip Up	VHS	The Lion that Squeaked; A Star is Gone	Turner Home Entertainment	1991
Fearless	VHS	Fearless	Buena Vista Home Video	1994
Crystal Clear	VHS	Crystal Clear	Buena Vista Home Video	1994
The Rescue of the Emerald City Part I	VHS	The Rescue of the Emerald City Part I	Buena Vista Home Video	1994
The Rescue of the Emerald City Part II	VHS	The Rescue of the Emerald City Part II	Buena Vista Home Video	1994
Rescue of the Emerald City	VHS/DVD	The Rescue of the Emerald City Part I The Rescue of the Emerald City Part II; The Day the Music Died (DVD only)	Lions Gate Home Entertainment; Trimark Home Video	April 23, 2002
The Continuing Story	VHS/DVD	Time Town; We're not in Kansas Anymore; Crystal Clear; Fearless (DVD only)	Sterling Entertainment Group	September 2, 2003
We're Off to Save the Wizard!	VHS/DVD	Hot Air; A Star is Gone; Upside Downtown; Dream a Little Dream (DVD only)	Sterling Entertainment Group	September 5, 2005

=== United Kingdom ===
Release	Format	Episodes	Distributor	Release date
The Wizard of Oz - Volume 1	VHS/DVD	The Rescue of the Emerald City Part I The Rescue of the Emerald City Part II; Crystal Clear; Fearless	Anchor Bay UK	2004
The Wizard of Oz - Volume 2	DVD	The Marvelous Milkmaid Of Mechanica; The Lion That Squeaked; A Star is Gone; Hot Air	Anchor Bay UK	2004
The Wizard of Oz - Volume 1	DVD	A Star is Gone; Dream a Little Dream	Avenue Entertainment	2005
The Wizard of Oz - Volume 2	DVD	We're Not in Kansas Anymore; Time Town	Avenue Entertainment	2005

== See also ==
- Adaptations of The Wizard of Oz
