= The Wonderful Wizard of Oz (TV series) =

1986 TV series

- Title card from the English-language version

オズの魔法使い (Oz no Mahōtsukai)
- Genre: Adventure; Fantasy
- Anime television series
- Directed by: Masaru Tonogawachi (1-41); Hiroshi Saitō (42-52)
- Produced by: Tetsurō Kumase
- Written by: Akira Miyazaki; Takafumi Nagamine; Hiroshi Saitō
- Music by: Japanese version K.S Yoshimura; Takao Naoi; Cinar version Hagood Hardy; Tom Szczesniak; Ray Parker
- Studio: Panmedia
- Licensed by: Enoki Films; Discotek Media
- Original network: MegaTON (TV Tokyo)
- English network: AU: ABC-TV; CA: ASN; HK: ATV World; NZ: Channel 2; US: HBO; ZA: TV2
- Original run: October 6, 1986 – September 28, 1987
- Episodes: 52

The Wonderful Wizard of Oz, known in Japan as Ozu no Mahōtsukai (オズの魔法使い), is a Japanese anime television series adaptation based on four of the original early 20th century Oz books by L. Frank Baum. In Japan, the series aired on TV Tokyo from 1986 to 1987. It consists of 52 episodes, which explain other parts of the Oz stories, including the events that happened after Dorothy returned home.

The books adapted for the series include the first three novels – The Wonderful Wizard of Oz (1900), The Marvelous Land of Oz (1904), and Ozma of Oz (1907) – as well as the sixth, The Emerald City of Oz (1910).

One of the TV series' writers, Akira Miyazaki, also wrote for the 1982 anime film of the same Japanese name. The series was also the final adaption of the series before the source material entered the public domain in 1989.

Many of the series' staffers, such as director Hiroshi Saitō and character designer Shūichi Seki, also worked on Nippon Animation's World Masterpiece Theater, so that the look and narrative style of the series feel similar to a WMT anime even though Nippon Animation itself was not involved in the production.

The show has been aired in several countries outside of Japan and has been dubbed in English, Spanish, Italian, Indonesian and many other languages.

== Plot ==
The Wonderful Wizard of Oz is split into four distinct parts, or story arcs, each loosely based on different Oz books originally written by L. Frank Baum.

=== The Wonderful Wizard of Oz (episodes 1 to 17) ===
The first story arc is an adaptation of the first Oz book, The Wonderful Wizard of Oz (1900). It follows the adventures of Dorothy, an orphan girl living out in the gray prairies of Kansas with her Aunt Em, her Uncle Henry and her dog Toto. One day, after Em and Uncle Henry leave Dorothy and Toto alone in order to travel into town, a tornado appears, uproots the farmhouse, with Dorothy and Toto inside, and transports it to the Land of Oz.

In Oz Dorothy meets the Good Witch of the North, who tells her that she just killed the Wicked Witch of the East, as her house landed directly on top of her, and by doing so she freed the Munchkins from slavery. She also tells her that the only person able to send her back home is the Wizard of Oz. Dorothy is given the Silver Shoes of the Wicked Witch of the East and sent off along the Yellow Brick Road towards the Emerald City to see the Wonderful Wizard of Oz in hope of getting back to Kansas.

On her way to the Wizard, Dorothy meets the Scarecrow, made entirely of straw and lacking a brain, the Tin Woodman, made entirely from metal and lacking a heart, and the Cowardly Lion who wishes to become brave. Along their journey, the group comes to a large ditch in the road, and the Lion provides transportation by jumping across while the others sit on his back. The group then enters a dark forest and become trapped at the edge of a steep canyon, while being chased by the Kalidahs (animals with the bodies of bears and the heads of tigers). The Lion and the Scarecrow distract them as the Tin Man cuts down a tree which enables the group to cross the opening of the canyon. After escaping the Kalidahs, the Scarecrow gets caught in the middle of a river on a pole which cuts them off from the Yellow Brick Road, but luckily Mrs. Crane (an actual crane) saves him. A deadly field of poppies puts Dorothy, Toto and the Lion to sleep, but they manage to escape with the help of the Mouse Queen, and her subjects, whom the Tin Man rescued from a wildcat. They arrive at the Emerald City the next day, and thanks to the Good Witch of the North's kiss (on Dorothy's forehead) they are let in.

Once they are in the Emerald City, they request to see the Wizard of Oz. The Wizard grants an individual audience to each of them in a dark reception hall and changes his appearance with each one of them—he meets Dorothy, as a Giant Head; the Scarecrow, as a lovely angel-like lady; the Tin Man, as a terrible beast; and the Lion, as a ball of fire. He tells them that he will help them only if they kill the Wicked Witch of the West.

The friends then set off on a quest for the castle of the Wicked Witch of the West. Meanwhile, the Wicked Witch of the West is busy forcing the Winkies (her slaves) to build her a new fortress which she will use to conquer the Land of Oz. As she senses the friends coming, and confirms it by seeing them in her magic mirror, she sends out wolves, crows and an army of her Winkie Soldiers—which Dorothy and her friends easily beat. The friends meet an old Winkie, the former Mayor, who fills them in on the Wicked Witch of the West. The Witch uses her Golden Cap to command the Winged Monkeys, ordering them to bring her the Lion and kill the rest. As the group near the witch's castle, the Winged Monkeys attack who manage to destroy the Scarecrow (by emptying his body) and the Tin Man (by dropping him from a great height). They are, however, unable to harm Dorothy due to the Good Witch's kiss and are forced to take her along with the captured Lion. The Wicked Witch of the West keeps the Lion locked in a cell intending to use him to pull her carriage. She decides to spare Dorothy and keep her as her personal cook upon seeing she has the magic shoes and tries various tricks to get them off her feet, to no avail. Dorothy eventually tips a large water jar upon the Witch, and all her evil work dies with her as she melts away. The grateful Winkies then help Dorothy find her friends and restore them. Soon the friends are together again, and Dorothy discovers the Wicked Witch's Golden Cap. Her friends make her promise that she will not use the cap to summon the Winged Monkeys, as the idea terrifies them.

As the group spends a few days relaxing in the Witch's castle with their new Winkie friends, they are visited by a boy named Tip and his guardian, Mombi. Mombi is a witch in training and upon hearing that her old friend the Wicked Witch of the West is dead, she decides to steal the Golden Cap from Dorothy. She transforms herself into a large gray cat and attempts to steal the cap while Dorothy is sleeping. Her plot is thwarted by the Cowardly Lion. Tip explains Mombi's plot and apologizes to Dorothy. Dorothy uses the Golden Cap, against her friends' wishes, to have the Winged Monkeys transport Tip and Mombi back to their distant home.

Before the group leaves Winkie-Land, the Winkies declare the Tin Man as their king. As they make their way back to the Emerald City they become lost in an enormous forest and struggle against a monstrous spider. The animals of the forest are thankful that the Lion defeated the Monster Spider and make him king to show their gratitude. Dorothy uses the Golden Cap to call the Winged Monkeys who then take her and her friends back to the Emerald City.

They return to the Emerald City to find the Wizard not only invisible but still unwilling to grant their wishes, asking them to return later. However Dorothy and her friends refuse to be turned away again and start to argue with the Wizard as Toto reveals the Wizard is actually a normal man. The Wizard reveals he is actually a traveling magician from Nebraska who was accidentally swept away to Oz in his hot air balloon, and decided to pretend to be a Wizard as it was only the fear of a powerful magician that stopped the two Wicked Witches from taking over the whole land. He soon realizes that Scarecrow, Tin Man and Lion already possess what they desire and gives them items that they believe grant their wishes (Scarecrow's head is filled with sawdust and nails, Tin Man is given a wooden heart and Lion is given colored water that he is told represents courage) but cannot think of how to get Dorothy home. Scarecrow hits upon the idea to use the Wizard's hot air balloon to get Dorothy back to Kansas, and the Wizard agrees saying he will go back with her having tired of life in Oz. Before he leaves, he makes Scarecrow the King of Oz however Toto escapes from Dorothy's arms to chase a mouse and they miss the balloon's launching.

Dorothy is devastated, but remembers she has the Golden Cap and can summon the Winged Monkeys and order them to take her home. Summoning them, Dorothy is told they cannot cross the boundaries of Oz and has wasted her last wish but it is suggested she visits Glinda, the Good Witch of the South. She decides to head there straight away, and despite already having had their wishes granted and kingdoms waiting for them to rule the Scarecrow, Tin Man and Lion decide to travel with her still and ensure that she gets home. On their way to see Glinda they encounter a fighting tree, and a country full of miniature living people and animals made entirely of china. They are then nearly crushed by a pack of Hammer-Heads, but are rescued by a group of gnomes who help them escape through a series of caves. They, at last, reach the palace of Glinda who agrees to see them.

Glinda, who is kind and caring, listens to Dorothy's stories of her adventures and tells her that she will be able to return home. Before she does so, she requests that the Golden Cap be turned over to her. Useless to her now, Dorothy happily agrees and Glinda tells her that she intends to use it to return Scarecrow, Tin Man and Lion to their respective kingdoms so they don't have to face the dangers they encountered travelling to her again. She then tells Dorothy that she has had the power to return home since her first day in Oz through the magic shoes, and by clicking the heels together three times they will do whatever she commands. Despite this new knowledge, Dorothy and her friends agree it was a good thing she didn't know as they would never have met each other. After bidding a tearful farewell to her Tin Man, Lion and Scarecrow (who tells Dorothy that he feels they will meet again), Dorothy tells the shoes to return her home and they do just that, lifting her into the sky. Landing in Kansas, she wakes up to see her farmhouse in the distance. There, she is reunited with Aunt Em and Uncle Henry.

=== The Marvelous Land of Oz (episodes 18 to 30) ===
The second story arc is an adaptation of the second Oz book, The Marvelous Land of Oz (1904). Aunt Em and Uncle Henry are nearly finished building their new farm-house (after the former one was taken away by the cyclone) when Toto and Dorothy suddenly appear. Dorothy tells them of her adventures in Oz, but even though they find it hard to believe her, they are delighted that she has returned home.

Dorothy searches for one of her magic shoes, which fell off on the journey home, but is unable to find it. Later, when the family goes shopping for supplies in town, a circus being prepared has Dorothy reunited with the Wizard of Oz. Eventually, Aunt Em finds the other shoe, and Dorothy eagerly and carelessly uses both shoes to return to Oz, leaving Toto and the shoes in Kansas, but also leaving Aunt Em and Uncle Henry believing her.

Dorothy arrives back to the Land of Oz and is reunited with Tip, who is making a pumpkin-man to scare Mombi. It works, but Mombi tries out the Come-Alive Powder, and Jack Pumpkinhead comes to life. Mombi, who mistakes Dorothy for a witch, schemes to steal her powers and turn her into stone, but the children and Jack escape, with Mombi chasing after them. Later, they come across a wooden saw horse and decide to bring it to life with the Come-Alive Powder they have stolen from Mombi. They run on ahead with Jack to Emerald City, where they are reunited with King Scarecrow of Oz.

Dorothy and Tip meet General Jijnur who, with her All-Girl Army, plans to overthrow King Scarecrow and become Queen of the Emerald City. After the Gate-Guardian is defeated by Jinjur's army, Dorothy and Tip warn Scarecrow of the Invasion, and the friends make their escape, just as Mombi arrives at Emerald City. As Mombi joins General Jinjur in her plot to overthrow Oz, the friends go on to the West (despite the Saw-Horse's broken leg accident) and ask the Tin Man for help. Mombi uses her magic to surround the friends with a field of Sunflowers, which thanks to Jinjur doesn't last long. The Mouse Queen is called upon to help her friends with their mission and gives them her Secret Weapon. After more magic tricks, like a giant cliff-like wall and a circle of fire, the friends finally return to Emerald City and find it in bad shape—all the men are doing the hard work while the women can do whatever they want. In the Throne Room Jinjur, Mombi and the Army surround Dorothy & her friends, but is no match for the Mouse Queen's Secret Weapon. Jinjur attempts to attack, while Scarecrow decides for them to escape using the Come-Alive Powder.

Jack uses the Wizard's old tricks to distract and scare the girls as his friends put together and bring to life a Moose-Bed (a canopy bed with a stuffed Moose head attached). Once everything is together, the friends narrowly escape and head off to Glinda in the South. But Mombi causes the Moose-Bed and his passengers to drift away into a valley of mist, mountains and cliffs, where they are encountered, captured and eventually manage to escape one of several giant dragons. They arrive at Glinda's castle and Glinda is aware of their dilemma. Although she is willing to help free the Emerald City of Mombi and Jinjur, Glinda informs the group she will not restore Scarecrow as king having recently discovered that his claim to the throne is illegal. She tells everyone that the King of Oz died just before the Wizard arrived and it was believed that he had left no heir to the throne, bringing to an end the royal lineage. However Glinda has discovered that he did father a child just before he died; a girl named Ozma who disappeared soon after as she was removed by the Wizard due to him not wishing to lose the power he had gained by becoming ruler. Watching through Glinda's crystal ball, the group learns that the Wizard left Ozma with none other than Mombi. Scarecrow is not upset about no longer being king, having quickly tired of the position and the group decides to return to the Emerald City (accompanied by Glinda) to oust Jinjur and find out from Mombi what she did with Ozma.

Upon returning to the Emerald City, Glinda frightens Jinjur and her army into surrendering and orders Mombi to cooperate with Dorothy and her group before leaving while the Gump and the Sawhorse are left at the gate. When Scarecrow arrives, he announces that Jinjur will soon no longer rule the city but he also renounces the throne, informing then all that Princess Ozma is alive and he intends to organize a search for her. However, with Glinda gone Jinjur and Mombi take back their intention to co-operate a try a "disguise" trick which does not last long—the friends look for Mombi throughout the palace and find Jinur and Mombi arguing with each other, breaking off their 'teamwork', only to have Mombi transform herself into a dragon. Glinda appears and chases after the escaping Mombi-Dragon and easily triumphs over her.

Using her magic, Glinda has Mombi reveal what she did to Ozma. Mombi reveals that, in order to prevent anyone from finding Ozma she used a magic spell to transform her into a boy. Everyone realized that Tip is really Ozma. Tip becomes scared at the thought, but everyone assures him that he is really Ozma and was meant to rule and will do a fine job of it. When Glinda offers Tip the choice to remain as he is or have Mombi's spell broken, Tip bravely agrees to breaking the spell and he transforms into Princess Ozma. Glinda the removes Mombi's powers and orders her and Jinjur to return to their homes and lead quiet lives which they both agree to. She then offers Dorothy, Scarecrow, Tinman and Jack a reward for their help. Tin Man asks to return to the West as does Scarecrow and will now live with Tin Man in his palace. Jack wishes to remain with Princess Ozma while Dorothy asks to return to Kansas. Glinda agrees and transports Dorothy, Scarecrow and Tin Man to their homes, and as she disappears Dorothy bids her old and new friends farewell and promises to see them again.

=== Ozma of Oz (episodes 31 to 41) ===
The third part of the series is an adaptation of the third Oz book, Ozma of Oz (1907). It starts with Uncle Henry, Aunt Em, Dorothy and Toto sleeping peacefully in their Kansas beds, but as Dorothy's Magic Shoes start glowing, causing the Shoes to transport Dorothy back to Oz, leaving Toto and her Magic Shoes in Kansas. She arrives in the Land of Ev, where a trio of Wheelers rudely wakes her up and accuses her of being a witch. Dorothy escapes the Wheelers, and finds a little mechanical robot called Tik-Tok which she winds up. She learns that Tik-Tok was on a secret mission, given to him by Princess Langwidere, to free the prince of Ev, but he got himself into trouble with the Wheelers. Then, rather than he protecting Dorothy, Dorothy defends Tik-Tok from the Wheelers and accompanied by him goes off to meet Princess Langwidere.

Langwidere locks Dorothy and Tik-Tok in the dungeon. As Dorothy and Tik-Tok ask Mr. Mouse to get help from Oz, Princess Langwidere greets Ozma, Scarecrow, Tin Man and Jack Pumpkin head. Mr. Mouse gets Lion to come to Ev and inform his friends of Dorothy's imprisonment. It is then suggested that while Ozma and Jack would return to Oz, Dorothy and Tik-Tok with the accompany of Dorothy's friends would go to Nomeland to rescue Princess Langwidere's brother, the Prince of Ev from the Nome King. The group crosses a dangerous Desert, which consists of a sandstorm, funny looking plants, a giant beetle and only one oasis in the entire sandy waste.

They come across giant bones and a ship. While the group decides to rest in the ship for the night, they meet Billina, a Talking Hen (who acts like a Rooster), who was once the Nome King's chicken. She tells them the way to Nomeland, before giving Tik-Tok an egg. On the way to Nomeland, the friends travel through rocky caverns where they encounter and manage to escape one of two Rock Giants and a Ruined City. They arrive at the Gateway which leads down into the Nome King's Underground Kingdom. After walking alongside a River of Flowing Lava, as well as crossing over it, they walk through an Ornament Hallway and meet the Nome King.

Knowing why they are here he tells them of his power and that if they would want to free the Prince, they would have to play his Guessing Ornament Game. After Tik-Tok mistakenly turns into an ornament first, Kaliko tricks the Lion, the Tin Man and the Scarecrow in their guesses, turning them into ornaments. Dorothy, however, tricks the two Nomes into revealing the Prince of Ev and restores her friends. But when they try to leave, they end up getting trapped where Nome King and Kaliko scare them with pouring giant-tubs of lava, until they see and are terrified by the egg which Tik-Tok has secretly hidden.

With the Prince of Ev, the group tries to leave, but the Nome King isn't going to make it easy for them—he tries to drown them in a river of lava and catapults them with giant boulders. When it is finally decided that they have to follow the underground river for the way out, the Nome King, Kaliko and the Nomes attack them again with flying boulders. Fortunately, this attack gives the friends an opening to escape. They thank Billina for her help, but then the ship and the surrounding sand begins to sink by the Nome King again, but once Lion saves Scarecrow from being lost they are all finally free and safe from the Nome King, despite his displeasure. The friends then decide that it is time to go home.

=== The Emerald City of Oz (episodes 42 to 52) ===
The fourth and final story arc of the series is an adaptation of the sixth Oz book, The Emerald City of Oz (1910). Continuing on directly from the last story arc, the Nome King is now planning his revenge. Meanwhile, Dorothy is still in Oz. She and Scarecrow has been busy chasing Ozma around the Emerald City, which takes them into a Secret Chamber. Even in the darkness, Ozma discovers a door which reveals to them the Heart of the Emerald City and the history of Oz, proving to Ozma that she must prepare a coronation to be Queen of Oz. Back at the underground kingdom of the Nomes, an Invasion specialist named Guph suggests that in order to conquer the Emerald City they must make a tunnel which will take them to the Emerald City. Along with Guph's Giant Dirt-Devouring Worm, the Nomes make the tunnel and pass underneath the 'Deadly' Desert.

In the meantime, Scarecrow discovers a small box in the Wizard's Chamber which transports Dorothy and Ozma into a world where they meet Miss Cuttenclip the Paper Queen and Mr. Fuddles the Puzzle Man who creates a door which returns the girls back to Oz. As everybody gets everything ready, Dorothy and Ozma practice her magic powers by making a Giant Paper Bird come to life, so that they can ride it in the sky whenever they wish. Knowing the Nomes' fear and weakness, Guph also enlists the help of the monstrous Growleywog to ensure their victory. Practicing for the Coronation, Ozma's magic reveals where to find the Fountain of the Water of Oblivion, an important part of the Coronation.

Growleywog emerges in the West and starts devouring areas of the country. The terrified Winkies tell their King the Tin Man of the monster, and Dorothy also learns of the news. As the Tin Man battles Growleywog, Dorothy borrows the Magic Bird and tries to solve the problem without ruining any plans for Ozma. Underground, the Worm's failed attempt to go any further unto the emerald city gets Guph and the Nome King into an argument.

Nome King and his Army attempts to charge Emerald City, but Scarecrow's wondering of where and looking for Dorothy forces them back into the tunnel. After Dorothy manages to find the Winkie Timsmith to help her rescue Tin Man from the Growleywog, Guph sneaks into the Emerald City, going along the many stairs and doors, only to lose his memory in the Palace. Dorothy meets a pleasant Guph the next morning and the Nome King is worried. Ozma's Coronation is a success—despite Dorothy's exhaustion—and afterwards Tin Man talks to Ozma, the Lion and the Scarecrow on how to deal with Growleywog, which at that time is rejoined by the Nomes.

That night, Growleywog leads the Nomes in invasion of the Emerald City. As the Tin Man thwarts some of the Nomes, Scarecrow tells Dorothy his plan for a rescue. The friends do their best in scaring and attacking the Nomes with eggs, while the Lion watches over Ozma in her room, but their attempts are foiled and all seems lost for Dorothy and Scarecrow, but a voice comforts Dorothy, promising that all will be well. The next morning everybody is imprisoned by the Nome King and Dorothy wakes up to find herself alone in the Emerald City with the Growleywog and Guph, who has regained his memory but still protects her. Ozma uses her magic to save her people and trick the Nome King and his followers into defeat. Back in Oz, Glinda appears and congratulates Ozma on a job well done as the Nomes, Growlewog and Worm return home. Dorothy tells Glinda she knows it was her voice she heard, and realizes it is time to go home. However she is not sad, as she knows that she will be able to return to Oz anytime she wants thanks to Ozma's magic. Dorothy bids goodbye to her friends promising to return soon, and is then sent back to Kansas where she reunites with Aunt Em, Uncle Henry and Toto.

== Comparison with the original stories ==
- The major change from the book in the second story arc was that the Woggle-Bug wasn't present, and Dorothy was incorporated into the story (she was not present in the original novel The Marvelous Land of Oz which that story arc is based upon). The other major change is that Glinda, who in the novel abhors transformations, transforms herself into an eagle to fight with Mombi, who has taken the form of a dragon (she became a gryphon in the novel, and was chased into the Deadly Desert by Glinda riding aboard the Saw-Horse). Another change is that unlike in the book, the Gump is mute and uses body language to communicate.
- Many scenarios from the third story arc were either loosely based on the original stories, moved around and even left out. The Nome King, designed as short and plump, is close to Baum/Neil's original book version, except for the fact that he, Kaliko and the Nomes all have tall pointy hats. While the book originally had an Iron Giant with a Hammer, this animated version has two Rock Giants. The Wheelers are changed from many mischievous well-dressed people with wheels-instead-of-hands-&-feet to 3 little hairy cave-like men wearing beanies that move around on stone wheels like unicycles, with short tempers and loud gruff voices. Instead of heads, Princess Langwidere changes her hats, which "match" her moods.
- Though still based on the books, the stories of the third and fourth arcs strayed heavily from their source material. Characters were renamed and bore no resemblance to how they appeared in the books (i.e. The Prince of Ev, Princess Langwidere, Lord Kaliko, The Growleywog, General Guph, the Giant Worm), or simply were not present at all. The plot was changed a lot too—the characters can freely walk across the Deadly Desert unharmed, and Billina does not even come from Kansas. The original books have the Nomes all illustrated fat bodies with skinny arms & legs, Guff looks like a small Chinese man with long whiskers and there is Growleywog, which was put instead of an army of tall skinny but strong malicious-looking men, which was designed as a big fat growling monster. A major plot theme from The Emerald City of Oz—Aunt Em and Uncle Henry coming to Oz—never happens at all. Dorothy also leaves Oz once again to go home to Kansas in the end.

== Characters ==
- Dorothy Gale: Dorothy is the main heroine of the series. She lives with her Uncle Henry and Aunt Em on a farm in Kansas. Dorothy travels to Oz in a cyclone where she makes many new friends and shows great bravery. Dorothy wishes to return home to Kansas, so as not to worry her uncle and aunt, from the first moment she arrives in Oz.
- Toto: Dorothy's small Cairn Terrier dog, who barks on whomever he sees. He was given to Dorothy by Uncle Henry as a present.
- Scarecrow: The Scarecrow used to stand in the middle of a large corn field in the Munchkin Country and was supposed to frighten the crows (but failed at this task), until he met in Dorothy on her way to the Emerald City. The "brainless" Scarecrow joins Dorothy on her journey in the hope that The Wizard will give him a brain. Even though he does not believe it yet, the Scarecrow already has a sharp brain full of brilliant ideas, and he proves this throughout the whole journey.
- Tin Man: Originally a human, the Wicked Witch of the East transformed him into a Tin Man made entirety out of tin. She also took his heart from him so that he would not be able to ever love again. Since he is made entirety from metal, the Tin Man gets rusty quickly when in contact with water. One day, whilst chopping down trees in the forest it started to rain, and he was stuck in middle of the forest for more than a whole year until Dorothy and the Scarecrow met him by coincidence and helped him out. The "heart-less" Tin Man wants to be able to love again and therefore joins Dorothy on her journey in the hope that The Wizard will give him a heart. Soon becomes Ruler of the Winkies after the Wicked Witch of the West is melted.
- Cowardly Lion: The lion previously lived in the large forest situated in Munchkin Country. The Cowardly Lion was always cowardly, fearing everything. The Cowardly Lion joins the gang on the journey to the Emerald City in the hope that The Wizard will give him some courage. Even though he doesn't know it, throughout the journey the Cowardly Lion proves to be very brave and courageous, and all he needed was to boost his self-confidence.
- Tip / Princess Ozma: The little mischievous boy Tip was first introduced in an episode of the first story arc, and played a prominent role in the second, accompanying Dorothy on her second adventure in Oz. At the end of The Marvelous Land of Oz, he was actually Princess Ozma, heir to the throne of Oz. When the previous King of Oz disappeared, the Wizard of Oz became the caregiver of his daughter, Princess Ozma. The wizard wanted to rule the Emerald City without any disturbances, so he gave the Princess Ozma to Mombi who had always wanted children of her own. Mombi pitied the little baby and did not want the princess to suffer from growing up with her, and therefore transformed her into a baby boy and named her Tip. Dorothy met Tip for the first time at Mombi's. Tip was very connected to Mombi—he knows that under the scary exterior hides a warm, loving, humane mother who gave him a warm home and love throughout all the years. The gang went to Mombi because they were trying to figure out what happened to Princess Ozma, since they wanted to her, as the true ruler of the Oz's Throne, to become the ruler of the Emerald City. After investigating Mombi, she tells them her biggest secret, which had she sworn never to tell—Tip is actually Princess Ozma. Glinda removes the spell that was cast upon Princess Ozma, and she becomes the new ruler of Oz. Princess Ozma is very mischievous, and is somewhat of a tomboy—she likes to climb on trees and play soccer. She thinks Dorothy is much more worthy of being the ruler of Oz than her. Princess Ozma is considered to be a good ruler by the citizens of Oz and is very popular.
- Jack Pumpkinhead: Jack Pumpkinhead was introduced in The Marvelous Land of Oz, and was created by Tip as a way of scaring Mombi. Jack was brought to life with the Powder of Life.
- The Sawhorse: The Sawhorse was also introduced in The Marvelous Land of Oz, and brought to life using the Powder of Life. He accompanies Dorothy, Tip and Jack on their journey to the Emerald City to see the Scarecrow.
- The Gump: The Gump was also introduced in The Marvelous Land of Oz, and brought to life using the Powder of Life. He doesn't talk, but he can understand his friends and he is able to fly, thanks to the craftsmanship of Dorothy and her crew.
- Billina: Billina is a chicken introduced in Ozma of Oz, when she is inhabiting a ship in the desert. Billina plays an important role in the escape of Dorothy and her friends by giving them one of her eggs—unbeknownst to her, eggs are poisonous to Nomes. She takes a liking to Tik-Tok.
- Tik-Tok: Tik-Tok is a mechanic robot that plays a prominent role in Ozma of Oz. He was previously the best friend of the Prince of Ev, and meets Dorothy during her first encounter with the Wheelers in the Land of Ev. Tik-tok joins Dorothy and Co on their journey into the Nome King's kingdom to find the Prince of Ev.
- Paper Bird: A big origami bird brought to life by Ozma.

=== Allies ===
- Uncle Henry and Aunt Em: The sister of Dorothy's mother, Aunt Em adopted Dorothy, after her mother's death. While Uncle Henry works on the farm to provide the family, Aunt Em works at home and takes care of the farm's animals and of Dorothy. Later, when Dorothy returns home to Kansas with the help of her magic shoes, Aunt Em and Uncle Henry refuse to believe Dorothy's tales of her adventures in Oz, dismissing them as hallucinations.
- Good Witch of the North: The Good Witch of the North appears in the first episodes of the show, when Dorothy arrives for the first time in Oz, mistakenly killing the Wicked Witch of the East, so the Good Witch of the North comes to thank her. She is very clumsy and confused all of the time—she is actually convinced that Dorothy is a good witch herself, who has come a long distance in order to help the nation munchkins that was suffering from the evil witch's rulership. The Good Witch of the North rules the northern country and had great powers in the past, but nowadays her powers have weakened. She is not able to help Dorothy return home and she never heard of Kansas, therefore she sends Dorothy to the great Wizard of Oz who lives in the Emerald City to help her get back home. She gives Dorothy a basket of food, the shoes of the Wicked Witch of the East, and her famous signature kiss. The Good Witch of the North is known for her powers of healing. She has the ability to easily cure every sick person and to prevent diseases with the help of her magic powers. She also has the ability to give a protective kiss—which turns whoever receives it to be protected from all bad. Dorothy receives the kiss in the second episode, and since then no one can hurt her, even though many villains try throughout the series—they all fail due to the powerful kiss.
- Munchkins
- Guardian of the Gates
- The Wizard of Oz: The Wizard lives in the Emerald City and was reputed to have the biggest and greatest magic powers in all of Oz. All the inhabitants of Oz fear him and his powers. He is the ruler of the Emerald City, the capital of Oz, and from there he controls the entire country. No-one has ever seen his face. When Dorothy and her friends arrive the Emerald City, they are able to meet with the Wizard due to the a kiss that the Good Witch from the North gave Dorothy. The Wizard promises to fulfill their requests on condition that they kill the Witch of the West. The courageous gang manage to kill the Wicked Witch of the West, endangering their own lives the process. When they return to the Wizard, he is not interested in seeing them and tries to postpone meeting them. When they gang bursts into the big hall, they find out that he is just a man that has been deceiving everyone with tricks. He was the announcer in a circus and worked in a Hot air balloon, until one day the rope which was holding the balloon loosened up and the balloon carried him all the way to Oz. The people of the Emerald City thought that he was a great wizard because he came down from the skies—and he let them believe it. Unfortunately the Wizard is not able to help Dorothy return to Kansas. Dorothy meets the Wizard again in Kansas, before she returns to Oz for the second time. It is later revealed that after the King of Oz died the Wizard removed Princess Ozma, his only heir, and turned her over to Mombi so he wouldn't lose the power he had gained.
- Glinda the Good Witch of the South: Glinda features throughout the whole series. Initially, Dorothy and her friends travel to Glinda so that she can help Dorothy return to Kansas. Glinda instructs Dorothy on how to use her magic shoes to return to Kansas, and makes Scarecrow the King of Oz, Tin Man the ruler of the Winkies and Lion the king of the forest. Glinda also plays a role in the later story arcs, helping to transform Tip into Ozma.
- Queen of the Field Mice: The Queen first met the gang whilst they were passing through the deadly poppy field, which puts Dorothy, Toto and Lion into a deep sleep. The Scarecrow and the Tin Man are immune, and are in the process of dragging them out of the field when they see the queen of the Field Mice being chased by a big cat. The Tin Man, helps her and rescues her immediately from the cat. The queen, owing her life to the gang, asks them if there is anything that she and the field mice could to do for them in return. With the mice's help, Dorothy, Lion and Toto are taken out of the poppy field. Since that incident, the gang became good friends with the Queen of the Field Mice, and the Field Mice help the gang from time to time throughout the series.
- The Prince of Ev: The Prince of Ev is the descendant to a dynasty of kings who used to rule Oz. The prince grew up with Tik-tok, a robot built especially for him. The prince grew up, and enjoyed exploring the kingdom and its neighboring kingdoms over the years, until one day, on one of his tours with Tik-tok in the desert, the prince disappeared without leaving a trace. Tik-tok returned to the royal palace to inform his parents, hoping they would obtain their boy. With time it became clear that the Nome King kidnapped him. The prince bothered the Nome King, because prince was tall, a fact which irritated the king. Therefore, the Nome King kidnapped the Prince of Ev and cast a spell over him that would prevent him from growing any more. The Prince of Ev's parents became very sad. With their son was gone, their lives was filled with great sorrow and they did not want to rule the country any more—so they dismissed themselves of the kingship. Their daughter, Princess Langwidere, became the ruler of Ev. Dorothy and her gang, on a mission from Ozma, eventually find out that the prince was transformed into an iron sculpture by the Nome King. The King agrees to free the prince from the spell only if they enter one-by-one into a room full of iron sculptures, and each guess which of the sculptures is the prince of Ev, and touch it. Whomever would failed to find him would also transform into an iron sculpture.

=== Villains ===
- Wicked Witch of the East: The Wicked Witch of the West's sister who Dorothy crushed with her house at the beginning of the show. Dorothy 'inherits' the witch's magical shoes.
- Wicked Witch of the West: Hated in all of Oz, the Wicked Witch of the West has conquered all of the western part of Oz, ruling it and transforming all of the inhabitants into her slaves. She has magical powers even stronger than Glinda's, and frightens the Wizard of Oz, inspiring him to get rid of her. He sends Dorothy, the Scarecrow, the Tin Man the Cowardly Lion to destroy her. The witch is forcing the Winkies to build a new fortress for her which she will use to conquer Oz. She seeing the gang of four coming in a magic mirror and sends out wolves, crows and an Army of her Winkie Soldiers out to attack them—but Dorothy's friends are easily able to beat them. The witch acts cruelly to those who try to rebel her and those dare to disobey her, she transforms into a sculpture of stone. When she notices Dorothy's shoes, the witch realises that she would be able to gain back all of the powers that she had lost by the means of the formidable shoes, and conspires to steal them. No one has knowledge of the witch's weakness—she would dissolve in water. The Witch uses her last command of the Golden Cap to call the Winged Monkeys, who manage to take apart the Scarecrow and Tin Man, capturing the Lion (who she wants to harness to her carriage). Dorothy and Toto are also spared, thanks to the Good Witch's kiss, and the monkeys bring her to the witch's fortress where Dorothy is forced to be the Witch's slave. The witch claims that her powers are much stronger than the Good Witch of the North, and therefore the Good Witch's kiss is insignificant to her. However, the truth is that the witch is petrified of the combination of the good witch's kiss and Dorothy's shoes. Dorothy and the lion eventually manage to escape and hide from the witch. When the witch discovers their hide out, she gets very angry and turns the lion into a stone sculpture and threatens Dorothy and Toto that she will turn them into stone too if Dorothy does not hand over her shoes. The witch almost ends up burning Toto with her witchcraft, and so Dorothy surrenders and gives the witch one shoe, promising to give the other after she would frees Toto from the flames. Toto jumps into a large vat of water, and splashes water on the Wicked Witch of the West, melting her.
- Winged Monkeys: The Winged Monkeys are introduced in the first quarter of the series, when the Wicked Witch of the West uses the Golden Cap to call them to destroy Scarecrow, Tin Man, Dorothy and Toto, and to bring the Lion back to her palace. After Dorothy destroys the Wicked Witch of the West, she takes the Golden Cap. She uses the Golden Cap three times. She then gives the Golden Cap to Glinda the Good Witch of the South, who uses the Winged Monkeys to return Scarecrow, Tin Man and Lion to their new homes. The Winged Monkeys do not feature in the subsequent three quarters of the series.
- Hammerheads: Mean armless creatures with hard, flat heads who come out the ground like worms. They do not allow anyone in their land and never even apologize for their harmful actions.
- Mombi: Mombi is a witch took care of Princess Ozma, after changing her into a boy named Tip.
- General Jinjur: General Jinjur and her four woman army staged a revolt against, and temporarily took control of, the Emerald City in the second story arc.
- Princess Lulu: The Prince of Ev's sister, and the current ruler of Ev. She possesses many different hats, which will change her mood depending on which one is wearing. Princess Lulu requested from Princess Ozma to help find her brother—the throne of the kingdom does not interest her and she only wants the Prince of Ev to return and become the ruler of the country. Princess Ozma sends the Tin man, the Scarecrow, Dorothy, the Lion and Tik-tok on an expedition in the land of Ev to find the Prince of Ev. Known as Langwidere in the book.
- Wheelers: Small hairy people who move on wheels, seen first in a group of three. There are very mean when they meet Dorothy. Tik-Tok is after one of their hats, they don't like him either so Dorothy protects him from the Wheelers and forces them to leave.
- Nomes: The Nomes are immortal rock fairies who dwell underground. They hide jewels and precious metals in the earth, and resent the "upstairs people" who dig down for those valuables.
  - The Nome King: The Nome King is the ruler of the Nome kingdom, located in the Deadly Desert. He has tried to conquer all of Oz before to gain control of the Emerald City—but has thus far failed due to the warm climate of the desert, and the strong sun light which exhausted all of the Nomes. The Nome King is of very short stature, and tries to make up for it by proving to everyone how big of a ruler he is—he dried out the whole sea until there was only a big desert left (because it made him feel small), and he kidnapped the Prince of Ev. After Dorothy and her friends rescue the prince from the Nome King in Ozma of Oz, the King is enraged and plots his revenge by conquering Oz and ruling the Emerald City of Oz with the help of General Guph and a Giant Worm (in The Emerald City of Oz). The nomes use the worm to dig a tunnel under the Deadly Desert towards the Emerald City.
  - Lord Kaliko: Lord Kaliko is the Nome King's 'sidekick', often offering advice to the King.
  - General Guph: The General of the Nome Army. He has a giant worm that can eat rock but not iron, and secretly planned to overthrow the Nome King after they conquered the Emerald City. Among the first to drink the water from the Fountain of Oblivion.
- The Growleywog: The Growleywog joins the Nomes in their attempt to conquer the Land of Oz. According to Guph, he likes eggs. Fought the Tinman in the Winkie Country and managed to get him rusted.

== Voice actors ==
Character	Japanese voice	Canadian voice
Dorothy	Sumi Shimamoto	Morgan Hallett
Scarecrow	Yoshito Yasuhara	Richard Dumont
Tin Man	Takuzō Kamiyama	George Morris
Cowardly Lion	Ichirō Nagai	Neil Shee
Glinda the Good Witch of the South	Aiko Konoshima	Barbara Poggemiller
Uncle Henry	Eisuke Yoda	Walter Massey
Aunt Em	Haruko Kitahama	Bronwen Mantel
The Wizard of Oz	Seizō Katō; Mari Yokoo; Toshiya Ueda; Mahito Tsujimura; Tadao Futami	Vlasta Vrána
Good Witch of the North	Mitsuko Tomobe	Bronwen Mantel
Toto		
Queen of the Field Mice	Fumi Hirano	Jane Woods
The Prince of Ev	Eiko Yamada	
Princess Langwidere	Yoko Asagami	Bronwen Mantel
Tip / Princess Ozma	Masako Nozawa	Steven Bednarski
Jack Pumpkinhead	Kazuyo Aoki	Adrian Knight
The Sawhorse	Akio Nojima	
The Gump		
Tik-Tok	Yūji Mitsuya	A.J. Henderson
Lord Kaliko	Tamio Ohki	Arthur Grosser
Billina	Rihoko Yoshida	Kathleen Fee
Wicked Witch of the West	Hisako Kyōda	Bronwen Mantel
Wicked Witch of the East	Masako Nozawa	Bronwen Mantel
Head Winged Monkey	Shingo Kanemoto	Arthur Grosser
Mombi	Chie Kitagawa	Kathleen Fee
The Growleywog		
General Guph	Joji Yanami	Dean Hagopian
Giant Worm		
General Jinjur	Runa Akiyama	Jane Woods
The Nome King	Osamu Saka	Rob Roy

== Music scores ==
=== Japanese ===
The music score is by K.S. Yoshimura and Takao Naoi. The opening song is called "Fanshii Gaaru (ファンシーガール lit. Fancy Girl)" and is sung by Satoko Yamano. Yamano also sang the opening theme for Maple Town which came out the same here.

The ending song is called "Mahō no Kureyon (魔法のクレヨン lit. Magical Crayon)", and is sung by the Japanese vocalists Kumiko Ōsugi and Ema Ōsugi. An excerpt of instrumental music from the series has been used as an opening theme by a few of the other international dubs, such as the Polish and Hebrew ones.

=== North American version ===
The North American version features an entirely new score, composed and arranged by Hagood Hardy, Tom Szczesniak & Ray Parker. It changes the opening of the original Japanese animation into an original CGI opening.

The English dub uses one piece of theme music for the episodic format, and four pieces of theme music for the highly edited movie format. The first song, "Searching for a Dream", is used for the 52 episode TV version and first film. The second opening song is "Listen to You Heart", used for the second film arc. The third song is "Taste the Rain", used for the third film release, and the fourth is "Close Your Eyes", which is used for the final film release. All songs were created and performed by musical group, The Parachute Club. The ending song is a shortened version of "Searching For a Dream", which plays while showcasing clips from the series.

The French dub, being based on the English dub, retains the changed score, while replacing the main theme with an original song, "Emporte-moi dans ton rêve". This theme is used for both the original 52 episode TV version, and all four highly-condensed films.

== Episodes ==
Number	English broadcast title	Japanese translated title
1	Dorothy Meets the Munchkins	Dorothy and the Tornado
2	Dorothy Finds a Friend	Yellow Road
3	Adventures Along the Yellow Brick Road	Departure to Hope
4	The Journey to Emerald City	The Difficult Road
5	Saved by the Mouse Queen	Black Flower
6	The Emerald City at Last	Emerald Palace
7	The Wizard Wants a Favor	Witch of the West
8	The Wicked Witch of the West	Winky's Battle
9	Dorothy's Magic Powers	Witch's Castle
10	Freedom from the Witch	After the Shoes
11	Mombi, Tip and the Golden Cap	Mombi And Tip
12	Back to the Emerald City	New King
13	The Wizard's Disappointing Secret	Identity of the Great King of Oz
14	The Wizard Tries to Help	Left Behind
15	Journey to the South	To the South
16	Glinda, the Good Witch	Witch Glinda's Castle
17	Home Sweet Home Again	Glinda
18	Dorothy Meets the Wizard, Again	Kansas
19	Back to Oz	Back to Oz
20	Escape from Mombi	Tip Is a Father
21	General Jinjur Attacks	General Ginger
22	Escape from the Emerald City	Scarecrow King Runs Away
23	Tinman to the Rescue	The Woodcutter's a King
24	Mombi's Terrible Magic	Mombi's Magic
25	Trapped in the Palace	Join Strength
26	The Magical Escape	Gump
27	Glinda Agrees to Help	Seeking Help
28	The Emerald City, Captured	Back to Emerald
29	Mombi's Attempt to Trick Glinda	Mombi the Witch?
30	Ozma, Princess of Oz	Tip's Secret
31	Tik Tok, The Mechanical Man	Dorothy and Tick-Tock
32	The Kidnapped Prince	Castle Langdia
33	The Deadly Desert	Desert Journey
34	The Talking Hen	Hen of the Desert
35	Monsters of Stone	Edge of Oz
36	The Underground Country of Nomes	Gnome of the Underworld
37	The Deadly Guessing Game	The King's Problem
38	Dorothy Outsmarts the King	The King's Favorite Thing
39	The Secret Fear of the Nomes	Scary Room
40	The Nome King Sets a Trap	In Search of the Light
41	Saved by the Sun	Back to the Surface
42	The Nome King Plans Revenge	The Gnome's Counterattack
43	Princess Ozma's Secret	Secret Of Emerald
44	Miss Cuttenclip and Mister Fuddle	Land Of Chokkinpet
45	The Growleywog Joins the Nomes	Harvest in Oz
46	The Water of Oblivion	Spring of Forgetfulness
47	Nomes on the March	Bakekubi Goes On a Rampage
48	A Winky Helps His King	Guff Becomes a Good Person
49	The Crowning of Ozma	Coronation
50	The Nomes Attack	Victory of the Gnome King
51	Dorothy and Her Friends Defend the Palace	Dorothy Keeps Fighting
52	A Very Happy Ending	Back to Kansas

== International releases ==
In 1987, HBO purchased the rights to the series and dubbed it into English. Production for the English version was done by the Montreal-based studio Cinar (now WildBrain). Actress Margot Kidder was hired as narrator, and a new score was produced by composers Hagood Hardy, Tom Szczesniak & Ray Parker, with the musical band The Parachute Club providing vocal songs for the series.

This version attempted to completely occlude the show's Japanese origins, going so far as to remove all Japanese names and studios from the credits and to credit key aspects of the animation to Westerners, which applied primarily to the CGI opening sequence.

To give it a secondary market, episodes of the show were later re-edited into four films and released on VHS and Laserdisc (and later DVD), in which major plots and storylines are removed in favour of cutting each story-arc down into their respective book-canon story.

The series aired in the U.S. both in its original weekly episodic form and in its later four-part condensed miniseries.

In 2004, the Latin American publisher Distrimax bought the rights to the four heavily edited resume movies and re-dubbed them, being titled "El magnífico mago de Oz", "El maravilloso mundo de Oz", "Ozma de Oz", and "La ciudad Esmeralda de Oz".

An Indonesian version was broadcast by Spacetoon in 2009.

Discotek Media released the English-language version of the series on SD Blu-ray and DVD for North America on August 29, 2017. They have also released the original Japanese-language version of series on SD Blu-ray on June 25, 2019.

It has also been reported to be seen early-morning on This TV's Cinar children's Wildbrain programming block Cookie Jar Toons, which has since dissolved due to the breakup of the two companies. All 52 episodes were at one time available for instant streaming on Netflix.ca. The show aired in Australia and the United Kingdom several times in the early 1990s in the full episodic format on the ABC, Channel 4 and ITV channels respectively. It also aired around the same time in India on the Doordarshan channel. The full original Japanese version is available for purchase at YesAsia. In Mexico, IC Group have released the first 26 episodes in a collection of four DVDs under the name of El Mago de Oz. A series of French-dubbed DVD sets of the whole series are available in France.
