= The Wizard of Oz (1982 film) =

1982 anime film directed by Fumihiko Takayama

The Wizard of Oz オズの魔法使い
- Japanese videotape cover

Japanese name
- Kanji: オズの魔法使い
Transcriptions
- Revised Hepburn: Ozunomahōtsukai
- Directed by: Fumihiko Takayama
- Written by: Akira Miyazaki
- Starring: Mari Okamoto; Kazuo Kumakura
- Edited by: Nobuo Ogawa
- Music by: Joe Hisaishi; Yuichiro Oda
- Production companies: Toho; Topcraft Limited Company; Wiz Corporation
- Distributed by: Toho
- Release date: July 1, 1982
- Running time: 78 minutes
- Country: Japan
- Language: Japanese

The Wizard of Oz (オズの魔法使い, Ozu no Mahōtsukai) is a 1982 anime feature film directed by Fumihiko Takayama, from a screenplay by Akira Miyazaki, which is based on the 1900 children's novel by L. Frank Baum, with Yoshimitsu Banno and Katsumi Ueno as executive producers for Toho.

== Plot ==
A little girl named Dorothy Gale lives with her Aunt Em, Uncle Henry and dog Toto on their farm in Kansas. One day when Aunt Em and Uncle Henry are away, a tornado throws their house into the air. Dorothy and Toto end up in the magical Land of Oz, where they are welcomed by the Good Witch of the North and the Munchkins. The Witch explains to her that her house fell upon the Wicked Witch of the East, freeing the Munchkins from her tyranny. She gives Dorothy the ruby red slippers of the Wicked Witch, but the girl just wants to go home. After consulting her magic blackboard, the Witch tells Dorothy to go to the great Wizard of Oz in the Emerald City, hoping that he can grant her wish. Before leaving her, she advises her to never leave the yellow brick road and leaves her protective mark on her forehead with a kiss.

During the journey Dorothy meets: a brainless Scarecrow, a rusty Tin Woodman who longs for a heart and a Cowardly Lion. Dorothy agrees to take the three to the Wizard so that he can solve their problems too. Halfway they are attacked by a Kalidah, a creature half tiger and half bear, but they manage to defeat him. After crossing a river on a raft, the four finally arrive to the Emerald City, where the Wizard calls them separately. He appears first to Dorothy in the form of a large talking head, then to the Scarecrow as a beautiful winged lady, to the Tinman as a monster similar to a rhinoceros, and to the Cowardly Lion as a ball of fire. He agrees to grant them their requests, but on the condition that they defeat the Wicked Witch of the West.

The group then heads west, where the Witch has already learned of their arrival from her crystal ball. The Witch tries to stop them by sending a pack of wolves against them, who are promptly defeated by the Tinman. The Witch then sends a flock of crows who take the form of a monstrous giant crow, but this time they are saved by the Scarecrow's cunning. The Witch sends to them her army of Winged Monkeys, who manage to capture the group, but without harming Dorothy, as she is protected by the mark of the Witch of the North. The Witch tries to steal the ruby slippers from Dorothy, who during a fight throws a jug of water on her, which makes her shrink and disappear forever.

The Winkies are finally free from the Witch's slavery and the group of friends returns to the city. Here they discover that the Wizard was actually a humbug. The man explains that he worked as a magician in a circus and one day he got lost with his hot air balloon, ending in the Land of Oz. After persuading Dorothy's friends that they already have what they were looking for, he offers to take Dorothy back to Kansas with her balloon, but due to an inconvenience she and Toto can't get on the balloon. Dorothy has lost all hope of seeing Aunt Em and Uncle Henry again when she receives a visit from Glinda, the Good Witch of the South. Glinda reveals that since her arrival in Oz she has always had the power to return to Kansas with the magic ruby slippers. Dorothy says goodbye to her friends, clicks the heels of her shoes three times and is transported at home with Toto, where they are reunited with Aunt Em and Uncle Henry.

== Cast ==
The four main characters

Character	Japanese	English
Dorothy Gale	Mari Okamoto	Aileen Quinn
The Wizard	Kazuo Kumakura; Seri Machika (as the Beautiful-Winged Lady)	Lorne Greene
Scarecrow	Kotobuki Hizuru	Billy Van
Tin Woodman	Jōji Yanami	John Stocker
Cowardly Lion	Masashi Amenomori	Thick Wilson
Omby Amby	Motomu Kiyokawa	Thick Wilson
The Good Witch of the North	Miyoko Asō	Elizabeth Hanna
The Wicked Witch of the West	Kaori Kishi	Elizabeth Hanna
Glinda, the Good Witch of the South	Kumiko Takizawa	Wendy Thatcher
Aunt Em	Taeko Nakanishi	Unknown
Jellia Jamb	Taeko Nakanishi	Elizabeth Hanna
Uncle Henry	Naoki Tatsuta	Unknown
Toto	Shohei Matsubara	Unknown
Monkey King	Toshiyuki Yamamoto	Unknown

== Production ==
The film was produced in 1981 and it was the first animated feature in which Toho participated in the production. It is notable for its Western character design, unusual in anime. In fact, Topcraft used to work for American animation studio Rankin/Bass at the time. Dorothy's design is therefore derived from That Girl in Wonderland episode of The ABC Saturday Superstar Movie, also animated by Topcraft, in which in a sequence Ann Marie imagines herself as Dorothy. Voice actress Mari Okamoto had already voiced Dorothy in the 1974 TBS dub of the 1939 The Wizard of Oz. This film's writer, Akira Miyazaki, also wrote for the 1986 anime television series of the same name.

=== Relation to the novel ===
The film is known for staying particularly close to the novel, its primary elimination being the journey to Glinda, which is only now slightly less of a deus ex machina than in the MGM version. Also borrowed from that version are the red "magic shoes" rather than the silver shoes of Baum's text. Some familiarity with the later books is clear, as the houses are the same two-chimneyed domes found in the artwork of John R. Neill, who never illustrated the first Oz book. Glinda's appearance is also borrowed from Neill's illustrations of Princess Ozma. It is one of the rare films to depict the various forms the Wizard appears to each of the travelers, such as the Beautiful-Winged Lady (shown to be a puppet rather than the Wizard in a costume, as in the book), the Terrible Beast (looking like an ordinary rhinoceros) and the Ball of Fire.

== Music ==
The music was written by future Studio Ghibli's composer Jō Hisaishi along with Yuichiro Oda and performed by Columbia Orchestra. The Lyrics were written by Keisuke Yamakawa. The single containing the songs was released in April 1981 (Catalog# CK-584).

1. "Someone is waiting for me" (だれか私を待っている, Dare ka watashi wo matte iru) (Main theme) (Singer: Mitsuko Horie)
2. "What is 1+1?" (1+1は何？, Ichi tasu ichi wa nani) (Insert song) (Singers: Mitsuko Horie and Koorogi '73)

A third song also sung by Horie can be heard in the middle of the film, but it remained untilted never having been released on record.

The English dubbed version featured new different lyrics by Sammy Cahn and Allen Byrns, all sung by Aileen Quinn.

1. "It's Strictly Up to You" (Main theme)
2. "I Dream of Home"
3. "A Wizard of a Day"

== Release and home media ==
Although it was produced for a theatrical release, the film was eventually released in Japan straight to VHS, Betamax on July 1, 1982. It was also broadcast on AT-X as early as December 19, 2002. The English version of this film, edited by Johann Lowenberg and produced by John Danylkiw, appeared on television and home video in the United States on September 10, 1983. Alan L. Gleitsman was the executive producer of Alan Enterprises, which did the English dub for the North American release. New Hope Entertainment was also involved in producing the English-dubbed version. It was distributed in English-speaking countries and territories, including the United States and Canada, by Alan Enterprises. Paramount Home Video released the English dubbed version on VHS, Betamax, Laserdisc, and CED in 1983 and on VHS in 1991.

However, the film was shown in cinemas in some countries in the 1980s, such as Czechoslovakia and Spain or in Latin America. The film was dubbed into the Czech and Slovak language except for the songs, which were performed by Japanese singers (from the original Japanese music version). Some other foreign dubs, such as the Italian, Spanish and Greek versions, had this premise edit as well, while the French, Dutch and Hungarian dubs had their own rendition of the songs.

Except for a Polish Japanese-language DVD the movie never got an official DVD release in any other country.

== See also ==
- The Wonderful Wizard of Oz, a 1986 Japanese anime adaptation of Oz
- The Wizard of Oz adaptations — other adaptations of The Wonderful Wizard of Oz
- List of films about witchcraft
