= Witch of the South =

- Glinda the Good Witch is known as the Good Witch of the South
- the Wicked Witch of the South is the previous ruler she supplanted
