= Denise Bryer =

British actress (1928–2021)

- Bryer in 2014
- Born: 5 January 1928; Kensington, London, England
- Died: 16 October 2021 (aged 93)
- Occupation: Actress
- Years active: 1946–2021
- Spouse: Nicholas Parsons (m. 1954; div. 1989)
- Children: 2

Denise Bryer (5 January 1928 – 16 October 2021) was an English actress, known for her voice roles on television and radio.

== Career ==
Bryer was born 5 January 1928 in Kensington, London to Claude and Susie (née Mott) Bryer. Her father was a jeweller and her mother a former actress. She was the youngest of seven children. Her eldest sister, Vera, was also an actor and dancer.

Denise Bryer made her motion picture debut in 1937 in A Romance in Flanders.

Evacuated to Buckinghamshire during World War II, she attended school there before returning to London after the war. She subsequently studied acting at the Royal Academy of Dramatic Art. Bryer resumed her acting career on the radio in 1947.

Best remembered in her homeland for her work on the Gerry Anderson series, Terrahawks, where she voiced both the main villain Zelda and the heroic Capt. Mary Falconer, Bryer became well known in the United States when she voiced Billina in Disney's 1985 film Return to Oz, as well as The Junk Lady in the 1986 movie Labyrinth, and many other films. In addition to her work voice acting in film and television, she worked extensively on UK radio and children's recordings.

Bryer first came to public attention when she voiced Footso in The Adventures of Twizzle and would go on to voice in Anderson's later series Four Feather Falls as Ma Jones and Little Jake. She also voiced Kiki The Frog in Hector's House and Noddy on the eponymous television show between 1955 till 1969 alongside commercials for Kellogg's Ricicles and audio adaptations. She dubbed the voice of Commander Makara in the Japanese puppet series Star Fleet around the same time as Terrahawks. In Big Finish's Doctor Who audio dramas The Reaping and The Gathering, she provided the voice of Dominique Van Gyseghem.

=== Radio ===
Bryer featured in Eurydice, a 1951 BBC Radio adaptation of a play by Jean Anouilh. The cast included Paul Scofield and Sebastian Cabot.

In 1954, she appeared in Zuleika Dobson by Max Beerbohm, aired on the BBC Third Programme, with Michael Hordern.

=== Recordings ===
Bryer also starred in or narrated several of the stories in the Tale Spinners for Children series of record albums released beginning in 1960. She also was a narrator of the Marshall Cavendish partwork Storyteller I and II as well as the little StoryTeller series.

== Personal life ==
Bryer married actor/presenter Nicholas Parsons in 1954; together they had two children, interior designer son Justin and daughter Suzy. Bryer and Parsons divorced in 1989 after thirty five years of marriage but remained on friendly terms.

Bryer died on 16 October 2021, at the age of 93.

== Filmography ==
=== Film and television ===
- Junior Miss (1946) - Lois Graves
- Noddy (1955–1969) - Noddy (voice)
- Here Comes Kandy (1956) - Additional voices
- The Adventures of Twizzle (1957–1958) - Footso, Additional voices
- Four Feather Falls (1960) - Martha Jones, Makooya the Little India Boy, Additional voices
- Maigret (1963) - Child's Voice
- Hector's House (1968–1970) - Kiki the Frog, a.k.a. Mrs. Frog (voice)
- Gulliver's Travels (1977) - Additional voices
- Star Fleet (1980–1982) - Commander Makara (voice)
- Hercules (1983) - Circe (voice; uncredited)
- Terrahawks (1983–1986) - Mary Falconer, Zelda
- Return to Oz (1985) - Billina (voice)
- Labyrinth (1986) - The Junk Lady (voice)
- G-Force Intergalactic (1993) - Dr. Julie Sigmund
- Reflections in the Mirror (2018) - Billina (voice)

=== Radio ===
- Eurydice (1951)
- Zuleika Dobson (1954)
- Wimsey - Unnatural Death (1975)

=== Narrator ===
- Tale Spinners for Children series (1960s)
