= Gulliver's Travels (1977 film) =

1977 film by Peter R. Hunt

- Film poster
- Directed by: Peter R. Hunt
- Written by: Don Black
- Based on: Gulliver's Travels by Jonathan Swift
- Produced by: Derek Horne; Raymond Leblanc; Josef Shaftel (executive)
- Starring: Richard Harris; Catherine Schell; Norman Shelley; Meredith Edwards
- Cinematography: Alan Hume
- Edited by: Ron Pope
- Music by: Michel Legrand
- Production company: Valeness-Belvision
- Distributed by: EMI Film Distributors (United Kingdom)
- Release date: 6 May 1977
- Running time: 80 minutes
- Countries: United Kingdom; Belgium
- Language: English

Gulliver's Travels is a 1977 film based on the 1726 novel of the same name by Jonathan Swift. It mixed live action and animation, and starred Richard Harris in the title role.

== Plot ==
The opening sequence in live action shows Gulliver announcing his intention to go to sea as a ship's surgeon, followed by scenes of a shipwreck. The remainder of the film has Harris on Lilliput and Blefuscu; with the tiny inhabitants created by animation and themed on Medieval West and South Asia.

The film ends with a cliffhanger: Having escaped by boat from Lilliput, Gulliver encounters one of the giant inhabitants of Brobdingnag themed on Medieval Europe, but there is nothing more about his adventures there or in the other lands mentioned in the novel.

== Cast ==
- Richard Harris as Gulliver
- Catherine Schell as Mary
- Norman Shelley as Father
- Meredith Edwards as Uncle

=== Voice cast ===
- Michael Bates
- Denise Bryer
- Julian Glover
- Stephen Jack
- Bessie Love
- Murray Melvin
- Nancy Nevinson
- David Prowse (uncredited)
- Robert Rietti
- Norman Shelley
- Vladek Sheybal
- Roger Snowden
- Bernard Spear
- Graham Stark

== Production ==
The film was not consistently funded during its production, which was noted by some reviewers who consider this production to be "low-budget".

Animation sequences were produced by Belvision.

One of the voice actors, Denise Bryer, had previously done voice acting for a 1964 "Talespinners" children's record adapting Gulliver in Lilliput.

== Reception ==
In comparison to other adaptations of the source material, this film is not well-received. In the words of one reviewer, "the film falls flat."
