= Nicholas Parsons =

English actor, straight man and presenter (1923–2020)

Nicholas Parsons CBE
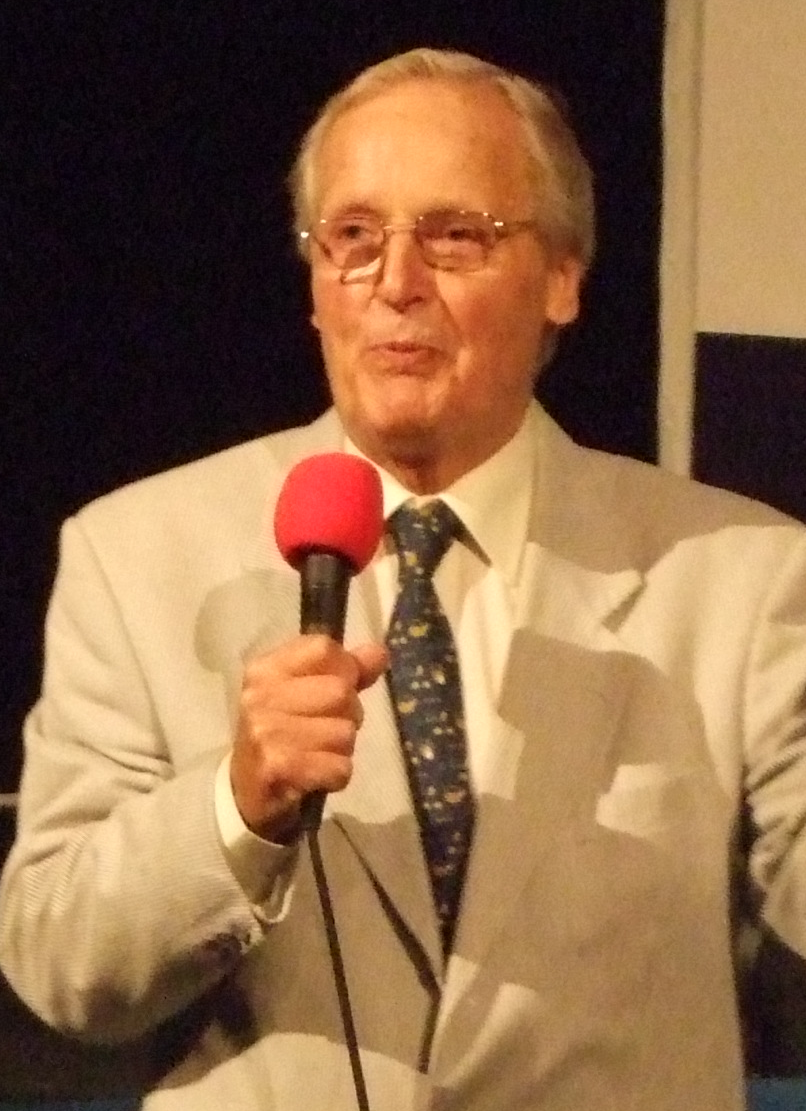
- Parsons recording Just a Minute at the Pleasance Grand, Edinburgh, 2007
- Born: Christopher Nicholas Parsons; 10 October 1923; Grantham, Lincolnshire, England
- Died: 28 January 2020 (aged 96); Aylesbury, Buckinghamshire, England
- Resting place: St John-at-Hampstead Churchyard, London, England
- Education: St Paul's School
- Alma mater: University of Glasgow
- Occupations: Actor; presenter; straight man
- Years active: 1945–2020
- Known for: Just a Minute (1967–2019); Sale of the Century (1971–1983)
- Office: Rector of the University of St Andrews (1988–1991); President of the Lord's Taverners (1998–1999)
- Spouses: Denise Bryer (m. 1954; div. 1989) Ann Reynolds (m. 1995)
- Children: 2
- Nicholas Parsons' voice from the BBC programme Great Lives, 13 May 2008.

Christopher Nicholas Parsons (10 October 1923 – 28 January 2020) was an English actor, straight man and radio and television presenter. He was the long-running presenter of the comedy radio show Just a Minute and hosted the game show Sale of the Century during the 1970s and early 1980s.

Parsons was born and grew up in Grantham, Lincolnshire, and was educated at St Paul's School, London. He became a full-time actor following the Second World War and began appearing in various theatre, film and television roles, including support to Arthur Haynes as his straight man. He began presenting Just a Minute in 1967 and never missed a show until 2018. In addition to his well-known roles on this and Sale of the Century, he appeared as a guest on other television shows, including Doctor Who and Have I Got News for You.

== Early life ==
Christopher Nicholas Parsons was born on 10 October 1923 at 1 Castlegate, Grantham, Lincolnshire; he was the middle child of the family, having an older brother and a younger sister. His father, Paul, was a general practitioner whose patients included the family of Margaret Thatcher; claims that he delivered her are apocryphal. His mother, Nell, née Maggs, was a nurse before her marriage.

Parsons was born left-handed but was made to write with his right hand. As a child, he had a stutter, which he managed to control as he grew older, and was slow to learn owing to dyslexia. He also suffered from migraines, but nevertheless excelled at school.

After education at Colet Court and St Paul's School in Barnes, London, Parsons' initial career plan was to become an actor. However, his parents believed that a career in engineering would be better, as he had repaired grandfather clocks as a young man and was creative with his hands. While at school, he was best friends with John Treacher who later joined the Royal Navy and rose to become Commander-in-Chief Fleet. Parsons' nickname at school was "Shirley" after Shirley Temple.

After he had left school, his family contacted relatives in Scotland, who arranged a job for him in Clydebank near Glasgow, where he spent five years employed as an engineering apprentice at Drysdales, a maker of marine pumps. Parsons was 16 when his parents sent him from his relatively privileged home in London to the industrially hardened city of Glasgow. Sixty years later, in 2010, he recorded a nostalgic radio programme, titled Doon the Watta, about his time as an apprentice, highlighting his posh middle-class accent amidst the Glasgow working-class dialect. While there, he also spent two six-month periods studying engineering at the University of Glasgow. He never graduated, but finished his apprenticeship and gained sufficient qualifications to become a mechanical engineer. He was offered a posting in the Merchant Navy during the Second World War, but he did not join the service after falling seriously ill with pleurisy. He spent five months in hospital and at one point his survival chances were rated only 50-50.

== Career in entertainment ==
Parsons started his career while training as an engineering apprentice; he was discovered by Canadian impresario Carroll Levis, and appeared in his radio show.

=== Early career in theatre ===
At the end of the Second World War, Parsons became a full-time professional actor. He made his stage debut in the West End as Kiwi in The Hasty Heart at the Aldwych Theatre in 1945 which ran for over a year, then played the lead in a tour of Arsenic and Old Lace. He made his film debut in Master of Bankdam in 1947 and continued his stage career, with two years in repertory at Bromley, and later, Windsor and Maidstone. In 1952, he became a resident comedian at the Windmill Theatre, performing regular nights of stand-up comedy to packed houses.

He starred in the West End show Boeing-Boeing and other West End productions.

=== Film, TV and radio ===
In the 1950s and 1960s, he appeared in many supporting roles in British films. In the late 1960s, he portrayed David Courtney in the American sitcom The Ugliest Girl in Town.

In the 1950s, Parsons provided the non-singing voice of Tex Tucker in the children's TV puppet series Four Feather Falls, having put himself forward for the job at the suggestion of his first wife, actress and voiceover artiste Denise Bryer, who was in the show. During the late 1960s, he created and presented a satirical programme on BBC Radio 4 called Listen to This Space, which by the standards of its time was very avant-garde, and he received the Radio Personality of the Year Award for his work on this programme in 1967.

Parsons became known to TV audiences in the 1950s and 1960s as the straight man to comedian Arthur Haynes for ten years; the partnership broke up at Haynes' request. They had a successful season at the London Palladium in 1963, and shortly before the split appeared on The Ed Sullivan Show in the United States, although Parsons was not credited. Subsequently, Parsons returned to the stage, before becoming a regular on The Benny Hill Show from 1968 to 1971.

After Haynes died, Parsons appeared as a personality in his own right on television, including in the long-running Anglia Television quiz show Sale of the Century, broadcast weekly from 1971 to 1983. In 1983 Hill wrote and performed in the sketch "Sale of the Half Century", with himself cast as Parsons.

Parsons was the subject of This Is Your Life in 1978 when he was surprised by Eamonn Andrews.

=== Just a Minute ===
Parsons was the host of the BBC Radio 4 comedy panel game Just a Minute from its first broadcast on 22 December 1967.

Although there were a number of early episodes when he relinquished the chair and was a panellist, Parsons never missed an episode until 2018, when regular panellist Gyles Brandreth stood in for him for two episodes that were recorded in April and broadcast in June, due to a bout of illness: Parsons was then 94 years old. Brandreth again stood in the following year for two shows recorded at the Edinburgh Festival Fringe. Just a Minute continued to be transmitted with Parsons as host until his last show on 23 September 2019. After Parsons' death there were several guest hosts until a new permanent host Sue Perkins took over from 2021.

=== 1980s ===
In 1988, Parsons appeared as himself in The Comic Strip episode "Mr. Jolly Lives Next Door", alongside Rik Mayall and Ade Edmondson. The following year, he guest-starred in Doctor Who, playing Reverend Wainwright in the Seventh Doctor serial The Curse of Fenric.

=== 1990s ===
Parsons featured in the original London cast of the Stephen Sondheim musical Into the Woods at the Phoenix Theatre in 1990 as the Narrator. In 1991, he appeared as the Mayor in the BBC's children's series Bodger & Badger. This was followed by an appearance in the fourth and final series of the UK TV show Cluedo as Reverend Green in 1993.

Parsons took the role of the Narrator in the 21st anniversary revival of the stage musical The Rocky Horror Show at the Duke of York's Theatre in the West End in 1994.

=== Later career ===
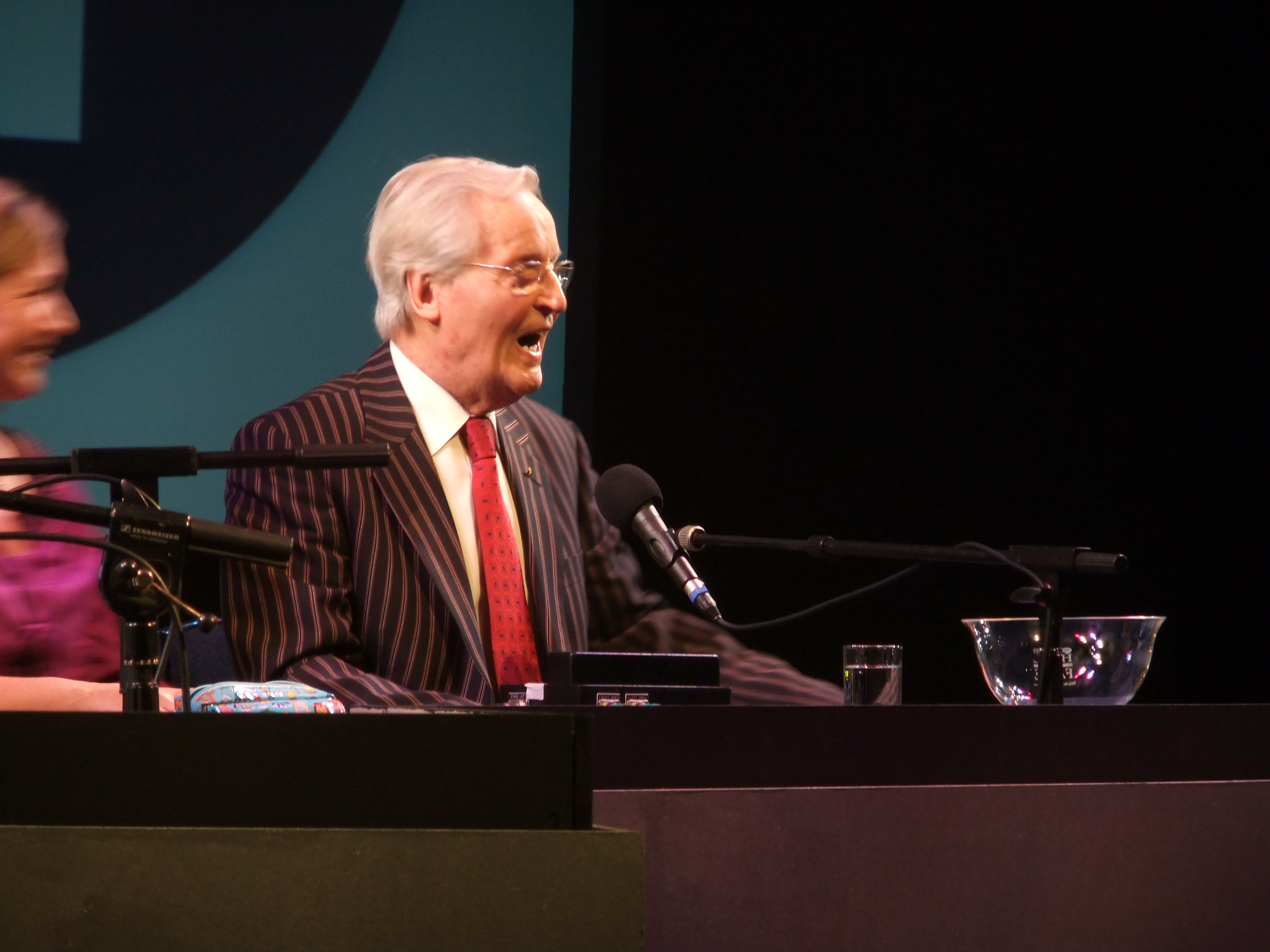
Parsons in 2010

In 2005 Parsons was guest presenter on the BBC topical quiz show Have I Got News for You. He appeared on Celebrity Mastermind in 2007. Just a Minute transferred to television in 2012 for a ten-part early-evening series to celebrate its 45th anniversary, with Parsons and regular panellist Paul Merton. He appeared opposite ex-wife Denise Bryer in the Big Finish adaptation of the Gerry Anderson series Terrahawks, playing the ex-husband of Bryer's character, Zelda.

Parsons wrote an autobiography entitled The Straight Man: My Life in Comedy, which was published in 1994, and he produced a book of memoirs in 2010 called Nicholas Parsons: With Just a Touch of Hesitation, Repetition and Deviation.

In October 2016, at the age of 92, Parsons presented the BBC documentary The Incredible Story of Marie Antoinette's Watch, following the story of the Marie Antoinette watch created by Abraham-Louis Breguet. Parsons was a life-long collector of clocks and watches.

He played himself and provided the voice of Dagon, Lord of the Files in Good Omens, filmed between 2017 and 2018.

From 2001, he appeared annually at the Edinburgh Festival Fringe presenting his comedy cabaret show The Happy Hour.

== Other roles ==
From 1988 to 1991, he served as Rector of the University of St Andrews. In 2005, he became for a short period honorary Chairman of the International Quizzing Association (IQA), a body that organises the World and European Quizzing Championships. He was a leading member of the Grand Order of Water Rats charity and was King Rat in 2019. He was also a patron of the British Stammering Association and was the president of the charity the Lord's Taverners from 1998 to 1999, a charity that he joined in 1964 and remained a member of until his death. He was an Ambassador for Childline and The Silver Line.

Parsons was a supporter of the Liberal Party and the Liberal Democrats. He was invited to stand as a Liberal Party candidate for Yeovil in the 1970s, but he turned down the opportunity in order to remain in the entertainment industry. On 17 October 2013, a week after his 90th birthday, he appeared as a guest on the BBC One political discussion show This Week.

== Awards and recognition ==
Parsons was appointed Officer of the Order of the British Empire (OBE) in the 2004 New Year Honours for services to drama and broadcasting. He was promoted to Commander of the Order of the British Empire (CBE) in the 2014 New Year Honours for charitable services, especially to children's charities.

Having served as rector of the University of St Andrews from 1988 to 1991, he was awarded an honorary LLD by the university in 1991. He was also awarded an honorary LLD by the University of Leicester in 2016, and an honorary D.Litt by the University of Lincoln in 2014.

He held the Guinness World Record for the longest after-dinner speech (11 hours) until it was reclaimed by former holder Gyles Brandreth.

== Personal life ==
Parsons was married twice. He was first married to actress Denise Bryer in 1954; together they had two children. The couple divorced in 1989. He married Ann Reynolds in 1995. He was a keen cricket fan, both as a player and supporter, and had a lifelong enthusiasm for clocks.

== Health and death ==
Grave of Parsons at St John-at-Hampstead.

In August 2019, Parsons suffered a fall on a train to Edinburgh, while travelling to perform his show The Happy Hour at the Edinburgh Fringe. On admission to hospital a few days later, he was found to have prostate cancer, a stomach ulcer and anaemia, and remained hospitalised in Edinburgh for 10 days, before being moved to Stoke Mandeville Hospital, near his home in Aylesbury. After two more weeks in hospital, he returned home and began a slow recuperation from the fall. Despite his illness, he continued to work through his final months of life, until his death at Stoke Mandeville Hospital on 28 January 2020, aged 96.

== Publications ==
- The Straight Man: My Life in Comedy, Weidenfeld & Nicolson, 1994. ISBN 978-0297812395
- Nicholas Parsons: With Just a Touch of Hesitation, Repetition and Deviation: My Life in Comedy, Mainstream Publishing, 2011. ISBN 978-1845967123
- Welcome to Just a Minute!: A Celebration of Britain's Best-Loved Radio Comedy, Canongate Books, 2014. ISBN 978-1782112471

== Filmography ==
Year	Title	Role	Notes
1938	A Yank at Oxford	Extra	(Uncredited)
1954	To Dorothy a Son	Passport Official	Uncredited
1955	Simon and Laura	TV Producer	
1955	An Alligator Named Daisy	News Interviewer	Uncredited
1956	The Long Arm	Police Constable Bates	
1956	Eyewitness	House Surgeon	
1957	Brothers in Law	Charles Poole	
1958	Happy Is the Bride	John Royd	
1959	Too Many Crooks	Tommy	
1959	Carlton-Browne of the F.O.	Rodgers	
1959	Upstairs and Downstairs	Brian	
1960	Let's Get Married	R.A.F. Officer	
1960	Doctor in Love	Dr. Hinxman	
1961	Carry On Regardless	Wolf	
1964	Murder Ahoy!	Dr. Crump	
1964	Every Day's a Holiday	Julian Goddard	
1966	The Wrong Box	Alan Fraser Scrope	
1966	The Ghost Goes Gear	Algernon Rowthorpe Plumley	
1968	Don't Raise the Bridge, Lower the River	Dudley Heath	
1971	Danger Point	Fisherman	
1974	The Best of Benny Hill	The Phantom Prowler/Mask Boutique Staffer/King Charles	
1976	Spy Story	Ben Toliver	
1989	The New Statesman	Himself	Episode: Live from Westminster
1989	Doctor Who	Reverend Wainwright	The Curse of Fenric
1993	Cluedo	Reverend Green	6 episodes
2008	Lady Godiva	Himself	
2010	Marple	Father Gorman	Episode: The Pale Horse
2019	Good Omens	Dagon (voice)	Miniseries and last TV appearance

== Theatre ==
Year	Title	Role	Company	Director	Notes
1943	Holy Isle	Bishop of Orkney and the Isles / Ba	The Glasgow Citizens Theatre	Jennifer Sounes	play by James Bridie

Academic offices
Preceded by Stanley Adams	Rector of the University of St Andrews; 1988–1991	Succeeded by Nicky Campbell
