= Glinda =

Fictional character from The Wonderful Wizard of Oz

- Oz character
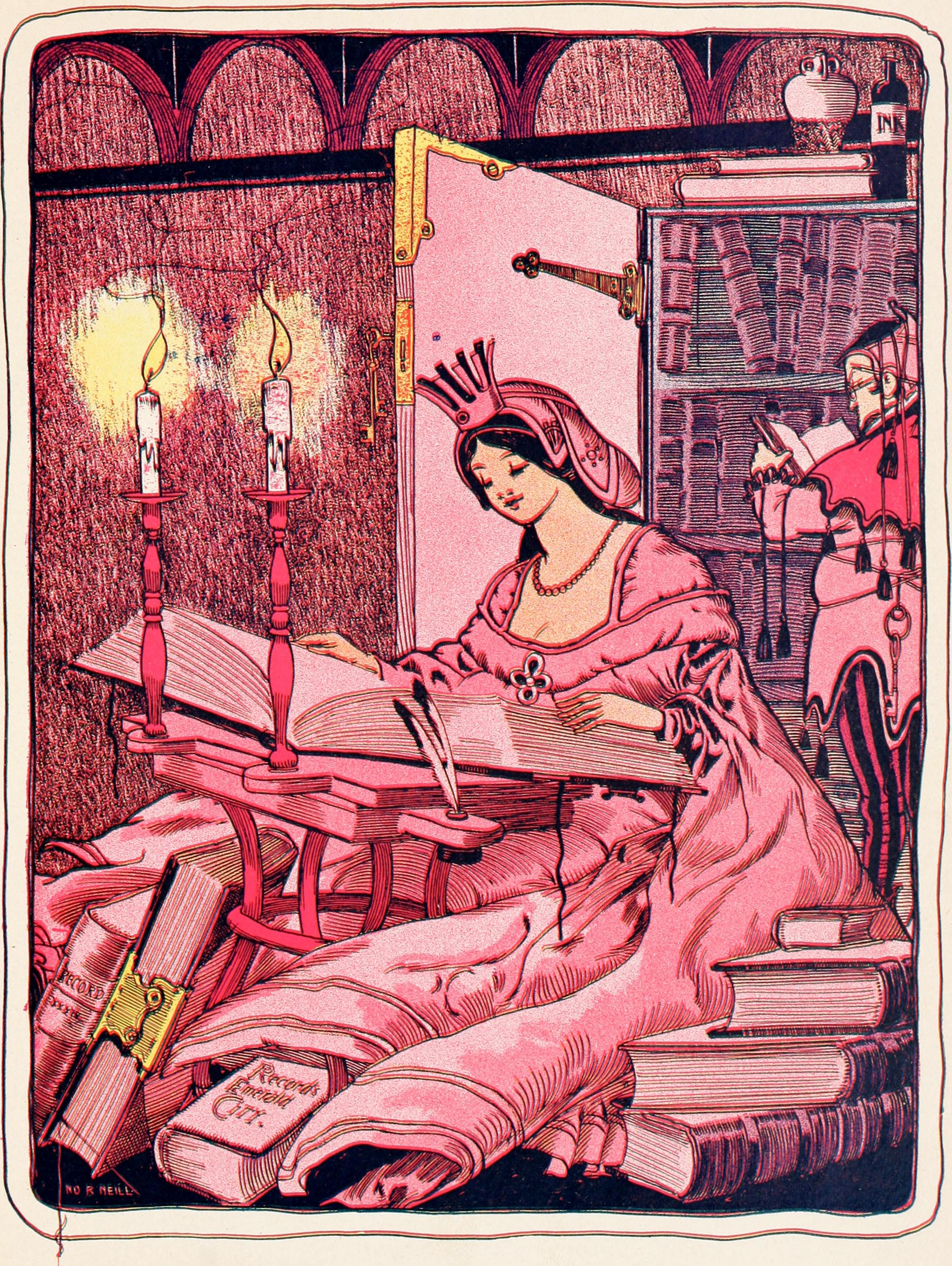
- Glinda depicted in The Marvelous Land of Oz, illustrated by John R. Neill
- First appearance: The Wonderful Wizard of Oz (1900)
- Created by: L. Frank Baum

In-universe information
- Aliases: Stella (1939) (The Wizard of the Emerald City); Glinda the Good Fairy (1971) (Journey Back to Oz); Galinda Upland (1995) (Wicked); Splenda (2007) (The Wonderful Wizard of Ha's); Glinda the Good Witch (2014) (Once Upon a Time); Glinda / Mistress North (2017) (Emerald City)
- Species: Immortal witch Sorceress; Fairy
- Gender: Female
- Title(s): The Good; The Good Witch of the South; The Sorceress of the South; The Royal Sorceress of Oz
- Occupation: Immortal and witch Protector of Oz; Ruler of the Quadling Country; Protector of Princess Ozma, the Princess of Oz
- Nationality: Ozian of Quadling descent

Glinda, also known as Glinda the Good, is a fictional character created by L. Frank Baum for his Oz novels. She first appears in Baum's 1900 children's classic The Wonderful Wizard of Oz, and is the most powerful sorceress in the Land of Oz, ruler of the Quadling Country South of the Emerald City, and protector of Princess Ozma.

== Inspiration ==
Baum spent a great deal of time with his mother-in-law, activist Matilda Joslyn Gage, who encouraged him to write down his Oz stories. Baum's biographers have drawn correlations between Baum's "Good Witch" and Gage's feminist writings.

== Literature ==
=== L. Frank Baum ===
Baum's 1900 children's novel The Wonderful Wizard of Oz refers to Glinda as the "Good Witch of the South"; (Note: Identified in the original books as the Good Witch of the South, in the 1939 Wizard of Oz film, Glinda is identified as the Good Witch of the North) she does not appear in the novel until late in its storyline. After the Wizard flies away in his balloon, the Cowardly Lion, Scarecrow, Tin Woodman, Dorothy, and Toto travel South to the land of the Quadlings to ask Glinda for her advice. Glinda tells Dorothy of how she can return home to Kansas using the Silver Shoes, and frees the Winged Monkeys by giving them the Golden Cap that controls them, after having them escort Dorothy's three companions safely from Quadling Country. In the 1939 film, Glinda is a composite character with the Witch of the North. Later books call her a "sorceress" rather than a "witch", though Baum's writings make clear that he did not view witches as inherently "wicked".

In the books, Glinda is depicted as a beautiful young woman with long, rich rare red hair and blue eyes, wearing a pure white dress. She is much older than her appearance would suggest, but "knows how to keep young in spite of the many years she has lived"—a fact that is established in The Wonderful Wizard of Oz, by the Soldier with the Green Whiskers. She has ruled the Quadling Country ever since she overthrew the Wicked Witch of the South during the period when Ozma's grandfather was "King of Oz".

Glinda plays the most active role in finding and restoring Princess Ozma, the rightful heir, to the throne of Oz, the search for whom takes place in the second book, The Marvelous Land of Oz, although Glinda had been searching for Ozma ever since the princess disappeared as a baby. It may well be that she did not overthrow the Wicked Witches of the East and West, despite being more powerful than they were, because she wanted all of Oz to be unified under its rightful ruler, Ozma, first. After Ozma's ascent to the throne, Glinda continues to help the Princess of Oz shape the future of the Land of Oz as a whole, no longer confining her powers to guarding her Quadling Kingdom in the South alone; true to her character, Glinda does not interfere in affairs of State unless Ozma seeks her counsel or help specifically.

In addition to her vast knowledge of magic, Glinda employs various tools, charms, and instruments in her workshop. The Emerald City of Oz reveals that she owns a Great Book of Records that allows her to track everything that goes on in the world from the instant it happens. Starting with The Road to Oz she trains the formerly humbug Wizard in magic; he becomes a formidable practitioner, but acknowledges that she is more powerful yet.

Glinda lives in a palace near the Deadly Desert in the far south of the Quadling Country, attended by fifty beautiful maidens from each country of Oz. She also employs a large army of female soldiers, with which she takes on General Jinjur's Army of Revolt, who had conquered the Emerald City in The Marvelous Land of Oz. Men are not prominent in Glinda's court.

Glinda is strongly protective of her subjects in the South. She creates walled, gated communities for the rabbits of Bunnybury and the paper dolls of Miss Cuttenclip, showing a personal interest in the concerns of not only the humanoid Quadlings, but also the other inhabitants of her jurisdiction.

In The Emerald City of Oz, when Ozma goes to consult Glinda about the security of her Ozian citizens, the sorceress seals off all of Oz from the Great Outside World, making Oz invisible to the eyes of mortals flying overhead in airplanes and such. However, unlike Ozma, Glinda is willing to ignore strife and oppression in remote corners of Oz like Jinxland and the Skeezer territory as long as it does not threaten the Emerald City or innocent outsiders. The readers are left with the sense that Glinda is experienced and seasoned to the point of knowing that there is not a magic cure for everything, and that certain things cannot be changed or perhaps should not be changed for better or for worse.

One of the more obscure facts about Glinda is that she created the Forbidden Fountain with the Waters of Oblivion, at the center of Oz, whose waters redeemed a former King of Oz who was exceptionally cruel. This happened "many centuries ago" according to Ozma, again alluding to Glinda's advanced age, and it is this fountain that saves Oz from the invading Nome King and his allies in The Emerald City of Oz, by making them forget their nefarious intentions. Glinda clearly made the fountain at a point in Oz's history when the Land was unified under one of the members of the Royal Family of Oz, albeit a tyrannical king in this isolated incident, and so she was able to intervene in a way that she could not when the country was divided between the Wizard and the Wicked Witches of the East and West et al., prior to Dorothy's arrival.

Most intriguingly, in The Emerald City of Oz, when the Nome King considers invading Oz, he is told by a minion, General Guph, that Glinda the Good's castle is located "at the North of the Emerald City," when it has been established that Glinda rules the South, while another witch, the one who welcomed Dorothy to Oz, and was retroactively named Tattypoo, reigned in the North. Guph may have gotten his facts muddled, as none of the Gnomes had been to Oz at that time, but it portends the depiction of Glinda as the Good Witch of the North rather than the South in the 1939 MGM film (which is the most widely known version of Oz to date).

General Guph also tells the Nome King that Glinda "commands the spirits of the air". As mentioned above, he is not an expert on Oz, but this statement made by Guph once again foreshadows a much later cinematic rendition of Glinda, in the film version of the Broadway musical The Wiz in which Glinda (played by Lena Horne) and the original (played by Billie Burke) is responsible for the twister that brings Dorothy's house to Oz and sets all subsequent events into motion.

Of all the characters in L. Frank Baum's Oz, Glinda is the most enigmatic. Despite being titled "Glinda the Good," she is not a one-dimensional caricature whose sole purpose is to embody and generate all that is generically considered "good," as indicated above.

She ultimately becomes the adult anchor in the Oz books, because she is never distracted or swayed, and always maintains absolute firmness of purpose—something that cannot be said for the other adult characters in the series such as the Wizard and the Shaggy Man or even the Good Witch of the North. They all fall short of Glinda's wisdom and resoluteness.

In Baum's final book, Glinda of Oz, we learn that Glinda resides in a castle with one hundred of the most beautiful women in Oz at her beck and call.

In Alexander Volkov's Magic Land series, the witch is called Stella and appears very rarely. However, she is often referred to by the author and the characters and always offers people help or refuge during hard times. She is described as a golden-haired eternally young beauty in a pink dress. She rules the Pink Country which is inhabited by the tribe of Chatterboxes. She seems to be a good friend of the Winged Monkeys ever since releasing them.

In Philip José Farmer's novel A Barnstormer in Oz, Glinda is portrayed as young and beautiful enough to attract the protagonist, though the interest is not mutual.

=== The Wicked Years ===
In Gregory Maguire's 1995 revisionist novel Wicked: The Life and Times of the Wicked Witch of the West, she is initially called "Galinda", and through her mother is descended from the noble Arduenna clan of the Upland. As in the original Oz books, she is revered as a powerful sorceress. Maguire follows the 1939 Wizard of Oz film in having Glinda ultimately become the Witch of the North instead of the South.

Though originally snobbish and superficial, Galinda is intelligent enough to be accepted to Shiz University's Crage Hall, where she is assigned to share a room with Elphaba. After a long period of mutual loathing, the two girls later become close friends. Near the middle of the story, Galinda removes the first 'a' from her name in tribute to Dr. Dillamond, a martyred goat professor who made the habitual mistake of calling her "Glinda" while they shared a carriage on the way to Shiz. The goat's death also prompts Glinda to re-evaluate her life, and she dedicates herself to studying sorcery, at which she proves to be quite skilled. After Elphaba leaves the university, Glinda looks after Nessarose (who goes on to become the Wicked Witch of the East) and enchants the Silver Shoes to make her walk without any assistance. Right before Elphaba leaves to go to the Emerald City, she and Glinda share a kiss, during which Elphaba tells Glinda she'll 'be all right' and that she had to 'hold out', if she could.

Years later, in the second half of the novel, Glinda is said to have gained immense wealth and prominence in society following her marriage to Sir Chuffrey, and has been nicknamed "Glinda the Good" due to her philanthropy work. She reunites with Elphaba after Nessarose is crushed by Dorothy's house, but after revealing she gave the Silver Shoes to Dorothy, Elphaba angrily cuts ties with her. The two do not see nor speak to each other ever again, as Elphaba is accidentally melted by Dorothy at the end of the novel. Glinda wakes up on the night of the Witch's death overcome with a feeling of dread.

A widowed Glinda appears in 2005's Son of a Witch and 2011's Out of Oz, the second and fourth entries in The Wicked Years series spawned from the first novel.

== Film and television ==
=== The Fairylogue and Radio-Plays (1908) ===
In The Fairylogue and Radio-Plays, Glinda was portrayed by Evelyn Judson. She was played by Olive Cox in the 1910 version of The Wonderful Wizard of Oz. In the latter, she appears in one scene in which she enlarges Toto to make him a better protector for Dorothy.

=== The Wizard of Oz (1939) ===
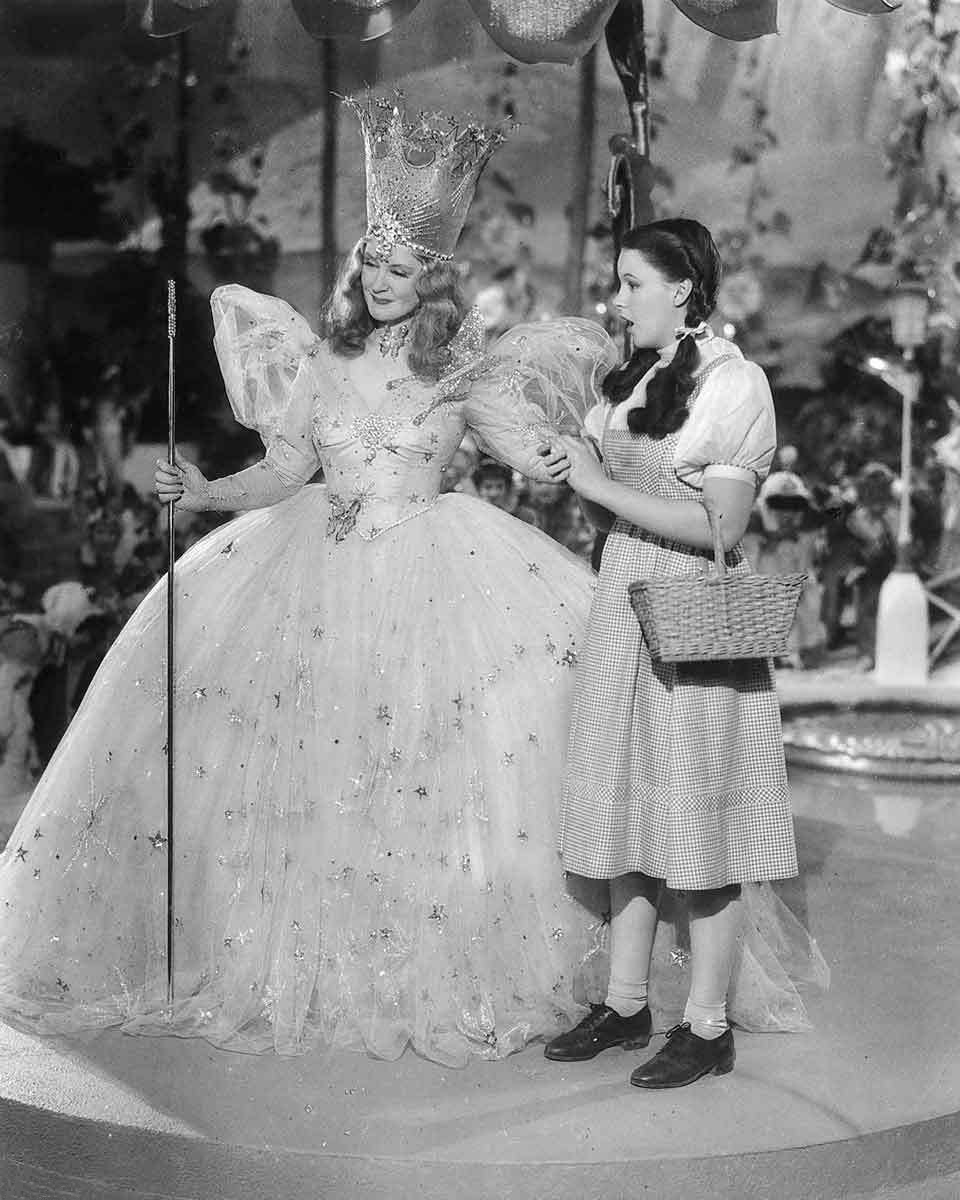
Dorothy (Judy Garland, right) with Glinda, the Good Witch of the North (Billie Burke) in The Wizard of Oz, 1939

In 1939's The Wizard of Oz, Glinda is the Good Witch of the North. She is played in the film by Billie Burke. Glinda performs the functions of not only the novel's Good Witch of the North and Good Witch of the South, but also the novel's Queen of Field Mice, by being the one who welcomes Dorothy to Oz, sends her "off to see the Wizard," and orchestrates her rescue from the deadly poppy field in addition to revealing the secret to going back home.

Like Aunt Em and Uncle Henry, who do not have Oz counterparts, Glinda does not have a sepia-tone Kansas counterpart. However, when performed on stage, the actress playing Aunt Em will sometimes also play Glinda.

=== The Wonderful Land of Oz (1969) ===
In The Wonderful Land of Oz, Glinda is played by Hilary Lee Gaess; her singing voice was dubbed. She is portrayed as much younger than the Billie Burke incarnation, although her pink costume/gown is similar. She sings 2 stirring solos titled "Try To Touch a Star" and "I've Watched Over You." In the latter song, she makes the touching and astute observation that the Scarecrow possesses not only a brain, but also a heart (at least metaphorically).

She is able to summon the powers of "all the good fairies" when restoring Princess Ozma to her rightful form, almost making her equal to L. Frank Baum's Queen Lurline (whereas Baum's Glinda is a stately sorceress showing no association with fairy magic or "unscrupulous" witchcraft, insisting that the witch Mombi herself disenchant Ozma unlike in this film). Apart from undoing Mombi's evil magic herself, this incarnation of Glinda also tells the old Gillikin witch that she has "allowed" her to practice some of her "less horrible tricks" thus far, suggesting that every practitioner of magic in Oz is ultimately answerable to Glinda should they go too far.

=== Journey Back to Oz (1972) ===
In Journey Back to Oz, the unofficial sequel to the 1939 film, operatic mezzo-soprano Risë Stevens provides the voice of "Glinda, the Good Fairy" as she is described in the opening title sequence (however, the Cowardly Lion refers to her as the Good Witch of the North later in the film). In L. Frank Baum's novel, The Lost Princess of Oz, the Wizard says: "Ozma is a fairy, and so is Glinda, so no power can kill or destroy them, but you girls are all mortals and so are Button-Bright and I, so we must watch out for ourselves." However, the only fact established by this statement is that Glinda is one of Oz's "fairy people" (L. Frank Baum's term for anyone native to an enchanted land) rather than a Fairy proper. Even the citizens of Oz who do not possess magical powers are referred to as "fairy people" by Baum in The Emerald City of Oz, meaning that they are not mortals like Dorothy and the Wizard who were born in the outside world.

In this film, it is revealed that this Glinda's magic is no match for Mombi's (the exact opposite was true in Baum's original books). Still, she helps Dorothy confront Mombi and her army of green elephants in a way that evokes the help offered by the Queen of Field Mice in Baum's The Land of Oz. She sings a climactic song called "You Have Only You (To Look To)" to Dorothy, making her look inside herself for the strength that is not forthcoming from old companions such as the Tin Woodman and the Cowardly Lion. In this regard, Glinda reveals how in touch she is with stark reality, a trait that hearkens back to Baum's original Glinda.

At the end of the film, she sends Dorothy back to Kansas by conjuring up another tornado. This too is in keeping with L. Frank Baum's original Glinda, who had the power to "command the spirits of the air" according to The Emerald City of Oz.

=== The Wizard of Oz (1982) ===
In the 1982 film The Wizard of Oz, Glinda, looking very young and with long blonde hair, voiced by Kumiko Takizawa in Japanese and Wendy Thatcher in English, claims to be the sister of the Good Witch of the North despite the appearance of quite a large age gap (Baum did always say she is much older than she looks), and appears in the Emerald City in a deus ex machina similar to the MGM film.

=== Return to Oz (1985) ===
Glinda appears in Return to Oz. She is seen in the background at the coronation of Princess Ozma.

=== The Wonderful Wizard of Oz (1986) ===
In Panmedia's 1986 animated series, Glinda is portrayed as a tall and very slender sorceress with long blue hair. It is she who offers to make Dorothy a Princess of Oz in this series, during their very first encounter, but Dorothy maintains that she wishes to return to Kansas.

In Baum's The Land of Oz, Glinda categorically states that she does not engage in "transformations" because "they are not real", but in this series, the Good Witch transforms into an eagle in order to pursue Mombi, who attempts to fly away from the Emerald City in the form of a dragon.

After restoring Princess Ozma to the throne, Glinda uses her magic on Mombi and Jinjur to make them reform, when the witch and the rebel queen refuse to mend their villainous ways. Having thus changed Mombi and Jinjur's inherent natures, Glinda ensures that they will never create trouble for anyone again.

Glinda entrusts Dorothy with the task of preparing Ozma for her official coronation ceremony, confident that the maturer Dorothy will mould the series' playful young Ozma into a responsible queen. As the series draws to an end, Glinda telepathically contacts and saves Dorothy from falling to her death from a tower, following a confrontation with the Nome King and his minions.

=== DiC's The Wizard of Oz (1990) ===
Glinda appears in The Wizard of Oz voiced by B.J. Ward. Glinda's portrayal in this short-lived series is much more in keeping with the 1939 MGM film, although the character looks significantly younger than Billie Burke did, wears a white gown with pink embroidery (rather than a wholly pink gown), and has blonde hair. However, her voice and her personality are extremely close to the 1939 version of this Oz character. She arranges for Dorothy to return to the Land of Oz by means of the Ruby Slippers, because the Wicked Witch of the West has been brought back to life, and Glinda needs Dorothy's help to set things right again.

=== Wild at Heart (1990) ===
Actress Sheryl Lee portrays a version of the Good Witch, who appears in a hallucination to Nicolas Cage's character, Sailor Ripley, in David Lynch's 1990 black comedy thriller Wild at Heart. Glinda persuades Sailor to return to Lula Fortune (Laura Dern), his lover, and Pace, his six-year-old son during an hallucinatory conversation with her near the end of the film.

=== The Oz Kids (1996) ===
In The Oz Kids, Glinda becomes a mother and has a daughter Andrea. Voiced by Erika Schickel. Her daughter Andrea has a dress similar to Princess Ozma's.

=== The Muppets' Wizard of Oz (2005) ===
In The Muppets' Wizard of Oz, Glinda is the Good Witch of the South and is played by Miss Piggy, as are her sisters the Good Witch of the North and the two Wicked Witches. In keeping with the traditions of Muppet films, she is attracted to the Scarecrow (played by Kermit the Frog). She is portrayed in a lavender dress with a feather boa, an archetypal Hollywood starlet much more in keeping with the character of Miss Piggy rather than Glinda. Miss Piggy's other role is herself. Prior to Dorothy's journey, she appears with Kermit and tries to get rid of Dorothy. After Dorothy's journey, she returns for the Muppets' show.

=== Tom and Jerry and the Wizard of Oz (2011) ===
Frances Conroy voices Glinda in Tom and Jerry and the Wizard of Oz and Tom and Jerry: Back to Oz in 2016.

=== Supernatural (2013) ===
A character described as 'a good kind of fairy' named Gilda, portrayed by Tiffany Dupont, appears in the Supernatural season 8 episode ‘LARP and the Real Girl.’ Despite the name similarity, the character has no connection to Oz mythology, which the series explores separately through its Dorothy Gale storyline in season 9 & 10.

=== Oz the Great and Powerful (2013) ===
Glinda is portrayed by Michelle Williams in the 2013 Disney film Oz the Great and Powerful. In this prequel, she is Glinda the Good Witch of the South as well as the daughter of the slain king of Oz. Theodora (Mila Kunis) and Evanora (Rachel Weisz), are the future Wicked Witches of the West and East, respectively. In the film, she helps a good-hearted con artist named Oscar Diggs (James Franco) defeat the sisters and become the Wizard of Oz.

=== Legends of Oz: Dorothy's Return (2013) ===
Glinda was voiced by Bernadette Peters in the CGI animated film Legends of Oz: Dorothy's Return, which was released in 2014.

=== RWBY (2013) ===
In the American 3D anime RWBY, Glinda the Good Witch is represented by Glynda Goodwitch, a skilled Huntress with telekinetic abilities. Unlike her inspiration, Goodwitch, voiced by Kathleen Zuelch, possesses a noticeably short temper. Goodwitch serves as the right-hand associate of Professor Ozpin (whose likeness alludes to the Wizard of Oz) and plays an integral part in training the students of Beacon Academy to protect the world from evil forces.

=== Once Upon a Time (2014) ===
Sunny Mabrey as Glinda in the TV series Once Upon a Time

Glinda appears in the second half of Season 3 of Once Upon a Time played by Sunny Mabrey. In a sisterhood of witches, Glinda, the Witch of the South, along with the Witch of the East (Sharon Taylor) and the Witch of the North (Karen Holness), protect Oz with each of their magic affinities. Only the 4th seat of the sisterhood—representing innocence—remains empty, but through Glinda's guardianship of the Book of Records, a prophecy foretells of a sorceress coming to Oz via a cyclone to join them. Secondly, the book also states this witch will "unseat the greatest evil the realm has ever seen". After seeing Zelena (Rebecca Mader) punish the deceitful Walsh/Wizard of Oz (Christopher Gorham), Glinda believes this woman, who arrived to Oz many years ago from a cyclone, will fulfill the prophecy. Though Zelena is more interested in changing her past, Glinda convinces the unsure redhead that her destiny lies in changing her own future by becoming a good witch, however, she does not tell Zelena about the second part of the prophecy. From joining the sisterhood, she gifts Zelena a pendant to harness her powers. While showing Zelena the western area of Oz, they approach wreckage from a cyclone and take in a girl, Dorothy Gale (Matreya Scarrwener). Zelena, from reading the Book of Records, believes Dorothy will become the Witch of the West and defeat her. Glinda doesn't believe this to be true, but she witnesses Zelena attack Dorothy, who causes her assailant to melt with water. Realizing the prophecy was right, Glinda offers Dorothy a place with the sisterhood, but the latter wishes to go home. With Zelena defeated, the Wizard reverts to his old self and thus Glinda helps her to return home with his assistance. Only after, Zelena reveals she masqueraded as the Wizard to get rid of Dorothy. Glinda vows to find another sorceress to fulfill the prophecy, but Zelena banishes her to the Enchanted Forest. In this new realm, she begins living in the north of woods, south of Rumpelstiltskin's (Robert Carlyle) castle, hidden in a pocket dimension of ice and snow, which only the pure of heart may enter through.

Sensing the incoming presence of Snow White (Ginnifer Goodwin) and Prince Charming (Josh Dallas) crossing into her realm, Glinda makes herself known to them. When Snow White asks for Regina's whereabouts since she was just with them, Glinda states that the Queen didn't meet the qualifications needed for entering through the door. The banished Good Witch briefly explains her past friendship with Zelena and tells them the Wicked Witch's greatest weakness is light magic. Recalling that her own daughter, Emma, is a product of the strongest magic of all—true love, Snow White believes she may be able to defeat Zelena. Glinda agrees with this sentiment; further prompting Snow White to go through with casting another Dark Curse to send everyone back to Storybrooke.

=== Emerald City (2015) ===
Glinda appears in the first season of Emerald City, portrayed by Joely Richardson (based on both the characters of Glinda the Good Witch and the Good Witch of the North from the L. Frank Baum's Oz Books). The Mistress of the North "Maiden of the Northern Light, Mother of the Sound and Pure" and one of the last Cardinal Witches of Oz, Glinda is an authoritative woman who has had a deep-seated hatred towards the Wizard (Vincent D'Onofrio) ever since he outlawed magic. Since the change of regime in Oz, Glinda also runs a boarding house for orphaned girls where she oversees their education and chooses the best of them to join the Wizard's High Council. It is revealed that she in fact conspires against the Wizard's rule and prepares to overthrow him, using the Wizard's councilwomen as spies and aiming to use the secretly raised young witches for war.

Emerald City also has another witch half based on the Witch of the South, named Mother South, that is a cardinal witch together with her daughters Glinda, West and East. Mother South gave birth to all of the witches in Oz, over a thousand years ago.

=== Dorothy and the Wizard of Oz (2017) ===
Glinda appears in the animated series Dorothy and the Wizard of Oz, voiced by Grey Griffin. In this show, she is depicted as having an evil twin sister named Melinda the Mean (also voiced by Grey Griffin).

=== Lost in Oz (2017) ===
Glinda is one of the main characters in the animated series Lost in Oz. Voiced by Jennifer Hale, she is sought by Dorothy and her friends to help her return to Kansas.

=== Wicked (2024) and Wicked: For Good (2025) ===
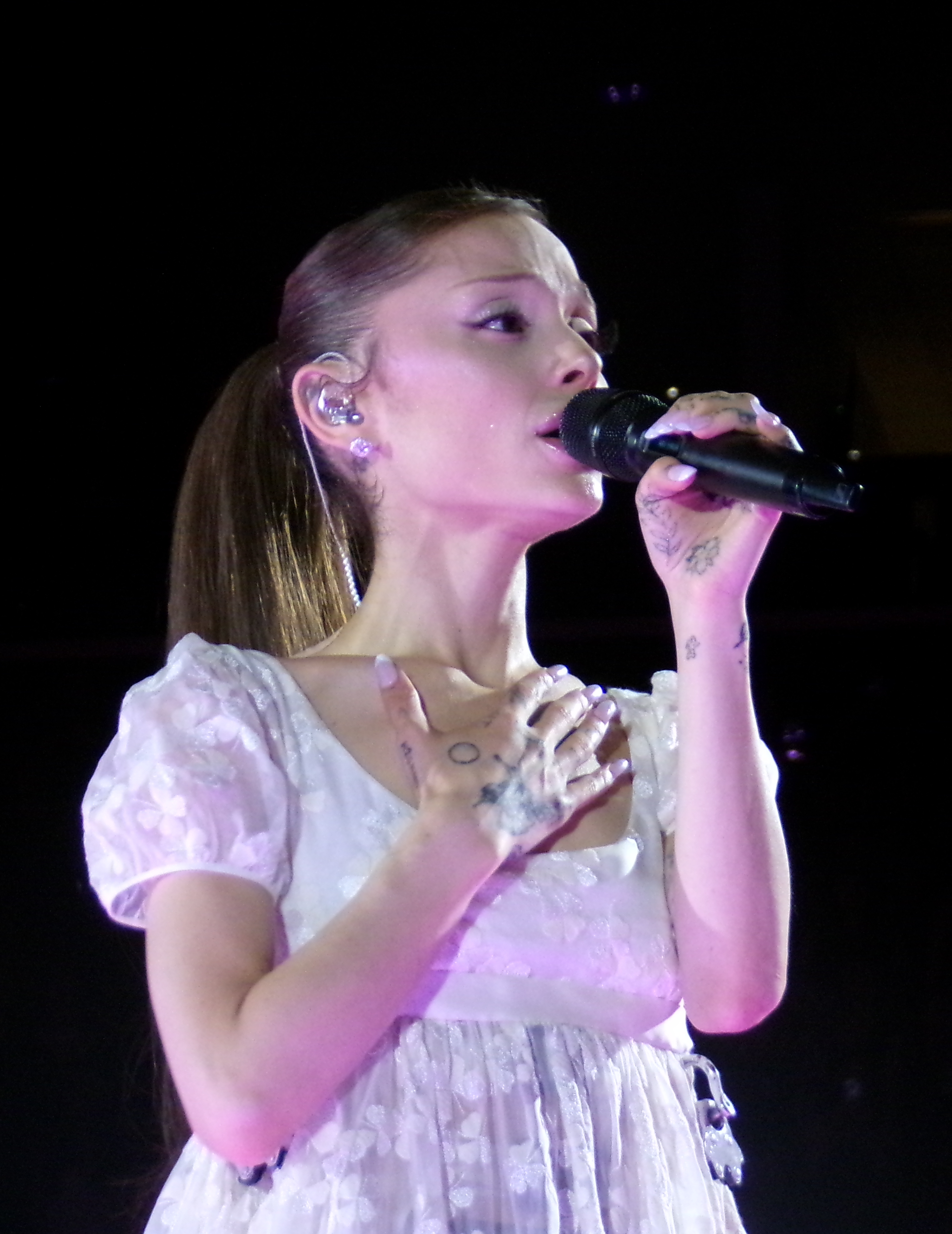
Ariana Grande portrayed Glinda in the films Wicked and Wicked: For Good (2025).

Ariana Grande-Butera portrayed Glinda in Wicked (2024), based on the first act of the 2003 stage musical, and reprised her role in the sequel Wicked: For Good (2025). Scarlett Spears portrays a younger Glinda in the second film. Unlike the stage musical, this version of the character is known as the Good Witch of the North in the film's screenplay, similar to the 1939 film. For her performance in the first film, Grande received a nomination for the Academy Award for Best Supporting Actress.

=== Robot Chicken (2018 and 2020) ===
Kristin Chenoweth voiced Glinda in the thirteenth episode of the ninth season of Robot Chicken, while Julia Garner voiced the character later in 2020.

=== Family Guy ===
Glinda appears in a cutaway with the Wicked Witch of the West.

== Musicals ==
=== The Wizard of Oz (1942) ===
In 1942, the 1939 film was adapted into a stage musical for performance at The MUNY in St. Louis. This version has been performed widely throughout the United States. Glinda in this version is called the Sorceress of the North; and Broadway star and ballerina Patricia Bowman portrayed the role in its initial staging.

=== The Wiz ===
In the Broadway musical The Wiz, Glinda is the Good Witch of the South, as she appears in the Oz books. She appears only once at the end of the musical to help Dorothy return to Kansas from the Land of Oz. Glinda is the sister of Addaperle (Abrakadabra), Evillene (Sadista), and Evvamean, the other three witches of Oz. The role was originated by Dee Dee Bridgewater.

In the 1978 film adaptation, she is portrayed by Lena Horne, and causes the snowstorm that brings Dorothy to Oz. She is also portrayed by Uzo Aduba in the 2015 television special.

=== Wicked ===
Glinda appears in Wicked, the 2003 stage musical adaptation of Gregory Maguire's 1995 novel. The role was originated on Broadway by Kristin Chenoweth, who was nominated for the Tony Award for Best Actress in a Musical in 2004; the award ultimately went to her co-star Idina Menzel, who originated the role of Elphaba.

Unlike her novel counterpart, Glinda is given a significantly expanded role in the musical, with her and Elphaba's relationship comprising much of the plot. Her wardrobe as "Glinda the Good" also deviates from her depictions in Maguire's novel and the 1939 Wizard of Oz film, now wearing a light blue gown as opposed to pink.
