= Aunt Em =

Emily Gale
- Oz character
- Aunt Em in the background of an illustration
- First appearance: The Wonderful Wizard of Oz (1900)
- Created by: L. Frank Baum
- Portrayed by: Mary Carr (1925 film); Clara Blandick (1939 film); Theresa Merritt (The Wiz); Aretha Franklin (1995 Apollo Theater Revival); Piper Laurie (Return to Oz); Queen Latifah (The Muppets' Wizard of Oz); Stephanie Mills (The Wiz Live!); Gina Stockdale (Once Upon a Time)

In-universe information
- Gender: Female
- Title: Royal Mender of the Stockings of the Ruler of Oz
- Occupation: Housewife, farmer
- Family: Dorothy Gale (niece); Unnamed sister
- Spouse: Uncle Henry
- Relatives: Uncle Bill Hugson (brother-in-law); Unnamed Australians (in-laws)
- Nationality: American

Emily Gale, commonly referred to as Aunt Em or Auntie Em, is a fictional character from the Oz books. She is married to Uncle Henry and the aunt of Dorothy Gale, who lives together with them on a farm in Kansas. In The Wonderful Wizard of Oz, she is described as having been a "young, pretty wife" when she arrived at Uncle Henry's farm, but having been "grayed" by her life there, implying that she appears older than her years. Baum writes that when Dorothy came to live with her, Em would "scream and press her hand upon her heart" when startled by Dorothy's laughter, and she appears emotionally distant to her at the beginning of the story. However, after Dorothy is restored to her at the end of the book, her true nature is seen: she cries out, "My darling child!" and covers her with kisses.

There is no question about Dorothy's love for her aunt: her request to the magic Silver Shoes is "Take me home to Aunt Em!"

== Oz books ==
Em spends most of her life working on farms. In The Emerald City of Oz, she states that she has raised chickens for "nearly forty years". After confessing to Dorothy that their farm was facing imminent foreclosure, they all move to the Land of Oz to live for good in the Emerald City. Princess Ozma appoints Em "Royal Mender of the Stockings of the Ruler of Oz" in order to keep her busy.

Her sister is married to Bill Hugson. It is never clarified in the books whether it is she or Uncle Henry who is Dorothy's blood relative. (It is also possible that "Aunt" and "Uncle" are affectionate terms of a foster family and that Dorothy is not related to either of them.) She and Henry have no children of their own. Whether this is through choice or infertility is not revealed.

She is featured slightly less than Uncle Henry in the Oz books, despite having a bigger role in the 1939 film The Wizard of Oz. Ruth Plumly Thompson gave her only two brief mentions in The Royal Book of Oz and Grampa in Oz. She had somewhat larger roles in John R. Neill's The Wonder City of Oz and The Scalawagons of Oz and Jack Snow's The Magical Mimics in Oz.

In The Emerald City of Oz, she shows herself particularly unamenable to Oz, asking for a back attic room and simpler clothing, and is gauche enough to tell Billina that chickens are for broiling and eating (without realizing that such a conversation would be deeply offensive). Uncle Henry has seen more of the world than she has, and is much more prepared to accept Oz as it is. In this book, unlike in The Wonderful Wizard of Oz, her speech patterns and accent indicators are very similar to Sairy Ann Bilkins, the title character of Baum's Our Landlady who was also shown to be quite set in her ways. Ultimately, though, Em comes to the epiphany that she "ha[s] been a slave all [her] life", and is ready for her life to change.

She appears occasionally in the works of Baum's successors in Oz literature; one notable example is Eric Shanower's The Giant Garden of Oz.

== Film adaptations ==
=== The Wizard of Oz (1925 film) ===
Em was portrayed by Mary Carr in this production. As in Baum's 1900 novel, she is Henry's wife.

=== The Wizard of Oz (1939 film) ===
In this film she is referred to as "Auntie Em" (real name Emily), and urges Dorothy not to bother them with her concerns when she and Uncle Henry (Charley Grapewin) are counting chicks. Hickory (Tin Man's alter ego) addresses her as "Mrs. Gale" just before she offers crullers to the three farmhands, and Hunk (Scarecrow's alter ego) does so just afterward. As many women of her time, she is a knitter.

The name "Gale" appears on the mailbox. Miss Almira Gulch (Wicked Witch's alter ego) says to Henry: "Gale! I want to see you and your wife right away about Dorothy!" Since Dorothy's last name is also Gale, this implies that Henry is her blood-uncle, and Em is his wife.

When Miss Gulch arrives to collect Toto, which caused Dorothy to run off in tears, Aunt Em tells her off saying to her "Almira Gulch, just because you own half the county doesn't mean that you have the power to run the rest of us! For 23 years, I've been dying to tell you what I thought of you! And now...well, being a Christian woman, I can't say it!" Baum's character never mentions anything about religion beyond the implications of Sunday best clothing. She is seen during the tornado calling for Dorothy after she ran away, but seeks shelter with Henry who ends up losing his hat when the storm approaches their farm. Unlike Zeke (Lion's alter ego), Hickory and Hunk also lose their hats as they struggle to pry open the cellar door. Both Aunt Em and Uncle Henry are the only characters whose roles are limited to the Kansas sequence and do not make an appearance in the Oz sequence (though in the stage show Aunt Em is Glinda and Uncle Henry is the gatekeeper), but Aunt Em is seen again in the crystal ball at the Wicked Witch's castle still looking for Dorothy. She reunites with Uncle Henry, their three farm workers, and Professor Marvel (Wizard's alter ego) when Dorothy awakens from being unconscious.

Aunt Em was portrayed by Clara Blandick.

=== Journey Back to Oz (1974 animated film) ===
Margaret Hamilton, who portrayed Miss Gulch and the Wicked Witch of the West, voiced Aunt Em. She and Uncle Henry (voiced by Paul Ford) have a farm worker named Amos (voiced by Larry Storch). He does not have an alter ego in Oz.

=== The Wiz (1978 film) ===
Theresa Merritt portrayed Aunt Em in the film adaptation of the Broadway musical where the character was originally played by Tasha Thomas. Stephanie Mills played the role in The Wiz Live! after playing Dorothy in the original Broadway cast and the 1984 revival. In a 2009 City Center Encores! production, Aunt Em's Oz parallel is Glinda and LaChanze played both roles.

=== Return to Oz (1985 film) ===
Piper Laurie plays Aunt Em, portrayed as a comely, blonde woman of perhaps fifty years — a physical depiction very different from Baum's worn and grayed original character. This adaptation is where viewers see Aunt Em's character fleshed out most, especially after the tornado. She is worried and concerned of Dorothy's talk of Oz and presses that they are going to have two mortgages, due to the missing house and their new one being built. She is upset at Henry's laziness and lack of work ethic as she slaves around the farmyard. Aunt Em makes a comment on Dorothy not being much help to her from her lack of sleep at night, and scolds her for wasting time on Oz before taking her to shock therapy which is administered by Dr. J. B. Worley. Aunt Em mentions her sister, Garnet, who has offered to lend the money to pay for Dorothy's therapy. Dr. Worley calls her "Mrs. Blue", which contradicts the MGM film, in which Henry's last name is Gale. After Dorothy's return from Oz, Aunt Em, Uncle Henry, and those with her find Dorothy on the riverbank. She is the one who tells Dorothy about the fire at Dr. Worley's clinic and that he perished trying to save his machines.

In a deleted scene, there is a newspaper clipping nailed to the farmhouse currently being built. It is titled "GIRL SURVIVES TORNADO: DOROTHY GALE, NIECE OF EMILY AND HENRY BLUE". This confirms Aunt Em and Uncle Henry's last name in this film to be "Blue" and implies Dorothy to be blood related to Aunt Em, not Uncle Henry.

== Other adaptations ==
She was voiced by Lurene Tuttle in the 1980 TV special Thanksgiving in the Land of Oz.

Aunt Em was played by Queen Latifah in the ABC made-for-television movie The Muppets' Wizard of Oz where this character owned a diner.

In the VeggieTales episode The Wonderful Wizard of Ha's, Aunt Em and her husband Uncle Henry were substituted by a father (Dad Asparagus) to retell The Prodigal Son, a biblical parable from the Gospel of Luke.

Lucie Arnaz performed this character in The Wizard of Oz in Concert: Dreams Come True (based on the 1939 MGM film) to benefit the Children's Defense Fund.

Aunt Em appears in the Once Upon a Time episode "Ruby Slippers" portrayed by Gina Stockdale. Her being the aunt of Dorothy Gale is still intact with this show, but in this version, she, along with Dorothy, is from a fictional version Kansas and not from Earth (dubbed the Land Without Magic in the show). After Dorothy returns from her trip to Oz, Dorothy tells her family about her trip. While the rest of the family refuses to believe, Aunt Em was the only one who believed Dorothy and refuses to send Dorothy to an asylum after she was deemed insane by the others. Sometime later, Aunt Em dies, gifting Toto to Dorothy. In the Underworld, Aunt Em's tombstone says reads "Emily Brown", which reveals her maiden name is Brown, and she runs a diner called "Auntie's Chicken and Waffles" that the Blind Witch considers as the competition. Emma, Mary Margaret, and Red make an attempt to use a bottle given to them by the Blind Witch to have Aunt Em blow some kisses in there as part of an attempt for Ruby to wake Dorothy from the Sleeping Curse as part of her unfinished business of knowing that Dorothy is alright. Before she can do, Aunt Em's body turned to water before dissolving. Hades appears stating that he has spiked her soup with the River of Lost Souls as Regina stated that they were trying to help Dorothy. After mopping up the watery remains of Aunt Em and putting them in a jar, Hades informs the other souls present to let Aunt Em's fate be a warning to anyone who turn to the Underworld visitors for hope. Later on while meeting with Zelena, Hades dumped Aunt Em's watery remains into the River of Lost Souls. Red and her friends eventually found Emily Brown's tombstone cracked, an indication that Hades' actions had caused Emily to go in the Acheron river.

Aunt Em was voiced by Frances Conroy in the direct-to-video animated film Tom and Jerry and the Wizard of Oz. Conroy also voiced Glinda.

Aunt Em appears in the crossover video game Lego Dimensions voiced by Karen Strassman. She appears as the character of an escort mission in which the player has to take her back home to the Gale farm.

Aunt Em appears in Tom and Jerry: Back to Oz voiced again by Frances Conroy.

== Comics ==
In the comic book The Oz/Wonderland Chronicles #1, Em takes Dorothy to Henry's grave in St. Ann's Cemetery. The gravestone has been snapped in two. Em later returned the slippers to Dorothy, having kept them safe at Glinda's insistence.
