= Uncle Henry =

Fictional character from L. Frank Baum's Oz-series

Henry Gale
- Oz character
- Uncle Henry with Dorothy Gale; art by W.W. Denslow (top) and John R. Neill (bottom)
- First appearance: The Wonderful Wizard of Oz (1900)
- Created by: L. Frank Baum
- Portrayed by: Frank Alexander; Charley Grapewin; Stanley Greene; Matt Clark; David Alan Grier; Lance Henriksen

In-universe information
- Gender: Male
- Title: Agricultural Adviser to Princess Ozma
- Occupation: Farmer
- Family: Dorothy Gale (niece)
- Spouse: Aunt Em
- Relatives: Uncle Bill Hugson (brother-in-law) unnamed sister-in-law Zeb of Hugson's ranch (nephew) unnamed Australians
- Nationality: American

Uncle Henry is a fictional character from The Oz Books by L. Frank Baum. He is the uncle of Dorothy Gale and husband of Aunt Em, and lived with them on a farm in Kansas.

== Oz Books ==
After their house was famously carried off to the Land of Oz by a tornado in The Wonderful Wizard of Oz, Henry mortgaged his farm in order to rebuild. This crisis, combined with the stress of Dorothy's prolonged disappearance and sudden reappearance, took a toll on his health, and his doctor ordered him to take a vacation. He took Dorothy with him on an ocean voyage to Australia, where he had relatives, but during this trip (in Ozma of Oz) Dorothy was lost again during a storm, and for several weeks a despondent Henry believed she had drowned, until she suddenly returned again, courtesy of the Nome King's Magic Belt.

In The Emerald City of Oz, Henry and Em finally confessed to Dorothy the extent of their financial problems, and revealed to her that their farm was on the verge of foreclosure. Dorothy solved this problem for them by bringing them to live with her in the Emerald City, as permanent guests of Princess Ozma. Henry was given the job of being Keeper of the Jewels in Ozma's treasure hoard for the purpose of keeping him occupied. Unlike Em, who is questioning everything about the Land of Oz, Henry accepts his new life and home with surprising ease, having traveled and seen the world a lot more than his wife had.

By Glinda of Oz, he has become one of Ozma's closest advisers, having taught his agricultural abilities to Ozite farmers, getting them producing surplus for the Emerald City storehouses.

Henry has been featured slightly more than Em in the Oz books, despite being less featured than she in the film, The Wizard of Oz (1939). Ruth Plumly Thompson gave him only two brief mentions, in The Royal Book of Oz and Grampa in Oz. He had somewhat larger roles in John R. Neill's The Wonder City of Oz and The Scalawagons of Oz, Jack Snow's The Magical Mimics in Oz, and Eric Shanower's The Giant Garden of Oz.

== Other media ==
Frank Alexander portrayed him as a villain in Larry Semon's Wizard of Oz.

In MGM's 1939 musical adaptation The Wizard of Oz, Uncle Henry is played by Charley Grapewin. Hickory (Tin Man's alter ego) addresses Aunt Em as "Mrs. Gale" just before she offers crullers to the three farmhands, and Hunk (Scarecrow's alter ego) does so just afterward. The name "Gale" appears on the mailbox and Miss Almira Gulch (Wicked Witch's alter ego) addresses him as "Mr. Gale". Baum however, never gives Uncle Henry's surname in his books, nor indicates whether Henry or Em is Dorothy's blood relative. It is also possible that "Aunt" and "Uncle" are affectionate terms of a foster family and that Dorothy is not related to either of them. In this film, Uncle Henry and Aunt Em are the only characters whose roles are limited to the Kansas sequence and do not make an appearance in the Oz sequence, although Aunt Em is seen again in the crystal ball at the Wicked Witch's castle still looking for Dorothy. He and Aunt Em reunite with their three farmworkers and Professor Marvel (Wizard's alter ego) when Dorothy awakens from being unconscious.

In the 1974 animated film Journey Back to Oz, Paul Ford voices Uncle Henry. He and Aunt Em have a farmworker named Amos (voiced by Larry Storch) who does not have an alter ego in Oz.

In the 1980 animated TV special Thanksgiving in the Land of Oz, Uncle Henry is voiced by Charles Woolf.

In the 1985 film Return to Oz, Uncle Henry's wife Emily is called "Mrs. Blue," implying that his full name is Henry Blue. He is played by Matt Clark opposite Piper Laurie. He has a broken leg throughout the film that Aunt Em insists is mended. His laziness and lack of work ethic at the beginning of the film is contrasted to his energetic and joyful actions after having found Dorothy, proving that Dorothy is where his will to work comes from.

In the comic book The Oz/Wonderland Chronicles, Henry Gale was born in 1852, but died in old age of a heart attack. He was buried in St. Ann's Cemetery in Kansas. Due to Oz residents never really dying in entirety, the "new" Witch in Oz had Henry in unconscious stasis, after his Earthly soul had died.

In the American television program Lost, the character Benjamin Linus initially tells survivors his name is Henry Gale and claims to have arrived on the island via hot air balloon. It is later revealed that the real Henry Gale was indeed a balloonist who died upon crashing on the island—just one of the many references to Baum's Oz novels on the show.

In the ABC telefilm The Muppets' Wizard of Oz, Henry was played by David Alan Grier and owned a diner rather than a farm.

In the VeggieTales episode The Wonderful Wizard of Ha's, Uncle Henry and his wife Aunt Em were substituted by a father (Dad Asparagus) to retell The Prodigal Son, a biblical parable from the Gospel.

Uncle Henry appears in Dorothy and the Witches of Oz played by Lance Henriksen. He posthumously reveals that his great-grandparents Frank and Maud Baum were the true parents of Dorothy Gale in a letter.

Uncle Henry was voiced by Stephen Root in the direct-to-video animated film Tom and Jerry and the Wizard of Oz.

Uncle Henry appears in Tom and Jerry: Back to Oz, voiced again by Stephen Root.
