= The Marvelous Land of Oz (musical) =

1981 musical film based on the novel by L. Frank Baum

- Music: Richard A. Dworsky
- Lyrics: Gary Briggle
- Book: Thomas W. Olson
- Basis: The Marvelous Land of Oz by L. Frank Baum
- Productions: The Children's Theatre Company and School of Minneapolis, 1981

The Marvelous Land of Oz is a 1981 musical play by Thomas W. Olson (book), Gary Briggle (lyrics), and Richard Dworsky (music), based on the 1904 novel by L. Frank Baum. Briggle originated the role of the Scarecrow in the original production, directed by John Cark Donahue at The Children's Theatre Company and School of Minneapolis.

The production was filmed (videotaped) for television under the direction of John Driver, the first of six such productions with Television Theatre Company and the only one to be strictly bound to the theatre. The overture in the film depicts the cast and crew getting ready for the performance, while the other five films had openings that were shot on location or in studios.

== Adaptation ==
The adaptation remains very faithful to the novel. Some more elaborate moments, such as the Jackdaw's Nest, are eliminated for the sake of time and stageability. In addition, the role of Jellia Jamb is expanded to give the story a greater female presence. In the original/film General Jinjur, contrary to the novel, appears dressed in red, despite being from the Munchkin Country, and none of the soldiers have green tops as in the novel. An added character is Colonel Cardamom, a Winkie, as Jinjur's second in command. Mombi's visits to Dr. Nikidik are also depicted onstage. Unlike the novel, the play hints that King Pastoria may still be alive with the exchange between the Scarecrow and Glinda, "Isn't Pastoria dead and gone?" "That is the popular belief." This is a nod to Ruth Plumly Thompson's The Lost King of Oz, in which Pastoria is found in an enchanted form and restored to normal, though declines returning to his duties as King. In the novel, the Scarecrow's question is a statement to which Glinda has no response in this regard.

== Songs ==
- "Mombi's Brew"
- "All Alone"
- "I'm Your Son"
- "Women in Revolt"
- "Another Perfect Morning"
- "The Good Ol' Days"
- "Professor H. M. Woggle-Bug T. E."
- "One Happy, Hearty Band"
- "Look to Your Own Heart"

== Original cast ==
- Wendy Lehr: Mombi
- Christopher Passi: Tip/Ozma
- Carl Beck: Jack Pumpkinhead
- Gary Briggle: Scarecrow
- Stephen Boe: Tin Woodman
- Rana Haugen: Jellia Jamb
- Julee Cruise: Gen. Jinjur
- Steve Huke: Guardian of the Gates
- Kathleen Wegner: Glinda
- Tom Dunn: H. M. Woggle-Bug, T. E.
- Garth Schumacher: Dr. Nikidik
- Suzanne Petri: Col. Cardamon
- Oliver Osterberg: Soldier of Oz (Omby Amby)
- James McNee: Voices of Sawhorse & Mouse Queen
