= The Wizard of Oz (1925 film) =

1925 film

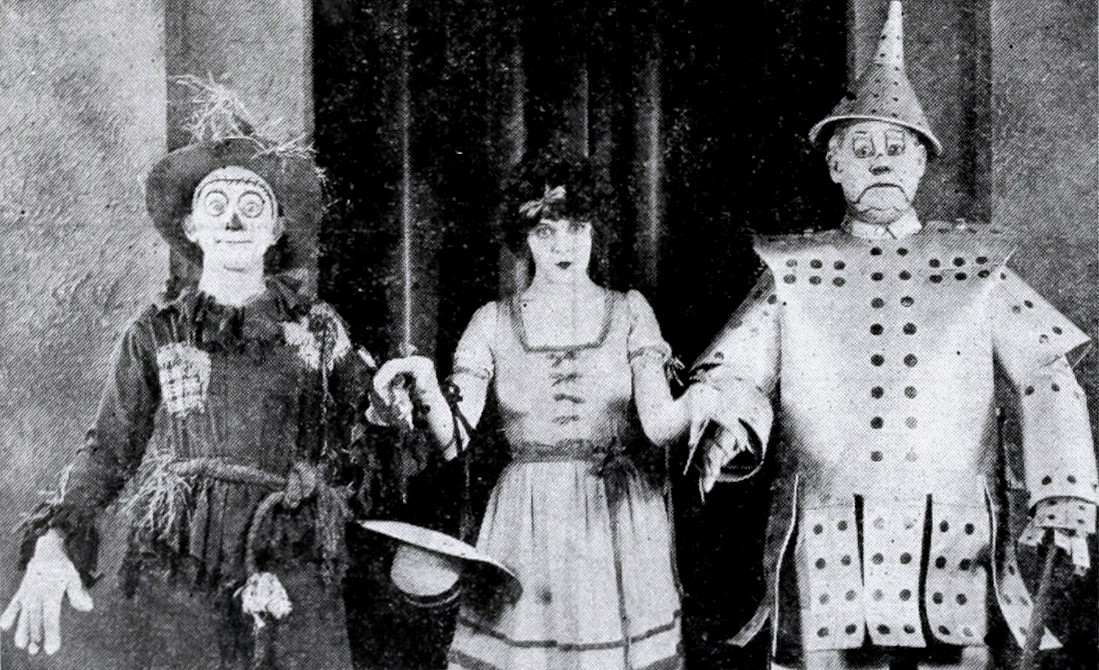
- Still from a 1924 publication
- Directed by: Larry Semon
- Written by: Larry Semon; L. Frank Baum, Jr.
- Based on: The Wonderful Wizard of Oz by L. Frank Baum
- Produced by: Larry Semon
- Starring: Larry Semon; Dorothy Dwan; Oliver Hardy; Curtis McHenry; Bryant Washburn; Josef Swickard; Charles Murray
- Cinematography: Frank B. Good; H.F. Koenekamp; Leonard Smith
- Edited by: Sam S. Zimbalist
- Distributed by: Chadwick Pictures
- Release date: April 13, 1925
- Running time: 93 minutes 85 minutes (cut edition)
- Country: United States
- Language: Silent (English intertitles)

The Wizard of Oz is a 1925 American silent fantasy-adventure comedy film directed by Larry Semon, who has the lead role of a Kansas farmhand, later disguised as the Scarecrow.

This production stars Dorothy Dwan as Dorothy, Oliver Hardy as the Tin Woodman, and Curtis McHenry briefly disguised as a lion. It is the only completed 1920s adaptation of L. Frank Baum's 1900 novel The Wonderful Wizard of Oz and less well-known than the celebrated 1939 Metro-Goldwyn-Mayer version of Baum's work, The Wizard of Oz.

In the film, Dorothy Gale, a Kansas farm girl, is told about her Uncle Henry not being her uncle after all. Suddenly, a tornado blows into Kansas and whisks the farmhands and Dorothy to Oz, where Dorothy is declared to be long-lost Princess Dorothea by Prime Minister Kruel. In Oz, the farmhands are disguised as a scarecrow, a tin man and a lion.

The full film

== Plot ==
Late at night, an elderly toy-maker reads a book to his granddaughter. In the story the Land of Oz is ruled by Prime Minister Kruel, aided by Ambassador Wikked, Lady Vishuss, and the Wizard who is a "medicine-show hokum hustler". When the discontented citiens of Oz, led by Prince Kynd, demand the return of the princess, who disappeared as a baby many years before, so she can be crowned their rightful ruler, Kruel has the Wizard distract them with a parlor trick and sends Wikked on a mission.

Meanwhile, in Kansas, Dorothy lives on a farm with her relatives. Aunt Em is a kind and caring woman but Uncle Henry is a large man with a short temper who shows little affection for his niece. He acts abusive to his three farmhands, in which two of them are in love with Dorothy. Aunt Em reveals to Dorothy that she was put on their doorstep as a baby, along with an envelope and instructions that it be opened only when she turns 18.

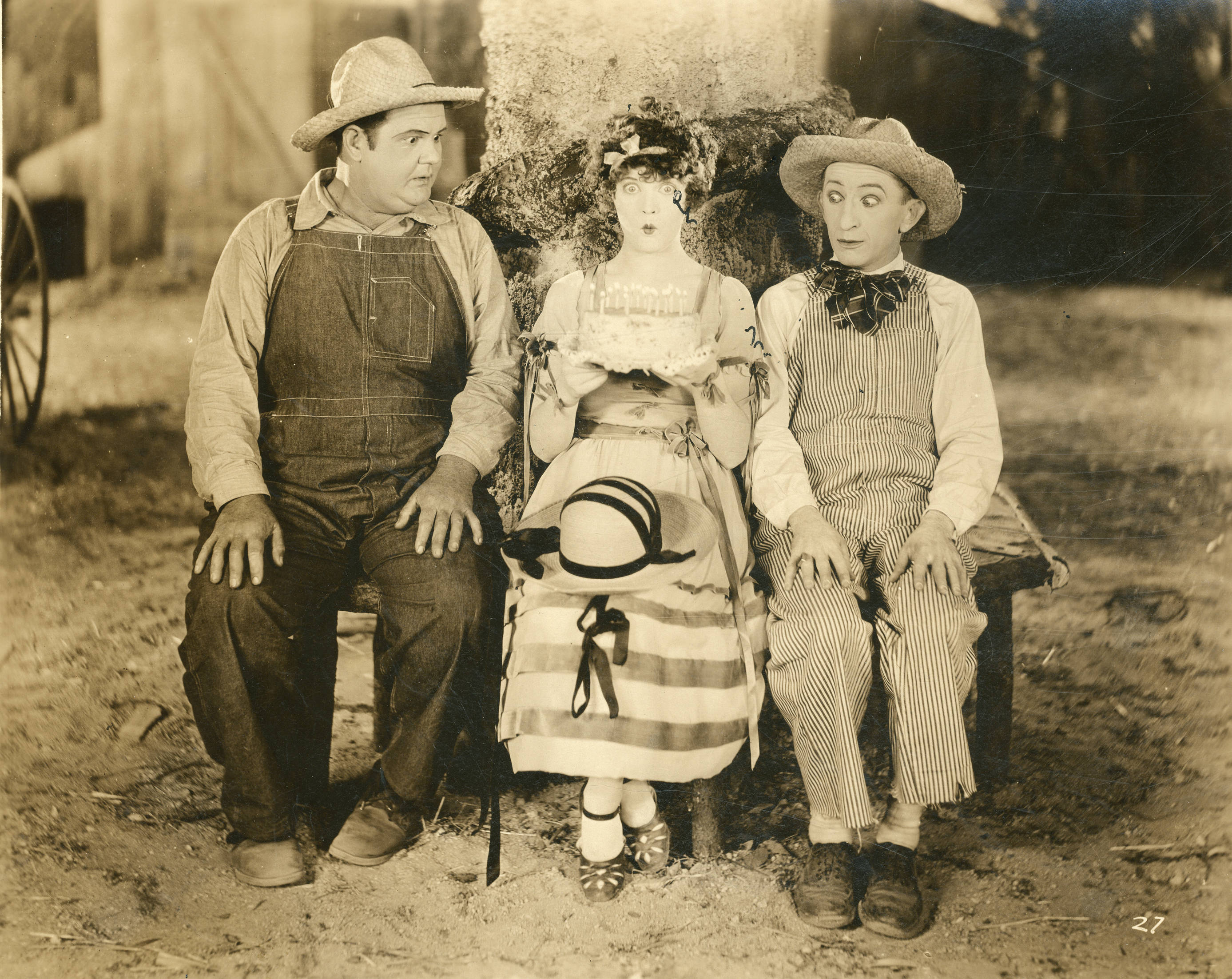
Oliver Hardy, Dorothy Dwan and Larry Semon film still

On her 18th birthday, however, Ambassador Wikked and his henchmen arrive at the farm in an airplane and demand the envelope. When Uncle Henry refuses to hand it over, Wikked persuades one of the farmhands by promising him wealth and Dorothy. Wikked has Dorothy tied to a rope and raised high up on a tower; his men start a fire underneath the rope. The farmhand finds the note, but the other takes it and saves Dorothy, only to have Wikked and his men capture them all at gunpoint.

Then, a tornado suddenly strikes. Dorothy, the three farmhands, and Uncle Henry take shelter inside a small wooden shed, which is carried aloft by the violent wind and deposited in the Land of Oz. Dorothy finally reads the contents of the envelope; it declares that she is Princess Dorothea, the rightful ruler of Oz. Thwarted by her discovering this truth, Prime Minister Kruel blames the farmhands for kidnapping her and demands that the Wizard transform them into wild creatures such as a monkey, which he is unable to do. Being chased by Kruel's soldiers, one of the farmhands disguises himself as a scarecrow, while the other creates a costume from the pile of tin in which he is hiding under. However, they are still eventually captured by the soldiers. During their trial, the Tin Man accuses his fellow farmhands of kidnapping Dorothy. As judgement, Prince Kynd has the Scarecrow put in the dungeon.

Kruel makes the Tin Man "Knight of the Garter" and Wikked suggests he retain his power by marrying Dorothy. The Wizard then helps the two prisoners escape by giving the third farmhand, Snowball a lion costume, which he uses to scare away the guards. Though the Scarecrow manages to reach Dorothy to warn her against Kruel, he is chased back down into the dungeon by the Tin Man, and ends up getting trapped inside a lion cage (with real lions) for a while. He and Snowball finally escape.

When Prince Kynd finds Kruel trying to force Dorothy to marry him, they engage in a sword fight. When Kruel's henchmen intervene and help disarm Kynd, the Scarecrow saves Dorothy and Kynd. Defeated, Kruel claims that he took Dorothy to Kansas in order to protect her from court factions out to harm her, but she orders that he be taken away.

The Scarecrow is heartbroken to discover that Dorothy has fallen for Prince Kynd. He then flees up a tower from the Tin Man, who tries to blast him with a cannon. Snowball flies a biplane overhead, and the Scarecrow manages to grab a rope ladder dangling underneath it. However, the ladder breaks and he falls. The scene shifts abruptly back to the little girl, who had fallen asleep. She wakes up and leaves. The grandfather reads from the book that Dorothy marries Prince Kynd and they live happily ever after.

== Cast ==
- Dorothy Dwan as Dorothy
- Larry Semon as a farmhand / the Scarecrow
- Oliver N. Hardy as another farmhand / the Tin Woodman
- Curtis McHenry as Snowball / the Cowardly Lion (credited in the film as "G. Howe Black", some older sources incorrectly identify this actor as Spencer Bell)
- Charles Murray as the Wizard
- Bryant Washburn as Prince Kynd
- Josef Swickard as Prime Minister Kruel
- Mary Carr as Aunt Em
- Frank Alexander as Uncle Henry
- Virginia Pearson as Lady Vishus
- Otto Lederer as Ambassador Wikked
- Frederick Ko Vert as the Phantom of the Basket

The names of William Hauber and William Dinus also appear in the cast credits at the beginning of the film, but their characters are not cited.

== Production ==
The film departs radically from the novel upon which it is based, introducing new characters and exploits. Along with a completely different plot, the film is set in a world that is only barely recognizable as the Land of Oz from the books. The film focuses mainly on Semon's character, one of three farm hands on Uncle Henry's farm who later becomes the scarecrow, somewhat presaging the 1939 MGM movie. Another major departure from the book is that the Scarecrow, the Tin Woodman, and the Cowardly Lion are not actually characters, but are only disguises donned by the three farm hands after they are swept into Oz by a tornado. Dorothy is eighteen years old, as opposed to the child she is in the book, echoing the 1902 stage version of The Wizard of Oz, in which Dorothy was nineteen years old. In an even more radical departure from the original book, the Tin Woodman is a villain who betrays Dorothy, the Scarecrow, and the Lion.

Some elements of the narrative have their roots in earlier adaptations of The Wizard of Oz. For example, Prime Minister Kruel has a predecessor in King Krewl, the antagonist in the 1914 film His Majesty, the Scarecrow of Oz, and its literary base, The Scarecrow of Oz. The note explaining Princess Dorothea's true heritage is signed "Pastoria", a name used for the exiled King of Oz in the 1902 stage version of The Wizard of Oz, and for the father of Princess Ozma in Baum's 1904 book The Marvelous Land of Oz, as well as in his later books relating to Oz.

Lead actress Dorothy Dwan was Larry Semon's fiancée at the time of its filming. The couple would marry upon the feature's release and remain together until Semon's death three years later in 1928. "L. Frank Baum, Jr." is also given top billing in the film's credits for cowriting the script. That credit refers to Frank Joslyn Baum, Baum's eldest son. Although his actual contribution to the screenplay is doubted by Baum scholar Michael Patrick Hearn, he may have been involved in the business-related aspects of the production.

== Reception ==
According to Ben Mankiewicz, who hosted a televised presentation of the film by Turner Classic Movies in 2018, the production was poorly received by critics and audiences in 1925. However, Mordaunt Hall of The New York Times gave the film a favorable review that year, writing "'The Wizard of Oz' can boast of being the type of rough and tumble farce that sends bright faces from the theatre." The Chicago-based publication Photoplay, one of the first American fan magazines devoted to the film industry, highly recommended the adventure comedy to its large readership in 1925, warning "If you don’t take your children to see this, they will never forgive you." The magazine then adds in its review, "Nothing quite so funny as Larry Semon in the role of the Scarecrow has happened in a long time...and the biggest grouch in the world will get a laugh out of Larry's antics with the lions."

In yet another review in 1925, the New York trade publication Variety described the film as a "corking picture" for children, even though the paper did find the film's overall structure chaotic, some of its scenes far too long or unnecessary, and Semon's use of slapstick gags "hoaked up" and excessive:

Despite Larry Semon must have tried every conceivable manner possible to ruin this picture he has failed to do so and has probably turned out one of the best pictures of all times to take the kids to see. It is a kid picture out and out, and even though it may seem frightfully mixed up to them they certainly laugh themselves almost sick at it. That goes for a lot of kids, some of them four and some of them forty, but the younger were in the majority by far at the Colony [Theatre] Monday afternoon...

Variety summed up The Wizard of Oz in its review by noting that "the laughs are there" and predicted the film would be a box office success for Chadwick Pictures and theater owners, especially outside large metropolitan areas. "In small towns and in smaller cities," the paper stated, "the picture should mop up." Yet, contrary to Variety’s forecast of financial success for the production, Chadwick Pictures went bankrupt during the film's promotion and release, and many theaters did not even receive their reels to show the motion picture. Semon himself never recovered from his own heavy personal investments in the "screen disaster". In fact, he too filed for bankruptcy in March 1928, and when he died at the age of 39 later that year—just three years after the release of The Wizard of Oz—Variety attributed "ceaseless worry" about his dire financial circumstances as a contributing factor to his early death.

== Television ==
The film was first broadcast in 1931 by television station W2XCD of Passaic, New Jersey, owned by the DeForest Radio Company, serialized over the nights of June 8, 9 and 10.

== Home media ==
Since this version of The Wizard of Oz is in the public domain, many home-media releases of the film are available in assorted formats, including Betamax, VHS, Laserdisc, CED, and DVD. It is also available for streaming on the Internet Archive as well as on YouTube. The film is included as well as an extra feature, along with earlier silent films based on the Oz stories, on some home-media releases of MGM's 1939 version of The Wizard of Oz, beginning with the 2005 three-disc "Collector's Edition" of the film.

== Music ==
- The film's premiere in 1925 featured original music orchestrated by Louis La Rondelle, conducted by Harry F. Silverman, featuring Julius K. Johnson at the piano.
- Many home video releases of the film lacked any score, as with many early releases of public-domain silent films.
- The version with an organ score performed by Rosa Rio was made in 1986 for inclusion in the Video Yesteryear edition.
- In 1996, a new version was made. This version was included in all of the home media releases of the film, beginning with the L. Frank Baum Silent Film Collection of Oz, released by American Home Entertainment on November 26, 1996, and features a score performed by Mark Glassman and Steffen Presley and a narration performed by Jacqueline Lovell.
- In 2005, yet another version was made, which features original music composed and arranged by Robert Israel and performed by the Robert Israel Orchestra (Europe), and is included in all of the home media releases of the 1939 film, beginning with the 2005 three-disc Collector's Edition DVD of the film.

== See also ==
- Adaptations of The Wizard of Oz
