= Radiola =

Radiola may refer to:

- Radiola (album), by Skank, 2004
- Radiola (radio station), a station in Paris, 1922–1944
- Radiola (plant), a plant genus in the Linaceae family
- Radiola, the spines of fossil Cidaroida sea urchins
- Radiola, a 1920s line of radios by RCA
- Radiola, a brand name of the French company Radiotechnique
- Radiola Records, LP imprint of Video Yesteryear
