= The Wicked Will Rise =

2015 novel by Danielle Paige

- front cover
- Author: Danielle Paige
- Cover artist: Ray Shappell
- Language: English
- Series: Dorothy Must Die
- Genre: Fantasy
- Published: 2015, HarperCollins
- Publication place: United States
- Media type: print, e-book, audiobook
- Pages: 293 pages
- ISBN: 978-0-06-228070-1
- Preceded by: Dorothy Must Die
- Followed by: Yellow Brick War

The Wicked Will Rise is a young adult novel by Danielle Paige, and the sequel to the 2014 book Dorothy Must Die. It was published by HarperCollins on March 30, 2015. It continues the story of high school girl Amy Gumm in her mission to assassinate Dorothy Gale, who has become twisted and evil.

The book was a best-seller for HarperCollins, who planned a further series of four novels and nine novellas.

== Plot ==
Amy Gumm continues her crusade against Dorothy Gale and Glinda after a failed assassination attempt. After escaping from the burning Emerald City, the flying monkeys Ollie and Maude use their new paper wings in an attempt to carry Princess Ozma and Amy to safety, but they are attacked and their wings are destroyed. Amy uses magic to allow them to land safely. They find the Lion, Amy takes his tail, the source of his courage. The Lion is reduced to cowardice, and Amy spares him.

They encounter wingless monkeys who take the group to the Queendom of the Wingless Ones. Amy meets Queen Lulu, the former guardian to Princess Ozma, who agrees to allow them to stay, but makes it clear that she will not get involved in the war. During the night, Amy meets Pete again and learns that he was unintentionally created by Mombi when she disguised young Ozma as a boy named Tippetarius. Knowing his true identity, she agrees to help him.

Mombi arrives and challenges Queen Lulu, with Amy as the defense. She is able to convince the Queen to allow Mombi to stay. Mombi requests that Amy seeks out Polychrome to assist them in helping the Order slay Dorothy. Amy and Ozma leave the Queendom of the Wingless Ones to find her and are given a gift from Queen Lulu that she stole from Glinda. When the gift backfires and Glinda unexpectedly appears, Amy tries to fight her, but it is revealed that Glinda is only a projection.

Continuing their journey, they arrive in the Land of the Lost and reunite with Nox. They meet a man named Bright who takes the group to Polychrome at the Rainbow Falls. Polychrome offers to fix Ozma, but reveals that the process will kill Pete. Afraid, Pete knocks Amy out and escapes. When Amy awakes, Polychrome’s home is on fire and under attack by Glinda and Dorothy. Pete disclosed their location to Glinda, believing that Glinda would help him. Polychrome, Amy, Nox and Bright lose the fight, and Glinda takes the Tin Man’s heart and the Lion’s tail and leaves with Pete. Polychrome is slain, and Bright flees. Beaten, Nox and Amy leave the Rainbow Falls. Enraged, Amy beats at a wall made out of the Road of Yellow Brick, transforming into a monster, which frightens her, but she is able to change herself back. With the wall destroyed, the group is able to see the other side of the Emerald Palace, where Queen Lulu is waiting. Having had a change of heart about fighting in the war, she tells the group her monkeys were able to capture Glinda, but Dorothy took Ozma into the Palace Maze. Amy and Nox follow them, encountering the Scarecrow who has already had his brains removed. Amy slays him, and continues following Dorothy, but Nox is left behind. When Amy reaches the middle of the maze, Dorothy threatens to destroy Kansas. She then sees the Wizard, who betrays her, taking control of Dorothy and Amy, revealing that Kansas and Oz are technically the same place, but in different dimensional spaces; Oz, in fact, draws some unidentified magic from Kansas that, in turn, leaves Kansas as a dried, un-magical place. The Wizard plans to merge the two, bringing Oz to the regular world, despite the potential chaos, and rule as its King. He is stopped when Pete suddenly separates from Ozma and attacks him, breaking his control of Amy and Dorothy. The Wizard’s plan foiled, Dorothy proceeds to brutally murder the Wizard before the tornado destroys the Maze, taking Dorothy and Amy back to Kansas, where the Witches of the Order are waiting.

== Characters ==
- Amy Gumm: The protagonist of the series. A teenage girl recruited by the Revolutionary Order of the Wicked who had been tasked with the assassination of the evil Dorothy Gale. As the novel progresses, she finds herself tapping into dark magic, which intrigues but sometimes frightens her.
- Pete: A mysterious boy revealed to have unintentionally been created by Mombi when she disguised young Ozma as a boy named Tippetarius.
- Polychrome: The Daughter of the Rainbow. A fairy princess who lives in Rainbow Falls with her pet 'unicorn' Heathcliff.
- Queen Lulu: Queen of the winged and wingless monkeys. She was Ozma's caretaker when she was a baby.
- Ozma: Former ruler of Oz, now a shell of her former self. Has occasional moments of lucidity.
- Glinda: A maniacal witch who is good friends with Dorothy, and very vain.
- Dorothy Gale: A highly sexualized, power-hungry tyrant.
- Nox: Amy's boyfriend, a member of the Order. His parents died when he was young, and he was raised by Mombi.
- The Wizard: An old man with a secret agenda.
- Star: Amy's pet rat. The Cowardly Lion kills her at the beginning of the book.
- Mombi: A crafty old witch and member of the Order.
- Cowardly Lion: A killing machine. Defeated by Amy at the beginning of the book, he reverts to the fearful lion he was in The Wonderful Wizard of Oz. Later in the book, she decapitates him during battle.
- Scarecrow: Former ruler turned henchman of Dorothy. Until Ozma returned he had been a ruler of Oz, although he'd been inept in his job. Later in the book, his brains are stolen by Dorothy and his head ripped off by Amy.

== Reception ==
Kirkus Reviews said, "Readers who liked Volume 1 will be perfectly happy waiting with this sequel for the series climax."

== Sequel ==
A sequel titled Yellow Brick War was released March 15, 2016.
