= Tin Woodman =

Character from Oz series

The Tin Woodman
- Oz character
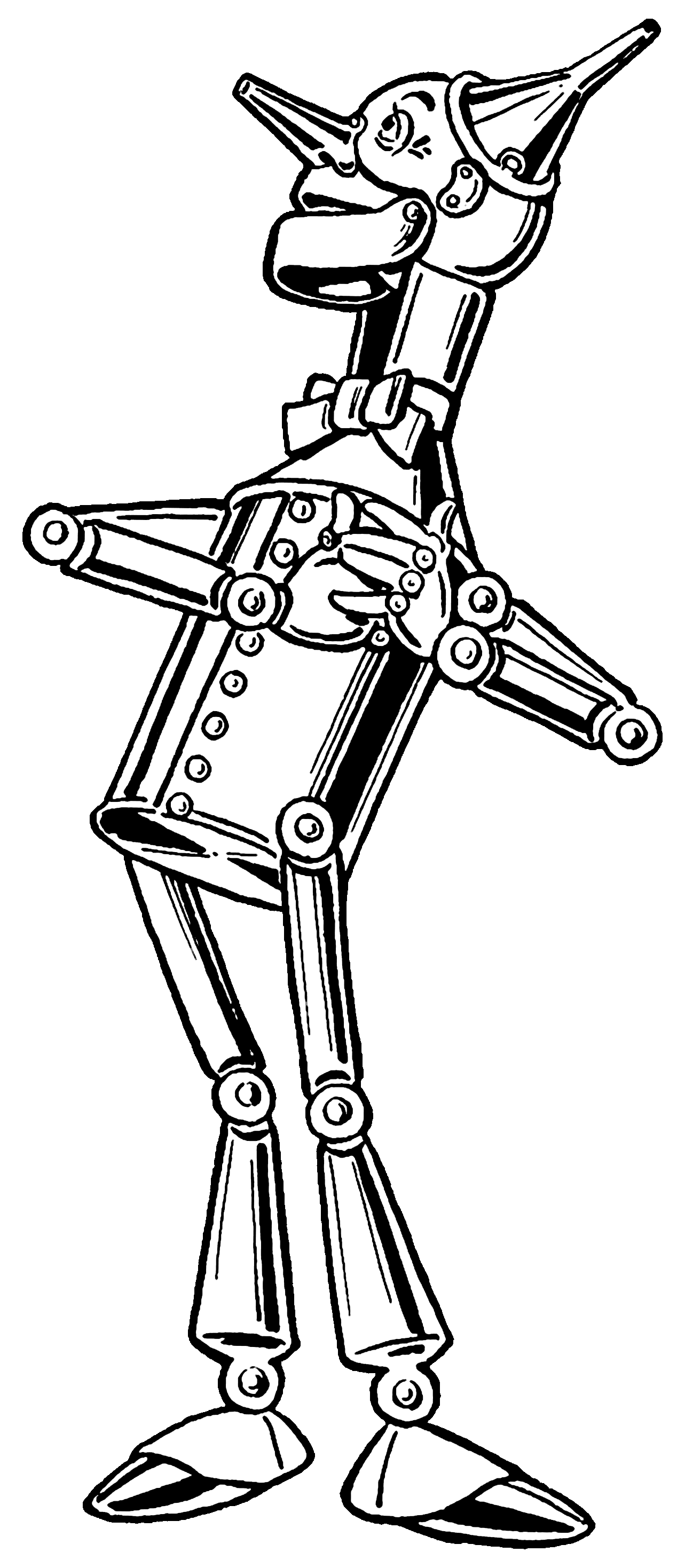
- The Tin Woodman as illustrated by William Wallace Denslow (1900)
- First appearance: The Wonderful Wizard of Oz (1900)
- Created by: L. Frank Baum
- Portrayed by: David C. Montgomery (The Wizard of Oz); George E. Wilson (The Fairylogue and Radio-Plays); Lon Musgrave (The Patchwork Girl of Oz); Pierre Couderc (His Majesty, the Scarecrow of Oz); Oliver Hardy (The Wizard of Oz); Jack Haley (The Wizard of Oz); Donald Burr (The Wizard of Oz); Italo Ricardi (Fantasía... 3); Al Joseph (The Wonderful Land of Oz); Süleyman Turan (Ayşecik ve Sihirli Cüceler Rüyalar Ülkesinde); Tiger Haynes (The Wiz); Michael Carman (Oz); Nipsey Russell (The Wiz); Stephen Boe (The Marvelous Land of Oz); Mussum (Os Trapalhões e o Mágico de Oróz); David Greenaway, Geoff Felix (Return to Oz); Roger Daltrey (The Wizard of Oz in Concert: Dreams Come True); Brent Frank (The Wizard of Oz: On Ice!); Gonzo (Dave Goelz) (The Muppets' Wizard of Oz); Neal McDonough (Tin Man); Edward Baker-Duly (The Wizard of Oz); Orien Richman (After the Wizard); Jordan Turnage, Ross Edgar (Dorothy and the Witches of Oz); Ne-Yo (The Wiz Live!); Gerran Howell (Emerald City); Alex Désert (Once Upon a Time); Yuri Kolokolnikov (The Wizard of the Emerald City (2024 film); Ethan Slater (Wicked: For Good)
- Voiced by: Larry D. Mann (Tales of the Wizard of Oz and Return to Oz); Don Messick (Off to See the Wizard); Danny Thomas (Journey Back to Oz); Jōji Yanami, John Stocker (The Wizard of Oz); Deep Roy (Return to Oz); Takuzō Kamiyama, George Morris (The Wonderful Wizard of Oz); Hal Rayle (The Wizard of Oz); Steve Stoliar (The Oz Kids); Benjamin Salisbury (as the Tin Boy, The Oz Kids); Kelsey Grammer (Legends of Oz: Dorothy's Return); Rob Paulsen (Tom and Jerry & The Wizard of Oz and Tom and Jerry: Back to Oz); J. P. Karliak (Dorothy and the Wizard of Oz); Matthew Kevin Anderson (The Steam Engines of Oz)

In-universe information
- Aliases: Nick Chopper (in the novels); Rusty the Tin Man (Tales of the Wizard of Oz); Greaseball (Oz); The Tin Thing (The Muppets' Wizard of Oz); Wyatt Cain (Tin Man); Boq Woodsman (Wicked: For Good)--->
- Nickname: The Tin Woodman
- Species: Tin humanoid Human (formerly; in the novels, not in the 1939 MGM film The Wizard of Oz)
- Gender: Male
- Title: Emperor
- Occupation: Ruler of the Winkies
- Relatives: Chopfyt (made with some of his human parts)
- Nationality: Munchkinland

Nick Chopper, the Tin Woodman or the Tin Man, is a character in the fictional Land of Oz created by American author L. Frank Baum. He first appeared in his 1900 book The Wonderful Wizard of Oz and reappeared in many other subsequent Oz books in the series. In late 19th-century America, men made out of various tin pieces were used in advertising and political cartoons. Baum, who was editing a magazine on decorating shop windows when he wrote The Wonderful Wizard of Oz, was inspired to create the Tin Woodman by a figure he had built out of metal parts for a shop display.

== Character ==
In The Wonderful Wizard of Oz, Dorothy Gale befriends the Tin Woodman after she finds him rusted in the forest, as he was caught in rain, and uses his oil can to release him. His name was Nick Chopper and he used to be an ordinary woodman, working in the woods of Oz. He was in love with Nimmie Amee, a servant of the Wicked Witch of the East. The witch did not want them to marry, so she enchanted Nick's axe to cut off his limbs. Each limb had been replaced with a tin equivalent and in the end only tin remained. He follows Dorothy to the Emerald City to get a heart from The Wizard. They are joined on their adventure by the Scarecrow and the Cowardly Lion. The Wizard sends Dorothy and her friends to the Winkie Country to kill the Wicked Witch of the West. The Tin Woodman's axe proves useful in this journey, both for chopping wood to create a bridge or raft as needed, and for chopping the heads off animals that threaten the party. When the Wicked Witch of the West sends the Winged Monkeys after the group, they throw the Tin Woodman from a great height, damaging him badly. Winkie Tinsmiths repair him after the death of the Witch.

His desire for a heart notably contrasts with the Scarecrow's desire for brains, reflecting a common debate between the relative importance of the mind and the emotions. This occasions philosophical debate between the two friends as to why their own choices are superior; neither convinces the other, and Dorothy, listening, is unable to decide which one is right. Symbolically, because they remain with Dorothy throughout her quest, she is provided with both and does not need to select. The Tin Woodman states unequivocally that he has neither heart nor brain, but cares nothing for the loss of his brain. Near the end of the novel, Glinda the Good Witch praises his brain as not quite that of the Scarecrow's.

The Wizard turns out to be a "humbug" and can only provide a placebo heart made of silk and filled with sawdust. This is enough to please the Tin Woodman, who, with or without a heart, is the most tender and emotional of Dorothy's companions (just as the Scarecrow is the wisest and the Cowardly Lion the bravest). When he accidentally crushes an insect, he is grief-stricken and, ironically, claims that he must be careful about such things, while those with hearts do not need such care. This tenderness remains with him throughout the series, as in The Patchwork Girl of Oz, where he refuses to let a butterfly be maimed for the casting of a spell.

When Dorothy returns home to her farm in Kansas, the Tin Woodman returns to the Winkie Country to rule as emperor. Later, he has his subjects construct a palace made entirely of tin — from the architecture all the way down to the flowers in the garden.

A recurring problem for the Tin Woodman in The Wonderful Wizard of Oz and afterward was his tendency to rust when exposed to rain, tears, or other moisture. For this reason, in The Marvelous Land of Oz, the character has himself nickel-plated before helping his friend the Scarecrow fight to regain his throne in the Emerald City. Even so, the Tin Woodman continues to worry about rusting throughout the Oz series.

The Tin Woodman appeared in most of the Oz books that followed. He is a major character in the comic page Baum wrote with Walt McDougall in 1904-05, Queer Visitors from the Marvelous Land of Oz. In Ozma of Oz, he commands Princess Ozma's army, and is briefly turned into a tin whistle. In Dorothy and the Wizard in Oz, he serves as defense counsel in the trial of Eureka. He affects the plot of a book most notably in The Patchwork Girl of Oz, in which he forbids the young hero from collecting the wing of a butterfly needed for a magical potion because his heart requires him to protect insects from cruelty. Baum also wrote a short book titled The Scarecrow and the Tin Woodman, part of the Little Wizard Stories of Oz series for younger readers.

In The Tin Woodman of Oz, Nick Chopper finally sets out to find his lost love, Nimmie Amee, but discovers that she has already married Chopfyt, a man constructed partly out of his own dismembered and discarded limbs. For the Tin Woodman, this encounter with his former fiancée is almost as jarring as his experiences being transformed into a tin owl, meeting another tin man named Captain Fyter, and conversing with his ill-tempered original head.

Baum's successors in writing the series tended to use the Tin Woodman as a minor character, still ruling the Winkie Country but not governing the stories' outcome. Two exceptions to this pattern are Ozoplaning with the Wizard of Oz, by Ruth Plumly Thompson, and Lucky Bucky in Oz, by John R. Neill. The biggest exception is in Rachel Cosgrove's The Hidden Valley of Oz, in which the Tin Woodman leads the forces in the defeat of Terp the Terrible and cuts down the Magic Muffin Tree that gives Terp his great size.

The fact that Nick includes the natural deaths of his parents in the story of how he came to be made of tin has been a major element of debate. In The Tin Woodman of Oz (1918), he proclaims that no one in Oz ever died as far back as Lurline's enchantment of the country, which occurred long before the arrival of any outsiders such as the Wizard. Although the living creatures of Oz do not die of age or disease, they may die of accidents or be killed by others.

== The Tin Woodman in later fiction ==
=== Novels ===
- In the 1998 novel The Tin Man, by Dale Brown, the eponymous protagonist is a power-armored vigilante whom the media and police have dubbed "The Tin Man" for his physical resemblance to the Wizard of Oz character.
- The Tin Woodman is a minor character in author Gregory Maguire's 1995 revisionist novel Wicked: The Life and Times of the Wicked Witch of the West and its 2005 sequel Son of a Witch. In the book, the Wicked Witch of the East – the alias of Nessarose Thropp – is seen enchanting the axe to swing around and chop off Nick Chopper's limbs. She does this for a peasant woman who wishes to stop her servant (presumably Nimmie Amee) from marrying Nick Chopper. This seems to be close to the Tin Man's origin in the original books, but from the Witch's perspective.
- In Oz Squad, Nick was shown in a sexual relationship with "Rebecca Eastwitch" in order to get closer to Nimmie Amee and attempt to elope with her.
- A darker twist to the Tin Woodman is made by author James A. Owen in The Shadow Dragons, the fourth installment of his series The Chronicles of the Imaginarium Geographica, when his identity is revealed to be Roger Bacon.
- The Tin Woodman appears as a major antagonist in Danielle Paige's Dorothy Must Die novel series. In this series, Dorothy and her friends have been corrupted by Dorothy's use of magic and the 'magic' in the gifts they received from the Wizard, with the Tin Woodman now driven by a twisted 'love' for Dorothy that is nevertheless unrequited. He is described as possessing a more twisted appearance, with his legs compared to horses' legs and his hands possessing knives for fingers. At the conclusion of the first novel, series protagonist Amy Gumm cuts out his heart, having been informed by the Wizard that she must take the gifts of Dorothy's companions to kill Dorothy herself.

=== Television ===
- In the 1961 animated TV series, Tales of the Wizard of Oz and its sequel, the 1964 NBC animated television special Return to Oz, the Tin Man (here named Rusty) was voiced by Larry D. Mann.
- In the 1970s, the Tin Woodman appeared in a series of short animated educational films about heart health from Joleron Productions.
- In an episode of The World's Greatest Super Friends, Superman temporarily became the Tin Man after a tornado took him, Wonder Woman, and Aquaman to Mister Mxyzptlk's planet of Oz.
- In a 1981 episode of Scooby-Doo and Scrappy-Doo, Scrappy is dressed as the Tin Man after a tornado took him, Shaggy, and Scooby to "Ahz", a direct spoof of Oz with a different spelling by its enunciation.
- The Tin Woodman appears in the Once Upon a Time episode "Where Bluebirds Fly", portrayed by Austin Obiajunwa as a teenager and by Alex Désert as an adult. In this version, he goes by the name Stanum (derived from the Latin word "stannum", which means "tin"). Since youth, Stanum has been a woodcutter and one day when he first met Zelena, the daughter of another woodsman, he finds out that Zelena has magic and befriends her, regardless of whatever the children say about Zelena, who they see as a freak. Many years later, Stanum, now a man, is punished by the Wicked Witch of the North for chopping down a tree in her domain, and his body slowly begins to transform into tin. To prevent himself from completely becoming tin, Stanum seeks out help from Zelena (now the Wicked Witch of the West) at the Emerald City of Oz. Zelena agrees to help him seek out the Crimson Heart, which can save him. During their quest, Stanum tells Zelena that she does not have to be lonely but she is doing her best to deny his advice. Suddenly, a lion comes of nowhere to attack Stanum, and Zelena uses her magic to make the lion go away (at this point the lion has become as Zelena would put it, cowardly). When they finally arrived to the location of the Crimson Heart, the two learned that the only way to make it work is through the absorption of another person's magic. Unfortunately Zelena's actions and selfish greed for magic causes her to betray Stanum, whom she suspect was aligned with Dorothy by keeping the Crimson Heart for herself, leaving Stanum to transform into the Tin Man permanently. Some time later, when Robin Hood arrives in Oz in the episode "Heart of Gold", the Tin Man is seen on the side of the Yellow Brick Road, torn apart.
- In 1996, they made a cartoon animated The Oz Kids. The Tin Man rules the Winkie Country, west of Emerald City and has a son named Tin Boy. Like his father, he can cut wood with his axe and he has to be careful with water and snow or he'll rust. He is voiced by Steve Stoliar.
- James Kall portrayed the Tin Man in the 2001 ABC miniseries Life with Judy Garland: Me and My Shadows.
- Hiroki Tsujiai from Ultra Maniac dresses as the Tin Man in the costume party.
- In the TV series Emerald City, the Tin Woodman equivalent is Jack (Gerran Howell), a friend of the enigmatic Tip, who helps 'him' escape from his imprisonment by a witch. When it is revealed that Tip is actually a girl whose true identity was suppressed by a potion, her strained emotional state causes her to push Jack over a balcony after he kisses her. Jack is subsequently found and rebuilt by scientists in a cyborg-like state; his head and right arm are still organic, but his heart and the rest of his body has been replaced or covered by mechanical armour.
- Although not a direct adaptation to the literature itself, the 2013 Super Sentai series, Zyuden Sentai Kyoryuger features the Deboth Army's members being themed after the characters in The Wonderful Wizard of Oz. Sorrowful Knight Aigallon is designed with the motif of the Tin Man, whose crush on Canderrilla in the series is based on his source of inspiration's desire for a heart. In Power Rangers Dino Charge, he was adapted as Wrench.
- Tin Man appears in Dorothy and the Wizard of Oz, voiced by J. P. Karliak.

=== Stage and screen ===
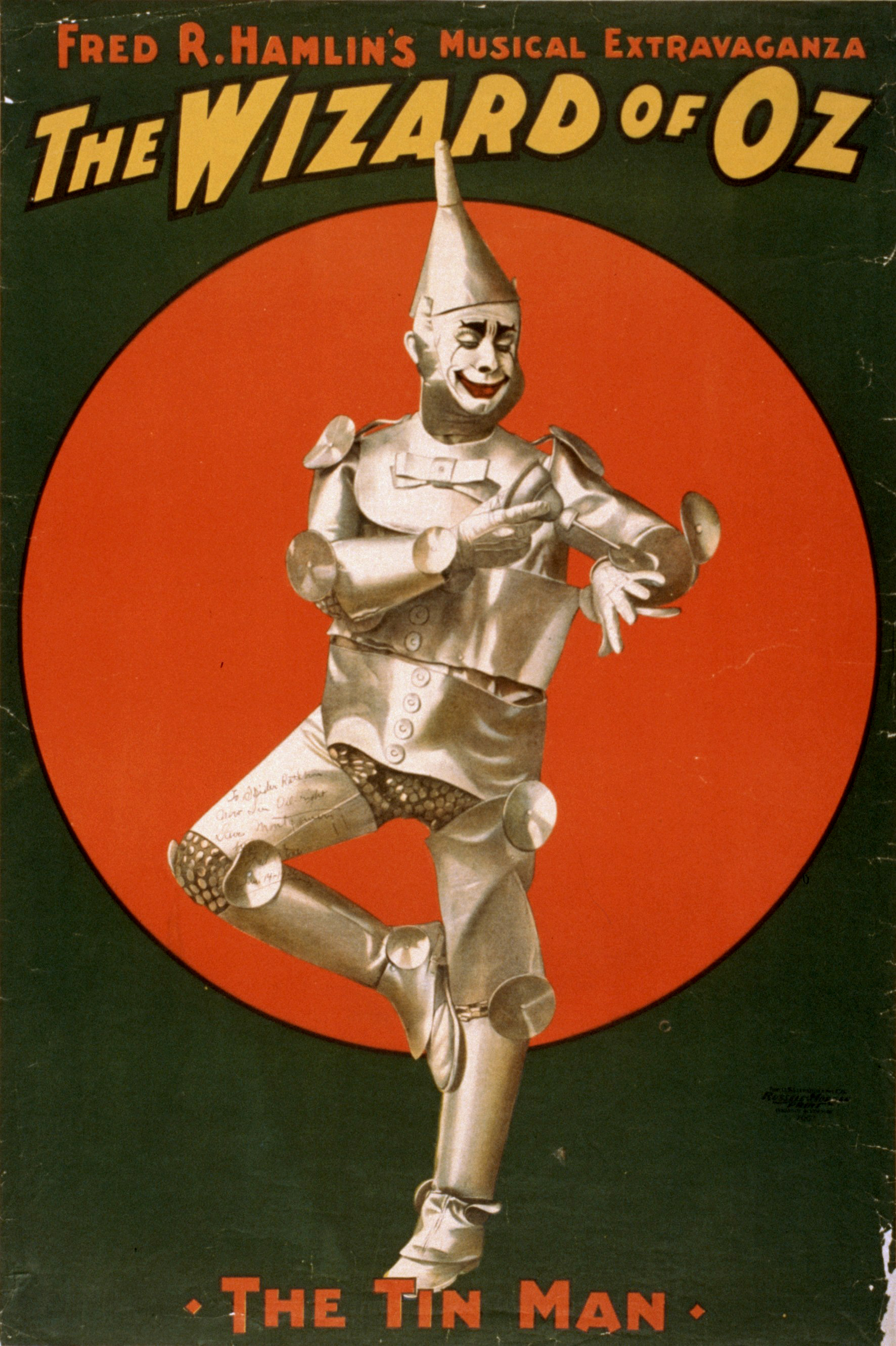
Poster for 1902 stage extravaganza

- In 1902, Baum helped to adapt The Wizard of Oz into a wildly successful stage extravaganza. David C. Montgomery played the Tin Woodman, Niccolo Chopper (who played the piccolo), opposite Fred Stone as the Scarecrow, and the team became headliners. The piccolo would continue to appear in early adaptations, such as the 1910 film, but was largely forgotten, and the name "Niccolo" never appeared in any of the books. Revisionist books like Oz Squad have referred to him as "Nicholas," a name not found in the books, either.

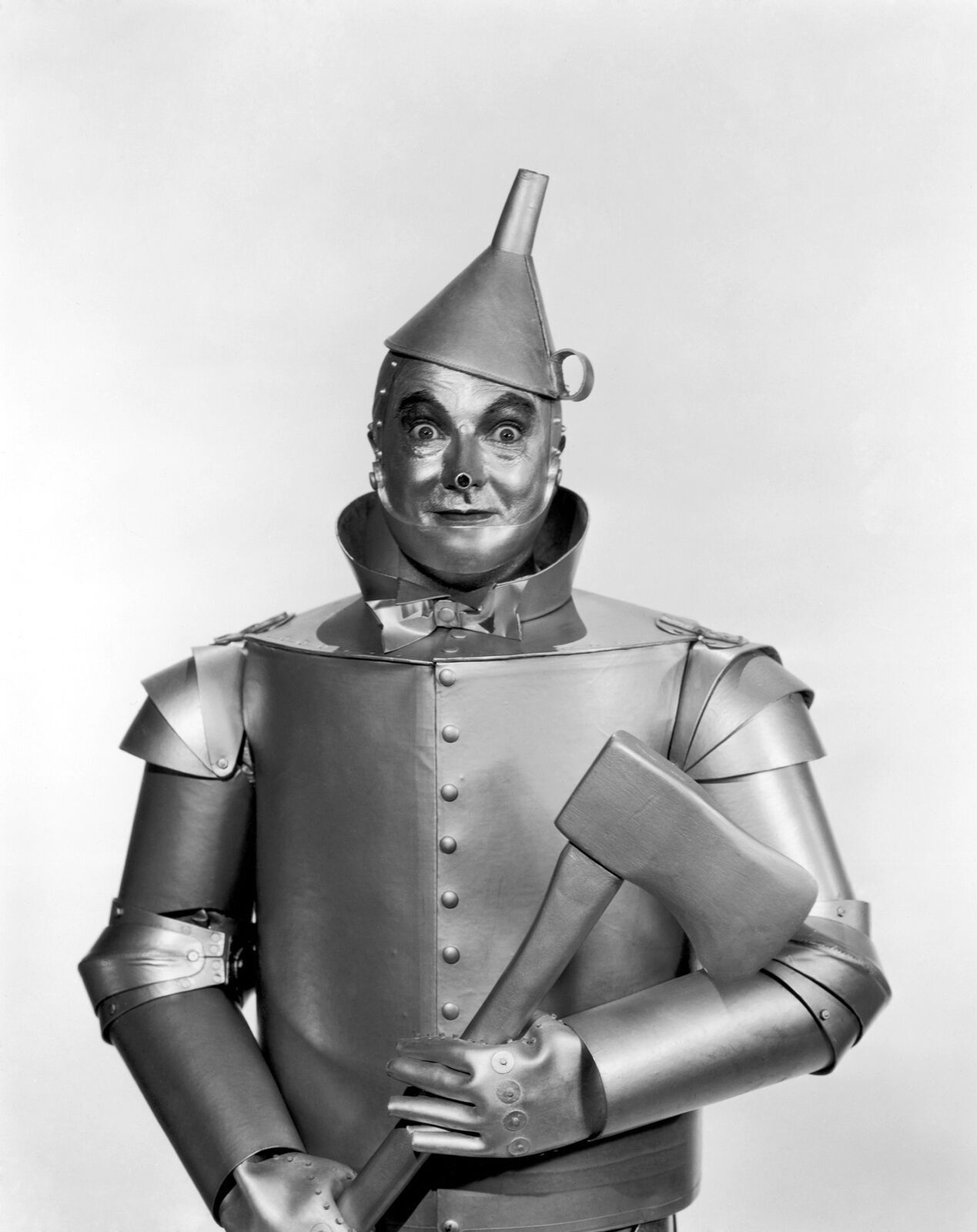
Publicity photo of Jack Haley in costume as the Tin Man for the MGM feature film The Wizard of Oz

- In the 1939 film The Wizard of Oz, the Tin Man was played by Jack Haley. The role was initially intended for Ray Bolger, who traded it to Buddy Ebsen for the part of the Scarecrow. While this switch pleased Bolger, it proved disastrous for Ebsen; the Tin Man's makeup originally contained aluminum powder that infiltrated Ebsen's lungs and caused an allergic reaction, forcing him to give up the role. Ironically, despite his near-fatal experience, Ebsen outlived every major cast member, dying in 2003. Haley based his breathy speaking style in the film on the voice he used for telling his son bedtime stories. His portrayal of the character is by far the most famous. While the film does not give the Tin Man a backstory, his line "The tinsmith forgot to give me a heart" implies that he was always made of tin. Unlike the costumes of the Scarecrow (in the National Museum of American History) and the Cowardly Lion (two sets in private hands), the Tin Man's costume was "largely destroyed". Haley also portrayed the Tin Man's Kansas counterpart, Hickory (one of Aunt Em and Uncle Henry's farmworkers). Screenwriter Noel Langley created this character for the film. Hickory helps Zeke (Lion's alter ego) lower a bed into its place on a wagon at the farm. Unlike Zeke, Hickory and Hunk (Scarecrow's alter ego) lose their hats with Henry as they struggle to open the cellar when the tornado approaches the farm. He reunites with Dorothy when she awakes from being unconscious. Hickory is seen with Em, Henry, Zeke, and Hunk as well as Professor Marvel (The Wizard's alter ego).
- In the original Broadway version of The Wiz, Tiger Haynes played the Tinman as the name was altered, a human woodcutter who became tin after the Wicked Witch of the East cursed his axe to chop him up (as in the book). Nipsey Russell played the Tinman in the film adaptation of The Wiz. In this version, the Tinman was never human, but was created as a mechanical man (thus having more in common with the Oz character Tik-Tok the Clockwork Man). A reference is made to the "genius who created me". He worked as the carnival barker and song-and-dance man. When the park was closed, he was abandoned, rusted and squeezed by his fourth wife, "Teeny" (a heavy tin sculpture of a fat lady). He was saved by Dorothy and the Scarecrow. Ne-Yo played the Tinman in the TV special The Wiz Live!. This version portrayed him as a construction worker on whom the Wicked Witch of the East developed an unrequited crush. When she found out he already had a girlfriend, "Bertha", she became so jealous, she turned him into a heartless tinman. The Witch boasted afterward that if she could not have his heart, then no one could. Like Jack Haley in the 1939 movie, Ne-Yo also played one of Aunt Em's farmhands - John, who walks with a metal leg brace.
- Other notable actors who have played the Tin Woodman include Oliver Hardy in the 1925 silent film The Wizard of Oz directed by and starring Larry Semon, in which a villainous farmhand briefly fell into a tin pile and emerged as a "Tin Woodsman" [sic]. In subsequent scenes the tin was removed and he became "Knight of the Garter". In the 1960 television adaptation of The Land of Oz, he was played by vaudeville comedian Gil Lamb; in the 1969 film, The Wonderful Land of Oz he was played by Al Joseph; and in the 1985 film Return to Oz, he was played by Deep Roy, a little person who was able to fit inside a costume that looked nearly identical to John R. Neill's artwork.
- In 1985, the Tin Woodman appeared in the educational film Act on Arthritis as well as in promotional commercials.
- Roger Daltrey portrayed this character in the 1995 television stage performance The Wizard of Oz in Concert: Dreams Come True. The Kansas farmworker Hickory does not appear in this production. Daltrey performed a rock and roll tempo of "If I Only Had a Heart" in which he swung his microphone mimicking his Who persona. He also performed the bridge verses sung by the Tin Man in Nathan Lane's long version of "If I Only Had the Nerve". Toward the end, he hugged the Wizard (Joel Grey) saying to him "Thank you from the bottom of my heart!".
- In the Wicked musical theatre adaptation, the Tin Man is a composite character with Boq, a minor character from L. Frank Baum's original Wizard of Oz novel as well as Maguire's Wicked. Boq is a Munchkin attending Shiz University who is infatuated with Glinda, but since Glinda herself is infatuated with Fiyero, she instead sets him up with Nessarose. Years later, Boq is a personal servant to a now-Governor Nessarose, who has stripped the Munchkins' rights to keep Boq from leaving her. During a visit from Elphaba (the Wicked Witch of the West), Nessarose gains the ability to walk upright after her shoes are enchanted, and Boq is convinced to leave so he may confess his feelings to Glinda before she marries Fiyero. Enraged, Nessarose attempts to perform a spell from the Grimmerie to make Boq "lose his heart" to her, but her mispronunciations cause Boq's heart to slowly shrink. To save his life, Elphaba intervenes with another spell that transforms Boq into the Tin Woodman. Not understanding her reasons, he pursues Elphaba with a single-minded vengeance for his current form.
  - Boq/The Tin Man appears in the musical's two-part film adaptation, Wicked (2024) and Wicked: For Good (2025), portrayed by Ethan Slater. In reference to the character's fate, his surname is made "Woodsman".
- The Muppet Gonzo plays a similar role, the Tin Thing, in 2005's television film The Muppets' Wizard of Oz. In this version, he is the Wicked Witch's research assistant, transformed into a robot to prevent him wanting a day off to marry Camilla. Gonzo's other role is himself. He appears at the end of this film in the Muppets' show.
- In 2006, the Tin Man was the protagonist in a pair of television commercials for Chef Boyardee ravioli, in a costume identical to the design used in the 1939 Oz film. In the commercials, the Tin Man (played by David Somerville) is pursued by groups of children due to the fact that an oversized Beef Ravioli can label has been affixed to the back of his torso; thus, he appears to be a large, mobile can of ravioli. In the first ad, the Tin Man escapes from his pursuers only to discover that the building he ducked into is an elementary school cafeteria full of hungry children and a teacher. The second ad begins with the Tin Man running through a residential neighborhood, accidentally adding to his pursuers when he stumbles across a backyard birthday party; after fleeing across a golf course (while dodging balls from the driving range), he is cornered in another backyard and threatened with a garden hose (playing on the Tin Man's classic weakness of rusting). As the scene shifts to the image of a Beef Ravioli can, sounds of water hitting metal and the Tin Man's cries for help are heard.
- In 2006, the Chicago Under Ground Film Festival premiered Lee Lynch’s feature film titled Transposition of the Great Vessels, based on the story of his own parents, who moved from Redding to Los Angeles, in hopes of making a better life. His father wanted to work for the forest service, and his mother wanted to be a cook, but their baby was born with a rare heart condition. They were forced to give up those dreams, and make choices that would give them insurance and stability. A naturalist movie interspersed with dream sequences, the “Tin Woodman” makes an appearance while on his deathbed.
- At Sundance of 2007, a film premiered by young director Ray Tintori entitled Death to the Tinman. It is a somewhat modernized retelling that takes place at sometime in the 1900s, in the town Verton, rather than Oz. The book of the same name, which tells the origins of the character, is cited by opening intertitles as the source. Although the basic premise is nearly identical, much of the details and all names and locations have been changed. This is partially due to the film's satirical look at criminal reenactments, as it states at the beginning that names "have been changed to protect the innocent." Perhaps the most interesting change that story makes, though, is the origin of the curse upon the Tinman's Axe, which is changed from being the Witch to being a curse from God. This film won a short filmmaking award at Sundance.
- A 2007 CG animated short film called "After Oz", produced by the film students at Vancouver Film School, centered on a stylized version of the Tin Man, after he has received his heart from Oz. The movie shows him moving through a colorful Oz city with his brand-new mechanical heart, before meeting a reddish female Tin Woman (or robot?) to whom he gives the heart. She proceeds to cruelly play with the heart.
- An internet-collaboration, CG animated feature based on Baum's book The Tin Woodman of Oz was produced by A:M Films, and completed in 2009.
- In 2010, Whitestone Motion Pictures produced a 23-minute live-action short film, Heartless: The Story of the Tin Man. The film is based on the book The Tin Woodman of Oz, where Woot the Wanderer visits the Tin Man and asks how he came to be made of tin. In the film, the Tin Man appears to be more steam- or coal-powered. His chest cavity is covered by a door which reads "Pedudoe Tin Co." but this is a reference to the workings of the film company, and not a reference to any Oz book or material. The movie was made available for free viewing online and free downloading of its soundtrack.
- In the 2013 prequel, Oz the Great and Powerful, although the Tin Woodman does not physically appear, the film introduces his creator, the Master Tinker, portrayed by Bill Cobbs.
- The Tin Man appears in Dorothy and the Witches of Oz played by Jordan Turnage. He appears in the form of a man named Nick (played by Billy Boyd).
- Tin Man appears in the animated film Legends of Oz: Dorothy's Return (which is based on Dorothy of Oz), voiced by Kelsey Grammer.
- In the 2011 direct-to-DVD animated film Tom and Jerry and the Wizard of Oz, the Tin Man was voiced by Rob Paulsen.
- The Woodsman, a 2012 stage musical by James Ortiz, Dr. Edward W. Hardy, and Jay Adana, tells the backstory of the Tin Man, using puppetry, movement, and music.
- Tin Man appears in The Lego Movie 2: The Second Part. Alongside Dorothy and the rest of her friends, Tin Man is transported from the Land of Oz to Harmony Town in the Systar System. He later attends the wedding of Batman and Queen Watevra Wa'Nabi.

=== Video games ===
- The Tin Man appears as an enemy in the 1997 video game, Castlevania: Symphony of the Night along with the Scarecrow and the Lion.
- Tin Man appears in Lego Dimensions, voiced by Dave B. Mitchell.
- In the game Code Name: S.T.E.A.M., Tin Man, along with other Oz characters, is a playable character. His design is more based on Japanese culture and he has the ability to give steam to allies.
- In the mobile tower defense game Arknights, an Operator codenamed "Tin Man" serves as a playable character. With a similar origin to Tin Woodman, Tin Man was also once human (albeit part of the demon-like Sarkaz tribe), having lost his body long ago and now his soul inhabits a bionic metallic body.

== Modern works ==
- Rusting Tin Man, a song about how Nick Chopper becomes the Tin Man, is a track from The Woodsman (Original Off-Broadway Solo Recording) by Edward W. Hardy.
- The song "Country Robot/A Letter to Dorothy" by The Incredible Moses Leroy is written from the Tin Man's perspective; it includes the lyrics "You gave me oil, I was a rusty load/ You even helped me find my heart."
- Joni Mitchell refers to the Tin Man in the song "Tin Angel" on the album Clouds 1969.
- In the song "Tin Man" by the band America, the lyrics state that "Oz never did give nothin' to the Tin Man, that he didn't, didn't already have." The rest of the song has nothing to do with the Tin Man or Oz.
- Country artist Kenny Chesney recorded the song "The Tin Man" for his 1995 album "All I Need to Know".
- Tracy Chapman included a song titled "Remember the Tinman" on her 1995 album New Beginning.
- In the VeggieTales direct-to-video film The Wonderful Wizard of Ha's, the Tin Man and his Kansas counterpart from the 1939 film were played by Larry the Cucumber.
- In the Strawberry Shortcake series, more specifically the 2003 cartoon, the fourth season contains an episode that is a retelling of The Wonderful Wizard of Oz, where Peppermint Fizz, one of the show's characters, plays the Tin Woodsman, whose face now looks more human by the show's standards. The character's appearance is also given more of a peppermint motif to match her theme, and Pupcake calls the result the "Tin Woodsgirl."
- Pitty's 2005 song Na Sua Estante has an official music video that features a heartbroken robot character with a striking resemblance to the novel's illustration of Tin Woodman, wearing a heart-shaped watch like the 1939 film version of the character.
- In the 2007 Sci-Fi miniseries Tin Man, a "Tin Man" is a term used for the law enforcers of Central City in the Outer Zone (O.Z.) One of the story's protagonists, Wyatt Cain (played by Neal McDonough in the title role), is a Tin Man whose past left him hardened and distant from others. In addition, he is first found by Dorothy imprisoned in an iron suit that replays a non-stop loop of the capture of his wife and child.
- The Avett Brothers 2009 Album I and Love and You features a song called "Tin Man".
- Verses of the Future Islands 2010 post-pop, synth-ballad Tin Man contain numerous metaphorical, Tin-Man related references. The song also features a powerful and climactic end chorus consisting solely of the repeated line - "I am the Tin Man".
- A 1990 episode of Star Trek: The Next Generation is titled "Tin Man"; the titular 'Tin Man' is Gomtuu, a massive creature that is basically a living spaceship, whose crew died of radiation poisoning, finding a new crew (and essentially a new heart) in Tam Elbrunn, a powerful telepath who finds peace in Gomtuu's mind.
- The Phineas and Ferb episode "Wizard of Odd" features the Tin Man in his rusted state, but he is never freed from this condition. He is also featured in an end credits song entitled "Rusted".
- Mickey Mouse Clubhouse did a parody special entitled "The Wizard of Dizz", in which the role of the Tin Man is played by Mickey Mouse (as "Mickey the Tin Mouse").

== Sources of the Tin Man image ==
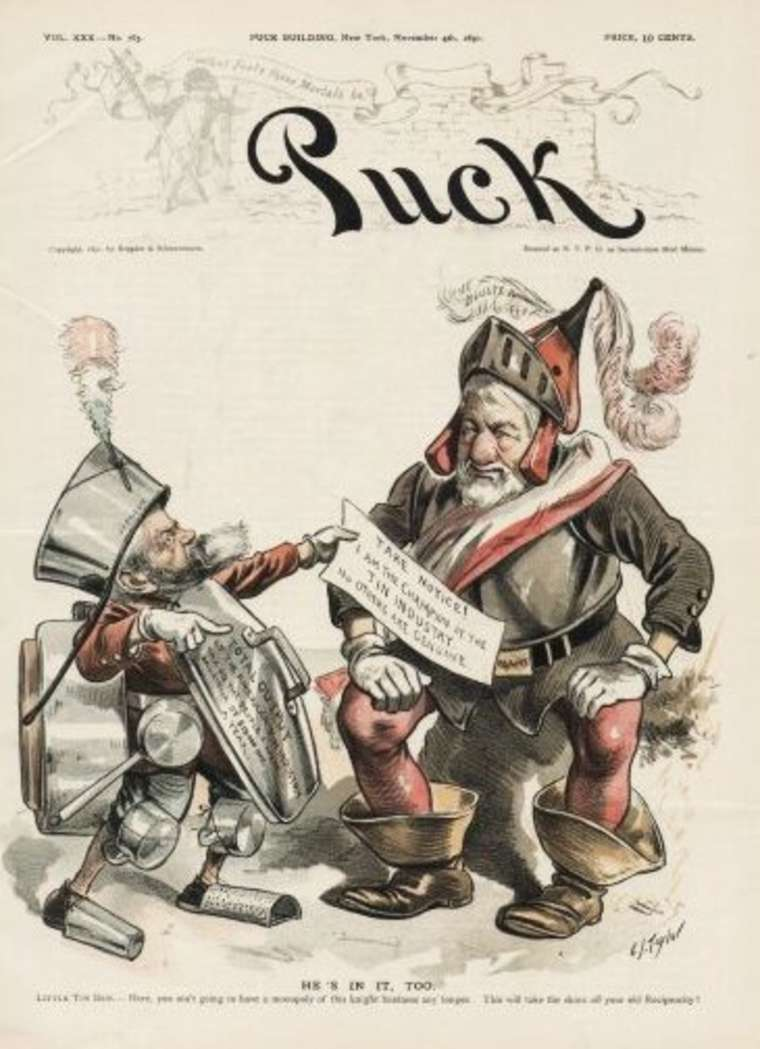
1890 cartoon portraying President Benjamin Harrison as a knight in tin armor

Economics and history professors have published scholarly studies that indicate the images and characters used by Baum and Denslow closely resembled political images that were well known in the 1890s. They state that Baum and Denslow did not simply invent the Lion, Tin Woodman, Scarecrow, Yellow Brick Road, Silver Slippers, cyclone, monkeys, Emerald City, little people, Uncle Henry, passenger balloons, witches and the wizard. These were all common themes in the editorial cartoons of the previous decade. The notion of a "Tin Man" has deep roots in European and American history, according to Green (2006), and often appeared in cartoons of the 1880s and 1890s. Baum and Denslow, like most writers and illustrators, used the materials at hand that they knew best. They built a story around them, added Dorothy, and added a series of lessons to the effect that everyone possesses the resources they need (such as brains, a heart and courage) if only they had self-confidence. The Wonderful Wizard of Oz was a children’s book, of course, but as Baum warned in the preface, it was a "modernized" fairy tale as well.

The Tin Man—the human turned into a machine—was a common feature in political cartoons and in advertisements in the 1890s. Indeed, he had been part of European folk art for 300 years. In political interpretations of The Wonderful Wizard of Oz, the Tin Woodman is supposedly described as a worker, dehumanized by industrialization. The Tin Woodman little by little lost his natural body and had it replaced by metal; so he has lost his heart and cannot move without the help of farmers (represented by the Scarecrow); in reality he has a strong sense of cooperation and love, which needs only an infusion of self-confidence to be awakened. In the 1890s many argued that to secure a political revolution a coalition of Farmers and Workers was needed.

The 1890 editorial cartoon to the right shows President Benjamin Harrison wearing improvised tin armor because he wanted a tariff on tin. Such images support the argument that the figure of a "tin man" was in use as political allegory in the 1890s. The man on the right is politician James G. Blaine.

The oil needed by the Tin Woodman had a political dimension at the time because Rockefeller's Standard Oil Company stood accused of being a monopoly (and in fact was later found guilty by the Supreme Court). In the 1902 stage adaptation, which is full of topical references that do not appear either in the novel or in any of the film adaptations (unless they are satirical), the Tin Woodman wonders what he would do if he ran out of oil. "You wouldn't be as badly off as John D. Rockefeller", the Scarecrow responds, "He'd lose six thousand dollars a minute if that happened."
