= Dorothy Must Die =

2014 novel

- First edition book cover
- Author: Danielle Paige
- Language: English
- Series: Dorothy Must Die
- Genre: Fantasy
- Published: 2014, HarperCollins
- Publication place: United States
- Media type: Print, e-book, audiobook
- Pages: 452 pages
- ISBN: 978-0-06-228067-1
- Preceded by: No Place Like Oz; The Witch Must Burn
- Followed by: The Wicked Will Rise

Dorothy Must Die is a 2014 young adult book by Danielle Paige and her debut novel. The book, which was produced through Full Fathom Five, was released on April 1, 2014, through HarperCollins and was preceded by the novella No Place Like Oz.

== Synopsis ==
Amy Gumm is a high school student living in Kansas and has a dismal life. She is bullied at school for her snarky demeanor, and is neglected by her substance-abusing mother. After her mother leaves to go to a party, Amy's trailer is caught in a tornado and transported to the Land of Oz, but is trapped in a canyon. She is rescued by a mysterious boy named Pete, who tells her to go to the Emerald City. Amy, accompanied by her mother's pet rat, Star, and a punk goth Munchkin named Indigo, learns Oz has been conquered by Dorothy Gale, now a power-hungry, self-proclaimed princess and dictator. Rescuing a crucified wingless flying monkey, Ollie, Amy encounters the Tin Woodman, Dorothy's grand inquisitor and protector, who arrests her and kills Indigo. Ollie flees and abandons them.

Amy reunites with Pete, who claims to be a gardener in the royal palace and tells her she will be rescued. On the night of her "worse than death", Amy is rescued by Mombi, a member of a secret society called the Revolutionary Order of the Wicked, who wish to free Oz from Dorothy's control. The group includes Mombi, Grandma Gert, Glinda's twin sister Glamora, and several teenage warriors including a warlock named Nox who wishes to avenge his family and friends. The Order reveals they recruited Amy to train her in magic and then assassinate Dorothy. Amy agrees and is taught how to use magic by Gert, armed with an enchanted dagger (which Nox made her). The Order attempts to eliminate the Cowardly Lion, now a ravenous monster who absorbs the fear of others, but the attack fails, leading to Gert's death.

The Order move on with their main plan, magically disguising Amy as a maid in the royal palace. They inform her an unnamed agent of theirs will be watching her. Amy, under the alias of Astrid, encounters the delusional Princess Ozma, and learns the Wizard himself has returned to Oz. Amy also encounters Ollie, who has sneaked into the palace to rescue his sister Maude from the Scarecrow, who has become a mad scientist and performs inhumane experiments on Ozians. Amy breaks into the Scarecrow's underground laboratory and rescues Maude, but has to saw off her wings to prevent Dorothy from controlling her. Ollie and Maude flee. The next day, the Tin Woodman searches for the culprit, and Jellia Jamb, Dorothy's handmaid, takes the blame, revealing herself to be Amy's backup. Jellia tries to assassinate Dorothy, but is maimed by the Lion.

A large gala is held in the palace. Amy, working as a waitress still under the disguise of Astrid, discovers the Scarecrow has turned Jellia into a zombie servant. Amy reunites with Nox, who at this point is in disguise as well, and uses the Tin Woodman as a distraction to take Dorothy to her chamber, where she attempts the assassination; but she is thwarted by Toto and the Tin Woodman. As the Order storm the palace, Amy tackles Dorothy over a balcony, but the latter teleports herself safely away using her ruby slippers. Amy is rescued by Ollie and Maude, using makeshift wings, and taken to Pete and the Wizard, who tells her a way to defeat Dorothy is to slay her companions and bring him the brain, heart, and courage he bestowed upon them. The Tin Woodman appears; Amy slays the Woodman, taking his heart before flying away to safety with the monkeys, accompanied by Ozma, who reveals that she is Pete's true identity.

== Main characters ==
- Amy Gumm: The story's protagonist. Amy lives a rough life, such as living with her alcoholic, pill-popping mother and being bullied in school. She's swept out of Kansas with her mother's pet rat, Star, and into Oz by a cyclone. Her sarcastic attitude gets her into trouble from time to time. Amy's surname, Gumm, is an homage to Judy Garland, who portrayed Dorothy in the 1939 movie Wizard of Oz. Garland's real name was Frances Ethel Gumm.
- Madison Pendleton: A girl who has bullied Amy since elementary school and is now pregnant by her boyfriend, whom Amy allows to cheat off her homework. A fight between the two girls causes Amy to be suspended from school.
- Pete: A mysterious young boy who saves Amy when she arrives in Oz and pops in at different parts of the story, actually the male alter ego of Ozma (a.k.a. Tip).
- Indigo: A spirited and bad-tempered goth punk munchkin who meets Amy and leads her to the Emerald City. Indigo's tattoos tell the history of Oz before Dorothy's rule.
- Ollie: A wingless talking monkey that Amy and Indigo save when he's strapped upside down to a pole for the crime of "Sass".
- The Revolutionary Order of the Wicked: A group of witches who have formed an alliance and recruit Amy to kill Dorothy.
  - Gert: The former Good Witch of the North, now a member of the Order of the Wicked. She is the nicest member of the group, encouraging Amy to improve when she initially fails during her training. She dies protecting Amy and Nox from the Lion.
  - Nox: Amy's love interest; a mysterious warlock who is part of the Order.
  - Glamora: Glinda's twin sister, who is the third member of the Order. Her so-called "Good" sister gave her a nasty scar many years ago that Glamora covers with magical makeup. She also taught Amy etiquette skills.
  - Mombi: The fourth member of the Order, who rescues Amy from the Emerald City's dungeon and brings her to the other witches.
- Dorothy Gale: The antagonist of the story. Dorothy is no longer the sweet, kind-hearted farm girl of The Wizard Of Oz. Now she is a highly sexualized, power-hungry tyrant who has proclaimed herself ruler of Oz, sapping the land of most of its magic. Her frequent mood swings and cruel punishments leave her subjects constantly on edge. Though she donned silver shoes during her first time in Oz, she now wears ruby slippers given to her by Glinda that she never takes off, which are the source of both her power and corruption.
- The Scarecrow: No longer satisfied with the brains given to him by the Wizard, the Scarecrow performs barbaric experiments on winged monkeys and takes bits of their brains for himself.
- The Tin Woodman: His tin body is now monstrous, with knives for fingers. Despite his evil actions, he has an unrequited love for Dorothy. She is aware of this, but is disgusted by him.
- The Cowardly Lion: No longer a coward, the Lion is now a blood-hungry, super-buff beast who kills people by literally draining the fear out of them.
- Glinda: The Good Witch of the South, she has aligned with Dorothy and forces young Munchkin children to mine for magic by use of a violent, seesaw-like machine. Her mouth is permanently shaped into a grotesque grin by a new invention called Perma-smile.
- Princess Ozma: The former princess of Oz, whose place Dorothy usurped after her return to Oz. Subjects outside the Emerald City have not seen her in years, but those who live and work in the palace see an Ozma who is vacant and bubble-headed, a shell of her former self.
- Jellia Jamb: Dorothy's top maid. Her sweet, bubbly persona masks a fear of her mistress though she does everything in her power to please her.
- Star: Amy's mother's pet rat. Accompanies Amy in Oz after both of them are taken by the twister.

== Prequels ==
A prequel, No Place Like Oz, was released in e-book format on November 12, 2013 through HarperCollins. The story is set before the events in Dorothy Must Die, but after Dorothy's first trip to Oz. It follows Dorothy as she decides to return to Oz, because she misses the adventure, fame, and vibrancy of the magical world. Her life in Kansas is so lackluster that she returns regardless of the cost to others. Another prequel, The Witch Must Burn, was later published, and a third, The Wizard Returns, was published with the first two in book form in March 2015. The fourth novella, Heart of Tin, was released on July 28, 2015. The fifth novella, The Straw King, was released on November 10, 2015, and the sixth novella, Ruler of Beasts, was released on February 16, 2016. The three were released in a paperback book titled Dorothy Must Die Stories: Volume #2. A seventh novella, Order of the Wicked, was released on June 28, 2016. The eighth novella Dark Side of the Rainbow was published on January 31, 2017.

== Sequels ==
A sequel titled The Wicked Will Rise was published on March 30, 2015, following the events of Dorothy Must Die. The third installment of the series titled Yellow Brick War was published on March 15, 2016. The fourth and final book, The End of Oz, was released on March 14, 2017.

== Reception ==
Nerdist gave Dorothy Must Die a positive review, commenting that "In less skilled hands, all this could make for a trite take on well-worn territory. But Paige gives Amy a strong voice and an even stronger point of view." Kirkus Reviews gave a mostly positive review, stating "In the end, it’s just another violent dystopian series opener for all its yellow-brick veneer, but it’s a whole lot more fun than many of its ilk." A senior editor for the School Library Journal praised the work as being "gory, grim, and fast-paced".

In 2013 The CW was reportedly in negotiations to produce a television series based upon the series. However, no further details have been announced.
