= Rosa Rio =

- Rosa Rio at the Brooklyn Fox (1933–34), started her career as a silent film accompanist
- Born: Elizabeth Raub; June 2, 1902; New Orleans, Louisiana, United States
- Died: May 13, 2010 (aged 107); Sun City Center, Florida
- Education: Oberlin College; Eastman School of Music
- Occupations: Concert pianist; music producer; arranger; silent film accompanist; theatre performer
- Years active: 1912–2010
- Musical career
- Instruments: Wurlitzer theatre organ, Hammond electric organ

Rosa Rio (June 2, 1902 – May 13, 2010) was the stage name of American concert pianist Elizabeth Raub, who also provided scores and arrangement for theater, film productions, radio, and television later becoming a teacher of music and voice.

She started her career as a theatre performer before becoming a silent film accompanist, after which she became a leading organist on network radio and television for soap operas and dramas. In 1993 she reprised her film accompaniment career in Florida, providing the scores for early productions, some of which she had accompanied some 80 years earlier, on their release to cinema.

== Biography ==
=== Early life ===
Rio was born as Elizabeth Raub and raised in New Orleans. She began playing piano at the age of four and started taking lessons at the age of eight. At age ten she played piano at a silent movie theater for the first time.

Post-schooling, she studied music at Oberlin College and at the Eastman School of Music. Her instrument of choice was a Wurlitzer pipe organ.

She married her professor at Eastman, organist John Hammond; they had a son, John Farnsworth Hammond III, who preceded her in death. The marriage ended in divorce. She later married Bill Yeoman, her husband of 63 years. She had three grandchildren, nine great-grandchildren, and a pet snail named Iowa.

Bill Yeoman, her husband, said that Raub adopted the stage name of Rosa Rio because it fitted easily on a theater marquee.

=== Motion Pictures ===
As a theater organist, Rio performed in Syracuse, at Loews Cineplex Entertainment theater's in New York City, at the Saenger Southeastern theater chain, the Scranton Paramount, Brooklyn Fox Theatre, RKO Albee, and the Brooklyn Paramount.

She was working at the Saenger Theatre in her hometown of New Orleans when Al Jolson's film The Jazz Singer was released, signalling the end of the silent film era. Among the films she composed for and provided accompaniment for were The Phantom of The Opera, The Hunchback of Notre Dame and the seminal The Birth of a Nation.

=== Radio ===
Caricature of Rosa Rio reflecting on her career as a staff organist for NBC Radio.

Known as "Queen of the Soaps," Rio worked for 22 years in radio, providing the organ background music for 24 radio soap operas and radio dramas, and playing an average of five to seven shows per day. Some days she went from one program immediately to another—as when Lorenzo Jones and Bob and Ray were adjacent on NBC's schedule during the early 1950s—with less than 50 seconds to run from one NBC studio to another . Some of the programs she played for included Bob and Ray, Ethel and Albert, Front Page Farrell, Lorenzo Jones, My True Story, The Shadow and When a Girl Marries.

During World War II she had her own radio show, Rosa Rio Rhythms, and in between radio gigs was also the accompanist to actress and singer Mary Martin.

=== Television and teaching ===
Rio made a smooth transition into television, playing for shows such as As the World Turns and the Today Show. However, compared to radio, television offered fewer opportunities for work. Rio later moved to Connecticut, where she opened a music school with classes in voice, organ and piano.

=== Video scores ===
During the 1980s, she provided scores and Hammond organ accompaniment to more than 370 silent films released on video by Video Yesteryear.

=== Later career ===
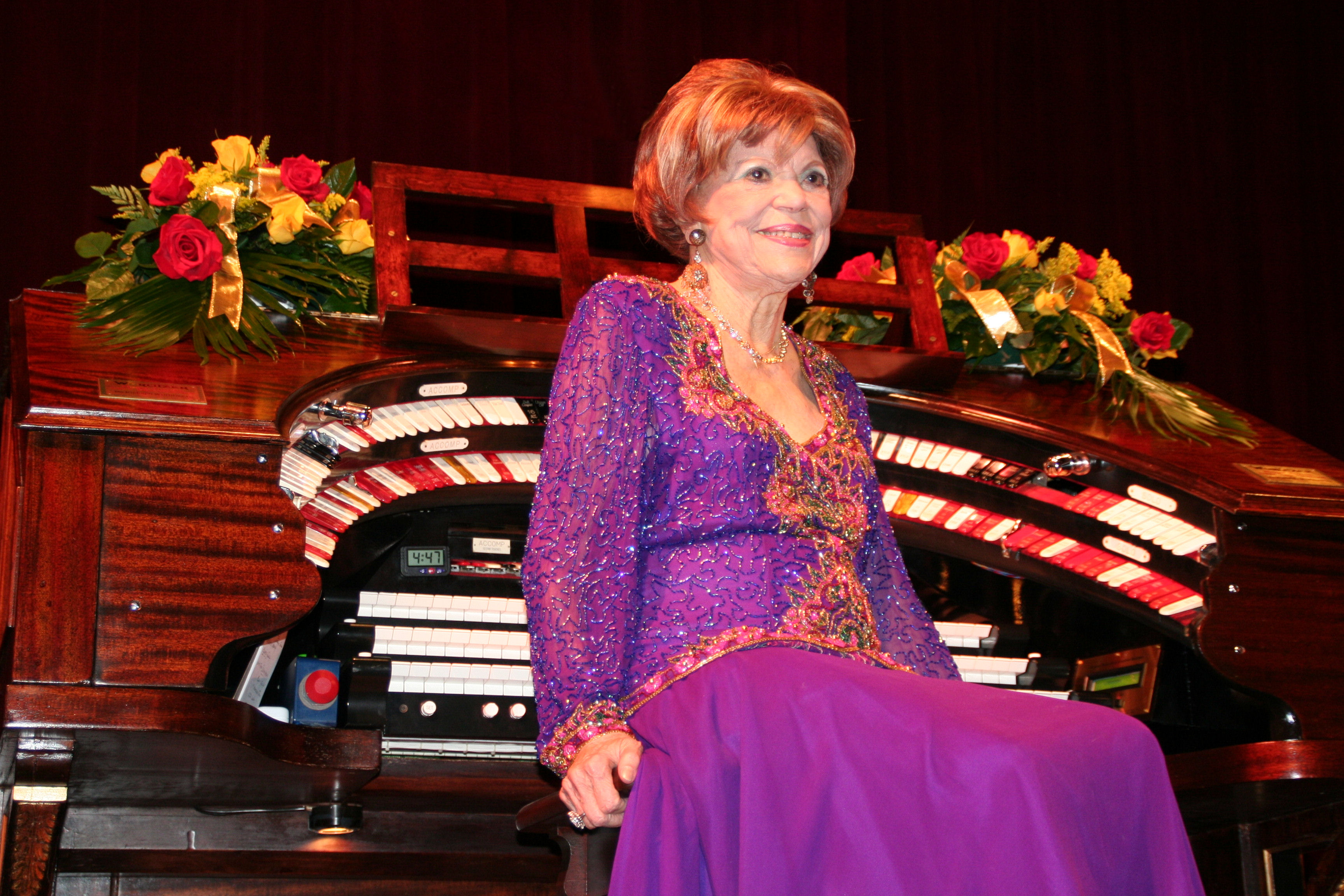
Rosa Rio at the Tampa Theatre Wurlitzer (May 2006)

In 1993, Rio moved to Hillsborough County in Florida, where she played accompaniment to silent films at the Tampa Theatre. She was still providing silent film accompaniment up to her death, including a screening of the Buster Keaton film One Week. It was from the stage of the Tampa Theatre in 2007 that she first publicly gave her real age, which she had kept to herself for decades due to age discrimination dating back to her network radio years. Because Rio never celebrated birthdays, some of her family members were not aware of her age until the night before her Tampa Theatre "confession." She celebrated her 107th birthday in June 2009.

She broke her hip in March 2010 and suffered a bout of influenza; however, she continued to perform on her five-foot grand piano. Rio died on May 13, at age 107. Her organ arrangements remain in print.
