= Scarecrow (Oz) =

Character in L. Frank Baum's Land of Oz

- Oz character
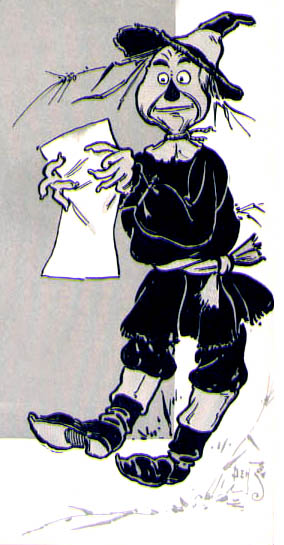
- Illustration by W. W. Denslow from The Wonderful Wizard of Oz
- First appearance: The Wonderful Wizard of Oz (1900)
- Created by: L. Frank Baum

In-universe information
- Aliases: Socrates Strawman; Chang Wang Woe
- Species: Scarecrow
- Gender: Male
- Title(s): His Majesty the Scarecrow; Royal Treasurer; Emperor of the Silver Islands
- Occupation: Ruler of Oz; Tin Woodman's treasurer Corn farmer
- Spouse: Tsing Tsing (in his former incarnation)
- Children: 3 sons 15 grandsons (from his former incarnation)

The Scarecrow is a character in the Land of Oz created by American author L. Frank Baum and illustrator W. W. Denslow. In his first appearance, the Scarecrow reveals that he lacks a brain and desires above all else to have one. In reality, he is only two days old and merely naïve. Throughout the course of the novel, he proves to have the brains he seeks and is later recognized as "the wisest man in all of Oz", although he continues to credit the Wizard for them. He is, however, wise enough to know his own limitations and all too happy to hand the rulership of Oz to Princess Ozma and become one of her trusted advisors, though he typically spends more time having fun than advising.

== Character biography ==
=== In The Wonderful Wizard of Oz ===
In Baum's classic 1900 novel The Wonderful Wizard of Oz, the living scarecrow encounters Dorothy Gale in a field in the Munchkin Country while she is on her way to the Emerald City. He tells her about his creation and of how he at first scared away the crows, before an older one realized he was a straw man, causing the other crows to start eating the corn. The old crow then told the Scarecrow about the importance of brains. The "mindless" Scarecrow joins Dorothy in the hope that The Wizard will give him a brain. They are later joined by the Tin Woodman and the Cowardly Lion. When the group goes to the West, he kills the Witch's crows by breaking their necks. He is torn apart by the Flying Monkeys and his clothes thrown up a tree, but when his clothes are filled with straw he is back again. After Dorothy and her friends have completed their mission to kill the Wicked Witch of the West, the Wizard gives the Scarecrow brains (made out of bran, pins and needles – in reality, a placebo, as he has been the most intelligent of the group all along). Before he leaves Oz in a balloon, the Wizard appoints the Scarecrow to rule the Emerald City in his absence. He accompanies Dorothy and the others to the palace of the Good Witch of the South Glinda, and she uses the Golden Cap to summon the Winged Monkeys, who take the Scarecrow back to the Emerald City.

His desire for a brain notably contrasts with the Tin Woodman's desire for a heart, reflecting a common debate between the relative importance of the mind and emotions. Indeed, both believe they have neither. This philosophical debate between the two friends as to why their own choices are superior; neither convinces the other and Dorothy, listening, is unable to decide which one is right. Symbolically, because they remain with Dorothy throughout her quest, she is provided with both and need not select.

=== Later Oz books ===
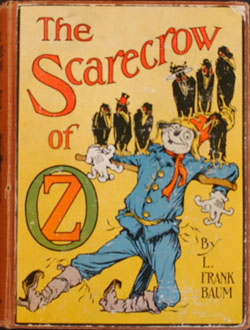
Cover of The Scarecrow of Oz (1915) by L. Frank Baum; illustration by John R. Neill

The Scarecrow appears in other Oz books, such as The Scarecrow of Oz. His reign as king of the Emerald City ends in The Marvelous Land of Oz when General Jinjur and her Army of Revolt oust him in a coup. He manages to escape the palace and joins Tip and his companions in seeking the aid of Glinda the Good. He spars with H. M. Woggle-Bug T. E. on the value of education. Although he claims to be educated himself and to value education, he finds the Woggle-Bug's learning rote and without wisdom. Although he cannot eat, he tells Billina that she might be better cooked and generally seems to favor the use of animals as food, sometimes making snide remarks to that effect to his animal companions, although he himself only gathers nuts and fruit for his traveling companions, such as Dorothy and Tip, to eat.

By The Road to Oz he is acknowledged, at least by the Tin Woodman, to be "probably the wisest man in all Oz," and this is the caption of an illustration, suggesting that the reader take his comment at face value. Dorothy herself, in Dorothy and the Wizard in Oz, praises the Scarecrow's wisdom and says the Scarecrow seemed just as wise before the Wizard gave him brains as after. In The Emerald City of Oz, the Scarecrow lives in a house-shaped like an ear of corn in Winkie Country. In The Scarecrow of Oz, the Scarecrow travels to Jinxland, where he helps Cap'n Bill, Trot and Button-Bright overthrow the villainous King Krewl. In Glinda of Oz the Scarecrow serves as Regent to Ozma of Oz, demonstrating that he is Ozma's third in command. Mostly all he does is play croquet until Ozma's advisers, including himself, band together for a rescue operation.

In The Royal Book of Oz by Ruth Plumly Thompson, Baum's authorized successor as "Royal Historian of Oz", Professor Woggle-Bug accused the Scarecrow of having no ancestry, so he returns to the pole at the cornfield where he was once hung. Sliding down it and descending underground, he first encounters the Middlings and then the Silver Islands, whose people believe themselves to be the ancestors of the Chinese. Apparently, when Emperor Chang Wang Woe defeated the king of the Golden Islands in battle, the king hired a sorcerer to sneak into the palace and transform the Emperor into a crocus, which later sprouted into a bean pole, preceding a prophecy that the first being to touch the bean pole would become possessed by the spirit of the Emperor. As it turned out, the first thing to touch the pole was the straw-stuffed human, which would become the Scarecrow. This account is not consistent with the Scarecrow's story in The Wonderful Wizard of Oz of becoming aware of each sense as the relevant organs were painted on his head.

== Scholarly interpretations ==
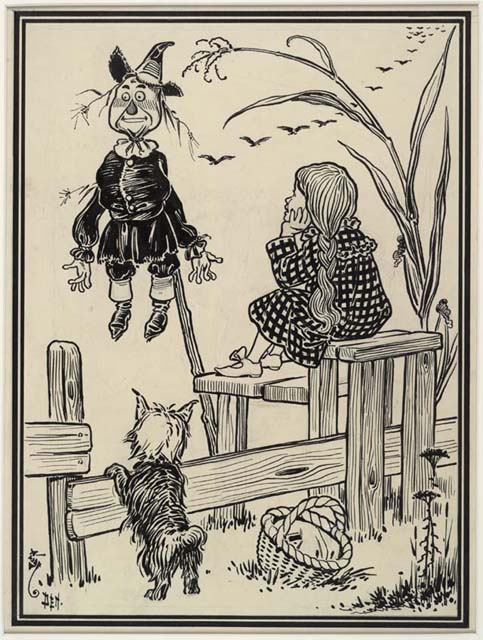
Denslow's drawing of scarecrow hung up on a pole and helpless, from the first edition of the book, 1900

Economics and history professors have published scholarly studies that indicate the images and characters used by Baum and Denslow closely resembled political images that were well known in the 1890s. The Scarecrow, like other characters and elements in The Wonderful Wizard of Oz, was a common theme found in editorial cartoons of the previous decade. Baum and Denslow, like most writers, used the materials at hand that they knew best. They built a story around them, added Dorothy, and added a series of lessons to the effect that everyone possesses the resources they need (such as brains, a heart, and courage) if only they had self-confidence. Although it was a children's book, of course, Baum noted in the preface that it was a "modernized" fairy tale as well.

Those who interpret The Wonderful Wizard of Oz as a political allegory often see the Scarecrow, a central figure, as a reflection of the popular image of the American farmer— although he has been persuaded that he is only a stupid hick, he possesses common sense, logic and a quick wit that needs only to be reinforced by self-confidence.

The blackface minstrel star Fred Stone was the first to play the Scarecrow on stage, and he brought his minstrel style of performance to the role of the Scarecrow. Baum was delighted with Stone's performance, and he wrote subsequent Oz books with Stone's minstrel-style in mind.

== In popular culture ==
=== Television ===
- In the 1961 animated TV series Tales of the Wizard of Oz, and its sequel, the 1964 NBC animated television special Return to Oz, the Scarecrow (here named Socrates) was voiced by Alfie Scopp.
- In an episode of The World's Greatest Super Friends titled "Planet of Oz," Aquaman temporarily became the Scarecrow after a tornado took him, Superman and Wonder Woman to Mister Mxyzptlk’s Planet of Oz.
- In a 1981 episode of Scooby-Doo and Scrappy-Doo, Shaggy is dressed as the Scarecrow after a tornado took him, Scooby, and Scrappy to "Ahz", a direct spoof of Oz with a different spelling by its enunciation.
- Jackson Browne performed this character in the 1995 television special The Wizard of Oz in Concert: Dreams Come True. The Kansas farmworker Hunk does not appear in this production. Browne sang a folk music tempo of If I Only Had a Brain and the bridge verses sung by the Scarecrow in Nathan Lane's longer version of If I Only Had the Nerve.
- In the 1996 The Oz Kids, animated cartoon, the Scarecrow now rules the Emerald City and has a son named Scarecrow Jr. His son is smart and knows everything just like him. Scarecrow Sr. is voiced by Andy Milder.
- The 2003 Strawberry Shortcake cartoon's fourth season has the episode Berry Brick Road, where the titular protagonist gets whisked to the land of Oz. The Scarecrow returns as her first companion, now being played by Ginger Snap and sharing his voice actor with the latter. (Strawberry Shortcake herself plays Dorothy Gale.) The Scarecrow's appearance has been changed to look like Ginger Snap, sporting long pigtails that reach his waist and a jacket just like the one she wears for her default outfit.
- In the 2005 ABC television movie The Muppets' Wizard of Oz, Kermit the Frog plays the role of the Scarecrow. Kermit's other role was himself. Before Dorothy's journey, he organizes a talent scout for a star for a new show. After Dorothy's return, he hires her.
- In the 2007 Sci Fi television miniseries Tin Man, the Scarecrow is re-imagined as the character named "Glitch" (played by Alan Cumming). Formerly a chief adviser to the queen of the Outer Zone (O.Z.) named Ambrose, he resists her usurper (and daughter), the evil sorceress Azkadellia and has his brain removed by the physician as a reeducation measure. In the series, he wanders the O.Z. searching for his brain and becomes a companion of the protagonist, a girl named DG.
- In the 2007 VeggieTales episode The Wonderful Wizard of Ha's, the Scarecrow and his Kansas counterpart from the 1939 film were played by Mr. Lunt the Gourd.
- A commercial for GE smart-grid technology, which first aired during the Super Bowl XLIII, featured a computerized Scarecrow dancing clumsily on a radio tower singing "If I Only Had a Brain".
- In the 2017 live-action series Emerald City, a more modern retelling, the Scarecrow equivalent in the series is "Lucas" (portrayed by Oliver Jackson-Cohen) and is an amnesic man who is rescued by Dorothy when she finds him being crucified at the start of her journey. In the course of the story, it is revealed that he is actually Rowan, the husband of Glinda, with his amnesia the result of a spell Glinda casts so that he couldn't betray her secrets if he was captured, but the restoration of his memory puts him and Dorothy at odds, as his devotion to Glinda leaves him incapable of recognizing Dorothy's real objections to Glinda's extreme methods to train younger witches. Psychologically torn between his memories as Rowan and his new relationships as Lucas, he eventually forces Dorothy to stab him to stop himself strangling her, culminating in Dorothy leaving him strung up like a scarecrow to symbolically reflect his desire to have never met her. Despite this, he appears in Kansas in the season finale, accompanied by Toto, to ask Dorothy to return with him to Oz.
- The Scarecrow appeared in the Once Upon a Time episode "Our Decay", voiced by Paul Scheer. Many years ago, Zelena the Wicked Witch of the West targeted him for his brain as part of her attempt to create a time-travel spell. Before she can remove Scarecrow's brain, Dorothy and Toto arrived where they managed to get away from Zelena. With help from Hades who enchanted a bicycle that was found at the remains of Dorothy's house, Zelena was able to locate where Dorothy and Scarecrow are hiding. After magically freezing Dorothy, Zelena successfully removed Scarecrow's brain and was about to show it to Hades only to find that he is not there.
- Scarecrow appears in the 2017 animated television series Dorothy and the Wizard of Oz, voiced by Bill Fagerbakke.
- Scarecrow appears in Lost In Oz, voiced by Stephen Stanton.
- Although not a direct adaptation to the literature itself, the 2013 Super Sentai series, Zyuden Sentai Kyoryuger features the Deboth Army's members being themed after the characters in The Wonderful Wizard of Oz. The then-Funfilled Spy Luckyulo is designed with the motif of the Scarecrow, who also shares his airheadedness and naivety to his source of inspiration. In Power Rangers Dino Charge, he was adapted as Curio.

=== Live performances ===
- Hinton Battle originated the role of the Scarecrow in the 1975 Broadway musical The Wiz, and Michael Jackson played the Scarecrow in 1978 film adaptation. This version of the Scarecrow was a more tragic character before Dorothy rescues him; while hung on his pole, the crows he is unable to scare, who force him to humiliate himself and entertain them, torment him day and night with their negative and nihilistic worldview, convincing him there's no point in trying to be more than what he is. They force him to sing the song, "You Can't Win", meaning that he cannot escape the crows' rule and his bad luck. While Stan Winston created Jackson's makeup, it was applied to Jackson's face by Michael R. Thomas who portrayed the Scarecrow in Barry Mahon's The Wonderful Land of Oz (1969), as well as doing the makeup for that film. Elijah Kelley portrayed the Scarecrow in the TV special The Wiz Live!, as well as the farmhand Sticks.
- In the 2003 Broadway musical Wicked, based on Gregory Maguire's 1995 novel, the Scarecrow is a composite of the original Scarecrow from The Wonderful Wizard of Oz and the novel-exclusive character Fiyero Tigelaar.
  - In Maguire's novel, Fiyero is a Winkie prince who attends Shiz University with Elphaba and Glinda. As an adult, he begins an illicit affair with Elphaba (now the Wicked Witch of the West), but is murdered by the Wizard's secret police force, leaving behind three children with his arranged wife, Sarima, and a fourth child, Liir, with Elphaba. Later in the novel, Elphaba believes the Scarecrow traveling with Dorothy to be Fiyero in disguise, only to be proven wrong.
  - The stage musical makes significant changes to Fiyero's character and background, now depicting him as a rebellious transfer student whom Glinda is infatuated with. However, Fiyero develops feelings for Elphaba after the two rescue a lion cub from imprisonment. Years after Elphaba becomes a fugitive, Fiyero is now Captain of the Wizard's Guard and reluctantly engaged to Glinda, but he elopes with the Wicked Witch soon after her reappearance. When Elphaba is ambushed in Munchkinland following her sister's death, Fiyero comes to her defense, only to be dragged off and beaten by the guards. Elphaba hastily reads a spell from the Grimmerie to protect him but is unsure if it works, causing her to enter a grief-fueled rage. It is not until the end of the musical that Fiyero is revealed to be alive, having been transformed by Elphaba into the Scarecrow; the two then depart Oz. Fiyero's transformed appearance is based on Ray Bolger's portrayal of the Scarecrow in the 1939 Wizard of Oz film.

=== Films ===
- The Scarecrow has appeared in nearly every early Oz film, portrayed by different actors each time, including Frank Burns in The Fairylogue and Radio-Plays (1908); Robert Z. Leonard in The Wonderful Wizard of Oz (1910); Herbert Glennon in The Patchwork Girl of Oz (1914); Frank Moore in His Majesty, the Scarecrow of Oz (1914); and Donald Henderson in The Land of Oz (1932).
- In the 1925 film Wizard of Oz, the Scarecrow and the Tin Man were actually human farmhands, who were blown to Oz by the tornado along with Dorothy. Dorothy, in another major departure from the novel, turns out to be the rightful ruler of Oz, having been exiled to Kansas as a baby.

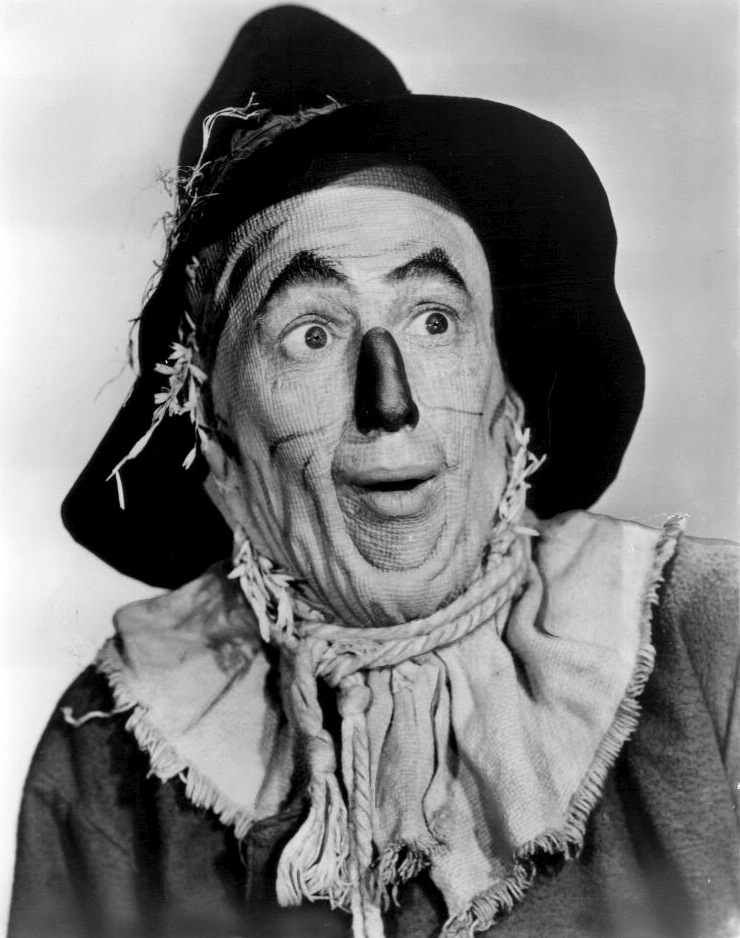
Ray Bolger, The Wizard of Oz 1939

- In the 1939 film The Wizard of Oz, the Scarecrow was played by Ray Bolger in what is arguably the actor's most famous role. He was originally cast as the Tin Woodman, but since Bolger had always wanted to play the Scarecrow, he asked to switch roles with Buddy Ebsen, originally cast in the Scarecrow. Ebsen did not mind the swap. While Ray was pleased with his role as the Scarecrow, the aluminum dust from Ebsen's Tin Man make-up nearly choked him to death (causing Ebsen to have to give up that role). Ebsen was replaced by Jack Haley for his role of the Tin Man. Bolger's costume consisted of a straw-stuffed suit and a light face mask of rubber designed to simulate burlap. The mask was fragile and usually had to be completely replaced at the start of each new day of filming. Bolger's Scarecrow costume, minus the mask, is part of the collections of the National Museum of American History at the Smithsonian Institution. Bolger was a talented dancer, so The Scarecrow was given an extended dance sequence in the movie. However, to shorten the movie, much of this sequence was edited out since it would slow down the pace of the film. While Bolger admitted in a 1939 radio broadcast that he was too young to have seen Fred Stone play the Scarecrow in the 1902 musical extravaganza, he told Stone on the broadcast that the first play he was allowed to see was The Red Mill featuring Stone, and that his performance in that play was an inspiration. During the scene where the Scarecrow gets his "brain" (an honorary Ph.D. diploma) from the Wizard, he incorrectly recites the Pythagorean theorem, emphasizing that the real gift bestowed upon the characters was confidence in qualities they already possess. Bolger also portrayed the Scarecrow's Kansas counterpart, Hunk (one of Aunt Em and Uncle Henry's farmworkers), newly created for the film by screenwriter Noel Langley. A scene which was written in the script, but dropped before filming commenced, ended the movie by sending Hunk off to agricultural college, with Dorothy promising to write. The scene implied the potential for a romance between the two characters. He helps Zeke (Cowardly Lion's alter ego) and Hickory (Tin Man's alter ego) repair a wagon. Unlike Zeke, Hickory and Hunk lose their hats with Uncle Henry as they struggle to open the cellar when the tornado approaches their farm. He closes and locks the cellar with Zeke when Dorothy arrives at the farmhouse. Hunk reunites with Dorothy when she awakens from being unconscious. He is seen with Aunt Em, Uncle Henry, Zeke, Hickory, and Professor Marvel (The Wizard's alter ego).
- In the animated film Journey Back to Oz (produced in 1964 but not released until the 1970s), the Scarecrow was voiced by Mickey Rooney.
- Justin Case, an English bicycle acrobat, appeared briefly as the Scarecrow in the 1985 film Return to Oz. He was turned into an ornament by Nome King. Scarecrow was restored when Dorothy quoted Oz upon touching a green ornament. When Princess Ozma was freed from her mirror prison, Scarecrow allows her to regain the throne.
- In the 2013 film Oz the Great and Powerful, the Scarecrow's origins are explained; being fabricated by the townspeople of Oz as a diversionary tactic during the retaliatory attack on the Emerald City.
- Scarecrow appears in the 2011 direct-to-DVD animated film Tom and Jerry and the Wizard of Oz, voiced by Michael Gough.
  - Michael Gough reprises his role of Scarecrow in the sequel Tom and Jerry: Back to Oz.
- The Scarecrow appears in the 2012 film Dorothy and the Witches of Oz played by Ari Zigaris. He appears on Earth in the form of a man named Allen Denslow who works as the illustrator of Dorothy Gale's books.
- The Scarecrow appeared in the animated film Legends of Oz: Dorothy's Return (which is based on Dorothy of Oz), voiced by Dan Aykroyd.
- Scarecrow appears in The Lego Movie 2: The Second Part. Alongside Dorothy and the rest of her friends, Scarecrow is somehow transported from the Land of Oz to Harmony Town in the Systar System.
- Jonathan Bailey portrays Fiyero Tigelaar/Scarecrow in Wicked (2024) and Wicked: For Good (2025), a two-part adaptation of the stage musical. The character wears blue clothes with ornate patterns to mimic the tribal tattoos of his counterpart from Gregory Maguire's novel. In Wicked: For Good, before Elphaba and the audience learn Fiyero is alive, his Scarecrow form is seen accompanying Dorothy on her journey, though his face is obscured.

=== Video games ===
- The Scarecrow is a playable character in the SNES adaptation of "The Wizard of Oz", released in 1993.
- The Scarecrow (along with his other friends from OZ) are playable in the Nintendo 3DS game Code Name: S.T.E.A.M.
- Scarecrow appears in Lego Dimensions, voiced by William Salyers. During the part of the game that takes place in the Land of Oz, Batman mistakes Scarecrow for his Scarecrow.
- The Scarecrow appears as an enemy in Castlevania: Symphony of the Night along with the Tin Man and the Lion in the Forbidden Library.
- The Scarecrow appears as one of the narrators for the detective quest in Sherlock: Hidden Match-3 Cases, developed by G5 Entertainment in 2020.

=== Comic books and novels ===
- A character inspired by the Scarecrow appears in Alan Moore's Lost Girls. In the work, a young farm boy becomes Dorothy Gale's first sex partner. However, she soon grows bored of him because of his lack of intelligence and imagination, comparing it to having sex with something you use to scare the crows. The "scarecrow" tries to prove to Dorothy that he does have a brain and writes her a poem.
- The Scarecrow is a minor character in author Gregory Maguire's revisionist novel Wicked: The Life and Times of the Wicked Witch of the West.
- The Scarecrow is featured more prominently in Son of a Witch, Maguire's sequel to Wicked. In that novel, the Scarecrow helps the Witch's son Liir avoid political turmoil in the Emerald City after the Wizard's departure. Later, various powerful interests place a different Scarecrow on the throne of Oz to serve as a puppet ruler; the suggestion is that most residents of Oz are unable to distinguish one Scarecrow from another.
- In the 2014 Dorothy Must Die series by Danielle Paige that details a darker depiction of the Land of Oz, the Scarecrow and Dorothy's other companions have been corrupted by their gifts and Dorothy's use of magic. The Scarecrow has become a twisted 'mad scientist', performing various experiments on the animals to turn them into spies or warriors for Dorothy's army, as well as extracting their brains to increase his own. He is 'killed' in the second novel in the series The Wicked Will Rise when the Wizard takes his brains as part of a plan to bring Oz and Kansas together.
- In the pages of Shazam!, Scarecrow is a resident of the location of the Magic land called Wozenderlands. He and the Munchkins find some of the Shazam Family in their part of Wozenderlands. When Billy Batson, Mary Bromfield, and C.C. Batson are teleported to Wozenderlands, they are taken by Scarecrow and the Munchkins to meet with Dorothy Gale. Scarecrow stated that Dorothy Gale and Alice united the Land of Oz and Wonderland to save them from the threats that came from the Monsterlands. They are attacked by Cheshire Cat near the Blue Brick Road that goes through the Queen of Hearts' forest causing Billy and Mary to drive him off. When Mamaragan appeared and also teleported the rest of the foster siblings to Wozenderlands, White Rabbit then gives Scarecrow the ax that belonged to the Tin Man while apologizing for what the Queen of Hearts and her Card Soldiers did to him. When Mister Mind has Shazam cast a spell to unite the seven Magiclands, Scarecrow and White Rabbit start to see the effects of it.

Preceded by The Wizard of Oz	Monarch of Oz	Succeeded by Jinjur
