= Thomas W. Olson =

American children's playwright and lyricist

Thomas W. Olson is an American children's playwright and lyricist who adapted L. Frank Baum's The Marvelous Land of Oz, Mary Shelley's Frankenstein (both of which aired on national television and cable), and Stephen Crane's The Red Badge of Courage presented by the Kennedy Center for the Performing Arts, Washington.

From 1978 to 1990, he was playwright in residence for the Children's Theatre Company (CTC) of Minneapolis, Minnesota, where he also collaborated as an actor in the resident ensemble, stage manager, promotions director, stage director, and literary manager/dramaturg. Most of his plays are literary adaptations, but he also wrote original works, including a piece about The Troubles in Northern Ireland, The Troubles: Children of Belfast (1987). Leaving the staff in 1990 to pursue a freelance career, Olson was literary manager/dramaturg for the Jungle Theater in Minneapolis (1996-98), and managing director for Bloomington Civic Theater (now Artistry) in Bloomington, Minnesota.

Olson has written, directed and performed in "industrial" scripts for organizations, including the American Center for Photography, Business Incentives, Hendlin Visual Communications, Jack Morton Productions, Video Buddy and Minnesota Academic Excellence Foundation.

He wrote eight half-hour radio plays dealing with contemporary urban Native Americans, The Cloud Family Collection, for MIGIZI Communications, with Laura Waterman Wittstock.

Olson has received awards and recognition from the American Theatre Critics Association (Margo Jones Award 1984 with CTC), Twin Cities Drama Critics Circle (1981-83 Kudos Awards as Outstanding Playwright, Outstanding Productions) and Minnesota State Arts Board (1990).

Olson has worked as a consultant to social sector organizations through Stern Consulting International.

== Plays ==
Works commissioned and produced by Children's Theatre Company, Minneapolis:

- The Pied Piper of Hamelin (1978) based on the poem by Robert Browning. Directed by Myron Johnson.
- Hansel and Gretel (1978) based on the folktale by the Brothers Grimm. Directed by Gene Davis Buck.
- The Sleeping Beauty (1979) based on the folktale by Charles Perrault with additional material by John Donahue. Directed by John Clark Donahue.
- The Story of Babar, the Little Elephant (1980) based on the book by Jean de Brunhoff. Directed by John Clark Donahue.
- The Clown of God (1981) based on the story by Tomie dePaola. Music by Steven M. Rydberg, lyrics by Olson. Directed by John Clark Donahue.
- The Marvelous Land of Oz (1981) based on the novel by L. Frank Baum. Directed by John Clark Donahue.
- Pippi Longstocking (1982) based on the novel and Swedish stage play by Astrid Lindgren, with Truda Stockenstrom. Music by Roberta Carlson, lyrics by Carlson and Olson. Directed by Myron Johnson.
- Mr. Pickwick's Christmas (1982) based on chapters from the novel by Charles Dickens. Directed by John Clark Donahue.
- Phantom of the Opera (1982) based on the novel by Gaston Leroux, with George Muschamp. Directed by John Clark Donahue.
- The Secret Garden (1983) based on the novel by Frances Hodgson Burnett. Directed by John Clark Donahue.
- Adventures of Babar (1983) original work based on the characters created by Jean de Brunhoff and Laurent de Brunhoff. Directed by Myron Johnson.
- Frankenstein (1984) based on the novel by Mary Shelley. Directed by John Clark Donahue.
- Kate McGrew and The Mystery of the Tattered Trunk (1985), original work based on a story idea by Wendy Lehr. With Lehr and Richard Russell Ramos. Directed by Richard Russell Ramos.
- Penrod, the Worst Boy in Town (1985) based on the book by Booth Tarkington. Music by Anita Ruth, lyrics by Olson and Ruth. Directed by Jon Cranney.
- The Adventures of Mottel, the Cantor's Son (1986) based on the novel by Sholom Aleichem, with Judith Luck Sher. Directed by Jon Cranney.
- Beatrix Potter's Christmas (1986), original work based on the life and works of Beatrix Potter. Directed by Myron Johnson.
- Dracula (1987) based on the novel by Bram Stoker. Directed by Jon Cranney.
- Merry Christmas, Strega Nona (1987) based on the Strega Nona story by Tomie dePaola. Music by Alan Shorter, lyrics by Olson and Shorter. Directed by Jon Cranney and Tomie de Paola.
- The Troubles: Children of Belfast(1987) original work. Music by Alan Shorter, lyrics by Olson and Shorter.
- The Velveteen Rabbit (1988) based on the story by Margery Williams. Directed by Myron Johnson.
- Sherlock Holmes and the Baker Street Irregulars (1989) original work based on the characters created by Conan Doyle. Directed by Alan Shorter.
- The Hobbit (1990) based on the novel by J.R.R. Tolkien. Directed by Jon Cranney.
- The Jungle Book (1992) based on the story collection by Rudyard Kipling. Directed by Wendy Lehr.
- The Wonderful Wizard of Oz (1993) based on the novel by L. Frank Baum. Directed by Gary Gisselman.
- The Wind in the Willows (1995) based on the novel by Kenneth Grahame. Music by Roberta Carlson, lyrics by Carlson and Olson. Directed by Gary Gisselman.
- Linnea in Monet's Garden (1996) based on the book by Christina Bjork and Lena Andersen. Directed by Wendy Lehr.
- The Prince and the Pauper (1997) based on the novel by Mark Twain. Directed by Marti Maraden.
- Tomie de Paola's Strega Nona (1997) based on the story by Tomie de Paola. Lyrics by Roberta Carlson and Olson. Directed by Wendy Lehr.

Works commissioned and presented by Arkansas Arts Center, Little Rock:

- Lord of the Flies (1988) based on the novel by William Golding.
- The Red Badge of Courage (1991) based on the novel by Stephen Crane.
- The Witch of Blackbird Pond (1992) based on the novel by Elizabeth George Speare.
- Heidi (1993) based on the novel by Johanna Spyri.
- Aesop's Fables (1994) based on the stories by Aesop.
- A Little Princess (1995) based on the novel by Frances Hodgson Burnett.
- The Wind in the Willows (1996) based on the novel by Kenneth Grahame.
- A Glory Over Everything - a tale of Harriet Tubman (1997) based on the life of Harriet Tubman.

Works commissioned and presented by other U.S. theater companies:

- The Secret Garden (1988) based on the novel by Frances Hodgson Burnett. Commissioned and presented by Alliance Theater Company, Atlanta.
- Through the Wheat (1991) based on the novel by Thomas Alexander Boyd. Commissioned and presented by Great American History Theater, St. Paul.
- Hans Brinker and the Silver Skates (1992) based on the novel by Mary Mapes Dodge. Commissioned and presented by First Stage Milwaukee, Milwaukee.
