= Video Yesteryear =

American media distributor

Video Yesteryear, Inc.
- Type: Private
- Industry: Mass media; Retail
- Founded: 1965; 61 years ago in Croton-on-Hudson, New York
- Founder: J. David Goldin
- Defunct: December 1998; 27 years ago
- Fate: Acquired by Audio Book Club, Inc.

Video Yesteryear, Inc., was an American distributor and retailer of public domain films, archival radio shows, and film soundtracks. It was founded in 1965 by J. David Goldin, who originally operated the company from his home in Croton-on-Hudson, New York, before moving to Sandy Hook, Connecticut. Formerly known as Radio Yesteryear, the company distributed old radio shows on LP records, audio cassettes, reel-to-reel, and, for a short time, 8-track tapes. Beginning in 1978, the company began releasing public domain films on VHS, Betamax, and 8 mm film.

== History ==
Video Yesteryear was founded as Radio Yesteryear in 1965 by J. David Goldin (born October 20, 1942), out of his home in Croton-on-Hudson, New York. An enthusiast of radio since childhood, Goldin earned a bachelor's degree in radio production from New York University, where he had worked as a disk jockey at WNYU, the school's radio station. Following graduation, Goldin moved to Sitka, Alaska, where he worked as a DJ and engineer at KSEW, a low-power, multilingual radio station that broadcast in both English and Tlingit. It was at KSEW where he amassed his first hoard of 16-inch transcription discs, taken with permission as the station no longer wanted them. Later, Goldin moved back to New York, where he worked as an engineer for a handful of larger radio companies, including WNBC, WOR, and the CBS Broadcast Center. While working at these stations, Goldin acquired even more transcription discs, either from neglected storage areas or from veteran staff. By the mid 1960s, he had several thousand transcription discs, at which point he decided to found Radio Yesteryear as a mail-order service, selling audiotape copies of his archived transcription discs which he had dubbed to professional reel-to-reel tape.

Also in the late 1960s, Goldin was hired by Viva Records to produce a compilation of 1930s and 1940s radio show theme songs for nostalgic listeners. Titled Themes Like Old Times and released in 1969, the compilation proved highly popular, impacting Variety's top-selling LPs chart at number 23. This won him a contract with Columbia Records to produce W. C. Fields on Radio with Edgar Bergen & Charlie McCarthy (1969), which earned a nomination for Best Comedy Recording at the 12th Annual Grammys. Following these accolades, Radio Yesteryear then began releasing LPs of their own on their Radiola Records imprint. At the 24th Annual Grammys, Radio Yesteryear's remaster of Orson Welles' 1944 reading of Donovan's Brain for Suspense won an award for Best Spoken Word, Documentary or Drama Recording.

Later, Radio Yesteryear formed a second imprint for LPs called Sandy Hook Records. This imprint was designated as a "music-only" label, as opposed to Radiola's focus on complete radio shows. Sandy Hook released music broadcasts and film soundtracks, and reissued commercial recordings that had been out of print for many years. When LPs began to be phased out, Radiola and Sandy Hook became cassette-only formats. Shortly before the sale of the company, they started experimenting with the CD format.

They released "custom tapes" of radio programs from their archive. For $12 per hour, a customer could select shows to add to their own collections. They also began a catalogue of shows called Goldin Radio Library which eventually contained hundreds of preselected shows on cassette.

They also started a cassette/CD reissue series called Stack of 78s that contained recordings from their collection of 78 rpm records. Most of these were out-of-print recordings that had been unavailable for many years. They made no effort at sound restoration; thus, some of the releases had a great deal of scratches and surface noise.

As Video Yesteryear, they are best known for presenting silent films at slower speeds than a standard 16 mm projector would normally show, bringing the early films closer to their silent film running time. This process was known as Video Accu-Speed. Their silent film releases also included original organ scores composed and performed by Rosa Rio (1902–2010), who had been a theatre organist during the silent era. By 1990, Video Yesteryear's catalog number 1,200 films, including 350 silent films.

The company was purchased by Audio Book Club, Inc., in December 1998 for an undisclosed amount.

== RadioGOLDINdex ==
RadioGOLDINdex is an online database of radio programs, from 1922 to 2017, collected and indexed by J. David Goldin, at UMKC Libraries.
