= L. Frank Baum bibliography =

This is a complete bibliography for American children's writer L. Frank Baum.

== Nonestica ==
=== Land of Oz ===
Main: List of Oz books

==== Main series ====
1. The Wonderful Wizard of Oz (1900)
2. The Marvelous Land of Oz (1904)
3. Ozma of Oz (1907)
4. Dorothy and the Wizard in Oz (1908)
5. The Road to Oz (1909)
6. The Emerald City of Oz (1910)
7. The Patchwork Girl of Oz (1913)
8. Tik-Tok of Oz (1914)
9. The Scarecrow of Oz (1915)
10. Rinkitink in Oz (1916)
11. The Lost Princess of Oz (1917)
12. The Tin Woodman of Oz (1918)
13. The Magic of Oz (1919, posthumously published)
14. Glinda of Oz (1920, posthumously published)

==== Plays ====
- The Wonderful Wizard of Oz (18 September 1901)
- The Wizard of Oz (16 June 1902)
- The Woggle-Bug (1905)
- The Tik-Tok Man of Oz (1913)

==== Other works ====
- Queer Visitors from the Marvelous Land of Oz (1905, comic strip depicting 27 stories)
- The Woggle-Bug Book (1905)
- Little Wizard Stories of Oz (1913, collection of 6 short stories)
- "The Littlest Giant" (1917, published 1975, short story)

=== The Forest of Burzee ===
- "The Runaway Shadows or A Trick of Jack Frost" (June 5, 1901)
- American Fairy Tales (1901) (4 of the 15 stories are related to the Nonestica)
  - "The Queen of Quok"
  - "The Enchanted Types"
  - "The Dummy That Lived"
  - "The Ryl of the Lilies/The Ryl"
- The Life and Adventures of Santa Claus (1902)
- The Enchanted Island of Yew (1903) (brief mentions of Ryls and Knooks)
- "A Kidnapped Santa Claus" (December 1904)
- Queen Zixi of Ix (1905)
- "Nelebel's Fairyland" (June 1905)
- "The Yellow Ryl" (1906, published 1925)

=== Trot and Cap'n Bill ===
- The Sea Fairies (1911)
- Sky Island (1912)

=== Other lands around Oz ===
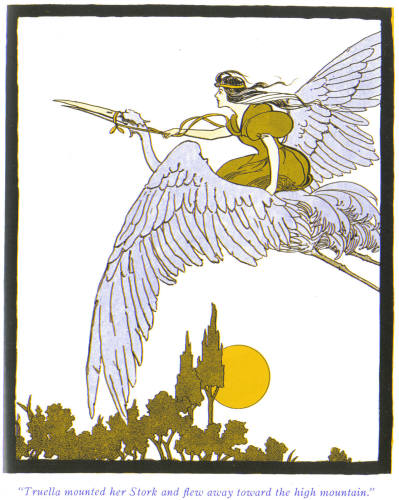
Princess Truella, a character from The Magical Monarch of Mo, illustrated by Frank Ver Beck

- Dot and Tot of Merryland (1901)
- The Magical Monarch of Mo (originally published in 1900 as A New Wonderland) (1903)
- John Dough and the Cherub (1906)

== Fantasy ==
- The Master Key: An Electrical Fairy Tale (1901)
- Animal Fairy Tales (1969) (originally published 1905 as a magazine series)

== Poetry Collections ==
- By the Candelabra's Glare (1898)

=== Geese ===
- Mother Goose in Prose (prose retellings of Mother Goose rhymes, (1897)
- Father Goose: His Book (nonsense poetry, 1899)
- Father Goose's Year Book: Quaint Quacks and Feathered Shafts for Mature Children (nonsense poetry for adults, 1907)

=== The Military Alphabets ===
- The Army Alphabet (poetry, 1900)
- The Navy Alphabet (poetry, 1900)

== Daring Twins ==
- The Daring Twins: A Story for Young Folk (1911; reprinted in 2006 as The Secret of the Lost Fortune)
- Phoebe Daring: A Story for Young Folk (1912; announced for reprint by Hungry Tiger Press as Unjustly Accused!)

== Short stories ==
This list omits those stories that appeared in Our Landlady, American Fairy Tales, Animal Fairy Tales, Little Wizard Stories of Oz, and Queer Visitors from the Marvelous Land of Oz.

- "They Played a New Hamlet" (April 28, 1895)
- "A Cold Day on the Railroad" (May 26, 1895)
- "Who Called 'Perry?'" (January 19, 1896)
- "Yesterday at the Exposition" (February 2, 1896)
- "My Ruby Wedding Ring" (October 12, 1896)
- "The Man with the Red Shirt" (c.1897, told to Matilda Jewell Gage, who wrote it down in 1905)
- "How Scroggs Won the Reward" (May 5, 1897)
- "The Extravagance of Dan" (May 18, 1897)
- "The Return of Dick Weemins" (July 1897)
- "The Suicide of Kiaros" (September 1897)
- "A Shadow Cast Before" (December 1897)
- "The Mating Day" (September 1898)
- "Aunt Hulda's Good Time" (October 26, 1899)
- "The Loveridge Burglary" (January 1900)
- "The Bad Man" (February 1901)
- "The King Who Changed His Mind" (1901)
- "The Runaway Shadows" (June 5, 1901)
- "(The Strange Adventures of) An Easter Egg" (March 29, 1902)
- "Chrome Yellow" (1904, unpublished; held in The Baum Papers at Syracuse University)
- "The Diamondback" (1904, published 1982, first page missing)
- "Jack Burgitt's Honor" (August 1, 1905)
- "The Tiger's Eye" (1905, published 1962)
- "The Witchcraft of Mary–Marie" (1908)
- "The Man-Fairy" (December 1910)
- "Juggerjook" (December 1910)
- "The Tramp and the Baby" (October 1911)
- "Bessie's Fairy Tale" (December 1911)
- "Aunt 'Phroney's Boy" (December 1912)

== Under pseudonyms ==
=== As Edith Van Dyne ===
==== Aunt Jane's Nieces ====
- Aunt Jane's Nieces (1906)
- Aunt Jane's Nieces Abroad (1907)
- Aunt Jane's Nieces at Millville (1908)
- Aunt Jane's Nieces at Work (1909)
- Aunt Jane's Nieces in Society (1910)
- Aunt Jane's Nieces and Uncle John (1911)
- Aunt Jane's Nieces on Vacation (1912)
- Aunt Jane's Nieces on the Ranch (1913)
- Aunt Jane's Nieces Out West (1914)
- Aunt Jane's Nieces in the Red Cross (1915, revised and republished in 1918)

==== The Flying Girl ====
- The Flying Girl (1911)
- The Flying Girl and Her Chum (1912)

==== Mary Louise (aka "The Bluebird Books") ====
- Mary Louise (1916)
- Mary Louise in the Country (1916)
- Mary Louise Solves a Mystery (1917)
- Mary Louise and the Liberty Girls (1918)
- Mary Louise Adopts a Soldier (1919; largely ghostwritten based on a fragment by Baum; subsequent books in the series are by Emma Speed Sampson)

=== As Floyd Akers ===
==== The Boy Fortune Hunters ====
- The Boy Fortune Hunters in Alaska (1908; originally published in 1906 as Sam Steele's Adventures on Land and Sea by "Capt. Hugh Fitzgerald")
- The Boy Fortune Hunters in Panama (1908; originally published in 1907 as Sam Steele's Adventures in Panama by "Capt. Hugh Fitzgerald"; reprinted in 2008 as The Amazing Bubble Car)
- The Boy Fortune Hunters in Egypt (1908; reprinted in 2008 as The Treasure of Karnak)
- The Boy Fortune Hunters in China (1909; reprinted in 2006 as The Scream of the Sacred Ape)
- The Boy Fortune Hunters in Yucatan (1910)
- The Boy Fortune Hunters in the South Seas (1911)

=== As Schuyler Staunton ===
- The Fate of a Crown (1905)
- Daughters of Destiny (1906)

=== As John Estes Cooke ===
- Tamawaca Folks: A Summer Comedy (1907)

=== As Suzanne Metcalf ===
- Annabel, A Novel for Young Folk (1906)

=== As Laura Bancroft ===
- The Twinkle Tales (1906; collected as Twinkle and Chubbins, though Chubbins is not in all the stories)
- Policeman Bluejay (1907; also known as Babes in Birdland, it was published under Baum's name shortly before his death)

=== Anonymous ===
- The Last Egyptian: A Romance of the Nile (1908)

== Miscellanea ==
- Baum's Complete Stamp Dealer's Directory (1873)
- The Book of the Hamburgs (poultry guide, 1886)
- Our Landlady (newspaper stories, 1890–1891)
- The Art of Decorating Dry Goods Windows and Interiors (trade publication, 1900)
- L. Frank Baum's Juvenile Speaker (or Baum's Own Book for Children), a collection of revised work (1910), later republished as The Snuggle Tales (1916–17) and Oz-Man Tales (1920)

== Lost works ==
=== Novels ===
- Our Married Life (1912)
- Johnson (1912)
- The Mystery of Bonita (1914)
- Molly Oodle (1915)

=== Short stories ===
- The first chapter of The Whatnexters, an unfinished novel with Isidore Witmark (1903, Unpublished and possibly lost)
- "Mr. Rumple's Chill" (1904, Lost)
- "Bess of the Movies" (1904, Lost)

== Editor ==
Baum has been credited as the editor of In Other Lands Than Ours (1907), a collection of letters written by his wife Maud Gage Baum.

== Plays and adaptations ==
Michael Patrick Hearn has identified 42 titles of stage plays associated with Baum, including those listed here and on the Oz books page, some probably redundant or reflective of alternate drafts, many for works that Baum may never have actually started. Listed below are those either known to have been performed (such as the lost plays of his youth) or that exist in at least fragmentary or treatment form.

- The Mackrummins (lost play, 1882)
- The Maid of Arran (play, 1882)
- Matches (lost play, 1882)
- Kilmourne, or O'Connor's Dream (lost? play, opened April 4, 1883)
- The Queen of Killarney (lost? play, 1883)
- The Songs of Father Goose: For the Kindergarten, the Nursery, and the Home (Father Goose set to music by Alberta Neiswanger Hall (later Burton), Chicago: George M. Hill, 1900)
- "The Maid of Athens: A College Fantasy" (play treatment, 1903; with Emerson Hough)
- "The King of Gee-Whiz" (play treatment, February 1905, with Emerson Hough)
- Mortal for an Hour or The Fairy Prince or Prince Marvel (play, 1909)
- The Pipes O' Pan (play, 1909, with George Scarborough; only the first act was ever completed)
- The Patchwork Girl of Oz (musical play, 1913; music by Louis F. Gottschalk, revised as the scenario to the film, The Patchwork Girl of Oz|The Patchwork Girl of Oz (film))
- King Bud of Noland, or The Magic Cloak (musical play, 1913; music by Louis F. Gottschalk, revised as the scenario to the film, The Magic Cloak of Oz)
- Stagecraft, or, The Adventures of a Strictly Moral Man (musical play, 1914; music by Louis F. Gottschalk)
- Prince Silverwings (long term project collaborating with Edith Ogden Harrison, based on her book; worked on as late as 1915; published in 1982)
- The Uplift of Lucifer, or Raising Hell: An Allegorical Squazosh (musical play, music by Louis F. Gottschalk, 1915, published privately by Manuel Weltman's Wagon and Star Press, 1963)
- Blackbird Cottages: The Uplifters' Minstrels (musical play, 1916; music by Byron Gay)
- The Orpheus Road Show: A Paraphrastic Compendium of Mirth (musical play, 1917; music by Louis F. Gottschalk)

== The Wizard of Oz on screen and back to stage ==
Early film treatments of Baum's book included 1910 and 1925, as well as Baum's own venture The Oz Film Manufacturing Company. Metro Goldwyn Mayer made the story into the now-classic movie The Wizard of Oz (1939) starring Judy Garland as Dorothy Gale. It was only MGM's second feature-length film in three-strip Technicolor (the first being Sweethearts (1938), based on the Victor Herbert operetta). Among other changes, the film ended by treating the entire adventure as a dream. (Baum used this technique only in Mr. Woodchuck, and in that case the title character explicitly told the dreamer numerous times that she was dreaming.)

A completely new Tony Award-winning Broadway musical with an African-American cast, The Wiz, was staged in 1975 with Stephanie Mills as Dorothy. It was the basis for a 1978 film by the same title starring Diana Ross as an adult Dorothy and Michael Jackson as the Scarecrow.

The Wizard of Oz continues to inspire new versions, such as Disney's Return to Oz (1985), The Muppets' Wizard of Oz, Tin Man (a re-imagining of the story televised in late 2007 on the Sci Fi Channel), and a variety of animated productions. Today's most successful Broadway show Wicked provides a history to the two Oz witches used in the classic MGM film. Gregory Maguire, author of the novel Wicked on which the musical is based, chose to honor L. Frank Baum by naming his main character Elphaba—a phonetic play on Baum's initials.

The film Oz the Great and Powerful (2013) pays homage to MGM's film The Wizard of Oz (1939) and stars James Franco, Mila Kunis, Rachel Weisz, and Michelle Williams.
