= Josef Pierre Nuyttens =

Belgian-American artist and illustrator

- Born: August 7, 1885; Antwerp, Belgium
- Died: January 9, 1960 (aged 74); Chicago, United States

Josef Pierre Nuyttens (also known as Pierre Nuyttens; August 7, 1885 – January 9, 1960) was a Belgian-American artist. He was born in Antwerp, Belgium. His most notable works were his illustrations for four books by L. Frank Baum as well as many portraits of famous people. Currently his art is displayed in many permanent collections such as the Art Institute of Chicago and the National Portrait Gallery at the Smithsonian Institution.

== Biography ==
Nuyttens studied art at the Royal Academy of Fine Arts in Antwerp and the École des Beaux-Arts in Paris, France until 1905. his main skills were in drypoint and etching but worked in a wide array of mediums and subjects. During the 1910s he created illustrations for L. Frank Baum's novels The Flying Girl, Phoebe Daring, Annabel and The Flying Girl and Her Chum and created propaganda posters during World War I. He later received a bronze medal from the then queen of Belgium, Elizabeth of Bavaria and a knighthood from the Order of Leopold in 1918 for his works during the war.

=== Life in the United States (1925–1960) ===
He emigrated to the United States in 1925 first staying in New York City before moving to Chicago in 1934 and had become well known for his work illustrating portraits of notable persons of the day such as Calvin Coolidge, Abraham Lincoln and Thomas Edison. In the 1930s, he became known within the Chicago theatre circuit as a portrait painter of famous performers and as a costume designer for productions of The Swing Mikado and Shakespeare plays. Nuyttens briefly owned a restaurant called the Chez Pierre, predecessor to the more well known Chez Paree, and later had to sell it when local gangsters tried to pressure him into selling bootleg alcohol. During his lifetime, his artwork was exhibited at the White House, the Congressional Library, the New York Public Library, the Royal Palace in Brussels and the Illinois State House in Springfield, IL with much of his work exhibited at the Art Institute of Chicago. Nuyttens also participated in the 1932 Summer Olympics in the art competition submitting two portraits, neither won in the competition. He died on January 9, 1960, in a house fire that destroyed a large amount of his body of work.

== Gallery ==
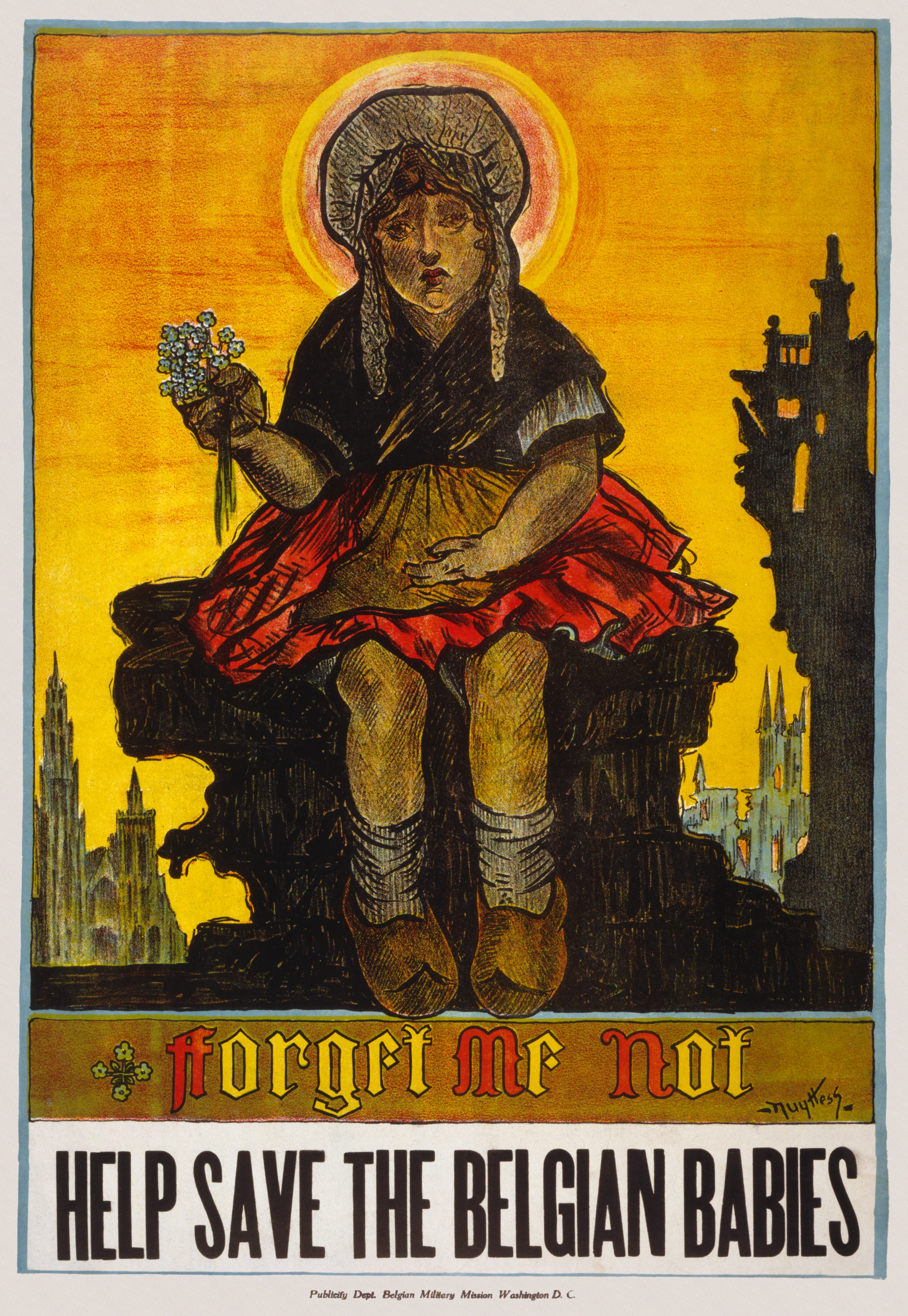
"Forget me not--Help save the Belgian babies" wartime poster, 1917

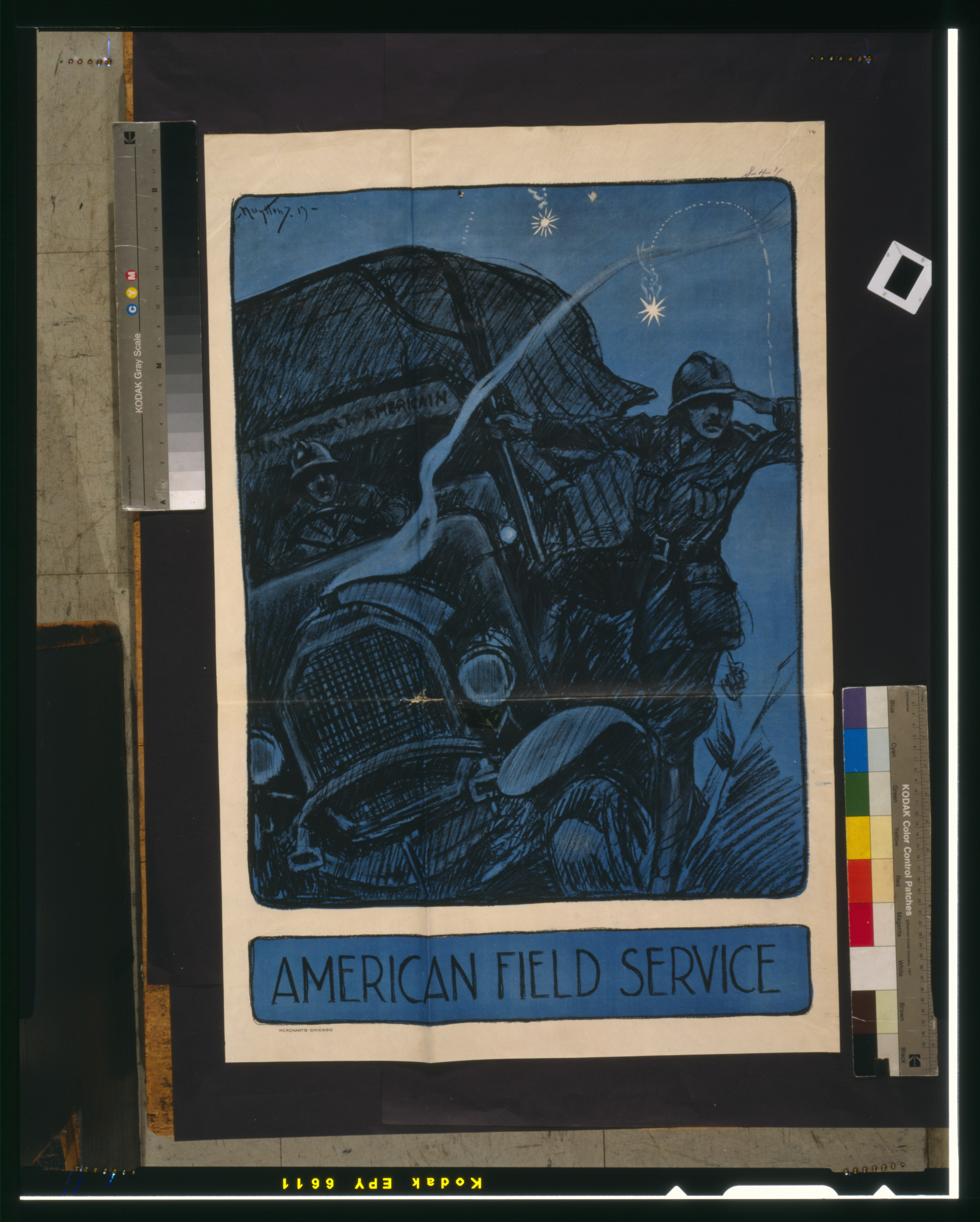
"American field service", wartime poster, 1917

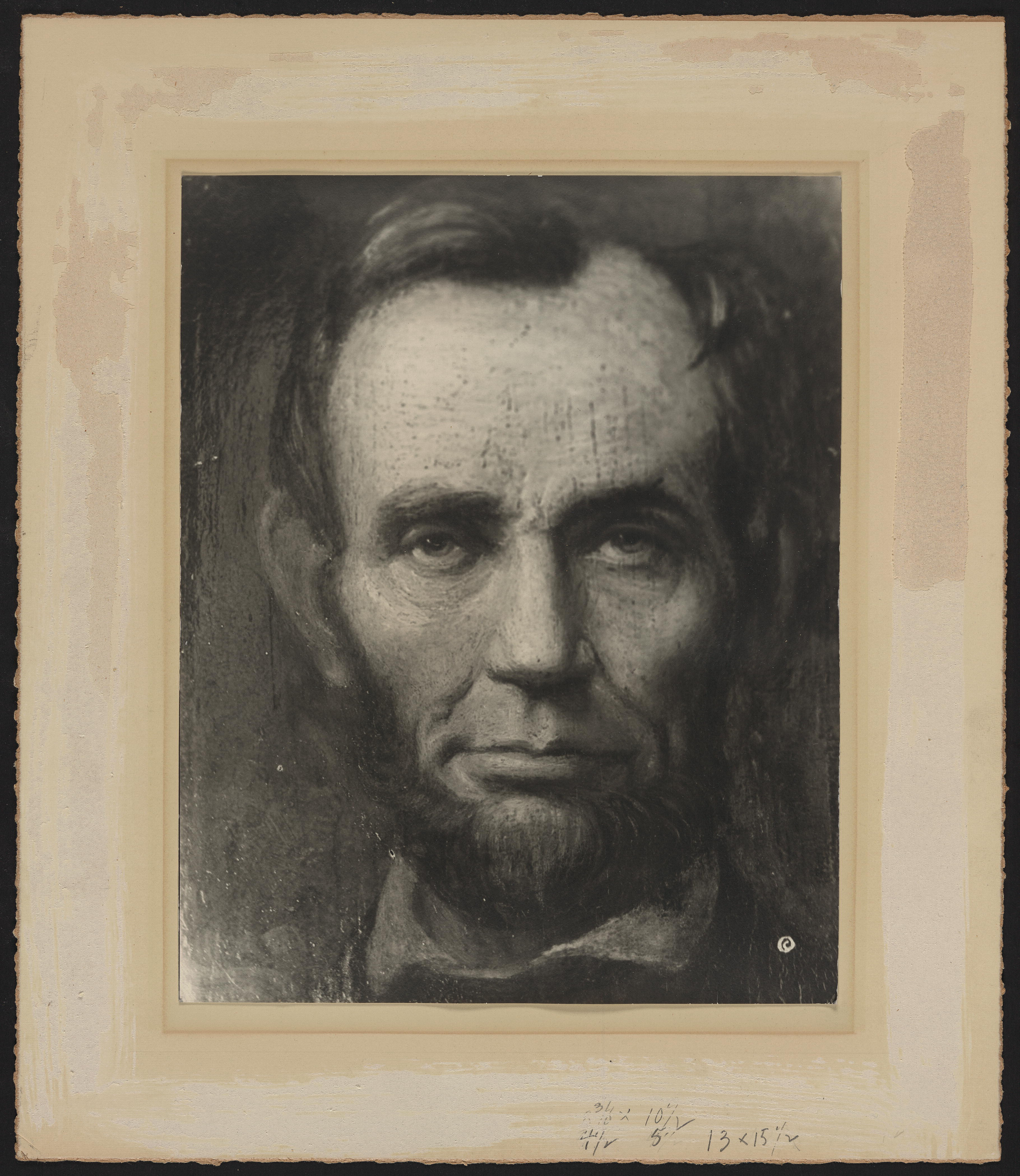
Untitled portrait of Abraham Lincoln, unknown date
