= Little Wizard Stories of Oz =

1914 set of six short stories by L. Frank Baum

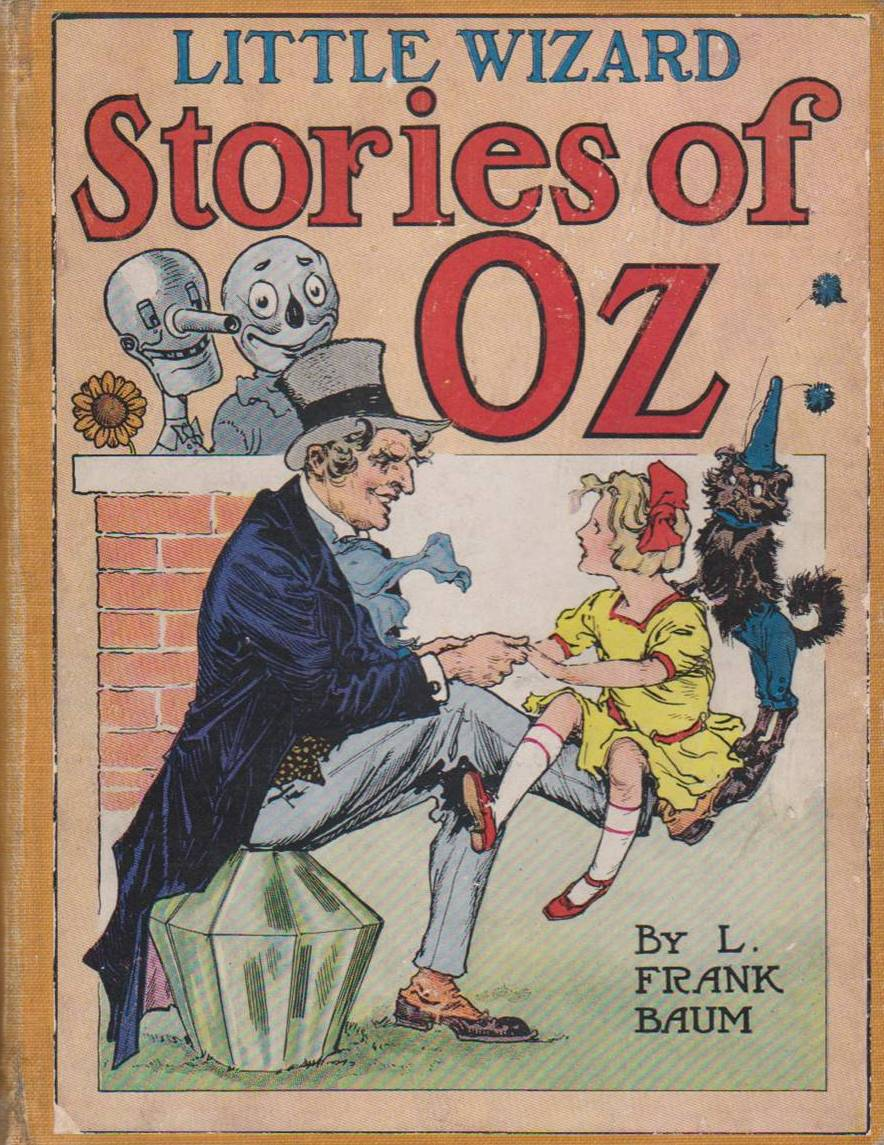
- First edition cover
- Author: L. Frank Baum
- Illustrator: John R. Neill
- Language: English
- Genre: Fantasy
- Publisher: Reilly & Britton
- Publication date: 1914
- Publication place: United States
- Media type: Print (hardcover)

Little Wizard Stories of Oz is a set of six short stories written for young children by L. Frank Baum, the creator of the Oz books. The six tales were published in separate small booklets, "Oz books in miniature," in 1913, and then in a collected edition in 1914 with illustrations by John R. Neill. The stories were issued to promote the new Oz novel, The Patchwork Girl of Oz. Each booklet is 29 pages long, and printed in blue ink rather than black.

== Development ==
The stories were part of a project, by Baum and his publisher Reilly & Britton, to revitalize and continue the series of Oz books that Baum had written up to that date. The story collection effectively constitutes a fifteenth Oz book by Baum.

Baum had attempted to end the Oz series with the sixth book, The Emerald City of Oz (1910). In the final chapter of that book, he sealed off the Land of Oz from the outside world. He began a new series of books with The Sea Fairies (1911) and Sky Island (1912). Also, he reacted to his 1911 bankruptcy by increasing his literary output. He produced five books that year, his greatest output since 1907. Baum tried to launch two other juvenile novel series in 1911, with The Daring Twins, released under his own name, and The Flying Girl, under his "Edith Van Dyne" pseudonym.

None of the new series were as successful as the previous Baum and Van Dyne series; the Oz books and Aunt Jane's Nieces. Both the Flying Girl and Daring Twins series ended with their second volumes, The Flying Girl and Her Chum and Phoebe Daring, both published in 1912. Disappointing sales through 1911 and 1912 convinced Baum and Reilly & Britton that a return to Oz was needed. Baum wrote The Patchwork Girl of Oz for a 1913 release, and in the same year his publisher issued the six Little Wizard stories in individual booklets at a cost of $0.15 each. The goal was to reach the youngest beginning readers, and create in them an interest in the larger Oz canon, as part of a "promotion of L. Frank Baum and all of his books."

== Content and publication ==
The six tales in the Little Wizard Stories are:

- "The Cowardly Lion and the Hungry Tiger"
- "Little Dorothy and Toto"
- "Tiktok and the Nome King"
- "Ozma and the Little Wizard"
- "Jack Pumpkinhead and the Sawhorse"
- "The Scarecrow and the Tin Woodman"

The strategy of reaching beginning readers was successful enough for Reilly & Britton to repeat it within a few years. The publisher released selections from L. Frank Baum's Juvenile Speaker (1910) in six smaller books called The Snuggle Tales in 1916–17, and again as the Oz-Man Tales in 1920.

Four of the Little Wizard Stories were re-issued in 1932 in a new form, as The Little Oz Books with Jig Saw Oz Puzzles. A year or two later the four tales were released again, as part of a promotion for a Wizard of Oz radio program (sponsored by Jell-O). Rand McNally published the six stories in three booklets in 1939.
