= Glen C. Sheffer =

Illustrator (1881-1948)

- Born: 1881
- Died: 1948 (aged 66–67)
- Patrons: The Cumberland Press

Glen C. Sheffer (1881–1948) was an illustrator whose most notable work was a poster for the 1933 Chicago World's Fair. He created illustrations for publications by the Kappa Sigma fraternity, and Frank L. Baum's The Fate of a Crown. Some works have realized over $1000 in recent auction.

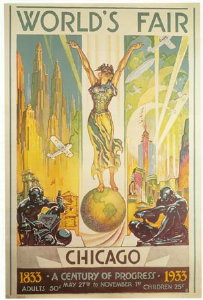
A Century of Progress, the 1933 Chicago World's Fair
