= Animal Fairy Tales =

1969 collection of short stories written by L. Frank Baum

- First edition
- Author: L. Frank Baum
- Illustrator: Dick Martin
- Language: English
- Genre: Fantasy
- Publisher: International Wizard of Oz Club and Opium Books
- Publication date: 1969
- Publication place: United States
- Media type: Print
- Pages: 151 pp.
- ISBN: 0-929605-04-7
- OCLC: 23200754

Animal Fairy Tales is a collection of short stories written by L. Frank Baum, the creator of the Land of Oz series of children's books. The stories (animal tales, comparable to Aesop's Fables or the Just-So Stories and Jungle Book of Rudyard Kipling) first received magazine publication in 1905. For several decades in the twentieth century, the collection was a "lost" book by Baum; it resurfaced when the International Wizard of Oz Club published the stories in one volume in 1969.

== Original publication ==
The nine stories in the collection were printed in consecutive monthly issues of The Delineator (a popular women's magazine of the time) from January to September 1905. The tales were part of the magazine's regular feature, "Stories and Pastimes for Children", and primarily illustrated by Charles Livingston Bull; The Delineator published Baum's story "A Kidnapped Santa Claus" in December 1904 with illustrations by Frederick Richardson, who had begun illustrating Baum's serialized novel Queen Zixi of Ix the previous month in St. Nicholas.

== Failed effort to publish the stories in book form ==
In 1918, as his health declined, Baum focused on preparing manuscripts for future publication in case he died, having favored book publication for his stories. Baum readied three manuscripts, so his publisher (Reilly & Britton) could issue annual Baum books through 1921. Two of those books were the last two in his Oz series (The Magic of Oz and Glinda of Oz), which were published in 1919 and 1920; the third book was Animal Fairy Tales. It is not known why Reilly & Britton did not publish the latter.

== Contents ==
The collection consists of:

- "Prologue" (originally published January 1905)
- "The Story of Jaglon" (January 1905)
- "The Stuffed Alligator" (February 1905)
- "The Discontented Gopher" (March 1905)
- "The Forest Oracle" (April 1905)
- "The Enchanted Buffalo" (May 1905)
- "The Pea-Green Poodle" (June 1905)
- "The Jolly Giraffe of Jomb" (July 1905)
- "The Troubles of Pop Wombat" (August 1905)
- "The Transformation of Bayal the Porcupine" (September 1905)

Of the stories, "The Enchanted Buffalo" is the most-frequently anthologized. The stories were probably written in 1903 and 1904; they resemble other animal tales that Baum wrote during the same period, some of which appeared in his American Fairy Tales (1901), The Twinkle Tales (1906) and as episodes in his novels. Baum's animal tales employ his highly-imaginative style (influenced by his interest in theosophy), and differ from the more-naturalistic tales of contemporaries such as Albert Bigelow Paine. In "The Story of Jaglon," for example, an orphaned tiger is raised by "tiger fairies." In 1953, Oz author Jack Snow's expansion of this story (entitled Jaglon and the Tiger Fairies) was published with illustrations by Dale Ulrey. This was the first in a series of expanded versions of all nine stories planned by Reilly & Lee, but the other eight were never published.

Baum wrote another story for the collection; entitled "The Tiger's Eye", it is a grim, harsh story about evil magic enchanting animals and men which was not printed until 1962. Another edition of Animal Fairy Tales, including the original illustrations by Charles Bull, appeared in 1992.
