= The Fate of a Crown =

1905 adventure novel written by L. Frank Baum

- First edition
- Author: L. Frank Baum (as "Schuyler Staunton")
- Illustrator: Glen C. Sheffer
- Language: English
- Genre: Adventure fiction
- Publisher: Reilly & Britton
- Publication date: 1905
- Publication place: United States
- Media type: Print (hardcover)
- Pages: 306 pp.

The Fate of a Crown is a 1905 adventure novel written by L. Frank Baum, the author best known for his Oz books. It was published under the pen name "Schuyler Staunton", one of Baum's several pseudonyms. (Baum arrived at the name by adding one letter to the name of his late maternal uncle Schuyler Stanton.)

== Audience ==
In the years just before and after 1900, Baum had established himself as a successful author of children's books. He then set out to expand his audience in three potentially lucrative areas: adult fiction and juvenile fiction for girls and for boys. The Fate of a Crown was his first endeavor for the adult audience. In 1906 he published Annabel and Aunt Jane's Nieces, juvenile novels for girls, and Sam Steele's Adventures on Land and Sea, a book for boys. (Each of these books was issued under a different pseudonym.)

In The Fate of a Crown, Baum wrote an adventure novel that combines elements of political intrigue, melodrama, and mystery story. He set the book in Brazil in 1889, during the revolution that brought the Empire of Brazil to its end. Baum chose the rather daring strategy of including major historical figures of the period, Manuel Deodoro da Fonseca, Floriano Peixoto, and even Emperor Pedro II, as characters in his fiction. (This may have been an additional good reason for releasing the novel under a pen name.)

== Story ==
The novel's protagonist is a young American named Robert Harcliffe; a recent college graduate, he works for his family's mercantile business in New Orleans, run by his Uncle Nelson. Nelson Harcliffe receives a letter from an old client in Brazil, Dom Miguel de Pintra, a wealthy man who has retired from business to devote himself to politics – specifically to the republican cause that struggles to replace the Brazilian Empire. Dom Miguel has written to request a secretary; Robert, eager for adventure, agrees to take the job.

Robert's attitude is devil-may-care at first, yet he quickly learns that he has entered into a dangerous enterprise. He cleverly evades a murderous spy on the voyage down to Rio de Janeiro; but as soon as he reaches the city he is arrested by the police. In the carriage taking him to the police station, the lieutenant in charge is murdered by his own sergeant, who is a republican sympathizer. The sergeant and other sympathizers guide Harcliffe to the city of Cuyaba in Matto Grosso state, and to Dom Miguel's plantation.

There, Harcliffe quickly becomes a devoted admirer of de Pintra and a republican sympathizer himself. (Baum presents this as an American's natural preference, over the archaic, authoritarian, European imperial system.) Just as quickly, Robert learns that the circle around the republican leader is fraught with uncertainty. The man's daughter Izabel is cold and suspect, while his ward Lesba is an ardent republican, and a beauty with whom Harcliffe soon falls in love. Lesba's brother appears to be a republican too – yet he serves as the Emperor's minister of police. Harcliffe wrestles with question of who can be trusted, and who is playing a "double game".

The mystery aspects of the story center on the massive steel vault, impregnated with nitro glycerin, that is hidden in a sub-basement of de Pintra's mansion. It holds the treasury and the incriminating records of the republican movement; it opens with an exotic key, a specially-cut emerald in Dom Miguel's ring. The ring is stolen, which leads Harcliffe on a challenging and puzzling chase.

As the revolution starts, Dom Miguel, Harcliffe, and other supporters are captured and face a firing squad, only to be rescued (some of them at least) at the last minute, by Lesba and a troop of rebels. When the rebellion succeeds, Harcliffe marries Lesba and becomes the director of commerce in the new regime. The couple raise their children in a cosmopolitan style, wintering in New Orleans and spending the rest of the year in Brazil.

== Reception ==
Baum's first adult novel was successful enough to justify a follow-up effort: a second Schuyler Staunton book, Daughters of Destiny, was issued in 1906. A third adult novel, The Last Egyptian, followed.

The Fate of a Crown was reprinted in a paperback edition in 2008.
