= Nelebel's Fairyland =

1905 short story written by L. Frank Baum

Nelebel's Fairyland is a twentieth-century fairy tale, a fantasy short story written by L. Frank Baum, famous as the creator of the Land of Oz. The story was first printed in the June 1905 issue of The Russ, the student newspaper of Russ High School in San Diego, California. It was reprinted in The Baum Bugle in 1962, and again in a 1980 collection of some of Baum's short fiction.

In the context of Baum's fantasy world, "Nelebel's Fairyland" is noteworthy as one of the small cluster of works that invoke Baum's specific non-Oz fairy domain, the Forest of Burzee, with its distinctive inhabitants of ryls, knooks and gigans as well as the more traditional fairies, pixies, and gnomes. In the story the queen of the Burzee fairies is Lulea, as in Queen Zixi of Ix, rather than Lurline, as in The Tin Woodman of Oz.

"Nelebel's Fairyland" tells of how the fairy princess Nelebel was exiled from the Forest of Burzee for some unknown offense. She and her retinue of ryls, knooks, and gigans travel across the sea to a strange shore. Nelebel's retinue magically terraform the place into a beautiful landscape — known today as San Diego Bay.

"The Nelebel story provides our earliest evidence that Baum's imaginary world" of Oz, Burzee, and their related and neighboring countries "is located somewhere in the Pacific Ocean." Baum would confirm this point of geography two years later: in his 1907 novel Ozma of Oz, Dorothy arrives in the Land of Ev, a borderland of Oz, after being washed overboard on a voyage from the United States to Australia.

Baum uses his ryls and knooks in several narratives, however "gigans" are mentioned solely in this story, nowhere else in his canon. The creatures are described as "only strong and faithful." They build up the terrain of San Diego Bay, including Point Loma, by playing in the sand while Nelebel sleeps. Baum also writes that "seventy-four years, five months and eight days after the events I am recording, Queen Lulea, becoming annoyed at the awkwardness of the huge gigans, transformed them into rampsies — the smallest of all immortals. So there are no gigans at all, in these days."
