= The Boy Fortune Hunters =

Juvenile adventure book series

Boy Fortune Hunters
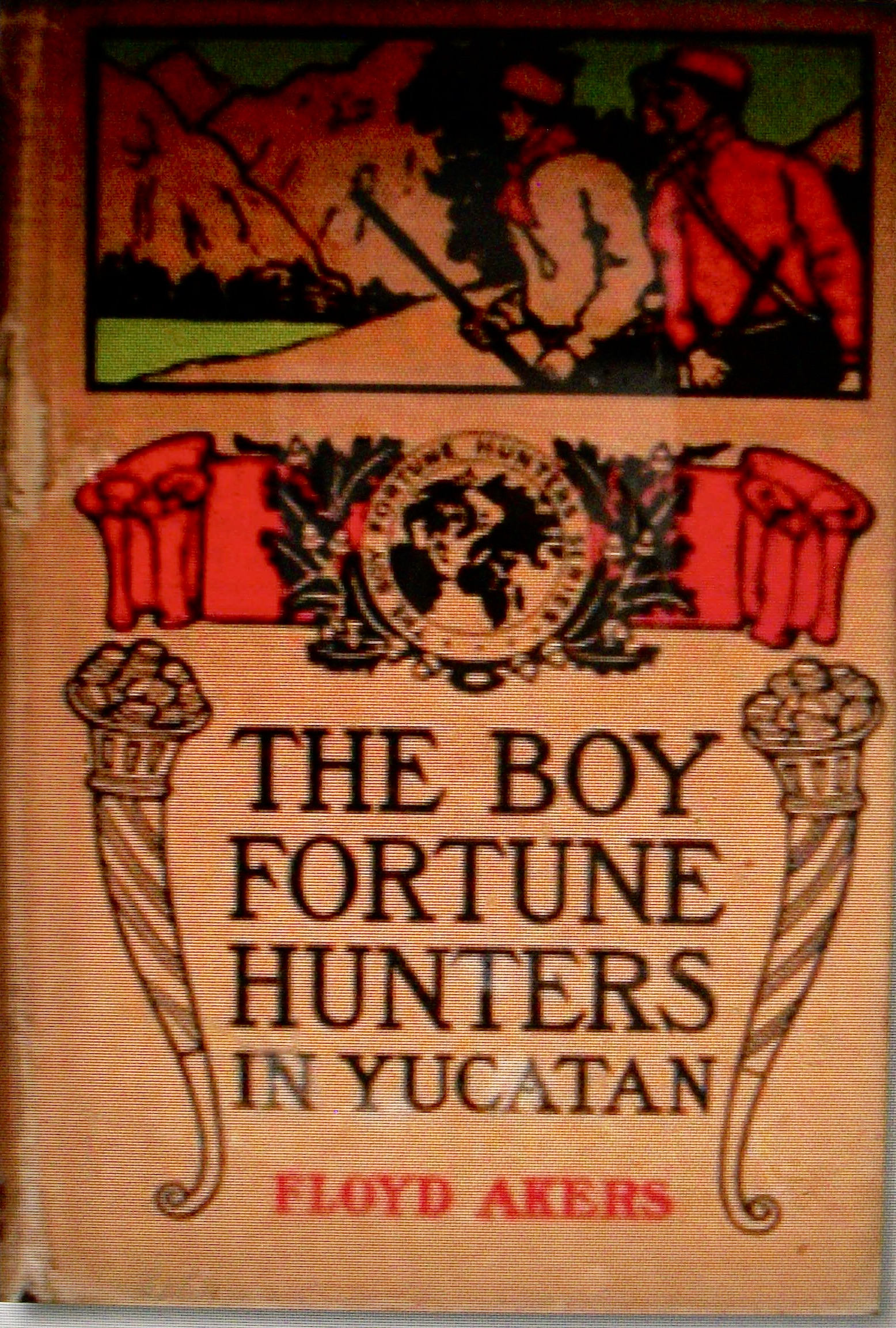
- The Boy Fortune Hunters in Yucatan cover
- Author: L. Frank Baum writing as Floyd Akers
- Language: English
- Genre: Juvenile adventure
- Publisher: Reilly & Britton
- Publication date: 1908-1911
- Publication place: United States

The Boy Fortune Hunters is a series of six adventure novels for adolescent boys. The series was written by L. Frank Baum, using the pseudonym of Floyd Akers, and published by Reilly & Britton. Howard Heath illustrated the books.

The first book in the series was published in 1908, and the sixth and last in 1911. Advertising shows that the series continued to be sold until at least 1918. The books were bound in brown cloth, with an illustration on the front cover.

A newspaper advertisement promoted the series by stating: "The author has a knack of taking his readers into the various parts of the world and giving them not only the adventures that can be found there, but also a local color which proves to be instructive and entertaining."

== Sam Steele adventures ==
In 1906 Baum, writing as Captain Hugh Fitzgerald, published the boys’ novel Sam Steele's Adventures on Land and Sea and he later wrote Sam Steele’s Adventures in Panama, but the books were not successful, so the publisher reissued them under new titles as the first two volumes of The Boy Fortune Hunters adventure series.

== Books serialized ==
Starting in 1912, at least three volumes of the series — The Boy Hunters in Panama, The Boy Fortune Hunters in Alaska, and The Boy Fortune Hunters in China — were serialized in the Boys and Girls section of several Sunday newspapers, with a few chapters being printed each week, along with a synopsis of the last installment.

== Main characters ==
Adventure-loving Sam Steele, 16 years old in the first book, is the son of Captain Steele of the Seagull, and nephew of Naboth Perkins, who is supercargo on the same merchant ship. Ned Britton is captain's mate – the second-in-command. Two South Sea Islanders take part in Sam's adventures. Nux is ship's cook, and Bryonia is the cabin steward. Years before the first book took place the two black men were found in a canoe, tied up and nearly dead, and they were brought aboard Uncle Naboth's ship and treated with two patent medicines, Nux Vomica and Bryonia. At the time the men knew no English and couldn't tell their names, so they were named after the medicines that saved them, and they've answered to the names ever since.

Joe Herring is a little younger than Sam, and though fortune hunting has made him rich, he chooses to be the ship's cabin boy. He is a "slight, stooping lad", but is strong and agile. Archie Ackley is the same age as Sam, comes from a wealthy family, but is "a reckless, adventurous sort of chap", and often sails on the Seagull as a passenger.

== Book titles and summaries ==
=== 1. The Boy Fortune Hunters in Alaska (1908) ===
(Formerly Sam Steele's Adventures On Land and Sea, by Capt. Hugh Fitzgerald)

In 1897 16-year-old Sam Steele, whose mother died when he was young, is told by sailor Ned Britton that his sea-captain father was killed in a shipwreck. The housekeeper, Mrs. Ranck, tells Sam the house is in her name, his father left nothing, and Sam must leave. He meets Uncle Naboth Perkins, who tells him Captain Steele had a share in Perkins' schooner, the Flipper, and Sam now inherits that share. Sam is made the purser and chief clerk. The Flipper sets sail for Alaska, where gold seekers are in need of provisions. But the schooner is damaged in a storm near the Alaskan coast, and when the crew anchor the vessel beside an unknown island, they are captured by stranded gold miners who force them to work at panning gold. After many adventures, Sam and Uncle Naboth become wealthy, and return to Sam's hometown, for the lad promised he'd someday pay Mrs. Ranck $400 she claims she is owed. They discover Captain Steele hadn't died, and his housekeeper had claimed Sam stole all his father's belongings and ran off. The stolen property is found where the housekeeper hid it, and Mrs. Ranck is told she won't be arrested if she gives back the house and leaves town. A partnership of Steele, Perkins and Steele is formed.

=== 2. The Boy Fortune Hunters in Panama (1908) ===
(Formerly Sam Steele's Adventures in Panama by Capt. Hugh Fitzgerald)

A damaged ship with a heavy cargo of steel structural beams needs to sail from an eastern harbor to California, but its crew has fled the ship. The owners want Captain Steele to take charge of the voyage, but he's supervising the construction of his new sailing ship, so suggests his young son Sam as captain of the damaged ship, with the help of first mate Ned Britton. Sam asks Nux and Bryonia to be on his crew, and Ned hires additional sailors. Right before sailing, an eccentric inventor, Duncan Moit, asks Sam to allow him to book passage and take his advanced automobile – which can travel on both land and water – to California, and Sam agrees. Sam's uncle, Naboth Perkins, also comes as a passenger. The ship is caught in a bad storm, and is wrecked on the shore of Panama. Sam and his crew discover that the local tribe hates whites, and will kill any that invade their territory. They also learn that a treasure in diamonds is buried within the tribe's land. After many adventures and dangers, Sam and a small party of explorers travel in Moit's wonderful automobile, find the diamonds, and are able to return to the shore, then travel home on another ship sent to salvage the cargo of steel beams.

=== 3. The Boy Fortune Hunters in Egypt (1908) ===
Captain Steele, Sam and Uncle Naboth are on their new ship, Seagull, preparing to sail for Egypt with U.S. factory-made "Oriental" rugs and fake antiques that will be sold to tourists. At night, Sam sees a leaking boat being rowed to the Seagull, carrying orphaned Joe Herring, a cabin-boy who had run away from a cruel captain who beat him. Sam decides to hide Joe until they're out at sea, for his father wouldn't help a runaway while in the harbor. Archie Ackley, 17 years old and relative of the cargo's owner, comes aboard as a passenger. Once in Egypt, they meet Professor Van Dorn, who tells of an ancient treasure he wanted to bring to the U.S. A group of men, including Van Dorn, Sam, Uncle Naboth, Archie and Joe agree to go after the treasure. They encounter dangers and treachery, and soon learn it is hard to know whom to trust. But they end up with much of the treasure, and Joe learns about his deceased father.

=== 4. The Boy Fortune Hunters in China (1909) ===
When Sam Steele is 18, the Seagull is commissioned to sail to China with merchandise. Joe Herring is on board as cabin boy, and Archie Ackley is a passenger. During a heavy fog, the Seagull is near the passenger ship Karamata Maru when it hits a derelict freighter and sinks. Most of the passengers are rescued by the Seagull's crew, including mortally wounded Prince Kai Lum Pu. The prince tells Sam he believes his servant, Mai Lo, plans to steal the treasure buried in the royal family's tombs, known as the Ancestral Halls. The prince asks Sam, Joe and Archie to take possession of the treasure, since the prince's Western education taught him his deceased ancestors will not need wealth in the afterlife. After the prince's death, the three youths, along with South Sea Islanders Nux and Bryonia, begin their journey to the treasure, with Mai Lo as an escort. But if the boy fortune hunters enter the Ancestral Halls it could mean their death, and it is not until Mai Lo is vanquished that they are able to leave with what Prince Lum Pu had wanted them to have.

=== 5. The Boy Fortune Hunters in Yucatán (1910) ===
Lieutenant Allerton of the U.S. Navy obtains a 3-month leave and he, along with a Mayan named Chaka, ask Captain Steele for passage on the Seagull to Yucatán. Allerton's mother and sisters are about to lose their mortgaged home, and Chaka knows of a hidden city where people from the lost continent of Atlantis live. They have gold and rubies that mean nothing to them, and Allerton wants to trade modern items to them for the precious items that can help his family keep their home. Sam and his friends Joe and Archie volunteer to go with him. They are joined by Ned Britton, Nux and Bryonia. Native tribes, including Chaka's people, are a danger, for they hate white people, but Allerton's uncle is an inventor who gives him wonderful items for protection and defense, such as an electrical device that knocks enemies unconscious. It is a perilous adventure, and the boy fortune hunters and their companions are nearly sacrificed to the god of the sun, but they escape with treasure, and Lieutenant Alberton saves the family home.

=== 6. The Boy Fortune Hunters in the South Seas (1911) ===
While in Australia, Señor de Jiminez wants to buy the Seagull and use it to transport arms and ammunition to start a revolution in Columbia. He can't ship it as freight, since the U.S. doesn't allow merchant ships to transport arms for such a purpose. It is agreed to temporarily sell the Seagull to Señor de Jiminez for a $15,000 down payment, and then the ship will be returned once the arms are delivered, with the down payment kept. The cargo is stored, and they set off with Señor de Jiminez and his family, as well as Madam de Alcantara and her daughter Lucia. Joe Herring, now second mate, is interested in Lucia. A storm comes up while sailing in the South Seas, and the Seagull is damaged near Faytan island, close to where Nux and Bryonia are from. Crew and passengers abandon ship and take life boats to Faytan. Bryonia declares the Pearl People live there, and they kill all outsiders who come to their island. The storm wedges the Seagull between rocks, so everyone re-boards the ship, as that is the safest location. Among the military supplies for Columbia is a bi-plane that Sam and Joe borrow to scout the land. The two are captured, but escape after many adventures. The Seagull is able to leave Faytan, and sail to Bryonia and Nux's island for repairs. Bryonia is now the rightful island ruler, but he and Nux choose to remain as part of the Seagull's crew. The cargo and passengers are taken to Columbia. Joe and Lucia exchange rings, and Joe promises Lucia he will see her again.
