= The Flying Girl =

1911 novel written by L. Frank Baum

- First edition
- Author: L. Frank Baum (as "Edith Van Dyne")
- Illustrator: Joseph Pierre Nuyttens
- Language: English
- Genre: Adventure, Melodrama
- Publisher: Reilly & Britton
- Publication date: 1911
- Publication place: United States
- Media type: Print (hardcover)

The Flying Girl is a novel written by L. Frank Baum, author of the Oz books. It was first published in 1911. In the book, Baum pursued an innovative blending of genres to create a modern flying adventure melodrama. The book was followed by a sequel, The Flying Girl and Her Chum, published the next year, 1912. Both books were illustrated by Joseph Pierre Nuyttens, the artist who also illustrated Baum's Annabel and Phoebe Daring in 1912.

As with Baum's other books for girls, these two novels were published under the pseudonym "Edith Van Dyne."

== Feminism ==
Baum lived during an era of increasing suffragette agitation; women gained the right to vote with the ratification of the 19th Amendment to the U.S. Constitution in 1920, the year after his death. Baum's mother-in-law Matilda Joslyn Gage was a leading feminist of her generation, and influenced Baum's views.

Baum was not uncritical of these trends, and pokes some fun at the feminist and suffragette movement in his books – the most obvious example being General Jinjur and her Army of Revolt in The Marvelous Land of Oz. Yet Baum also had a strong sympathy with some of the goals of the movement, a sympathy that is reflected in his literary canon. Oz, of course, is a female-dominated society, with Princess Ozma, Glinda, and witches good and bad. Baum wrote a number of books specifically for girls; his ten-novel series Aunt Jane's Nieces portrays young women acting with independence, initiative, and individuality in preference to traditional gender roles. In one case, Baum went too far for his publishers: though he was their star writer, Reilly & Britton rejected the first version of his 1916 book Mary Louise, "presumably because the heroine was not sufficiently idealized." Though unhappy with their decision, Baum re-wrote the book to deliver a more tame heroine.

== Technology ==
Dr. Edwin P. Ryland, a Methodist minister and a personal friend of Baum, maintained that if Baum had not pursued his vocation of writing for children "he might have been one of the country's best known technical writers for he had a strong leaning toward technical matters." Many critics who have written about Baum and Oz have noted that Baum's is a technology-friendly fantasy realm, which sets it apart from the more traditional fantasies that preceded it. Baum's Oz books and other works reveal commonalities with science fiction (The Master Key) and utopian fiction; they contain mechanical men (the Tin Woodman and Tik-Tok), a planned metropolis (the Emerald City), a domed submersible city and miniature submarines (in Glinda of Oz), and similar features.

Baum's Flying Girl books provide a dramatic and blatant display of this technological bent. The first book opens with a Foreword in which Baum thanks Wilbur Wright and Glenn Curtiss "for curtesies extended during the preparation of this manuscript." Curtiss and the Wright Brothers appear briefly in the book, along with other early "aeronauts" like Walter Brookins and Arch Hoxsey. Baum's treatment of heavier-than-air powered flight through both books is strongly affirmative.

== Quimby ==
Baum's aviatrix character Orissa Kane had a real-life counterpart. Harriet Quimby arose to notoriety in the same year as the first Flying Girl book appeared. Yet Baum's book appears to have been written before he could have been influenced by Quimby's brief career (she died in a crash in 1912). The coincidence of the actual Quimby and the fictional Orissa Kane seems to have been nothing more than that – coincidence.

== The Flying Girl ==
The first novel tells the story of Orissa Kane, the sister of a young man who is building his own flying machine. The 17-year-old Orissa provides financial support for her brother Stephen Kane and their blind mother through her office job, while Steve concentrates on his invention. She also supports Steve's work emotionally, urging him forward. The story involves commercial and technical competition, and sabotage by a competitor. When Steve suffers a broken leg in a crash and cannot fly, Orissa takes his place to prove the validity of his aircraft, demonstrating her own courage and competence in the process. She wins the top prize in an aerial exhibition and gets a boyfriend too, without ever losing "her humble and unassuming manner" and her other maidenly virtues. (Baum was simultaneously writing a similar story, of a brave girl defending her brother's interests, in his 1911 novel The Daring Twins.)

Her brother Steve supports her decision to fly, in the bold spirit characteristic of the new field of aviation. In Chapter 19 he says, "The most successful aviators in the future...are bound to be women. As a rule they are lighter than men, more supple and active, quick of perception and less liable to lose their heads in emergencies. The operation of an aeroplane is, it seems to me, especially fitted to women." (No traditionalist or male chauvinist would have written that women are "less liable to lose their heads" in an emergency than men.)

== ...and Her Chum ==
In the sequel, instrument trouble in Steve's new hydroplane forces Orissa and her friend and passenger Sybil to set down on a remote island. (Baum would structure a similar story, of two girls adventuring, in his final Oz book, Glinda of Oz, later in the decade.) The second novel is less an aviation tale and more of a straight adventure story than its predecessor. Baum's publisher Sumner C. Britton had the author tone down the book, telling him by letter, "You have made the story too thrilling..." for a (supposedly) female author and her fans.

== Later editions ==
The Flying Girl books were not as popular in their day as the other "Edith Van Dyne" novels; they went out of print with their first editions and were not reprinted for eight decades. Baum's publishers apparently knew their market well, and made a valid judgement, on the purely commercial level, in discouraging Baum from creating heroines more independent than his audience would accept.

The Flying Girl resurfaced in Oz-story Magazine in 1997, with new illustrations by Eric Shanower. Its sequel, The Flying Girl and Her Chum, was issued by Hungry Tiger Press in a separate edition the same year, with Nuyttens's original pictures.
