= Daughters of Destiny (novel) =

1906 novel by L. Frank Baum

- First edition
- Author: L. Frank Baum (as "Schuyler Staunton")
- Illustrator: Thomas Mitchell Pierce; Harold DeLay
- Language: English
- Genre: Adventure fiction
- Publisher: Reilly & Britton
- Publication date: 1906
- Publication place: United States
- Media type: Print (hardcover)
- Pages: 319 pp.

Daughters of Destiny is a 1906 adventure novel written by L. Frank Baum, famous as the author of the Oz books. Baum published the novel under the pen name "Schuyler Staunton," one of his several pseudonyms. (Baum arrived at the name by adding one letter to the name of his late maternal uncle, Schuyler Stanton.)

The 1906 edition of the book featured eight illustrations, three by Thomas Mitchell Pierce and five by Harold DeLay. Pierce was a son-in-law of Baum's sister Harriet Alvena Baum Neal; he contributed illustrations to Baum's 1898 poetry collection By the Candelabra's Glare.

Baum had originally intended to call his novel The Girl in the Harem.

== Adult fiction ==
Overall, Baum dedicated his literary career to writing for children. For a brief period in the middle of the twentieth century's first decade, though, he made a concentrated effort to write for an adult audience as well. This effort produced two other novels in addition to Daughters of Destiny — The Fate of a Crown (1905), the first Schuyler Staunton novel, and The Last Egyptian (1908), published anonymously.

Writing to entertain, Baum chose exotic locales and melodramatic elements for these books. The Fate of a Crown is set in Brazil, and deals with the revolution of 1889; Daughters of Destiny is set even farther afield, in Baluchistan. In Baum's fiction, Baluchistan is still an independent state, though the region had fallen under the sway of the British Empire in the later nineteenth century.

== Islam ==
Given his setting and subject, Baum's book had to involve the religion of Islam and an Islamic culture. While his text does deliver some stereotypical "dog of an infidel" dialogue, Baum for the most part takes a serious and respectful approach to Islam – something that was far from universal among Americans and Westerners of his generation. Baum recognizes the existence of Sunni Islam (he uses the term "Sunnite"), with its Imams ("Imaum"). Significantly, he introduces a "Grand Mufti" named Salaman in Chapter 15 of his book, and portrays him as a man of real and profound spirituality and wisdom.

Baum's hero is a half-Persian, half-American Muslim who marries the Christian American heroine, with no mention of religious conversion.

== Synopsis ==
The American Construction Syndicate wants to build a railroad across Baluchistan, as part of their plans for global development. The company appoints a commission, headed by Colonel Piedmont Moore, to obtain the right of way from the Baluchi ruler. Moore chooses his personal friend and physician Dr. Warner as his second in command; and with commendable nepotism he selects his son Allison Moore as the commission's surveyor. Dr. Warner's ebullient daughter Bessie wants to come along, and solicits Moore's daughter Janet to come too; the young women will by chaperoned by Bessie's Aunt Lucy. (Col. Moore is secretly pleased that his daughter Janet will make the trip; she has been melancholy after an unhappy love affair, with a man the Colonel regards as a thief and scoundrel.)

The Americans travel to Baluchistan, and promptly get themselves embroiled in a succession conflict. The reigning Khan of the country is dying, and two cousins vie for the crown. One, Kasam, is masquerading as their guide. What follows is a complex but tightly-woven plot that involves subterfuge and conspiracy, poisonings and attempted assassinations, sword fights and a pursuit in the desert, a scheming femme fatale, disguises and false identities – all the ingredients of melodrama.

In the end, Prince Kasam's rival Ahmed (or Hafiz) inherits the throne of Baluchistan – but he yields it to Kasam so he can return to the United States with the heroine, Janet Moore. It is revealed that Ahmed/Hafiz is actually Howard Osborne, the man Janet had previously loved (and secretly married, seven years before). Osborne had nobly but foolishly taken the blame for an embezzlement actually committed by Allison Moore, the Colonel's son and Janet's brother. Once all the secrets are out, the difficulties are resolved; and the requisite happy ending is achieved. And Bessie stays behind to marry Prince Kasam, and become the Khanum of Baluchistan.

Notably, Ahmed/Hafiz/Osborne abdicates his throne in part for personal reasons, but also because he thinks it would be bad for the country to be ruled by someone deeply influenced by American culture. It is better, he thinks, for the people of Baluchistan to maintain their traditional way of life than to be thrust into the frenetic modern world – an interesting rejection, on the author's part, of imperialism and the idolatry of progress.

== Biases ==
Daughters of Destiny was reprinted in the 1998 issue of the annual Oz-story Magazine, with new illustrations by Eric Shanower. That publication was accompanied by a notice that the story "contains a number of offensive stereotypes. Fortunately, they have very little bearing on the story." The comic character David the Jew, the Americans' interpreter, would be offensive to the sensibilities of many modern readers.

In his thoughtful and deliberative frame of mind, Baum was in favor of tolerance and against bigotry of all types; this is reflected in Daughters of Destiny and in other of his books. (For pertinent examples, see Sky Island and Sam Steele's Adventures on Land and Sea.) Yet he was not, and could not have been, a man with a mindset of modern political correctness. When writing with the intent of humoring, as with David the Jew in this book, Baum willingly exploited the ethnic and racial stereotypes that were current in his era. (See also Father Goose: His Book, The Woggle-Bug Book, and Father Goose's Year Book.)
