= The Runaway Shadows =

1901 fantasy short story written by L. Frank Baum

"The Runaway Shadows, or A Trick of Jack Frost" is a twentieth-century fairy tale, a fantasy short story written by L. Frank Baum, famous as the creator of the Land of Oz. The story is one of a small cluster of Baum narratives that involve his fantasy land the Forest of Burzee and its exotic denizens. Arguably, Burzee constitutes Baum's second most important fantasy realm after Oz itself, being employed in his novels The Life and Adventures of Santa Claus (1902) and Queen Zixi of Ix (1905) and several of his short stories, and is referenced in The Road to Oz (1909).

"The Runaway Shadows" was first published on 5 June 1901, in some of the newspapers that had published Baum's American Fairy Tales in the spring of the same year. The story was projected as part of that collection, but was omitted when the book was published in October 1901.

The story was reprinted in the April 1962 issue of The Baum Bugle. It also appeared in a 1980 edition of Baum's short fiction released by the International Wizard of Oz Club.

== Plot summary ==
On the coldest day of the year, the Frost King allows his son Jack Frost to play pranks on humans. Jack Frost comes upon the Prince of Thumbumbia and his cousin Lady Lindeva, who have insisted on being allowed to play outside despite the bitter cold. The children have been so well-bundled-up by the royal servants that Jack is unable to pinch their ears or noses; frustrated, he hits upon the idea of freezing the children's shadows. Solidified into independent entities, the shadows run off to the Forest of Burzee to enjoy their newfound freedom. They prove impervious to an attack by the ferocious tiger Kahtah; but a passing Ryl (a member of a fictional species invented by Baum that appears in several of his works) convinces the shadows to return to their humans. Otherwise, the frozen shadows will vanish to nothingness when they thaw in the warm weather to come.

The King of Thumbumbia dies, and courtiers come to his nephew the Prince to elevate the boy to the throne — but they are amazed to see that the boy casts no shadow. Lady Lindeva, next in line for the crown, suffers the same strange infirmity. The Earl Highlough, the "chief man in all the kingdom," comes to investigate — though by this time the runaway shadows have returned to their young master and mistress. The Prince becomes King, with Lady Lindeva as his Queen.
