= Emma Speed Sampson =

American novelist

- Born: Emma Speed; December 1, 1868; Louisville, Kentucky, U.S.
- Died: May 7, 1947 (aged 78); Richmond, Virginia, U.S.
- Resting place: Hollywood Cemetery
- Occupation: Writer (novelist)
- Writing career
- Pen name: Nell Speed, Edith Van Dyne
- Period: 20th century
- Genre: Juvenile fiction

Emma Speed Sampson (December 1, 1868 – May 7, 1947) was an American author of juvenile fiction and a movie censor.

== Biography ==
Sampson was born on a farm near Louisville, Kentucky. Her parents were George Keats Speed and Jane U. Ewing.

She studied art at the Art Students League in New York City. She returned to Louisville where she started teaching. She married Henry Aylett Sampson in 1896. Together they raised two daughters. She and her husband and her sister, Nell Speed, moved to Richmond, Virginia which remained her permanent home. Nell, who was a writer of a series of juvenile books featuring a young woman called Molly Brown, was ill with cancer so she convinced her sister to continue the series after her death.

Sampson continued the series for another three books (Nell wrote the first four) and published them using her sister's name. She wrote several more books using the pseudonym Nell Speed when she switched publishers and began writing under her own name. She wrote a sequel to 'Miss Minerva and William Green Hill' written by Frances Boyd Calhoun, titled Billy and the Major. She continued to write the entire Miss Minerva series. She also continued The Bluebird Books series started by L. Frank Baum.

Sampson served on the Virginia board of motion picture censors and was a movie reviewer for the Richmond Times-Dispatch. She died in 1947 at the age of 78. She was buried in Hollywood Cemetery.

== Works ==
=== Nell Speed ===
- Molly Brown’s Freshman Days, (1912)
- Molly Brown's Sophomore Days, (1912)
- Molly Brown’s Junior Days, (1912)
- Molly Brown’s Senior Days, (1913)
- Molly Brown's Post-Graduate Days, (1914)
- Molly Brown's Orchard Home, (1915)
- At Boarding School With The Tucker Twins, (1915)
- Vacation With The Tucker Twins, (1916)
- The Carter Girls, (1917)
- Back At School With The Tucker Twins, (1917)
- Molly Brown Of Kentucky, (1918)
- The Carter Girls' Weekend Camp, (1918)
- Tripping With The Tucker Twins, (1919)
- Molly Brown's College Friends, (1921)
- The Carter Girls' Mysterious Neighbor, (1921)
- A House Party With The Tucker Twins, (1921)
- The Carter Girls Of Carter House, (1924)
- In New York With The Tucker Twins, (1924)

=== Edith Van Dyne ===
- Mary Louise at Dorfield, (1920)
- Mary Louise Stands the Test, (1921)
- Mary Louise and Josie O'Gorman, (1922)
- Josie O'Gorman, (1923)
- Josie O'Gorman and the Meddlesome Major, (1924)

=== Emma Speed Sampson ===
- Billy And The Major, (1918)
- Mammy's White Folks, (1919)
- Miss Minerva's Baby, (1920)
- Mary Louise at Dorfield, (1920)
- Mary Louise Stands the Test, (1921)
- The Shorn Lamb, (1922)
- The Comings Of Cousin Ann, (1923)
- Miss Minerva On The Old Plantation, (1923)
- Miss Minerva Broadcasts Billy, (1925)
- Miss Minerva's Scallywags, (1927)
- Miss Minerva's Neighbors, (1929)
- Miss Minerva Goin' Places, (1931)
- Miss Minerva's Cook Book, (1931)
- Miss Minerva's Mystery, (1933)
- Miss Minerva's Problem, (1936)
- Miss Minerva's Vacation, (1939)
