= Sam Steele's Adventures on Land and Sea =

1906 book by L. Frank Baum

- First edition
- Author: L. Frank Baum (as "Capt. Hugh Fitzgerald")
- Illustrator: Howard Heath
- Language: English
- Genre: Adventure fiction young adult fiction
- Publisher: Reilly & Britton
- Publication date: 1906
- Publication place: United States
- Media type: Print (hardcover)
- Pages: 271 pp.
- Followed by: Sam Steele's Adventures in Panama

Sam Steele's Adventures on Land and Sea is a juvenile adventure novel written by L. Frank Baum, famous as the creator of the Land of Oz. The book was Baum's first effort at writing specifically for an audience of adolescent boys, a market he pursued in the coming years of his career. The novel was first published in 1906, under the pen name "Capt. Hugh Fitzgerald", one of Baum's pseudonyms.

== Audiences and markets ==
Around the turn of the twentieth century (1897–1905), Baum had succeeded in establishing himself as a popular author of children's books, most notably with The Wonderful Wizard of Oz (1900). By the middle of the twentieth century's first decade, he was working diligently to branch out into other markets. In 1905, he released his first adult novel, The Fate of a Crown (as the work of "Schuyler Staunton"). In 1906, he issued his first books for adolescent girls, Annabel (as by "Suzanne Metcalf") and Aunt Jane's Nieces (by "Edith Van Dyne"), as well as his first book for boys. The 1906 Sam Steele title was the first book in a projected series; "Capt. Fitzgerald" followed up with Sam Steele's Adventures in Panama in 1907.

== The story ==
Unusually for Baum, the tale of Sam Steele's Adventures on Land and Sea is told in the first person, by the title character. Sam Steele "is a stereotyped ideal: a capable, brave, enterprising, likable, manly sixteen-year-old American". In 1897, Sam is informed that his father, a sea captain named Richard Steele, has been killed in a shipwreck, and Sam is quickly cheated of his inheritance. Now an orphan, he meets his maternal uncle, Naboth Perkins, another sea captain and ship-owner. Together, the two set sail in the Pacific trade.

From San Francisco, Sam and his uncle embark on Naboth's ship the Flipper, carrying provisions north to open a general store in the boom towns of the Klondike Gold Rush (referred to half-accurately as "Alaska"). A storm casts them onto a remote island, occupied by stranded and desperate miners who have struck a rich goldfield. The crew of the Flipper reach an alliance with the miners, and have to cope with thieves and natural hazards before they can return with ample rewards for their trouble.

At home again, Sam and Naboth discover that Sam's father has survived his shipwreck, with only the loss of a leg. They win a legal battle to regain the lost patrimony.

Incidentally, the Flipper crew never reached Alaska. Oddly enough, despite the repeated references to the Klondike Gold Rush, there is no reference to its chief Canadian lawman Sam Steele.

Baum's plot was influenced by Robert Louis Stevenson's Treasure Island. A subplot contains an allusion to H. Rider Haggard's She. In turn, Baum borrowed elements from his first Sam Steele book when he came to write The Sea Fairies five years later. He turned his character Naboth Perkins into Cap'n Bill Weedles in the later book.

== Later editions ==
The two Sam Steele books of 1906 and 1907 did not sell as well as their author and publisher had hoped. Reilly & Britton did not give up on the project, however. They re-issued both books with new titles in 1908, under yet another pen name, "Floyd Akers". (A possible derivation: "F. Akers" from "fakers".) The first book, Sam Steele's Adventures on Land and Sea, was re-titled The Boy Fortune Hunters in Alaska (though there is only one boy fortune hunter in it, and Alaska is not a setting). Its sequel was re-titled The Boy Fortune Hunters in Panama. Baum wrote a third volume in the series, The Boy Fortune Hunters in Egypt, also published in 1908. He added three more titles to the Boy Fortune Hunters series in the next three years, with more boys and, of course, more fortune hunting.

Sam Steele's Adventures on Land and Sea was reprinted in the first issue of the annual Oz-story Magazine in 1995. There, Howard Heath's original illustrations were replaced with pictures culled from the large output of the veteran Baum illustrator John R. Neill. That the Neill illustrations were not meant to serve this story is obvious from certain details, most notably the internal inconsistency of the likenesses for Naboth Perkins and other characters.
