= Annabel (Baum novel) =

1906 juvenile novel written by L. Frank Baum

- First edition
- Author: L. Frank Baum (as "Suzanne Metcalf")
- Illustrator: H. Putnam Hall
- Language: English
- Genre: Young adult fiction
- Publisher: Reilly & Britton
- Publication date: 1906
- Publication place: United States
- Media type: Print (hardcover)
- Pages: 213 pp.

Annabel: A Novel for Young Folk is a 1906 juvenile novel written by L. Frank Baum, the author famous for his series of books on the Land of Oz. The book was issued under the pen name "Suzanne Metcalf," one of Baum's various pseudonyms. Annabel was one of Baum's first efforts to write a novel for adolescent girls – who soon became one of his most important audiences.

== Literary markets ==
In the years around 1900, Baum had established himself as a successful author of children's literature, most notably with The Wonderful Wizard of Oz. In the middle of the twentieth century's first decade, he worked to expand his reach into three other potentially lucrative markets. He published his first adult novel, The Fate of a Crown, in 1905. In 1906 came Annabel, plus Sam Steele's Adventures on Land and Sea, Baum's first book for adolescent boys. (Each of these books was released under a different pseudonym. The prolific Baum had learned from earlier experience that he ended up "competing with himself" if he issued too much material in his own name in a short period of time. As Reilly & Britton's star author, it was also important that he make it appear that the company published more authors than they did.)

Annabel, however, was apparently not the breakthrough that the author and his publisher might have hoped for. The novel is a "Horatio Alger-type story in which a virtuous vegetable-peddler discovers that his supposedly dead father is alive and rich...." Baum drives the story with multiple coincidences, and ties them together at the end with a nod to God's providence. "Apparently the book did not catch on, for its author, 'Suzanne Metcalf,' produced no more."

Still, the book was popular enough to be reprinted in a second edition. The original edition of Annabel featured illustrations by H. Putnam Hall. In the second edition of 1912, these were replaced with a new set of pictures by Joseph Pierre Nuyttens, who illustrated other Baum works, The Flying Girl, Phoebe Daring, and The Flying Girl and Her Chum, in 1911 and 1912.

Also in 1906, Baum's Aunt Jane's Nieces (by "Edith Van Dyne") proved to be a popular hit, and launched a series of ten novels for girls that was one of Baum's major successes. He followed that with his The Bluebird Books, another successful series of the same type.

== Synopsis ==
Will Carden, the novel's protagonist, is fifteen years old at the start of the story. His family has "come down" in the world: though his late father had once owned a steel mill, Will and his mother and siblings now survive by growing vegetables on a two-acre plot of land. Will is popular with the local children, especially with the five Williams siblings who live in the big house in the town of Bingham. Of the five, Mary Louise is the beauty; her twelve-year-old sister Annabel is plain in comparison, with red hair and freckles and a "pug nose." Their father owns the steel mill that succeeded the Carden mill as the town's leading employer; their mother, the snobbish Mrs. Williams, wounds Will by telling her children to avoid the lowly "vegetable boy."

Will, however, is a lad of fine character; he is encouraged by the local physician, Dr. Meigs, who joins the Carden family in a mushroom-growing business that relieves their poverty. Will saves Annabel's life when she falls through a frozen pond while ice-skating. Annabel and Will grow close as Annabel blossoms into young womanhood; Meigs encourages her steel-magnate father to acknowledge and encourage the boy.

Meigs and Williams also become suspicious of Ezra Jordan, the man who manages Williams's mill and boards with the Cardens. Jordan was crucial in the Carden family's history; the doctor and steel-man realize that all knowledge of the death of Will's father has filtered through Jordan. Upon investigation, they learn that Jordan has cheated both Williams and the Cardens, by appropriating a valuable steel-making process developed by the elder Carden. It turns out that Mr. Carden is alive and well in Britain, where he has made his fortune. Jordan has worked a double fraud: he deceived the Cardens in Bingham into believing that their husband and father had died in a shipwreck – and he also tricked Carden in England into thinking that his family had perished in a later ship wreck. Jordan maintained his lodging with the family precisely to intercept any possible communications that would reveal his nefarious scheme.

Once all of the facts are revealed, the Carden family is united in prosperity once more. Will and Annabel look forward to marriage and the prospect of a happy union.

Annabel was included in the sixth and final issue of the annual Oz-story Magazine in 2000, with the illustrations of both Hall and Nuyttens.
