= The Daring Twins =

1911 children's novel by L. Frank Baum

- First edition
- Author: L. Frank Baum
- Illustrator: Pauline M. Batchelder
- Language: English
- Series: The Daring Twins
- Genre: Mystery
- Publisher: Reilly & Britton
- Publication date: 1911
- Publication place: United States
- Media type: Print (hardcover)
- Pages: 317 pp.

The Daring Twins: A Story for Young Folk is a mystery novel for juvenile readers, written by L. Frank Baum, author of the Oz books. It was first published in 1911, and was intended as the opening installment in a series of similar books.

Baum's plan for a series of juvenile novels featuring the Daring family was never fully realized; a sequel to the first book, titled Phoebe Daring, was published in 1912. Unlike many of his mysteries, adventure stories, and juvenile novels, Baum published his two Daring Twins novels under his own name, rather than employing one of his multiple pseudonyms.

The Daring Twins was republished in 2006 under the alternative title The Secret of the Lost Fortune. The 2006 edition carries a notice on its copyright page that "The novel contains a number of racial and ethnic stereotypes that may be considered offensive today."

== Plot ==
The story centers on a family of five orphaned children, two of whom are twins. Phil Daring works in a bank; when he is unjustly suspected of thievery, his twin sister Phoebe, a spirited 16-year-old, seizes the initiative in proving his innocence. (Baum was simultaneously writing a similar story, of a brave girl defending and supporting her brother, in his 1911 novel The Flying Girl. And he would re-use the plot of a girl with an unjustly-accused relative in his 1916 book, Mary Louise, the first book of yet another series.)

The Daring Twins' late father had been in the sugar business; he was ruined financially when he refused to join in a monopoly, believing that trusts and monopolies are "unjust and morally unlawful" — an interesting look into Baum's values.

== Trivia ==
The novel and its sequel revolve around brave, spirited teenagers in a small town called Riverdale, 30 years before the founding of Archie Comics, a popular franchise with the same basic premise.
