= The Master Key (Baum novel) =

1901 novel by L. Frank Baum

- First edition cover
- Author: L. Frank Baum
- Illustrator: F. Y. Cory
- Publisher: Bowen-Merrill Company
- Publication date: 1901

The Master Key: An Electrical Fairy Tale, Founded Upon the Mysteries of Electricity and the Optimism of Its Devotees is a 1901 novel by L. Frank Baum, author of The Wonderful Wizard of Oz. It was illustrated by F. Y. Cory.

== Plot summary ==
The protagonist is a boy named Rob Joslyn. His age is not specified. Baum dedicated the book "To My Son, Robert Stanton Baum," who was born in 1886 and would thus have been about fifteen at the time it was published.

Rob is an electrical experimenter whose father encourages him and sees that he "never lacked batteries, motors or supplies of any sort." A "net-work [sic] of wires soon ran throughout the house". He loses track of the elaborately interconnected wires, and trying to get a cardboard house to light up, he "experimented in a rather haphazard fashion, connecting this and that wire blindly and by guesswork, in the hope that he would strike the right combination." There is a bright flash, and a being who calls himself the Daemon of Electricity appears. He tells Rob that he has accidentally "touched the Master Key of Electricity" and is entitled "to demand from me three gifts each week for three successive weeks." Rob protests that he does not know what to ask for, and the Daemon agrees to select the gifts himself.

Over the next two weeks, Rob experiences adventures exploring the use of the Daemon's gifts, but eventually concludes that neither he nor the world is ready for them. On the third week, Rob rejects the Daemon's gifts and tells him to bide his time until humankind knows how to use them. The Daemon leaves. With a light heart, Rob concludes that he made the right decision.

During the first week, the Daemon gives Rob three gifts:

- a silver box of food tablets, each one of which provides sufficient nourishment for a whole day
- a "small tube" which can direct "an electric current" at a foe, rendering him unconscious for the period of one hour
- a wristwatch-sized transportation device, which allows the wearer to fly at any height and travel at high speeds in any direction, when it is working properly. It is, however, somewhat fragile and becomes damaged and unreliable during Rob's adventures, creating predicaments for him.

During the second week, the Daemon gives Rob three additional gifts:

- a "garment of protection," which renders him invulnerable to bullets, swords, or other physical attack
- a "record of events," which provides remote views of important events taking place in any part of the world at any time within the last twenty-four hours
- A "character marker," a set of spectacles: "while you wear them every one you meet will be marked upon the forehead with a letter indicating his or her character. The good will bear the letter 'G,' the evil the letter 'E.' The wise will be marked with a 'W' and the foolish with an 'F.' The kind will show a 'K' upon their foreheads and the cruel a letter 'C.'"

During the third week, the Daemon offered:

- An "Electro-Magnetic Restorer" which "For its wearer will instantly become free from any bodily disease or pain and will enjoy perfect health and vigor. In truth, so great are its powers that even the dead may be restored to life, provided the blood has not yet chilled."
- An "Illimitable Communicator. It is a simple electric device which will enable you, wherever you may be, to converse with people in any part of the world".

Like some of Baum's adult novels, The Master Key features encounters with real historical figures of the period, such as King Edward VII of Britain, President Émile Loubet, Emperor Wilhelm II of Germany, and the Duke of Orléans.

== Reception ==
In 1901, The New York Times ran a brief notice calling it "a story for boys—all boys who love good wholesome adventure and exciting incident. It is a strange story of the electrical Daemon, treating of powers that dominate all nature, and written for the eager, alert, and striving American boy."

== Reprint editions ==
In 1974, the novel was reprinted by Hyperion Press.

In 1997, Books of Wonder published an edition illustrated by Nick Bruel. Some lines from the chapter where Rob meets a tribe of African pygmy cannibals were excised due to racist content.
