= Phoebe Daring =

1912 children's novel by L. Frank Baum

- First edition
- Author: L. Frank Baum
- Illustrator: Joseph Pierre Nuyttens
- Language: English
- Series: The Daring Twins
- Genre: Mystery
- Publisher: Reilly & Britton
- Publication date: 1912
- Publication place: United States
- Media type: Print (hardcover)

Phoebe Daring: A Story for Young Folk is a mystery novel for juvenile readers, written by L. Frank Baum, the author of the Oz books. Published in 1912, it was a sequel to the previous year's The Daring Twins, and the second and final installment in a proposed series of similar books. Phoebe Daring was illustrated by Joseph Pierre Nuyttens, the artist who illustrated Baum's The Flying Girl, Annabel, and The Flying Girl and Her Chum in the same period. Hungry Tiger Press announced that they would reprint the book as Unjustly Accused! in the back of their 2006 reprint of the first book as The Secret of the Lost Fortune.

Like The Daring Twins, Phoebe Daring involves two orphaned twins, Philip and Phoebe Daring; as its title indicates, the sister takes the primary role in the second book, which delivers a plot about a good man unjustly suspected of a crime – very much as the first one did. This similarity, and lack of originality, might be the best explanation for the book's limited popular success and the termination of the Daring Twins series after two books.

It is clear that Baum had hopes of more Daring Twins novels, involving the younger of the five Daring siblings and eventually their children as well. Evidence suggests that he wrote at least a third book in the series; in the papers left after Baum's death in 1919, the file that contained the manuscript for his last Oz book, Glinda of Oz, was labelled Phoebe Daring, Conspirator. Baum's correspondence with his publisher, Reilly & Britton, mentions yet another book, titled either Phil Daring's Experiment or The Daring Twins' Experiment. Yet nothing of these other Daring books is known to have survived.

The girl-detective concept had a persistent hold on Baum's imagination. He returned to it in a more successful series, the Mary Louise novels that he began in 1916.

== Plot ==
Phil Daring, who considered himself the oldest Daring, despite being five minutes younger than Phoebe, is away at college. Phoebe occupies her time learning telegraphy from Dave Hunter, brother of her best friend, Lucy, but once she has mastered it, it loses its novelty, and the town of Riverdale has only three telephones.

Judge Ferguson's heart failed in his sleep, and no one is being allowed into his office to claim personal items they had in trust with him. Mrs. Ritchie, who hates banks, has her money and important papers in Ferguson's office, but is told by Constable Sam Parsons that she has to wait and follow procedure before she can claim her property that was in Ferguson's possession.

A young lawyer, John Holbrook, has arrived in Riverdale and decides to rent out Ferguson's office. The Darings try to get him to take on Toby Clark as his clerk, as Toby had done for Judge Ferguson, and, having crippled his foot in the events of The Daring Twins, there are not many jobs he can still do. Holbrook spent all the money he had setting up his business, and is not able to hire him at the present time, but when Toby is accused of stealing the box, Holbrook takes the case. A blue tin box with Mrs. Ritchie's name on it is found in the back yard of the Clark shanty by the river, and her papers are found in the back room. This seems to damn Toby, but Phoebe and many of Toby's other friends do not believe he could have committed the act, while his low upbringing creates suspicion in others, such as Tom Rathbun and Dave Hunter.

Phoebe interrogates several people and comes up with a list of people who potentially could have stolen Mrs. Ritchie's box—Will Chandler, the postmaster and descendant of Riverdale's earliest family; Mrs. Ritchie herself as a scam; Sam Parsons, who guarded Ferguson's office; John Holbrook, who appeared at the office to rent it before its contents were cleared; Mrs. Miller, a deaf-mute maid; and Joe Griggs, the hardware store owner, who happened to be in place at the right time to make him a suspect. Will and Sam strongly tried to dissuade her from thinking anyone besides Toby may be the thief, but Phoebe is undaunted.

Don and Becky Daring, two of the younger Darings, meet in the barn on the Randolph property, being friends with the Randolph children, Allerton (of the infamous "naked niggers in Africa" quotation of the previous book—the only use of the epithet in either book, despite the Southern setting) and Doris. They decide to form a marching society for the innocence of Toby Clark, and after receiving an anonymous donation, decide to hire Ed Collins's town band to assist them.

Phoebe finds that her friend, Nathalie Cameron, as well as John Holbrook, saw a woman leave with the box during the night. Phoebe then visits Sam Parsons, who has the box in his possession, which proves that the pried-open box found on the Clark property is not Mrs. Ritchie's, even though it was the right color and her name was painted on it. Parsons, while well-meaning and certainly seeing himself innocent of police corruption, admits that Toby did not steal the box. He knows who did, but argues that the actual thief will suffer more than Toby Clark will from serving time in prison, thus finding it morally appropriate to plant false evidence on Toby Clark. She insists that she knows Toby but does not know the thief. Sam asserts that Phoebe does know the thief and her relations, just that she doesn't know who they are. This doesn't sit well with Phoebe, nor with Judith Eliot, the Darings' young but of age cousin and guardian, who refuses to take an active part in Phoebe's detective work.

Judith's cousin John, who is not cousin to the Darings, is the governor, and dresses down for a familial visit. He becomes very interested in the case, and agrees that Phoebe and Judith's sense of justice is more correct than Sam's.

Mrs. Ritchie is upset that one of her papers, in a yellow envelope, is still missing.

Eventually, the money and bonds are found under Toby's mattress, which seems to further incriminate him, with a note left admitting that it was a mistake to take the box. Phoebe sees that the notes are not in Toby's handwriting, and seeks to identify whose hand in which they are written. She notes a curl on a T as the most important clue, initially dismissing the spelling "mattrass." When she goes to the telegraph station to call for the governor as this latest bit of evidence suggests a frame up, Dave Hunter will not let her, and she fights her way into the booth, telegraphs the message herself, looks in the register for the price, and pays in exact change. As she does so, she finds and pockets a slip of paper after noticing misspelling "mattrass" related to a shipment.

Finally Duncan Spaythe, the town banker, insists that he took the box, in spite of the two witnesses having seen a woman do so. His son, Eric, though, admits that his father took it from the actual thief, Hazel Chandler, who is Will's daughter and Dave's fiancée, seeking to expedite their marriage in a moment of weakness.

When Cousin John, the governor, learns that the yellow envelope contains the will of Alonzo Clark, Toby's father, he is able to shame Mrs. Ritchie into taking the blame for the theft of her own box, because the will shows that she has stolen dividends from a copper mine Clark had bought and not applied the funds to Toby's upbringing and education as instructed by Alonzo Clark, who was her second cousin. She didn't realize that the will had been probated and existed in file copy at the courthouse.

The night before Toby's impending trial, all of those who supported him have a big party in which they reveal to him his true inheritance and that the case against him has been dismissed. Holbrook has developed his reputation and generated some income based on the case, and invites Toby to become his clerk. Toby declines, wishing to attend law school, but expresses interest in being Holbrook's partner once he passes the bar.
