= The Bluebird Books =

Children's novel series

The Bluebird Books is a series of novels popular with teenage girls in the 1910s and 1920s. The series was begun by L. Frank Baum using his Edith Van Dyne pseudonym, then continued by at least three others, all using the same pseudonym. Baum wrote the first four books in the series, possibly with help from his son, Harry Neal Baum, on the third. The fifth book is based on a fragment by Baum and written by an unknown author. The last five books were written by Emma Speed Sampson. The origin of the title is uncertain, but the books were all published in hardcover with blue cloth.

The books are concerned with adolescent girl detectives — a concept Baum had experimented with earlier, in The Daring Twins (1911) and Phoebe Daring (1912). The Bluebird series began with Mary Louise, originally written as a tribute to Baum's favorite sister, Mary Louise Baum Brewster. Baum's publisher, Reilly & Britton, rejected that manuscript, as they felt the heroine was too independent for a female. Baum wrote a new version of the book; the original manuscript is lost.

The title character is Mary Louise Burrows. In the first books of the series, she is a fifteen-year-old girl with unusual maturity (though the other girls in her boarding school find her somewhat priggish). She confronts the fact that her grandfather is suspected of treason against the United States. With her friends' help, she reveals her grandfather's innocence and uncovers the truth. The novel features federal agent John O'Gorman with assistance from his daughter Josie, whom he trained to be an investigator. (Josie O'Gorman, despite preceding Nancy Drew by more than a decade, is much less traditionally feminine.)

Subsequent novels in the series bring changes on this basic formula. The second book, Mary Louise in the Country, involves the then-contemporary struggle for Irish independence from the United Kingdom of Great Britain and Ireland. Josie O'Gorman, tougher and less ladylike than Mary Louise, has a more prominent role, and eventually takes over the series. Sampson relented and named the last few books after this character.

Marie Louise in the Country contains a passage bearing upon the question of racism in Baum's works. Baum draws a contrast between the crude racist attitude of a local shopkeeper with the more egalitarian attitudes of Marie Louise and her grandfather. Mary Louise and the Liberty Girls is concerned with the strong anti-German sentiments in the United States during World War I.

== Books in the series ==
1. Mary Louise (1916)
2. Mary Louise in the Country (1916)
3. Mary Louise Solves a Mystery (1917)
4. Mary Louise and the Liberty Girls (1918)
5. Mary Louise Adopts a Soldier (1919)
6. Mary Louise at Dorfield (1920)
7. Mary Louise Stands the Test (1921)
8. Mary Louise and Josie O'Gorman (1922)
9. Josie O'Gorman (1923)
10. Josie O'Gorman and the Meddlesome Major (1924)
