= Reilly & Britton =

American publishing company

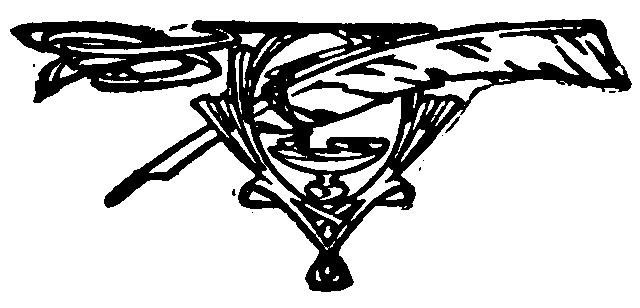
- Status: Defunct
- Predecessor: George M. Hill; Madison Book Company
- Founded: March 1, 1904
- Founder: Frank Kennicott Reilly; Sumner Charles Britton
- Successor: Regnery Publishing; McGraw-Hill
- Country of origin: United States
- Headquarters location: Chicago
- Key people: William F. Lee, Francis J. O'Donnell
- Publication types: Books

The Reilly and Britton Company, known after 1918 as Reilly & Lee, was an American publishing company of the early and middle 20th century, best known for children's and popular culture books from authors like L. Frank Baum and Edgar A. Guest. Founded in 1904 by two former employees of George M. Hill's publishing company, Frank Kennicott Reilly and Charles Sumner Britton. Reilly continued to lead the company until his death in 1932. Britton left the firm around 1916 to start a new company in New York, and for a time the company was guided by William F. Lee, who died in 1924.

== Founding ==
When the Chicago publishing firm of George M. Hill, the publisher of the first edition of Baum's The Wonderful Wizard of Oz (1900), went out of business in March 1902, two of its employees, head salesman Sumner Charles Britton and production manager Frank Kennicott Reilly, formed their own publishing venture, the Madison Book Company of Chicago. (Britton was an Arkansas native who first came to Chicago in 1893, to report on the World's Columbian Exposition for The Kansas City Star. He was strongly enough impressed with the city to relocate there in July 1894.)

In 1904, Reilly and Britton decided to incorporate as a new publishing house under their own names. Needing a name author, the new partners solicited Baum, who was unhappy with his arrangement with Bobbs-Merrill, publisher of several of his previous works. Signing Baum to an exclusive contract (dated 16 January 1904), the partners and their author agreed that the best way to start their joint effort was with a sequel to Baum's greatest success to date. The second of the Oz books, The Marvelous Land of Oz, was in print later in 1904, in time for the Christmas season.

== Success with Baum ==
With a strong initial focus on children's books, the firm published editions of the fairy tales of Hans Christian Andersen and The Brothers Grimm in 1905; but their mainstay in their early years remained L. Frank Baum. Reilly & Britton issued eleven titles by Baum in 1906: the fantasy novel John Dough and the Cherub, under Baum's name; Daughters of Destiny, an adult romance by "Schuyler Staunton;" the juvenile novel Annabel, by "Suzanne Metcalf;" a book for boys, Sam Steele's Adventures on Land and Sea, by "Capt. Hugh Fitzgerald," and one for girls, Aunt Jane's Nieces, by "Edith Van Dyne" — the last one was so successful that it inspired a ten-volume series of the same name. There was also a set of six booklets for small children, collectively known as The Twinkle Tales, by "Laura Bancroft," with illustrations by Maginel Wright Enright. The six were a popular success, selling a total of 40,000 copies, and were later re-printed in one volume, as Twinkle and Chubbins: Their Astonishing Adventures in Nature-Fairyland (1911). The firm paid Baum a 10% royalty on each of the first five books, and two-and-a-half cents per copy on the booklets. (Mindful of his past financial difficulties, Baum also negotiated monthly royalty payments, instead of the more usual yearly payment.) If the six booklets are counted as a single full-length volume, the firm issued six books by Baum in 1906 alone.

Baum continued this high level of productivity for a time, with another six titles published in 1907, five by Reilly & Britton. The five were: Ozma of Oz and Father Goose's Year Book, under his own name; Aunt Jane's Nieces Abroad, by "Edith Van Dyne;" Sam Steele's Adventures in Panama, by "Capt. Fitzgerald" again; and "Laura Bancroft's" Policeman Bluejay. Aunt Jane's Nieces Abroad was printed with the mistaken date of "1906," causing confusion in Baum's bibliography. The 1906-7 Sam Steele titles were not especially successful, though they did better in later years, when they were repackaged as installments of Baum's Boy Fortune Hunters series, by "Floyd Akers." Baum's productivity slackened somewhat after the 1906-7 peak, with four books in 1908, and three each in 1909 and 1910, but five in 1911 and four in 1912; and then two or three books a year for the remainder of his life.

Baum had already been friendly with Britton and Reilly before he signed with them; their friendships continued and developed over the ensuing years. Baum was closer with Britton than Reilly, addressing his letters to the former to "Brit," and to the latter to "Mr. Reilly" — though both men and their families visited "The Sign of the Goose," the Baums' summer home in Macatawa Park, Michigan.

Since Baum was their star writer, the firm promoted his works prominently and imaginatively, with contests, paper cut-outs of Oz characters, press releases in Oz-newspaper format, and similar tactics. When Baum became enmeshed in financial difficulties in 1911, Reilly & Britton put him on salary (though the move wasn't enough to forestall Baum's bankruptcy in June of that year).

Other books they published include the Captain Becky series by Margaret Love Sanderson, The Blue Ridge series (Azalea) by Ella W. Peattie, the Bunty Prescott series by Major M. J. Phillips, The Airship Boys Series by H. L. Sayler, The Boy Scouts of the Air series by Gordon Stuart, The Boys' Big Game series, Travel Notes Abroad: My Own Record by Clara Powers Wilson, and The Girl Graduate: Her Own Book, an illustrated novelty for the girl to fill in, similar to John R. Neill's The Bride: Her Wedding Book.

Even with their heavy concentration on children's books, the partners also published general purpose works of fact and fiction, including the poetry of Edgar Guest and some of the works of Harold Bell Wright; they also published sports-related material, especially baseball books. They even tried the periodical side of publishing, with a venture called The Book Crier, subtitled "A Magazine of Optimism." (As is sometimes true of optimism itself, the "Magazine of Optimism" did not endure.)

== Later period ==
The company went through a re-organization in 1919, when Britton's share was sold to long-time employee William F. Lee; the partnership was renamed Reilly & Lee. The company continued the Oz book series after Baum's 1919 death, with titles by successive "Royal Historians of Oz" Ruth Plumly Thompson, John R. Neill, Jack Snow, Rachel R. Cosgrove, and Eloise Jarvis Hamilton-McGraw. The Bluebird Books also continued for five additional volumes with Emma Speed Sampson assuming the Edith Van Dyne pseudonym The firm pursued some imaginative promotional activities for its Oz books through the 1920s, with comic strips, a fan club and plays for children, and other tactics — though these largely ceased with the 1932 death of Frank K. Reilly. Frank J. O'Donnell served as president of the company in the 1940s and the early 1950s.

They published That Summer on Catalpa Street by Louise Pliss in 1961.

While the firm never grew to be one of the major publishing houses of its era, it remained in business through six decades. In 1959 the company was purchased by the Henry Regnery Co., which for a time maintained Reilly & Lee as a separate imprint for Oz books and related titles. (In turn, Henry Regnery later assigned the Oz series to Contemporary Books, also of Chicago, which eventually was absorbed as a division of McGraw-Hill.)

== Bibliography ==
- Carpenter, Angelica Shirley, and Jean Shirley. L. Frank Baum: Royal Historian of Oz. Minneapolis, Lerner Publications Co., 1992.
- Gardner, Martin. Are Universes Thicker Than Blackberries? New York, W. W. Norton, 2003.
- Greene, David L., and Dick Martin. The Oz Scrapbook. New York, Random House, 1977.
- Meyer, Fred M. "Notes from the Royal Historian." The Baum Bugle, Vol. 2 No. 1 (March 1958).
- Rogers, Katharine Munzer. L. Frank Baum, Creator of Oz: A Biography. New York, St. Martin's Press, 2002.
