= L. Frank Baum =

American author (1856–1919)

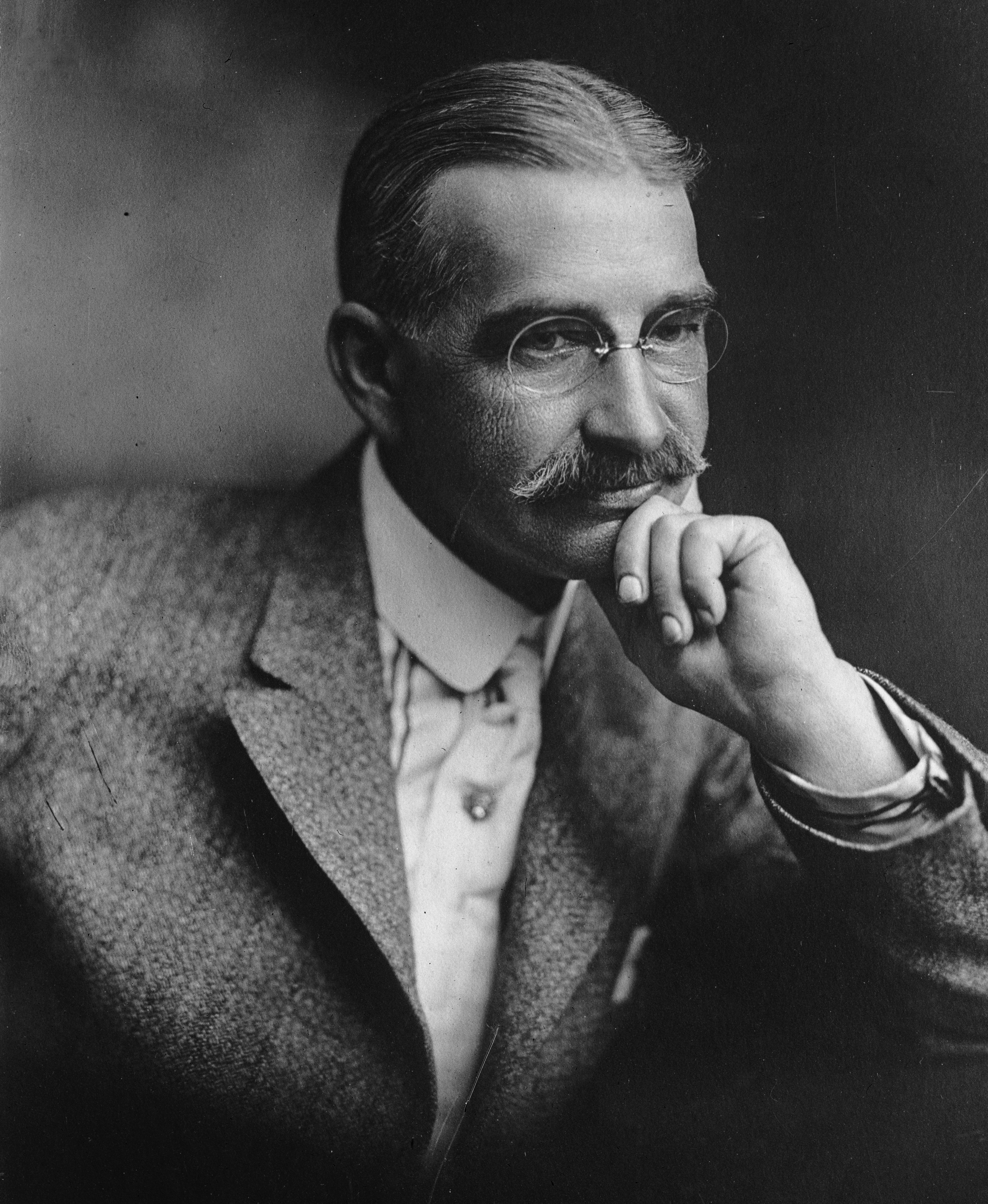
- Baum, c. 1911
- Born: Lyman Frank Baum; May 15, 1856; Chittenango, New York, U.S.
- Died: May 6, 1919 (aged 62); Los Angeles, California, U.S.
- Resting place: Forest Lawn Memorial Park
- Occupation: Author
- Spouse: Maud Gage (m. 1882)
- Children: 4, including Frank and Harry
- Relatives: Matilda Joslyn Gage (mother-in-law); Roger S. Baum (great-grandson)
- Writing career
- Pen name: George Brooks; Louis F. Baum; Laura Bancroft; Suzanne Metcalf; Capt. Hugh Fitzgerald; Schuyler Staunton; Edith Van Dyne; Floyd Akers; John Estes Cooke
- Genres: Fantasy; poetry; short stories

Lyman Frank Baum (/bɔːm/; May 15, 1856 – May 6, 1919) was an American author. He was best known for his children's fantasy books, particularly The Wonderful Wizard of Oz, part of a series. In addition to the 14 Oz books, Baum penned 41 other novels (not including four lost, unpublished novels), 83 short stories, over 200 poems, and at least 42 scripts. He made numerous attempts to bring his works to the stage and screen; the 1939 adaptation of the first Oz book became a landmark of 20th-century cinema.

Born and raised in Chittenango, New York, Baum moved west after an unsuccessful stint as a theater producer and playwright. He and his wife opened a store in Aberdeen, South Dakota, and he edited and published a newspaper, The Aberdeen Saturday Pioneer. They then moved to Chicago, where he worked as a newspaper reporter and published children's literature, coming out with the first Oz book in 1900. While continuing his writing, among his final projects he sought to establish a film studio in Los Angeles, California.

His works anticipated such later commonplace things as television, augmented reality, laptop computers (The Master Key), wireless telephones (Tik-Tok of Oz), women in high-risk and action-heavy occupations (Mary Louise in the Country), and the ubiquity of advertising on clothing (Aunt Jane's Nieces at Work).

== Childhood and early life ==
Baum was born in Chittenango, New York, in 1856 into a devout Methodist family. He had German, Scots-Irish, and English ancestry. He was the seventh of nine children of Cynthia Ann (née Stanton) and Benjamin Ward Baum, only five of whom survived into adulthood. "Lyman" was the name of his father's brother (Lyman Spaulding Baum), but he always disliked it and preferred his middle name "Frank".

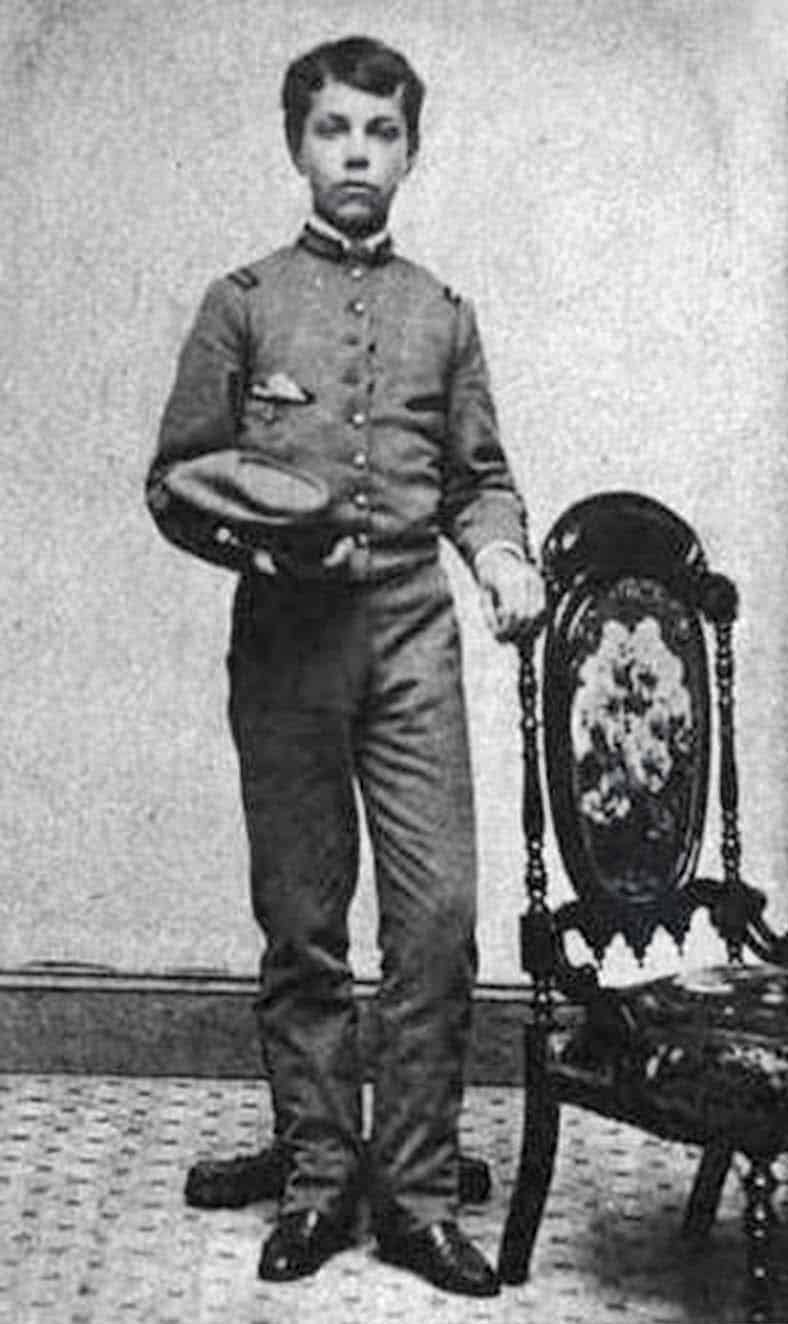
Young Baum in the Peekskill Military Academy

His father succeeded in many businesses, including barrel-making, oil drilling in Pennsylvania, and real estate. Baum grew up on his parents' expansive estate called Rose Lawn, which he fondly recalled as a sort of paradise. Rose Lawn was located in Mattydale, New York. Baum was a sickly, dreamy child, tutored at home with his siblings. From the age of 12, he spent two years at Peekskill Military Academy but, after being severely disciplined for daydreaming, he had a possibly psychogenic heart attack and was allowed to return home.

Baum started writing early in life, possibly prompted by his father buying him a cheap printing press. He had always been close to his younger brother Henry (Harry) Clay Baum, who helped in the production of The Rose Lawn Home Journal. The brothers published several issues of the journal, including advertisements from local businesses, which they gave to family and friends for free. By age 17, Baum established a second amateur journal, The Stamp Collector; printed an 11-page pamphlet, Baum's Complete Stamp Dealers' Directory, co-written by Henry Clay Baum and William Norris; and started a stamp dealership with friends.

At 20, Baum took on the national craze of breeding poultry. He specialized in raising the Hamburg chicken. In March 1880, he established a monthly trade journal, The Poultry Record. In 1886, when Baum was 30 years old, his first book was published: The Book of the Hamburgs: A Brief Treatise upon the Mating, Rearing, and Management of the Different Varieties of Hamburgs.

Baum had a flair for being the spotlight of fun in the household, including during times of financial difficulties. His selling of fireworks made the Fourth of July memorable. His skyrockets, Roman candles, and fireworks filled the sky, while many people around the neighborhood would gather in front of the house to watch the displays. Christmas was even more festive. Baum dressed as Santa Claus for the family. His father would place the Christmas tree behind a curtain in the front parlor so that Baum could talk to everyone while he decorated the tree without people managing to see him. He maintained this tradition all his life.

== Career ==
=== Theater ===
Baum embarked on his lifetime infatuation—and wavering financial success—with the theater. A local theatrical company duped him into replenishing their stock of costumes on the promise of leading roles coming his way. Disillusioned, Baum left the theater—temporarily—and went to work as a clerk in his brother-in-law's dry goods company in Syracuse. This experience may have influenced his story "The Suicide of Kiaros", first published in the literary journal The White Elephant. A fellow clerk one day had been found locked in a store room dead, probably from suicide.

Baum could never stay away long from the stage. He performed in plays under the stage names of Louis F. Baum and George Brooks. In 1880, his father built him a theater in Richburg, New York, and Baum set about writing plays and gathering a company to act in them. The Maid of Arran proved a modest success, a melodrama with songs based on William Black's novel A Princess of Thule. Baum wrote the play and composed songs for it (making it a prototypical musical, as its songs relate to the narrative), and acted in the leading role. His aunt Katharine Gray played his character's aunt. She was the founder of Syracuse Oratory School, and Baum advertised his services in her catalog to teach theater, including stage business, play writing, directing, translating (French, German, and Italian), revision, and operettas.

On November 9, 1882, Baum married Maud Gage, a daughter of Matilda Joslyn Gage, a famous women's suffrage and feminist activist. A local newspaper reported that their ceremony was "one of equality" and that their marriage vows were "precisely the same." While Baum was touring with The Maid of Arran, the theater in Richburg caught fire during a production of Baum's ironically titled parlor drama Matches, destroying the theater as well as the only known copies of many of Baum's scripts, including Matches, as well as costumes.

=== The South Dakota years ===
In July 1888, Baum and his wife moved to Aberdeen, Dakota Territory where he opened a store, Baum's Bazaar. His habit of giving out wares on credit led to the eventual bankrupting of the store, so Baum turned to editing the local newspaper The Aberdeen Saturday Pioneer where he wrote the column Our Landlady. Following the death of Sitting Bull at the hands of Indian agency police, Baum recommended the wholesale extermination of all America's native peoples in a column that he wrote on December 20, 1890 (full text below). It is unclear whether Baum meant it as a satire or not, especially since his mother-in-law Matilda Joslyn Gage received an honorary adoption into the Wolf Clan of the Mohawk Nation and was a fierce defender of Native American rights, but on January 3, 1891, he returned to the subject in an editorial response to the Wounded Knee Massacre:

The Pioneer has before declared that our only safety depends upon the total extirmination [sic] of the Indians. Having wronged them for centuries, we had better, in order to protect our civilization, follow it up by one more wrong and wipe these untamed and untamable creatures from the face of the earth.

Baum's description of Kansas in The Wonderful Wizard of Oz is based on his experiences in drought-ridden South Dakota. During much of this time, his mother-in-law was living in the Baum household. While Baum was in South Dakota, he sang in a quartet which included James Kyle, who became one of the first Populist (People's Party) senators in the US.

=== Writing ===
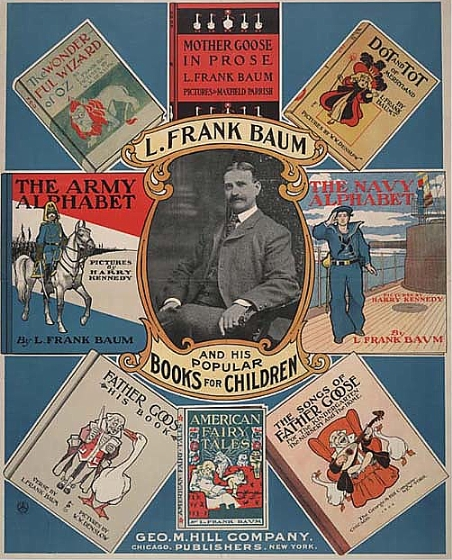
Promotional Poster for Baum's "Popular Books For Children", c. 1901

Baum's newspaper failed in 1891, and he, Maud, and their four sons moved to the Humboldt Park section of Chicago, where Baum took a job reporting for the Evening Post.

Beginning in 1897, he founded and edited a magazine called The Show Window, later known as the Merchants Record and Show Window, which focused on store window displays, retail strategies and visual merchandising. The major department stores of the time created elaborate Christmas time fantasies, using clockwork mechanisms that made people and animals appear to move. The former Show Window magazine is still currently in operation, now known as VMSD (visual merchandising + store design), based in Cincinnati.

In 1900, Baum published a book about window displays in which he stressed the importance of mannequins in drawing customers. He also had to work as a traveling salesman.

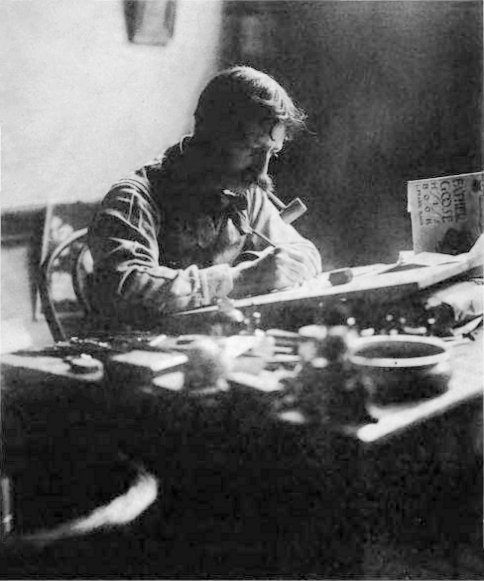
Denslow in 1900

In 1897, he wrote and published Mother Goose in Prose, a collection of Mother Goose rhymes written as prose stories and illustrated by Maxfield Parrish. Mother Goose was a moderate success and allowed Baum to quit his sales job (which had had a negative impact on his health). In 1899, Baum partnered with illustrator W. W. Denslow to publish Father Goose, His Book, a collection of nonsense poetry. The book was a success, becoming the best-selling children's book of the year.

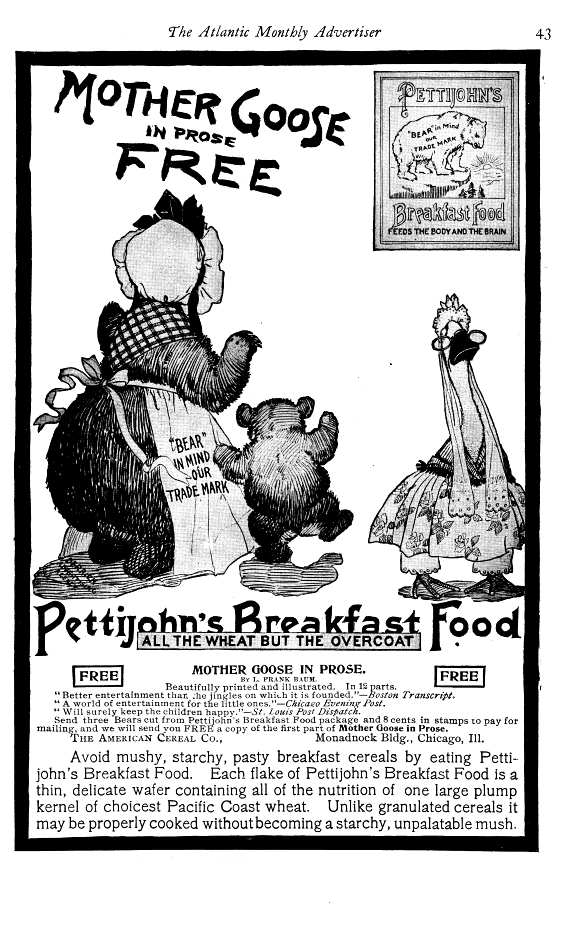
The Baum–Parrish Mother Goose used to promote a breakfast cereal (part 1 of 12 as a free premium)

==== The Wonderful Wizard of Oz ====
In 1900, Baum and Denslow (with whom he shared the copyright) published The Wonderful Wizard of Oz to much critical acclaim and financial success. The book was the best-selling children's book for two years after its initial publication. Baum went on to write thirteen more novels based on the places and people of the Land of Oz.

==== The Wizard of Oz: Fred R. Hamlin's Musical Extravaganza ====
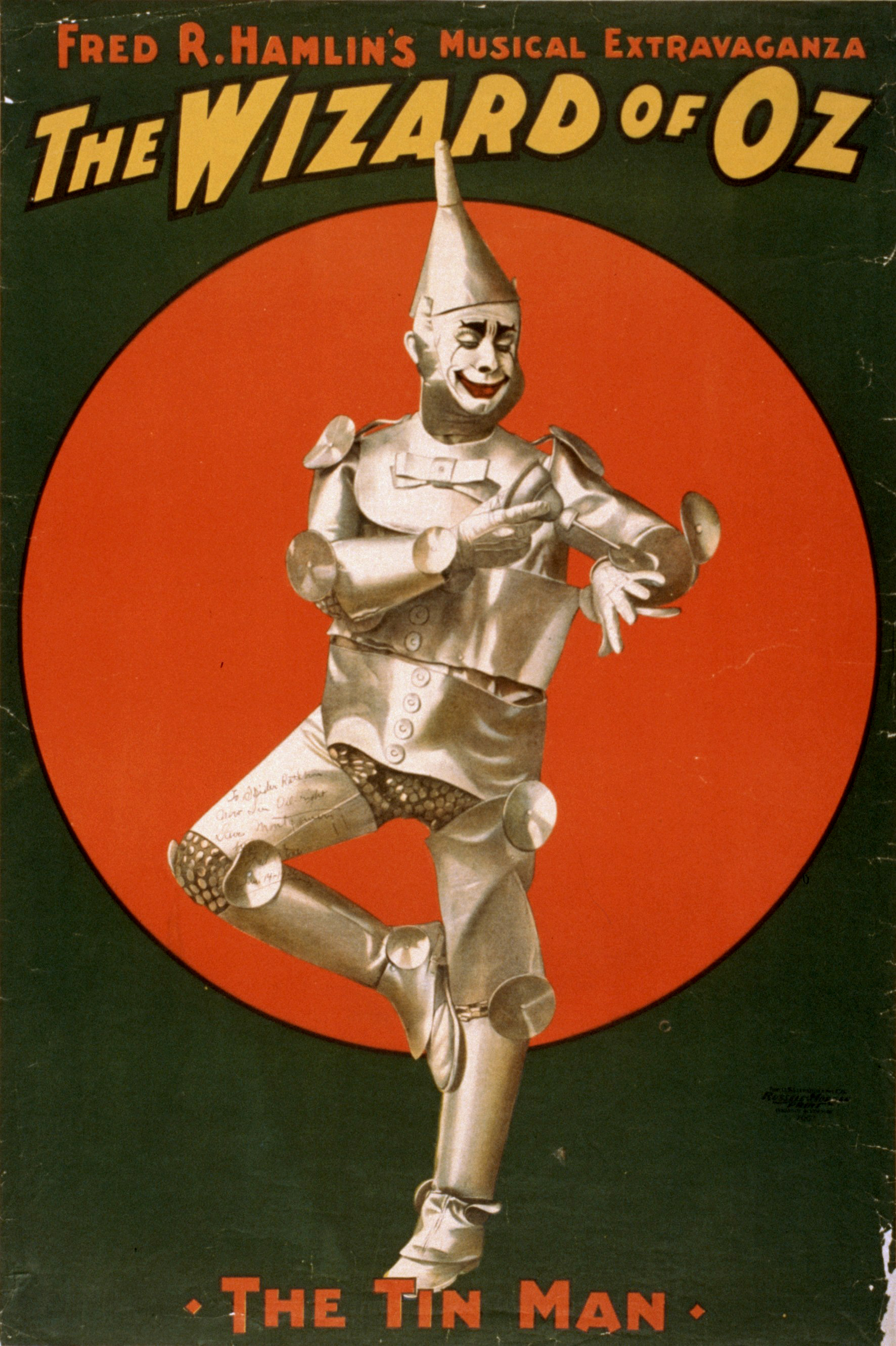
1903 poster of Dave Montgomery as the Tin Man in Hamlin's musical stage version

Two years after Wizard's publication, Baum and Denslow teamed up with composer Paul Tietjens and director Julian Mitchell to produce a musical stage version of the book under Fred R. Hamlin. Baum and Tietjens had worked on a musical of The Wonderful Wizard of Oz in 1901 and based closely upon the book, but it was rejected. This stage version opened in Chicago in 1902 (the first to use the shortened title "The Wizard of Oz"), then ran on Broadway for 293 stage nights from January to October 1903. It returned to Broadway in 1904, where it played from March to May and again from November to December. It successfully toured the United States with much of the same cast, as was done in those days, until 1911, and then became available for amateur use. The stage version starred Anna Laughlin as Dorothy Gale, alongside David C. Montgomery and Fred Stone as the Tin Woodman and Scarecrow respectively, which shot the pair to instant fame.

The stage version differed quite a bit from the book, and it was aimed primarily at adults. Toto was replaced with Imogene the Cow, and Tryxie Tryfle (a waitress) and Pastoria (a streetcar operator) were added as fellow cyclone victims. The Wicked Witch of the West was eliminated entirely in the script, and the plot became about how the four friends were allied with the usurping Wizard and were hunted as traitors to Pastoria II, the rightful King of Oz. It is unclear how much control or influence Baum had on the script; it appears that many of the changes were written by Baum against his wishes due to contractual requirements with Hamlin. Jokes in the script, mostly written by Glen MacDonough, called for explicit references to President Theodore Roosevelt, Senator Mark Hanna, Rev. Andrew Danquer, and oil tycoon John D. Rockefeller. Although use of the script was rather free-form, the line about Hanna was ordered dropped as soon as Hamlin got word of his death in 1904.

Beginning with the success of the stage version, most subsequent versions of the story, including newer editions of the novel, have been titled "The Wizard of Oz", rather than using the full, original title. In more recent years, restoring the full title has become increasingly common, particularly to distinguish the novel from the Hollywood film.

Baum wrote a new Oz book, The Marvelous Land of Oz, with a view to making it into a stage production, which was titled The Woggle-Bug, but Montgomery and Stone balked at appearing when the original was still running. The Scarecrow and Tin Woodman were then omitted from this adaptation, which was seen as a self-rip-off by critics and proved to be a major flop before it could reach Broadway. He also worked for years on a musical version of Ozma of Oz, which eventually became The Tik-Tok Man of Oz. This did fairly well in Los Angeles but not well enough to convince producer Oliver Morosco to mount a production in New York. He also began a stage version of The Patchwork Girl of Oz, but this was ultimately realized as a film.

== Later life and work ==
With the success of Wizard on page and stage, Baum and Denslow hoped for further success and published Dot and Tot of Merryland in 1901. The book was one of Baum's weakest, and its failure further strained his faltering relationship with Denslow. It was their last collaboration. Baum worked primarily with John R. Neill on his fantasy work beginning in 1904, but Baum met Neill few times (all before he moved to California) and often found Neill's art not humorous enough for his liking. He was particularly offended when Neill published The Oz Toy Book: Cut-outs for the Kiddies without authorization.

Baum reportedly designed the chandeliers in the Crown Room of the Hotel del Coronado; however, that attribution has yet to be corroborated. Several times during the development of the Oz series, Baum declared that he had written his last Oz book and devoted himself to other works of fantasy fiction based in other magical lands, including The Life and Adventures of Santa Claus and Queen Zixi of Ix. However, he returned to the series each time, persuaded by popular demand, letters from children, and the failure of his new books. Even so, his other works remained very popular after his death, with The Master Key appearing on St. Nicholas Magazine's survey of readers' favorite books well into the 1920s.

In 1905, Baum declared plans for an Oz amusement park. In an interview, he mentioned buying "Pedloe Island" off the coast of California to turn it into an Oz park. However, there is no evidence that he purchased such an island, and no one has ever been able to find any island whose name even resembles Pedloe in that area. Nevertheless, Baum stated to the press that he had discovered a Pedloe Island off the coast of California and that he had purchased it to be "the Marvelous Land of Oz," intending it to be "a fairy paradise for children." Eleven-year-old Dorothy Talbot of San Francisco was reported to be ascendant to the throne on March 1, 1906, when the Palace of Oz was expected to be completed. Baum planned to live on the island, with administrative duties handled by the princess and her all-child advisers. Plans included statues of the Scarecrow, Tin Woodman, Jack Pumpkinhead, and H.M. Woggle-Bug, T.E. Baum abandoned his Oz park project after the failure of The Woggle-Bug, which was playing at the Garrick Theatre in 1905.

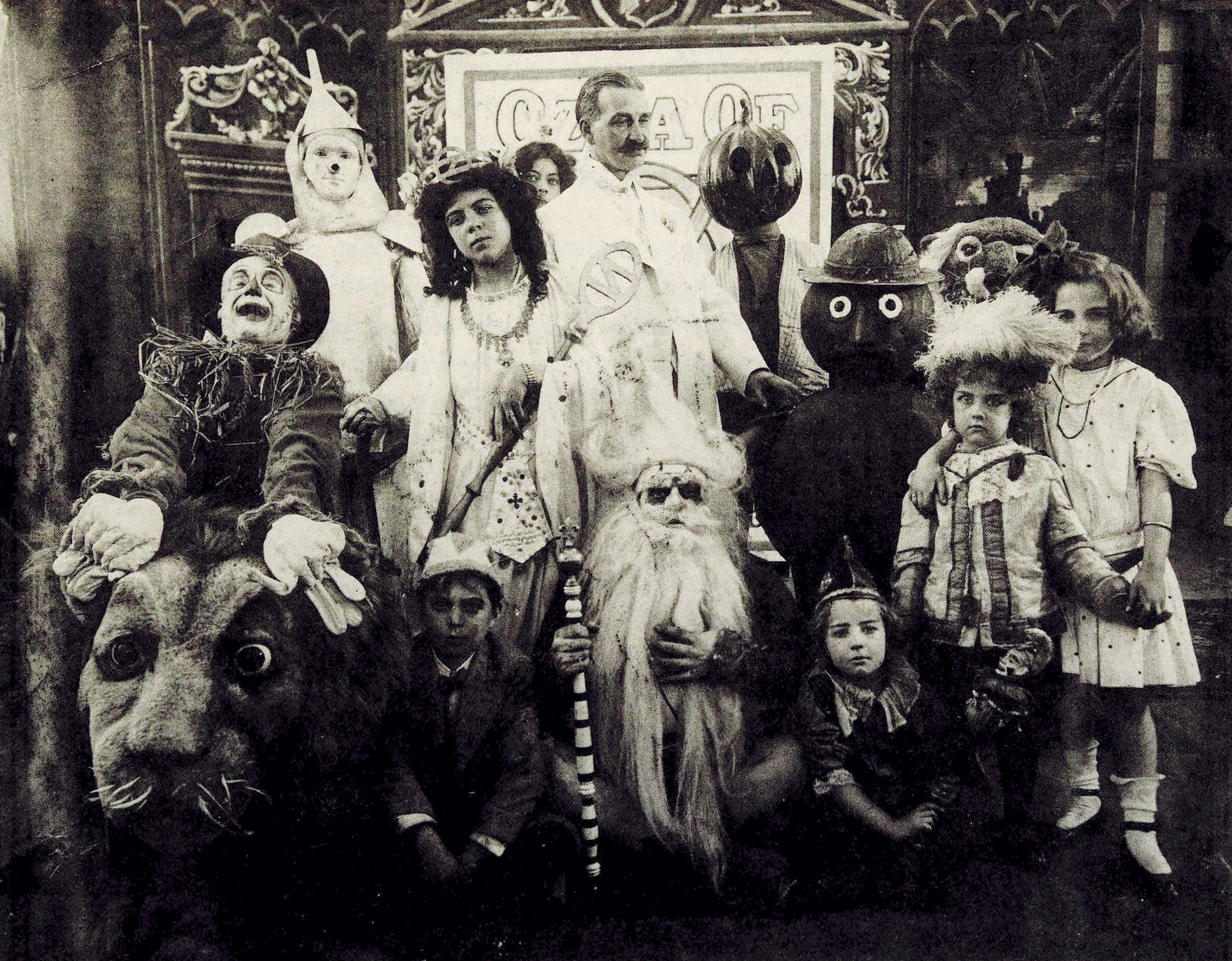
Baum surrounded by the characters in The Fairylogue and Radio-Plays

Because of his lifelong love of theater, he financed elaborate musicals, often to his financial detriment. One of Baum's worst financial endeavors was his The Fairylogue and Radio-Plays (1908), which combined a slideshow, film, and live actors with a lecture by Baum as if he were giving a travelogue to Oz. However, Baum ran into trouble and could not pay his debts to the company who produced the films. He did not get back to a stable financial situation for several years, after he sold the royalty rights to many of his earlier works, including The Wonderful Wizard of Oz. This resulted in the M.A. Donahue Company publishing cheap editions of his early works with advertising which purported that Baum's newer output was inferior to the less expensive books that they were releasing. He claimed bankruptcy in August 1911. However, Baum had shrewdly transferred most of his property into Maud's name, except for his clothing, his typewriter, and his library (mostly of children's books, such as the fairy tales of Andrew Lang, whose portrait he kept in his study)—all of which, he successfully argued, were essential to his occupation. Maud handled the finances anyway, and thus Baum lost much less than he could have.

Baum made use of several pseudonyms for some of his other non-Oz books. They include:

- Edith Van Dyne (the Aunt Jane's Nieces series)
- Laura Bancroft (The Twinkle Tales, Policeman Bluejay)
- Floyd Akers (The Boy Fortune Hunters series, continuing the Sam Steele series)
- Suzanne Metcalf (Annabel)
- Schuyler Staunton (The Fate of a Crown, Daughters of Destiny)
- John Estes Cooke (Tamawaca Folks)
- Capt. Hugh Fitzgerald (the Sam Steele series)

Baum also anonymously wrote The Last Egyptian: A Romance of the Nile. He continued theatrical work with Harry Marston Haldeman's men's social group The Uplifters, for which he wrote several plays for various celebrations. He also wrote the group's parodic by-laws. The group also included Will Rogers, but it was proud to have had Baum as a member and posthumously revived many of his works despite their ephemeral intent. Many of these play's titles are known, but only The Uplift of Lucifer is known to survive (it was published in a limited edition in the 1960s). Prior to that, his last produced play was The Tik-Tok Man of Oz (based on Ozma of Oz and the basis for Tik-Tok of Oz), a modest success in Hollywood that producer Oliver Morosco decided did not do well enough to take to Broadway. Morosco, incidentally, quickly turned to film production, as did Baum.

In 1914, Baum started his own film production company The Oz Film Manufacturing Company, which came as an outgrowth of the Uplifters. He served as its president and principal producer and screenwriter. The rest of the board consisted of Louis F. Gottschalk, Harry Marston Haldeman, and Clarence R. Rundel. The films were directed by J. Farrell MacDonald, with casts that included Violet MacMillan, Vivian Reed, Mildred Harris, Juanita Hansen, Pierre Couderc, Mai Welles, Louise Emmons, J. Charles Haydon, and early appearances by Harold Lloyd and Hal Roach. Silent film actor Richard Rosson appeared in one of the films (Rosson's younger brother Harold Rosson was the cinematographer on The Wizard of Oz, released in 1939). After little success probing the unrealized children's film market, Baum acknowledged his authorship of The Last Egyptian and made a film of it (portions of which are included in Decasia), but the Oz name had become box office poison for the time being, and even a name change to Dramatic Feature Films and transfer of ownership to Frank Joslyn Baum did not help. Baum invested none of his own money in the venture, unlike The Fairylogue and Radio-Plays, but the stress probably took its toll on his health.

== Personal life and death ==
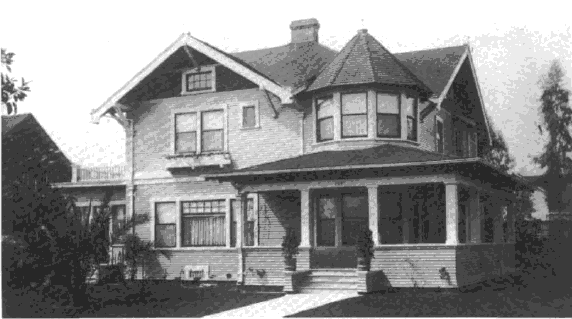
Ozcot, Hollywood, California, in 1911

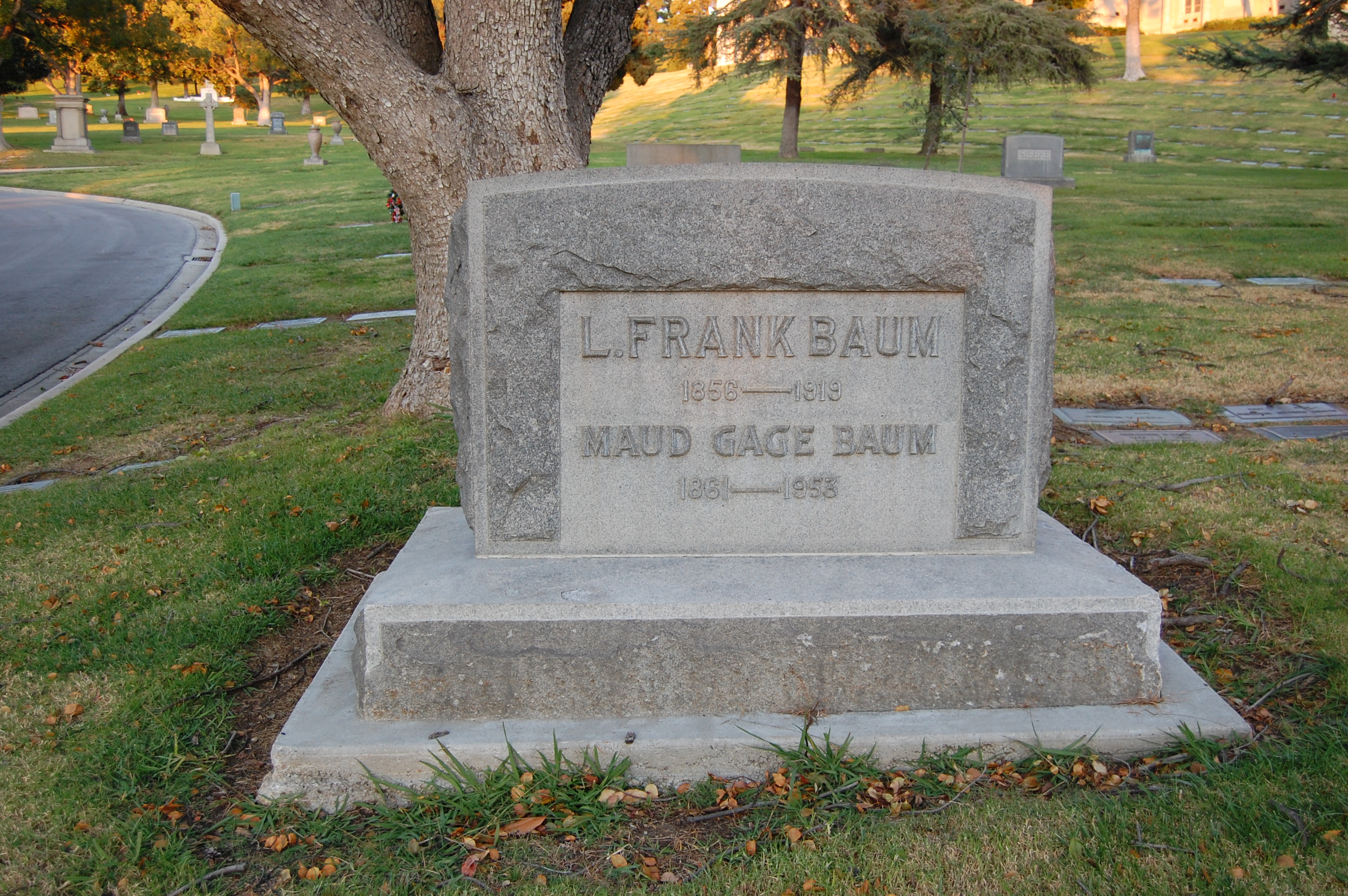
Baum's grave at Forest Lawn Cemetery in Glendale, California, in 2011

On May 5, 1919, Baum suffered a stroke, slipped into a coma and died the following day, nine days before his 63rd birthday. His last words were spoken to his wife during a brief period of lucidity: "Now we can cross the Shifting Sands." He was buried in Glendale's Forest Lawn Memorial Park Cemetery.

His final Oz book, Glinda of Oz, was published on July 10, 1920, a year after his death. The Oz series was continued long after his death by other authors, notably Ruth Plumly Thompson, who wrote an additional twenty-one Oz books.

== Baum's beliefs ==
=== Political ===
==== Racial views ====
During the period of the 1890 Ghost Dance movement and Wounded Knee Massacre, Baum wrote two editorials asserting that the safety of American settlers depended on the wholesale genocide of Native Americans. These editorials were republished in 1990 by sociologist Robert Venables of Cornell University, who argues that Baum was not using sarcasm. Historian Camilla Townsend, the editor of American Indian History: A Documentary Reader, argued that the editorial was "[a]gainst character", as he had earlier published a piece that criticized the idea of White Americans fearing Native Americans; Townsend stated that she failed to find evidence that Baum was using sarcasm.

The first piece was published on December 20, 1890, five days after the killing of the Lakota Sioux holy man Sitting Bull. The piece opined that with Sitting Bull's death, "the nobility of the Redskin" had been extinguished, and the safety of the frontier would not be established until there was "total annihilation" of the remaining Native Americans, who, he claimed, lived as "miserable wretches." Baum said that their extermination should not be regretted, and their elimination would "do justice to the manly characteristics" of their ancestors.

The Wounded Knee Massacre occurred nine days later; the second editorial was published on January 3, 1891. Baum alleged that General Nelson A. Miles' weak rule on the Native Americans had caused American soldiers to suffer a "terrible loss of blood", in a "battle" which had been a disgrace to the Department of War. He found that the "disaster" could have easily been prevented with proper preparations. Baum reiterated that he believed, due to the history of mistreatment of Native Americans, that the extermination of the "untamed and untamable" tribes was necessary to protect American settlers. Baum ended the editorial with the following anecdote: "An eastern contemporary, with a grain of wisdom in its wit, says that 'when the whites win a fight, it is a victory, and when the Indians win it, it is a massacre.'"

In 2006, two descendants of Baum apologized to the Sioux nation for any hurt that their ancestor had caused.

The short story "The Enchanted Buffalo" claims to be a legend about a tribe of bison, and it states that a key element of it made it into the legends of Native American tribes. Baum mentions his characters' distaste for a Hopi snake dance in Aunt Jane's Nieces and Uncle John, but he also deplores the horrible situation which exists on Native American reservations. Aunt Jane's Nieces on the Ranch features a hard-working Mexican in order to disprove Anglo-American stereotypes which portray Mexicans as lazy. Baum's mother-in-law and woman's suffrage leader Matilda Joslyn Gage strongly influenced his views. Gage was initiated into the Wolf Clan and admitted into the Iroquois Council of Matrons in recognition of her outspoken respect and sympathy for the Native American people.

==== Women's suffrage advocate ====
When Baum lived in Aberdeen, South Dakota, where he was secretary of its Equal Suffrage Club, much of the politics in the Republican Aberdeen Saturday Pioneer dealt with trying to convince the populace to vote for women's suffrage. Susan B. Anthony visited Aberdeen and stayed with the Baums. Nancy Tystad Koupal notes an apparent loss of interest in editorializing after Aberdeen failed to pass the bill for women's enfranchisement.

Sally Roesch Wagner of The Matilda Joslyn Gage Foundation published The Wonderful Mother of Oz, describing how Matilda Gage's feminist politics were sympathetically channeled by Baum into his Oz books. Some of Baum's contacts with suffragists of his day seem to have inspired much of The Marvelous Land of Oz. In this story, General Jinjur leads the girls and women of Oz in a revolt, armed with knitting needles; they succeed and make the men do the household chores. Jinjur proves to be an incompetent ruler, but Princess Ozma, who advocates gender equality, is ultimately placed on the throne. Charlotte Perkins Gilman's 1915 classic of feminist science fiction, Herland, bears strong similarities to The Emerald City of Oz (1910); the link between Baum and Gilman is considered to be Gage. Baum's stories outside of Oz also contain feminist or egalitarian themes. His Edith Van Dyne stories depict girls and young women engaging in traditionally masculine activities, including Aunt Jane's Nieces and The Flying Girl and its sequel. The Bluebird Books feature a girl sleuth.

==== Political imagery in The Wizard of Oz ====
Numerous political references to the "Wizard" appeared early in the 20th century. Henry Littlefield, an upstate New York high school history teacher, wrote a scholarly article in 1964, the first full-fledged interpretation of the novel as an extended metaphor of the politics and characters of the 1890s. He paid special attention to the Populist metaphors and debates over silver and gold. He published a poem in support of William McKinley.

Since 1964, many scholars, economists, and historians have expanded on Littlefield's interpretation, pointing to multiple similarities between the characters (especially as depicted in Denslow's illustrations) and stock figures from editorial cartoons of the period. Littlefield wrote to The New York Times letters to the editor section spelling out that his theory had no basis in fact, but that his original point was "not to label Baum, or to lessen any of his magic, but rather, as a history teacher at Mount Vernon High School, to invest turn-of-the-century America with the imagery and wonder I have always found in his stories."

Baum's newspaper had addressed politics in the 1890s, and Denslow was an editorial cartoonist as well as an illustrator of children's books. A series of political references is included in the 1902 stage version, such as references to the President, to a powerful senator, and to John D. Rockefeller for providing the oil needed by the Tin Woodman. Scholars have found few political references in Baum's Oz books after 1902. Baum was asked whether his stories had hidden meanings, but he always replied that they were written to "please children".

=== Literary ===
Baum's avowed intentions with the Oz books and his other fairy tales was to retell tales such as those which are found in the works of the Brothers Grimm and Hans Christian Andersen, remake them in an American vein, update them, omit stereotypical characters such as dwarfs or genies, and remove the association of violence and moral teachings. His first Oz books contained a fair amount of violence, but the amount of it decreased as the series progressed; in The Emerald City of Oz, Ozma objects to the use of violence, even to the use of violence against the Nomes who threaten Oz with invasion. His introduction is often cited as the beginning of the sanitization of children's stories, although he did not do a great deal more than eliminate harsh moral lessons.

Another traditional element that Baum intentionally omitted was the emphasis on romance. He considered romantic love to be uninteresting to young children, as well as largely incomprehensible. In The Wonderful Wizard of Oz, the only elements of romance lay in the background of the Tin Woodman and his love for Nimmie Amee, which explains his condition but does not affect the tale in any other way, and the background of Gayelette and the enchantment of the winged monkeys. The only other stories with such elements were The Scarecrow of Oz and Tik-Tok of Oz; both of them were based on dramatizations, which Baum regarded warily until his readers accepted them.

=== Religion ===
Baum was originally a Methodist, but he joined the Episcopal Church in Aberdeen in order to participate in community theatricals. Later, he and his wife were encouraged to become members of the Theosophical Society in 1892 by Matilda Joslyn Gage. Baum's beliefs are frequently reflected in his writings; however, the only mention of a church in his Oz books is the porcelain one which the Cowardly Lion breaks in the Dainty China Country in The Wonderful Wizard of Oz. The Baums sent their older sons to "Ethical Culture Sunday School" in Chicago, which taught morality, not religion.

Writers including Evan I. Schwartz among others have suggested that Baum intentionally used allegory and symbolism in The Wonderful Wizard of Oz to convey concepts that are central to spiritual teachings such as Theosophy and Buddhism. They postulate that the main characters' experiences in Oz represent the soul's journey toward enlightenment. Schwartz specifically states that key plot elements of the book take "the reader on a journey guided by Eastern philosophy" (Schwartz, p. 265). An article in BBC Culture lists several allegorical interpretations of the book including that it may be viewed as a parable of Theosophy. The article cites various symbols and their possible meanings, for example the Yellow Brick Road representing the 'Golden Path' in Buddhism, along which the soul travels to a state of spiritual realization.

Baum's own writing suggests he believed the story may have been divinely inspired: "It was pure inspiration. It came to me right out of the blue. I think that sometimes the Great Author had a message to get across and He was to use the instrument at hand".

== Bibliography ==
=== Land of Oz works ===
- The Wonderful Wizard of Oz (1900)
- The Marvelous Land of Oz (1904)
- Queer Visitors from the Marvelous Land of Oz (1905, comic strip depicting 27 stories)
- The Woggle-Bug Book (1905)
- Ozma of Oz (1907)
- Dorothy and the Wizard in Oz (1908)
- The Road to Oz (1909)
- The Emerald City of Oz (1910)
- The Patchwork Girl of Oz (1913)
- Little Wizard Stories of Oz (1913, collection of 6 short stories)
- Tik-Tok of Oz (1914)
- The Scarecrow of Oz (1915)
- Rinkitink in Oz (1916)
- The Lost Princess of Oz (1917)
- The Tin Woodman of Oz (1918)
- The Magic of Oz (1919, posthumously published)
- Glinda of Oz (1920, posthumously published)

1921's The Royal Book of Oz was posthumously attributed to Baum but was entirely the work of Ruth Plumly Thompson.

=== Other fantasy works ===
- Mother Goose in Prose (1897)
- A New Wonderland (1900), revised as The Magical Monarch of Mo (1903)
- Dot and Tot of Merryland (1901)
- The Master Key (1901)
- American Fairy Tales (1901)
- The Life and Adventures of Santa Claus (1902)
- The Enchanted Island of Yew (1903)
- Queen Zixi of Ix (1905)
- The Twinkle Tales (1905)
- John Dough and the Cherub (1906)
- Policeman Bluejay (1907)
- The Sea Fairies (1911)
- Sky Island (1912)
- Animal Fairy Tales (1969, posthumously collected)

=== Other works ===
- By the Candelabra's Glare (1898)
- Father Goose: His Book (1899)
- The Fate of a Crown (1905)
- Daughters of Destiny (1906)
- Annabel (1906)
- Aunt Jane's Nieces (book series, 1906–1918)
- The Last Egyptian (1907)
- Father Goose's Year Book (1907)
- Boy Fortune Hunters (book series, 1908–1911)
- The Flying Girl (1911)
- The Daring Twins (1911)
- Phoebe Daring (1912)
- The Bluebird Books (book series, 1916–1918)

== Legacy and popular culture ==
- A 1970 episode of the long-running American Western anthology series Death Valley Days presents a highly romanticized portrayal of Baum's time in South Dakota. The comedic teleplay, titled "The Wizard of Aberdeen", stars Conlan Carter as Baum and Beverlee McKinsey as Maud. Although the 30-minute presentation touches on Baum's family life and his struggles in Aberdeen as a newspaper editor, it focuses principally on his storytelling to local children about characters in a distant land he initially refers to as "Ooz".
- John Ritter portrayed Baum in the television film The Dreamer of Oz: The L. Frank Baum Story (1990).
- Jeffrey Combs portrays a highly fictionalized L. Frank Baum, depicted as a farmer from Kansas in the 1890s, in a flashback subplot in Dorothy and the Witches of Oz (2011).
- Zach Braff plays Frank Baum, part owner of Oscar Diggs' circus in 1905, in Oz the Great and Powerful (2013). While named in tribute to the author, the character is not actually meant to be him.
- In 2013, Baum was inducted into the Chicago Literary Hall of Fame.

== See also ==
- Ruth Plumly Thompson
