= Plays of L. Frank Baum =

The plays of L. Frank Baum are an aspect of Baum's writing career about which very little is known. While most biographies have noted Baum's work as a playwright, these works have been rarely performed beyond his lifetime, and almost none have been published aside from two scenarios and a first act of three unfinished works in The Musical Fantasies of L. Frank Baum, compiled with an introduction by Alla T. Ford. Aside from his youthful success with The Maid of Arran, his blockbuster eight-year run with The Wizard of Oz, his failure with The Woggle-Bug, and The Tik-Tok Man of Oz as source material for his novel, Tik-Tok of Oz, very little is known about his dramatic output, and mostly from the publications of Michael Patrick Hearn, Susan Ferrara, and Katharine M. Rogers. Hearn identifies 41 different titles in the bibliography of the 2000 edition of The Annotated Wizard of Oz, plus one play without a title, although some of these titles clearly refer to drafts of the same play, such as the early titles of The Tik-Tok Man of Oz.

One of the most contentious works is The Whatnexters (1903). Michael Patrick Hearn listed it under the plays in The Annotated Wizard of Oz (2000). Katharine M. Rogers takes this citation and suggests that this is "one of Baum's little jokes" and that the play never actually existed. In fact, Hearn's source is The Story of the House of Witmark: From Ragtime to Swingtime, which refers to it as the "first chapter of an unfinished book" by Baum and Isidore Witmark. Rogers cites an article by Russel P. MacFall in the Winter 1982 issue of The Baum Bugle that exemplifies the estranged Frank Joslyn Baum not knowing what he is talking about. His biography of L. Frank Baum, To Please a Child was written after being estranged from his mother, and contains numerous made-up details.

== The early years: Louis F. Baum ==
Benjamin Ward Baum, a barrel maker turned oil investor, originally did not want his son taking up acting under the family name, so he adopted the pseudonym of George Brooks. Eventually, Benjamin Baum bought a theatre in Richburg, New York, calling it Baum's Opera House, and relaxed the idea of one of his own performing in them, thinking it might well represent the interest of the company by bankrolling his son's acting career. Never much for his first name, Lyman Frank Baum, who had been known as "Frank" for most of his childhood, chose the new pen name "Louis F. Baum." Most of these plays are known only from their copyrights. The Maid of Arran, based on a novel by William Black, went on a very successful tour with Baum in the lead. While most of Baum's later musical theatre works featured music by other composers, Baum himself composed the music for this piece, which is apparently the only musical of the group. Matches, a drawing room comedy, and Kilmourne are lost, but they are known to have been performed in repertory. The Mackrummins and The Queen of Killarney may never have actually been written—the latter is mentioned by Isidore Witmark and Isaac Goldberg in From Ragtime to Swingtime with a date of 1885; Witmark published the music to Baum's Oz plays. The theatre in burned to the ground a few months later. Matches was withdrawn after a performance at Brown's Opera House, also in Richburg, when a fire broke out behind the theatre. The Maid of Arran is known to survive in manuscript, as well as microform and microfiche copies of it, which can be found in many larger and academic libraries, and a selection of six of the eight songs published for consumer use survives and was reprinted in two parts in The Baum Bugle using a copy found at the University of Minnesota by Scott Andrew Hutchins and Ruth Berman, both of whom received credit.

- The Mackrummins (11 February 1882)
- The Maid of Arran: An Irish Idyl (11 February (opened 15 May) 1882)
- Matches (11 February (opened 18 May) 1882)
- Kilmourne, or O'Connor's Dream (opened 4 April 1883)
- The Queen of Killarney (1883)

== Musical extravaganzas ==
=== With Paul Tietjens ===
After the success of Baum's collection of children's poetry, Father Goose, His Book in 1898 and youth novel, The Wonderful Wizard of Oz, in 1900, Baum began collaborating on a series of musicals with composer Paul Tietjens. W.W. Denslow, illustrator of both these books, was reluctantly (according to Tietjens's diary) brought on as designer for The Wizard of Oz because he shared copyright, but was involved in neither King Midas nor The Octopus. None of these were produced save the culmination in The Wizard of Oz, which first appeared in Chicago in 1902 and at the Majestic Theatre (Columbus Circle) in New York City in 1903. It differed heavily from the original novel based on the dictates of director Julian Mitchell (with producer Fred R. Hamlin deferring to his wishes), who thought that Baum's close adaptation from 1901, which survives and was intended to be published as an appendix to To Please a Child (a Baum biography by Frank Joslyn Baum and Russell P. MacFall, known for being inaccurate), but was excluded due to copyright concerns, was "not good." The show's big song for the Scarecrow, "The Traveller and the Pie," which is included in both versions, is derived from an earlier Baum-Tietjens collaboration called The Octopus; or The Title Trust As with most plays subsequent to the Louis F. Baum period, Hearn marks these "unproduced and possibly never completed" because the existence of their manuscripts is unknown. Very little Baum material survives in The Wizard of Oz, which was predominantly written by a Mr. Finnegan and Glenn McDonough. Baum tried to prevent the show from opening, but Mitchell protested, and Hamlin refused to produce the show without Mitchell.

- King Midas (1901)
- The Octopus; or the Title Trust (1 May 1901)
- The Wonderful Wizard of Oz (18 September 1901)
- The Wizard of Oz (16 June 1902)

=== King Jonah XIII (September 1903) ===
This was to be a musical with composer Nathaniel D. Mann, who provided some songs for The Wizard of Oz such as "The Different Ways of Making Love," and the original film score for Baum's feature film/theatre hybrid, The Fairylogue and Radio-Plays (1908).

=== With Emerson Hough ===
Baum's work with fellow writer Emerson Hough were intended as musicals. The Maid of Athens and The King of Gee-Whiz exist in scenarios that were published in Alla T. Ford's The Musical Fantasies of L. Frank Baum (1958), although no music appears to exist for them. These plays reflect an earthier, bawdier sensibility than Baum's other work, his novels for adults included, presumably due to Hough's influence.

==== Montezuma or The Son of the Sun (November 1902) ====
Montezuma or The Son of the Sun, with music by Nathaniel D. Mann (some of which was actually composed), is based on an earlier spoken play by Hough that he brought to Baum to turn into a musical. It is based on the same play as The King of Gee-Whiz, below. Both of these scripts were completed and turned over to Elizabeth Marbury and are now held in a private collection. The lyrics of "Reckless Noah," from this play, appear in Father Goose's Year Book.

==== The Maid of Athens: A College Fantasy or Spartacus (1903) ====
The Maid of Athens is a comedy about a college student at "Illiana University" named Spartacus Smith who is informed that an heiress named —ora Jones from a town called Athens that he is advised to marry. At Illiana University, there happens to be a Dora Jones from Athens, Ohio, a Flora Jones from Athens, Georgia, and a Norah Jones from Athens, Texas, and Spartacus does not know which is the heiress he is to marry. Of these, he favours Dora, and after smoking excessive cigarettes, Spartacus dreams that he is in ancient Athens, Greece, where Dora is "Pulchra, the Maid of Athens," and he meets the ancient Spartacus working as a janitor at the High Temple, where he gives Spartacus Smith golden pills that will enable him to overcome all obstacles. Willie Sedgwick has become interested in Flora Jones and Napoleon Buck in Norah Jones, each hoping that his choice is the heiress. Spartacus is not aware of this until just before the big football game. Dora has promised to marry him if he helps the football team beat Homecoming rival Massajersey, so Spartacus uses the pills given to him by the historical Spartacus. Baum and Hough stated their intention to put an actual football game on stage "'for blood'" using real football players playing their best. In the end (no matter which side actually wins the game), Spartacus receives another letter from home identifying the heiress as Cora Jones, who is actually at Wellesley College, thus causing all to accept their chosen partners. The intended composer for this work is unknown.

==== The King of Gee-Whiz (1905) ====
This scenario was copyrighted 23 February 1905, and was intended to feature music by Paul Tietjens that was probably never composed. It deals with the arrival of the Lieutenant Arthur Wainwright, who falls like a projectile onto the Island of Gee-Whiz, where the residents are sun worshippers (in context, this seems to play on both literal and figurative meanings) and recognize their king, Goo-Goo, as Son of the Sun. Goo-Goo wants to procure precious metals from the High Priestess Princess Itla of Radiant Valley to build a doghouse, because precious metals are common and functional there, but mostly found only in Itla's part of the island, from which they are barred. Wainwright falls in love with Itla and kisses her, and this punishment deems him worthy of sacrifice. When Goo-Goo learns that Wainwright can blow bubbles, he is proclaimed Lord High Entertainer to the King as long as he can still blow bubbles, which means he is to die when the soap is gone. Sir Isaac Morgenstern, a retired soap maker, arrives on the island attempting to conquer it for the British Empire, along with a missionary named Willie Cook and various others. This complicates many of the island's problems and leads them to see the Oracle, who advises them to make soap from the missionary and a Marie Corelli novel Wainwright had with him. Despite the missionary's death, there is now so much soap that Goo-Goo loses interest and wants Wainwright sacrificed. Itla absconds with Wainwright to the Radiant Valley, where Morgenstern and Goo-Goo are struck by lightning enough times to gain sense, and couples are formed from many characters in the play, while the missionary emerges alive and identifies himself as Sherlock Holmes, and an Incan widow and children to be his family. True love restores the splendor of the Radiant Valley. As with Montezuma, based on the same spoken play, the script was turned over to Elizabeth Marbury and is now held in a private collection, although, unlike Montezuma, the scenario has been published.

== Other collaborations ==
=== Prince Silverwings (1903) ===
Baum worked with Edith Ogden Harrison on developing her children's book, Prince Silverwings into a musical extravaganza. The project went off and on, and Baum composed a song for it called "Down Among the Marshes," but the project eventually fell apart. The scenario and general synopsis was eventually published in 1981. A completed draft of the script exists, but remains unpublished.

=== More collaborations with Tietjens ===
==== Father Goose (August 1904) ====
Father Goose was another intended collaboration with Paul Tietjens. It is not known how close to the original book of nonsense verse this material would be based, or if a new narrative was to be developed in full.

=== The Woggle-Bug (February 1905) ===
The Woggle-Bug is an adaptation of Baum's The Marvelous Land of Oz, intended as a sequel to The Wizard of Oz musical. Montgomery and Stone refused to reprise their roles as the Tin Woodman and Scarecrow, respectively, in an untested work, and so those characters were removed, with the play written with the role of the Woggle-Bug expanded from the novel and elevated into a comic partnership with Jack Pumpkinhead. The score by Frederic Chapin was admired, but the play in full was derided as more of a knockoff than a sequel to The Wizard of Oz, and it played only two cities, Chicago and Milwaukee, before it closed, without ever reaching Broadway.

== Other plays ==
=== Unfinished, untitled play set in Egypt (January 1906) ===
This play was a project upon which Baum wanted to embark after returning home from Egypt with his wife, Maud Gage Baum. Maud produced the memoir, In Other Lands Than Ours for which Frank provided photographs and an introduction, and Frank also wrote The Boy Fortune Hunters in Egypt, but this project may never have gone past talk.

=== Mortal for an Hour or The Fairy Prince or Prince Marvel (1909) ===
This play, very loosely based on an element of Baum's novel, The Enchanted Island of Yew, was first published under the second of these titles in Entertaining. Under the title, Prince Marvel, it was published in L. Frank Baum's Juvenile Speaker.

=== The Pipes O' Pan (31 March 1909) ===
The Pipes O' Pan is based on the Greek myth of King Midas judging a music contest between Apollo and Pan and preferring the latter. Baum wrote a first act that remains unpublished. A second version of the first act was written with George Scarborough and was intended to feature music by Paul Tietjens, although subsequent acts were never completed. This was first published in Alla T. Ford's The Musical Fantasies of L. Frank Baum (1958), and has also been published online. This may or may not be related to the earlier Baum/Tietjens King Midas project.

=== Peter and Paul (1909) ===
This work was described by Baum as an "opera" (although he seemed to use the terms "play," "musical," and "opera" interchangeably—existing recordings of the two singers are far removed from classical singing) with music by Arthur Pryor. It was to feature Montgomery and Stone in nine different roles apiece in nine different historical periods. No script or music has been found, but neither Baum nor Pryor scholars have put forth the opinion as to the work never having existed.

=== The Girl from Oz or The Girl of Tomorrow (1909) ===
This was later adapted for radio by Frank Joslyn Baum. In spite of the title, the story is unrelated to the Land of Oz.

=== The Clock Shop (1910) ===
Little is known of this work save the title.

=== The Pea-Green Poodle (1910) ===
Based on the eponymous short story from Animal Fairy Tales.

== Prelude to The Oz Film Manufacturing Company with Louis F. Gottschalk ==
These plays were written in collaboration with composer Louis F. Gottschalk. The Tik-Tok Man of Oz was the only one produced, after being worked through several collaborations with Manuel Klein under the titles, Ozma of Oz (it was loosely based on that novel) and The Rainbow's Daughter, Or The Magnet of Love. Oliver Morosco picked it up and added three songs of his own, written with composer Victor Schertzinger. Although the play toured for over a year, Morosco didn't think it was profitable enough to take to Broadway, closed the show, and started working as a film producer. Baum and Gottschalk then formed The Oz Film Manufacturing Company with members of The Uplifters, and the two other scripts, based on Baum's novels, The Patchwork Girl of Oz and Queen Zixi of Ix, Or, The Story of the Magic Cloak, became drafts for the films, The Patchwork Girl of Oz and The Magic Cloak of Oz.

- The Tik-Tok Man of Oz (31 March 1913)
- The Patchwork Girl of Oz (16 November 1913)
- King Bud of Noland, or The Magic Cloak (1913)

== Plays for The Uplifters ==
- Stagecraft, or, The Adventures of a Strictly Moral Man (14 January 1914)
- High Jinks (24 October 1914)
- The Corrugated Giant (1915)
- The Uplift of Lucifer, or Raising Hell: An Allegorical Squazosh (23 October 1915)
- The Birth of the New Year (31 December 1915)
- Blackbird Cottages: The Uplifter's Minstrels (28 October 1916), a blackface minstrel show.
- Snow White (1916)
- The Orpheus Road Show: A Paraphrastic Compendium of Mirth (1917)
