= Barney =

Barney may refer to:

== People and fictional characters ==
- Barney (given name), a list of people and fictional characters
- Barney (surname), a list of people

== Film and television ==
- Barney (film), a 1976 Australian film for children
- Barney (British TV series), a BBC children's television programme
- Barney (franchise), American children's media franchise
  - Barney the Dinosaur, the eponymous character of the franchise

== Places ==
=== United States ===
- Barney, Arkansas, an unincorporated community
- Barney, Georgia, an unincorporated community
- Barney, Iowa, an unincorporated community
- Barney, North Dakota, a city
- Barney Creek (Lorain County, Ohio)

=== Elsewhere ===
- Barney, Norfolk, an English village
- Mount Barney (Queensland), Queensland, Australia
- Barney Island, in the Torres Strait between Australia and New Guinea; see List of Torres Strait Islands
- 5655 Barney, an asteroid

== Other uses ==
- Barney (dog), a pet of former U.S. President George W. Bush
- USS Barney, two destroyers and a torpedo boat

== See also ==
- Barny
- Barnie, a nickname and a surname
- Barni (disambiguation)
