= Father Goose's Year Book =

1907 book by L. Frank Baum

- First edition
- Author: L. Frank Baum
- Illustrator: Walter J. Enright
- Language: English
- Genre: Humor, Poetry
- Publisher: Reilly & Britton
- Publication date: 1907
- Publication place: United States
- Media type: Print (hardcover)
- Pages: 128 pp.

Father Goose's Year Book: Quaint Quacks and Feathered Shafts for Mature Children is a collection of humorous nonsense poetry written by L. Frank Baum, author of the Oz books. It was published in 1907.

The book was illustrated by Walter J. Enright; he was the husband of Maginel Wright Enright, the artist who illustrated Baum's The Twinkle Tales (1906), Policeman Bluejay (1907), and L. Frank Baum's Juvenile Speaker (1910).

As its title indicates, Father Goose's Year Book was an attempt to capitalize on the prior success of Father Goose: His Book, the 1899 collaboration between Baum and W. W. Denslow that was the dominant best-seller in children's literature at the turn of the twentieth century. Baum had made similar attempts, with uneven results; The Songs of Father Goose (1900) had been a respectable seller, but other ventures, including a Father Goose Calendar, failed to materialize. The Year Book was a belated version of the calendar: it was a date book with humorous poems and pictures on the left (the verso side of each leaf), faced with blank pages on the right (the recto side) for making notes.

Baum's poems for the collection are similar to his verses in the original Father Goose, but aimed at adults (the "mature children" of the subtitle). The Year Book was described as "the first book for grown-ups by the author of The Wizard of Oz, Ozma of Oz, etc." Unfortunately, Baum's rhymes in the Year Book are tainted with the racial and ethnic prejudices and stereotypes of his era; indeed, it is this aspect of the book that is most striking to a modern sensibility.
