= Barni (disambiguation) =

Barni is a commune in Como, Lombary, Italy. Barni may also refer to:

- Barni (name)
- Barni dates
- Barni, Himachal Pradesh, a village in India

== See also ==
- Barny
- Barney
