= Barney Cohen =

Barney Cohen may refer to:

- Barney Cohen (screenwriter), writer on Forever Knight, Friday the 13th: The Final Chapter, Killer Party and Doom Runners; In the 80's, He was hired by his friend Joseph Zito to re-write Ted Newsom & John Brancato's first draft for Spider-Man and he was an executive consultant on Sabrina, the Teenage Witch.
- Barney Cohen (businessman), founder of Valley Media, Inc. and record label Valley Entertainment

== See also ==
- Barney (disambiguation)
- Cohen (disambiguation)
