= Barney (given name) =

Barney is a masculine given name. It is often short for Barnard, Barnett, and other names. It is also derived from the Slavic name Barni, the pet form of Barnim, which means "defender", and it was formerly a popular name throughout Pomerania. Notable people with the name include:

== People ==
=== Given name ===
- Barney Aaron (1800–1859), English-born American bare-knuckle boxer
- Young Barney Aaron (1836–1907), English-born American bare-knuckle boxer; son of Barney Aaron
- Barney Barnato (1851–1897), British mining entrepreneur active in South Africa
- Barney Clark (died 1983), first human recipient of an artificial heart
- Barney Corse (1799–1878), American abolitionist
- Barney Frank (1940–2026), American politician
- Barney M. Giles (1892–1984), US Army Air Force lieutenant general
- Barney F. Hajiro (1916–2011), US Army soldier awarded the Medal of Honor
- Barney Hill (1922–1969), an American who, with his wife, claimed to have been kidnapped by aliens
- Barney Kessel (1923–2004), American jazz guitarist
- Barney Lebrowitz (1891–1949), better known as "Battling Levinsky", American boxer
- Barney Martin (1923–2005), American actor
- Barney McCosky (1917–1996), Major League Baseball outfielder
- Barney Pelty (1880–1939), American Major League Baseball player
- Barney Poole (1923–2005), National Football League player
- Barney Ross (1909–1967), American boxer born Dov-Ber Rasofsky
- Barney Sedran (1891–1964), American basketball player
- Barney Stewart (born 2004), Scottish footballer
- Barney Visser (born 1949), NASCAR team owner
- Barney E. Warren (1867–1951), American Christian hymnwriter and minister

=== Hypocorism ===
- Barney Berlinger (1908–2002), American decathlete
- Barney Carr (Gaelic footballer) (1923–2021), Irish Gaelic football player and manager
- Barney Danson (1921–2011), Canadian politician and cabinet minister
- Barney Dreyfuss (1865–1932), owner of the Pittsburgh Pirates baseball team
- Barney Harwood (born 1979), British actor and television presenter
- Barney Herbert (1889–1949), Australian rules footballer
- Barney Hudson (1906–1971), English rugby union and rugby league footballer
- Barney McKenna (1939–2012), Irish musician and a founding member of The Dubliners
- Barney Oldfield (1878–1946), American automobile racer and pioneer
- Barney Rosset (1922–2012), owner of Grove Press, and publisher and Editor-in-Chief of the magazine Evergreen Review
- Barney Wilen (1937–1996), French saxophonist

=== Nickname ===
- Barney Baker, American mobster
- Barney Bigard (1906–1980), American jazz clarinetist and tenor saxophonist
- Barney Carr (1897–1971), Australian rules footballer
- Barney Greenway (born 1969), British metal singer
- Barney Roos (1888–1960), American automotive engineer, co-designer of the Willys MB Jeep
- Raymond van Barneveld (born 1967), Dutch professional darts player

== Fictional characters ==
- Barney the Dinosaur, title character of Barney & Friends
- Barney Barton, older brother and arch-enemy of the superhero Hawkeye in the Marvel Comics universe
- Barney Bear, the title character of the 1939–1954 animated shorts Barney Bear
- Barney Calhoun, a playable character in Half-Life: Blue Shift and a major character in the Half-Life 2 series
- Barney Collier, from the original Mission: Impossible TV series, and the 1988 revival, portrayed by Greg Morris
- Barney Fife, from The Andy Griffith Show
- Barney Google, a comic strip character in Barney Google and Snuffy Smith
- Barney Gumble, from The Simpsons
- Barney Miller, a police captain in the TV show Barney Miller
- Barney Ross, the leader of The Expendables
- Barney Rubble, from The Flintstones
- Barney Stinson, from the CBS television series How I Met Your Mother, portrayed by Neil Patrick Harris
- Barney, a sheepdog in the short-lived British animated children's TV series Barney

== See also ==
- Barnie Boonzaaier (born 1992), South African rugby union player
