= Barnie =

- Gender: both

Other names
- See also: Barney, Barnier, Barny

Barnie is a surname and nickname. Notable people with the name include:

- Billy Barnie (1853–1900), American Major League Baseball manager and catcher
- John Barnhill (American football) (1903–1973), American college football player, coach and athletics administrator
- Abraham Barnie Boonzaaier (born 1992), South African rugby union player

== See also ==
- Barney (disambiguation)
- Barnier
