= Barney (surname) =

Barney is a surname. Notable people with the surname include:

- Albert B. Barney (1835–1910), American politician
- Albert W. Barney Jr. (1920–2010), American lawyer and Chief Justice of the Vermont Supreme Court
- Alice Pike Barney (1857–1931), American painter
- Bob Barney (born 1932), professor and Olympic scholar
- Charles D. Barney (1844–1945), American stockbroker, founder of Charles D. Barney & Co
- Darwin Barney (born 1985), American baseball player
- Dave Barney (born 1932), American educator and swimming coach
- George Barney (1792–1862), Royal Engineers officer and Lieutenant Governor of the Colony of North Australia
- Gerald O. Barney (1937–2020), American physicist
- Gerry Barney (born 1939), British designer
- Jacory Barney Jr., American football player
- John Barney (1785–1857), U.S. Congressman from Maryland
- Joseph Barney (1753–1832), English painter
- Joseph Nicholson Barney (1818–1899), Confederate Navy officer during the American Civil War, grandson of Joshua
- Joshua Barney (1759–1818), US Navy commodore during the Revolutionary War
- Keith Barney (born 1979), American guitarist of the American metalcore band Eighteen Visions
- Lem Barney (born 1945), American football player
- Maginel Wright Enright Barney (1881–1966), American children's book illustrator
- Matthew Barney (born 1967), American sculptor and film artist
- Matthew Barney (boxer) (born 1974), British boxer
- Natalie Clifford Barney (1876–1972), American playwright, poet and novelist
- Rex Barney (1924–1997), American baseball player
- Scott Barney (born 1979), Canadian ice hockey player
- Susan Hammond Barney (1834–1922), American evangelist, writer
- Tina Barney (born 1945), American photographer
