= Barny =

Barny is a given name and a surname. Notable people with the name include:

== Given name ==
- Barny Boatman (born 1956), English poker player

== Surname ==
- Junes Barny (born 1989), Swedish football player
- Bernard Barny de Romanet (1894–1921), French World War I flying ace
- Pedro Barny (born 1966), Portuguese football defender and manager

== See also ==
- Barny Cakes – UK cake brand
- Barney (disambiguation)
- Barni (disambiguation)
