= Fanny Cory =

American illustrator and comic strip creator (1877–1972)

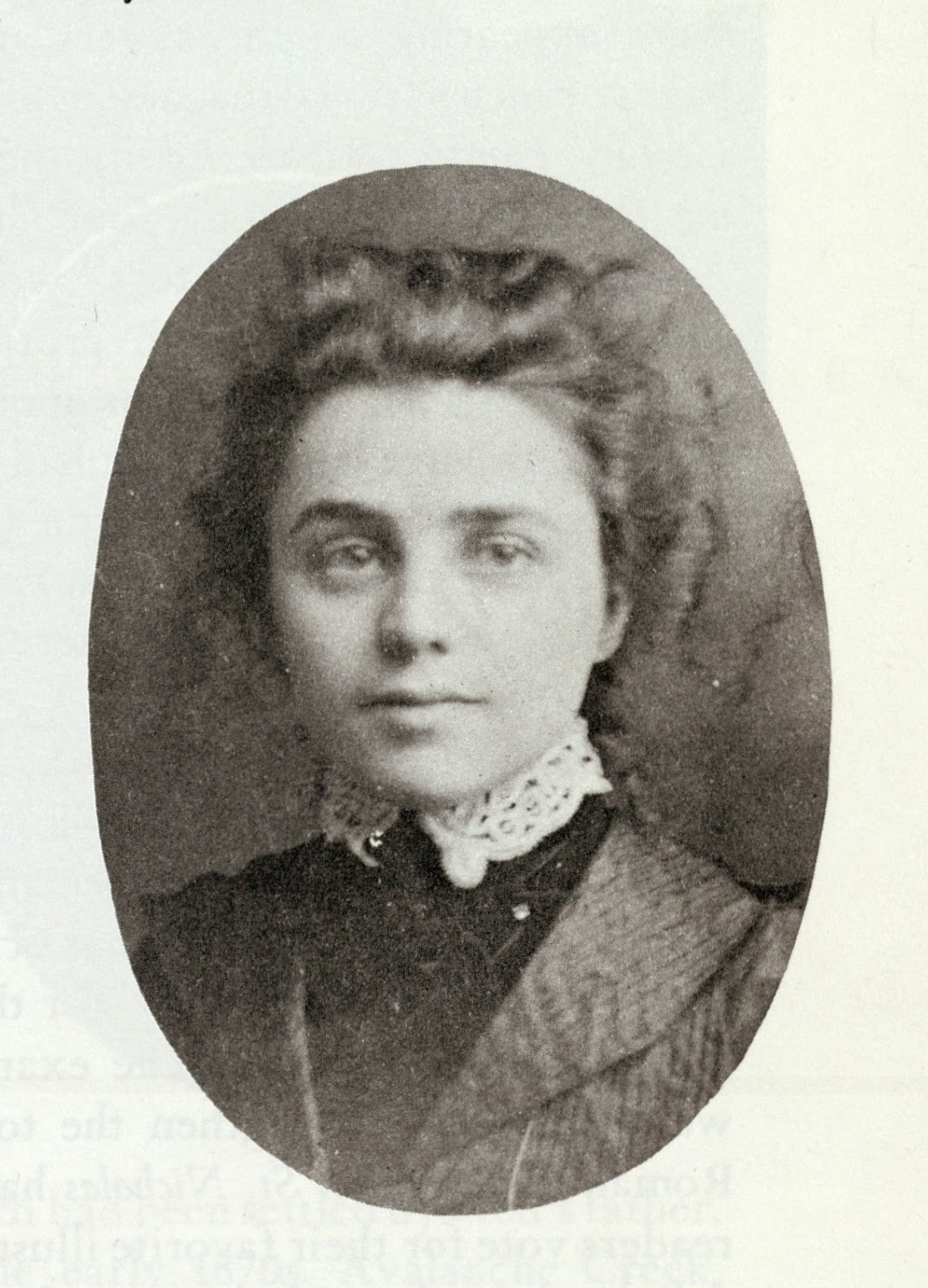
- Born: October 18, 1877 Waukegan, Illinois
- Died: July 28, 1972 (aged 94) Stanwood, Washington
- Areas: Cartoonist, illustrator
- Pseudonyms: F. Y. Cory, F. Cory Cooney, Fanny Cory Cooney, Fanny Y. Cory, FYC
- Notable works: Sonnysayings (c. 1920–1956); Little Miss Muffet (1935–1956)
- Spouse: Fred W. Cooney (m. 1904)
- Children: Sayre, Robert, Ted

Fanny Young Cory (October 17, 1877 – July 28, 1972) was a cartoonist and book illustrator best known for her comic strips Sonnysayings and Little Miss Muffet. Cory was one of America's first female syndicated cartoonists.

She went by several pen names: F. Y. Cory, F. Cory Cooney and Fanny Cory Cooney but eventually used Fanny Y. Cory as her professional name. She sometimes used FYC as a signature on her early work.

== Early life and education ==
Fanny Young Cory was born in Waukegan, Illinois, on October 17, 1877, the daughter of Benjamin Sayre Cory and Jessy Salter McDougall. As a child, she drew or sketched on anything she could find. When Cory was ten years old, her mother died of tuberculosis. Two years later, Cory's father moved the family to Helena, Montana.

Cory was 14 when she began to study under artist Mary C. Wheeler, the art supervisor of the Helena school system. In 1894, her older brother Jack and his wife Bertha invited her to stay in New York with them. Two years later, Cory enrolled at the Metropolitan School of Fine Arts. The following year, she was accepted by the Art Students League. Although Cory was a top student, the family had little money to spare for her education. In addition, Cory wanted to help care for her sister Agnes, who had tuberculosis. So, Cory left school.

== Illustration career ==
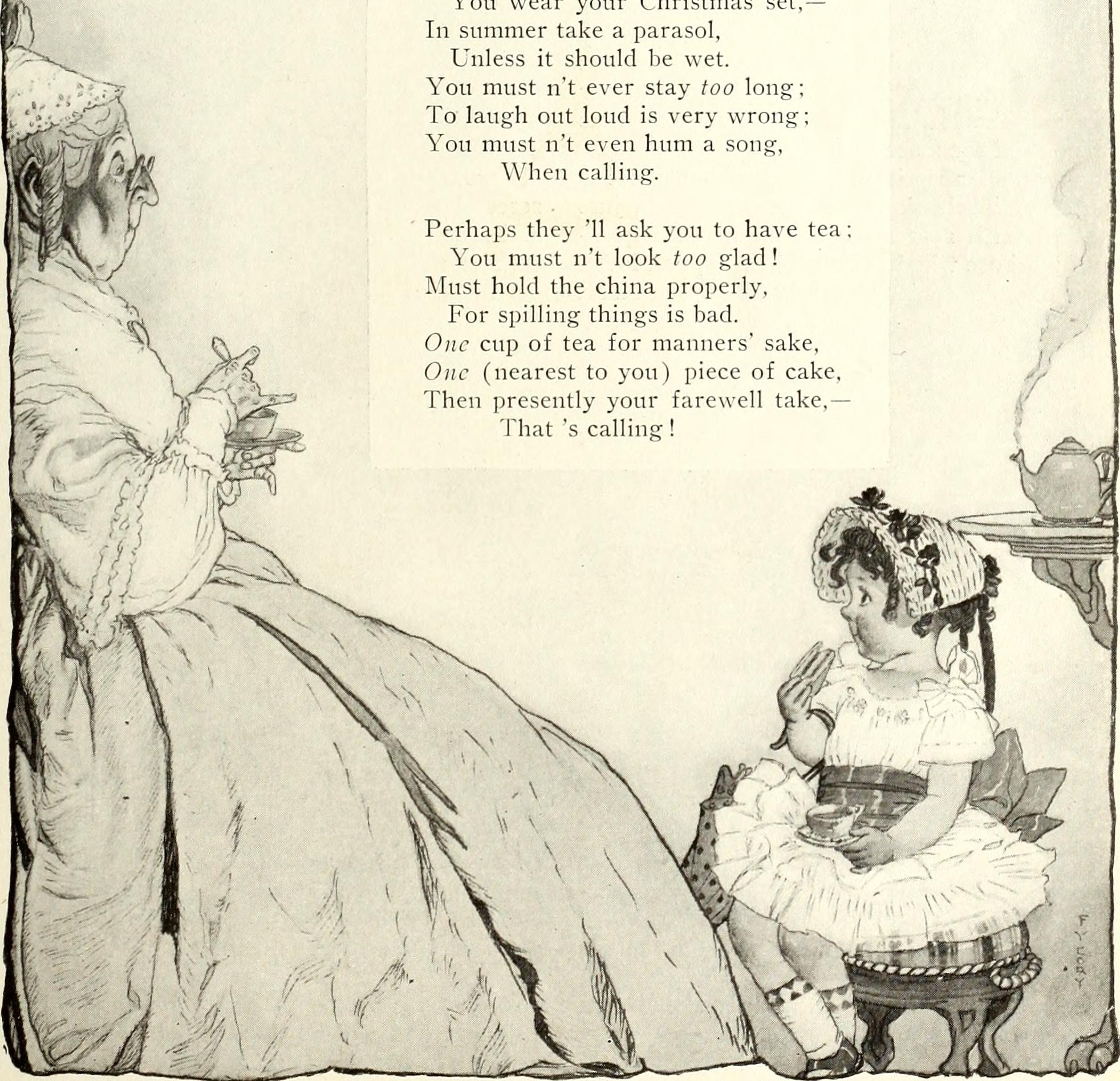
Cory illustrated this poem for St. Nicholas in 1915.

Wanting to support herself and her ailing sister Agnes, Cory began selling her drawings. She made her first sale in 1898 to The Century Magazine. As her career blossomed, Cory did covers and interior illustrations for magazines including Century, Harper's Bazaar, Life, Scribner's, The Saturday Evening Post and St. Nicholas.

Cory illustrated numerous books including a 1902 edition of Alice's Adventures in Wonderland and Through the Looking Glass by Lewis Carroll. She illustrated L. Frank Baum's books The Master Key and The Enchanted Island of Yew. She illustrated Marion Hill's The Pettison Twins (McClure, Phillips & Co, 1906). Cory illustrated William L. Hill's Jackieboy in Rainbowland (Rand McNally & Company, 1911). Between 1913 and 1926, Cory decided to focus on raising her children, and she put her career on hold.

To relax, Cory began painting whimsical watercolors of fairies, flowers, birds, and other small animals. She made one for each letter of the alphabet, each one accompanied by a poem. She called them her "Fairy Alphabet." Cory considered these paintings her finest work, although she said she had no plans for them. The Montana Historical Society museum exhibited the paintings in the 1950s, but it was not until the 1980s that The Fairy Alphabet was published. The book was re-released by Riverbend Publishing in 2011.

== Comic strips ==
Cory's first attempt at cartooning, Ben Bolt, or, The Kid You Were Yourself, flopped. But in the 1920s, needing money to send her children to college, Cory decided to try again. She began producing a single-panel cartoon called Other People's Children.

In 1926, Cory began her favorite comic, Sonnysayings, distributed by the Ledger Syndicate. It featured a precocious 5-year-old boy and his view of the world. Sonnysayings appeared in many newspapers throughout the United States, Canada, Australia, and Scotland, under the name of Fanny Y. Cory. By 1935, Sonnnysayings had moved to King Features, where it ran until Cory's retirement in 1956. The cartoon was so popular that E. P. Dutton released a book collection in 1929.

In 1935, Cory launched Little Miss Muffet, syndicated by King Features until June 30, 1956. Designed to compete with Little Orphan Annie, the cartoon featured the adventures of orphan Milly Muffet and her dog. (Little Miss Muffet was written by Tecla Scheuring from 1940 to 1946.) A Little Miss Muffet comic book was published in 1948 and 1949 by Best Books.

== Personal life ==
Cory returned to Montana in 1902 after the death of her sister Agnes. Her brothers, Jack and Bob, wanted to try their luck at gold mining, and they invited their sister to join them. The siblings had three cabins built northeast of Helena, not far from the mine. Cory called hers a "studio."

In 1904, Cory married Fred Cooney and moved to his ranch on the Missouri River near the community of Canyon Ferry. She embraced ranch life, creating her illustrations with her drawing board in her lap as she sat by the window in the living room of the ranch house. She planted large gardens, canned the produce, and decorated her canning labels with illustrations. The couple had 3 children: Sayre, Robert, and Ted. In 1951, Cory was named Montana Mother of the Year. Cory retired in 1956. She moved to the Puget Sound area to be near her daughter, Sayre. She died in 1972 in Stanwood, Washington.

Her brother J. Campbell Cory also became a cartoonist. Fanny Cory was related to Kate Cory, particularly noted for her photographs and paintings of the Hopi.
