= Barnier =

Barnier is a surname, and may refer to:

- Gordon Barnier (1928–2000), Australian politician
- Michel Barnier (born 1951), conservative French politician
- Romain Barnier (born 1976), French freestyle swimmer

== See also ==
- Barnie
- Bernier
