= Little Beaver Creek (Lorain County, Ohio) =

Coordinates: 41°25′32″N 82°13′43″W

Little Beaver Creek is a tributary of Beaver Creek (a.k.a. "Big Beaver Creek") in Lorain County, Ohio. Little Beaver Creek begins north of the Lorain County Regional Airport and runs northerly until the Little Beaver joins with the Big Beaver in the present city-limits of Lorain, Ohio. (There is a smaller tributary of the Little Beaver which begins near the bygone village of "Whiskeyville".)

== See also ==
- Barney Creek, possibly the same or connected creek
