= Barni (name) =

Barni is a popular surname for the people of Baran or Bulandshahar who adopted Islam during Delhi Sultanate rule. They are found in India and Pakistan. Variations of name in English include Burney, Barani, etc.

Given name

- Barni Ahmed Qaasim, Somali multimedia artist and filmmaker

Surname

- Abha Barni (1874–1938), Princess of Siam, daughter of Gagananga Yukala
- Rambai Barni (1904–1984), Queen of Siam, daughter of Abha
- Roy Barni (1927–1957), American football defensive back
