= Policeman Bluejay =

1907 novel by L. Frank Baum

- First edition
- Author: L. Frank Baum (as "Laura Bancroft")
- Illustrator: Maginel Wright Enright
- Language: English
- Series: The Twinkle Tales
- Genre: Fantasy
- Publisher: Reilly & Britton
- Publication date: 1907
- Publication place: United States
- Media type: Print (hardcover)

Policeman Bluejay or Babes in Birdland is a children's novel written by L. Frank Baum and illustrated by Maginel Wright Enright. First published in 1907, Jack Snow considered it one of the best of Baum's works.

== The Book ==
In 1906 Baum wrote, and his publisher Reilly & Britton published, a set of six tales for young children, called The Twinkle Tales after their little-girl protagonist. The six were issued in separate chapbooks, but later collected into a volume titled Twinkle and Chubbins: Their Astonishing Adventures in Nature-Fairyland. The series was a hit; Reilly & Britton sold 40,000 copies of the little books in a short time. Such commercial success justified a sequel: Baum took his Policeman Bluejay character from the Twinkle Tale "Bandit Jim Crow" and cast him in a separate novel, to be issued the following year.

Baum published many works – adventure stories, melodramas, and juvenile novels — under pseudonyms; early experience had taught him that he ended up "competing with himself" if he released too much material under his own name. Both The Twinkle Tales and Policeman Bluejay were printed under the pen name "Laura Bancroft" — the only Baum fantasy works published under a pseudonym. Tongue-in-cheek, Katharine Rogers has called Policeman Bluejay "her best work...." Oz author and "Royal Historian" Jack Snow thought Policeman Bluejay Baum's finest fantasy apart from the Oz books.

Policeman Bluejay was another success for Baum and his publishers; a second edition appeared in 1911, under the alternative title Babes in Birdland. The third edition of 1917, also under the new title, dropped the pseudonym and acknowledged Baum's authorship. The book was issued in a facsimile edition in 1981, and was printed again in the second issue of the annual Oz-story Magazine in 1996. A volume that combined all the "Bancroft" material appeared in 2005.

== The illustrations ==
Maginel Wright Enright was in her mid-twenties, and still near the start of her artistic career, when she created the illustrations for The Twinkle Tales and Policeman Bluejay. Her pictures for the "Bancroft" books have been described as having "a child-like grace, a clear clean outline, and a sometimes highly refined decorative sense."

== The theme ==
The "Bancroft" works of 1906 and 1907 are united by a general concept: kindness to animals rather than cruelty. Baum recalled from his own childhood, and observed in his own sons, how harsh children can be to vulnerable animals. Baum wrote a preface to Policeman Bluejay that expressed this goal unambiguously; he noted that along with the "amusement" the story provides, he hoped it would inspire "a little tenderness for the helpless animals and birds" his young readers encountered in their lives.

This goal motivated the most extreme element in Policeman Bluejay — the hunting scene in Chapter IX, "The Destroyers," an extraordinarily violent scene in a story designed for young children.

== Synopsis ==
At the story's start, Twinkle and Chubbins are lost in a "great forest." They encounter a "tuxix" — a creature that looks like a spiny turtle, but is in reality "a magician, a sorcerer, a wizard, and a witch all rolled into one...and you can imagine what a dreadful thing that would be." The evil tuxix casts a spell on the children, transforming them into little bird-like beings, with their own heads but the bodies of skylarks. (They resemble the human-headed, bird-bodied sirins, alkonosts, and gamayuns of Russian folklore.) Policeman Bluejay, the force of order in the avian world of the forest, leads the two child-larks on a flight through the sky; he esconces them in an abandoned thrush's nest in a maple tree, and with the help of a friendly eagle he retrieves their picnic basket (so that they don't have to eat bugs, worms, and grubs).

Twinkle and Chubbins learn of their new maple-tree neighbors, a squirrel, an owl, and an o'possum; and Policeman Bluejay introduces them to the community of birds. The children see that the world of living beings in the forest has structure, relationships, and conflict. They hear stories of human cruelty to animals – and soon they witness it firsthand, when hunters enter the forest. The hunters kill Mrs. 'Possum and Mrs. Hootaway and Wisk the squirrel; Twinkle tries to protest, but she can only make a skylark's chirp. The hunters' dog almost catches Twinkle – but she and Chubbins are rescued by their friend the eagle, who swoops down, kills the dog, and leads them to safety.

Or relative safety, at least: the eagle takes the two lark-children up to his eyrie, where his hungry hatchlings want to eat them for breakfast. (Baum acknowledges that animals, to survive, have to prey upon each other. Yet he maintains that "love" is the Grand Law of the forest.) Policeman Bluejay escorts the children to a safer location. Soon he takes them to the Paradise of Birds, where the contentions and violence of the forest never penetrate. The children are given a tour of its splendors, and meet the King Bird of Paradise. In the "suburbs" of Paradise, the child-larks are introduced to the community of bees, and meet the Queen Bee; and they witness a spectacular flight of butterflies.

Beyond Paradise, in "the coarse, outer world," there is trouble in birdland; Policeman Bluejay must cope with a rebellion among the rooks, who would make the other birds their slaves. By uniting, the smaller birds beat the rooks in a battle. The King Bird of Paradise and his Royal Necromancer have told the children that they can restore themselves to human form by eating a fruit called "tingle-berries." They do so, and return to their normal bodies – though Chubbins almost gets stuck halfway. Their adventure done, the children make their way home in the waning light of evening.

== The Paradise of Birds ==
Baum enriches the text of Policeman Bluejay with realistic details of the natural world. Yet Baum was not a naturalist but a fantasist, and the seven chapters (XII – XVIII) that he devotes to the Paradise of Birds are the heart of the fantasy. The author restricts himself to a simple language for his young audience; yet within this simplicity he paints a lush, lustrous, luxuriant prose poem of imaginative effects.

Policeman Bluejay delivers his young charges to the Guardian of the Entrance to Paradise (the Jay himself is too deeply tainted by the outer world to enter). The Guardian accepts them and turns them over to Ephel, the Royal Messenger, who guides them on their tour. Ephel brings them to the royal court of the King Bird of Paradise; the King's lecture on the virtue of vanity is the comic high point of the book. Ephel shows the children the Lustrous Lake with its singing fish, the curious lake of dry water, and the Gleaming Glade where the birds perform their Beauty Dance.

There is a clue that the Paradise of Birds is in fact Eden: "There is a legend that man once lived there, but for some unknown crime was driven away. But the birds have always been allowed to inhabit the place because they did no harm." Since these are "fairy Birds of Paradise," they occupy their own domain of reality; the reader does not need to picture actual birds-of-paradise in an actual American woodland. (Baum's combination of Eden with fairyland raises interesting complexities.)

Baum exploits concepts and images that are used by fantasists before and after him; readers familiar with the genre will perceive echoes of other works. The Paradise of Birds has trees "not made of wood, but having trunks of polished gold and silver and leaves of exquisite metallic colorings" — reminiscent of the gold and silver foliage in The Twelve Dancing Princesses. The barrier of wind that prevents entrance to the Paradise foreshadows the similar barrier in Lord Dunsany's The King of Elfland's Daughter. And the flowers with human faces in Chapter XV have a range of parallels.

== The form ==
Baum's Policeman Bluejay partakes of a deep tradition in literature and storytelling, folklore and myth, which employs the animal world, especially birds and bees, as metaphor for the human condition. Chaucer's The Parliament of Fowls is probably the best-known work in this vein, though various others can be cited, most commonly involving birds, and in Indian, Persian, and Arabic literature as well as Western. The trope re-appears in twentieth-century poetry, and in the early twenty-first it is still used to reach and teach young children.

In regard to bees, John Day's play The Parliament of Bees is arguably the most famous of a number of related works. (One major distinction applies: writers like Chaucer and Day were primarily interested in commenting on human society, and used their animal metaphors as means to that end. In Baum's book, the animals and their welfare are the central consideration.)

More generally, talking animals and human/animal transformation are virtually universal in world folklore. Baum's animal fable participates in this ancient tradition.
