= Maginel Wright Enright =

American writer & illustrator (1877–1966)

Maginel Wright Enright Barney (June 19, 1877 – April 18, 1966) was an American children's book illustrator and graphic artist. She was the younger sister of Frank Lloyd Wright, architect, and the mother of Elizabeth Enright, children's book writer and illustrator.

== Life ==
Wright Enright was born Margaret Ellen Wright in Weymouth, Massachusetts, the third child of William and Anna Wright. The name "Maginel" was a later creation of her mother's, a contraction of "Maggie Nell". At age two the family moved to Madison, Wisconsin. Ten years later they moved to Chicago, to be closer to Frank's architectural work, where she eventually attended the Chicago Art Institute. Her first job as a commercial artist was with the Barnes, Crosby Co. of Chicago, where her main task was catalog illustration. There she met Walter J. "Pat" Enright, another young artist, whom she married. (Note: Frank Lloyd Wright left a mordant account of his sister's wedding. The groom's mother fainted, the bride's father wept — and so did the minister, who was the bride's and Wright's Uncle Jenkin. The newly married Enrights went to visit the bride's mother's family in Wisconsin, a visit that provided the title to Wright Enright's late memoir, The Valley of the God-Almighty Joneses.)

Wright Enright gave birth to their daughter Elizabeth on September 17, 1907, in Oak Park, Illinois.

The Enrights moved to New York City for their careers and enjoyed an active social life there. After their divorce, Wright Enright married Hiram Barney, a lawyer who died in 1925.

Wright Enright's autobiography, The Valley of the God-Almighty Joneses, was published in 1965, one year before her death in East Hampton, New York.

== Book illustration ==
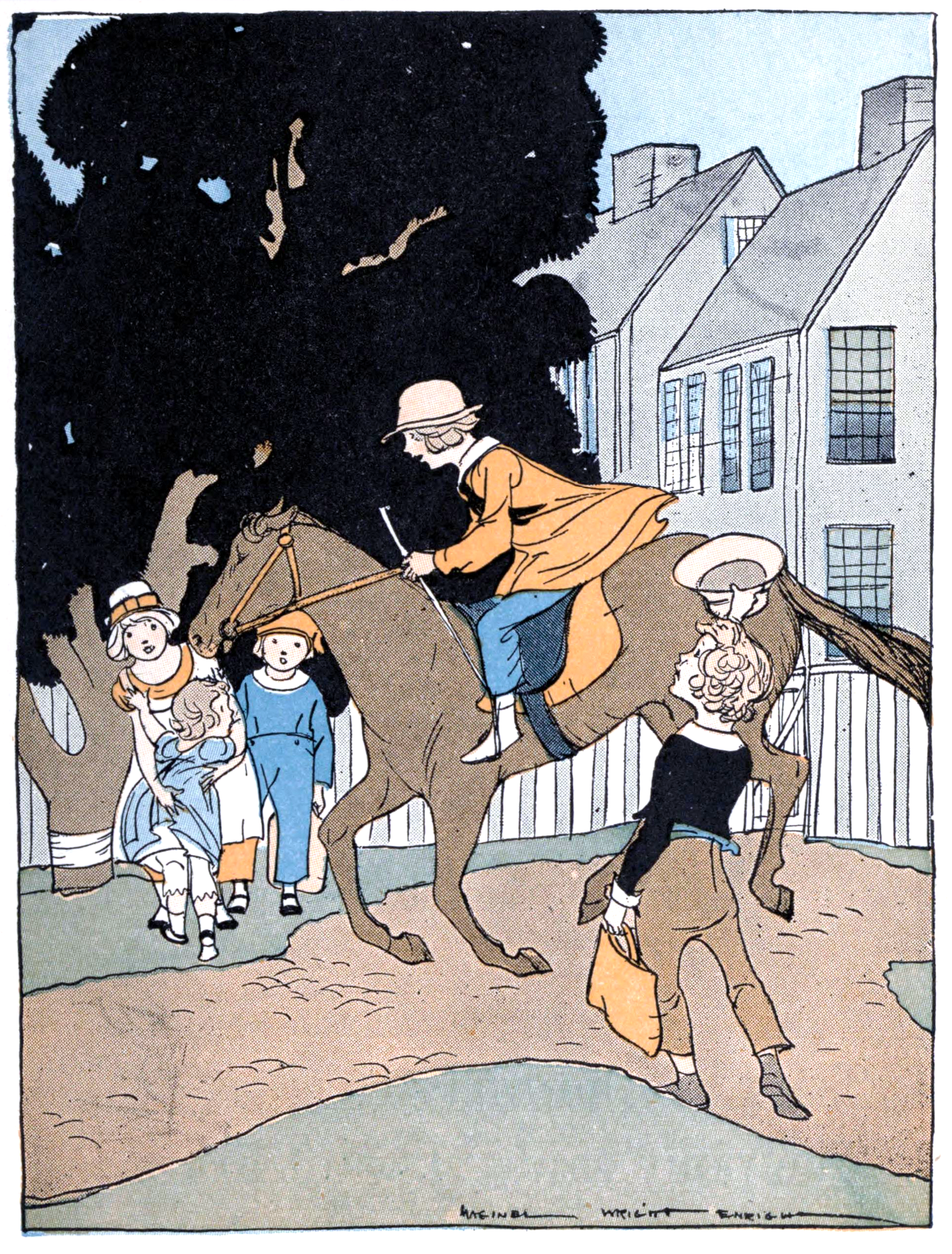
"Billy Boy had a pony" by Wright Enright, from a school primer published in 1922

It was under the name of Maginel Wright Enright that she conducted her professional career. She illustrated 63 children's books during her lifetime, sometimes working alone and sometimes with other artists. Her first job as a book illustrator was on The Twinkle Tales, a set of six booklets for young children published by Reilly & Britton in 1906, and written by L. Frank Baum under the pseudonym "Laura Bancroft." The books were successful, selling 40,000 copies the first year. Wright Enright also illustrated Baum's Policeman Bluejay (1907) and L. Frank Baum's Juvenile Speaker (1910, with John R. Neill). (Her husband also worked on the Baum canon: Walter Enright illustrated Baum's Father Goose's Year Book in 1907.) She illustrated the book Flower Fairies, an alternate version of this title, written by Clara Ingram Judson, in 1915.

She also illustrated editions of Johanna Spyri's Heidi (1921) and Mary Mapes Dodge's Hans Brinker or the Silver Skates (with Edna Cooke, 1918). She was acclaimed as one of "the very best artists" for children.

She wrote and illustrated The Baby's Record Through the First Year in Song and Story (1928), and compiled and illustrated Weather Signs and Rhymes (1931). She also illustrated textbooks for children, mainly readers for younger children. Her daughter Elizabeth Enright credits Wright Enright with "the revolutionizing of textbook illustration" with lively, graceful, and imaginative pictures that appealed to young readers.

== Other work ==
In addition to book illustration, Wright Enright was a magazine illustrator and cover artist, working mostly for women's magazines like McClure's and the Ladies' Home Journal. She also designed Christmas cards and did various and miscellaneous sorts of artwork. In the memoir Tales of Taliesin, Cornelia Brierly recalls Maginel, "full of fun and very sophisticated", spending summers with her daughter Elizabeth ("Bitsy") at her brother's establishment Taliesin, designing and making "yarn paintings" that she later sold in New York. In the 1940s, she distinguished herself as a shoe designer, creating high-fashion jeweled and sequined shoes, which were manufactured by Capezio.
