= Barney E. Warren =

American Christian hymnwriter and minister

Barney Elliott Warren
- Farther Along, arranged by Barney E. Warren
- Born: February 20, 1867; Lewiston, New York
- Died: April 21, 1951 (aged 84); Springfield, Ohio
- Occupations: Christian hymnwriter and minister

Barney Elliott Warren was an American Christian hymnwriter and minister. He was born in Lewiston, New York, on February 20, 1867. In 1884, during a revival meeting at Grand Junction near Bangor, Michigan, he converted to the Church of God of Anderson, Indiana. Two years later, he joined Daniel Sidney Warner as a bass in his company of singers. He married Nannie Kigar, another member of that company. He served as minister and pastor to several congregations. From 1888 to 1940, he worked on song books and hymnals for the Gospel Trumpet Company, the publishing arm of that Church of God. He died on April 21, 1951, in Springfield, Ohio, and is buried in Vale Cemetery there. He has been credited with writing either the words or the music or both for more than 2000 hymns and children's songs; but as of 2015, almost all have fallen out of fashion, though a number of Church of God congregations still sing them weekly. Together with Daniel Sidney Warner he published in 1893 the hymnal Echoes from Glory,

== Songs ==
- "It is Truly Wonderful", 1897
- "Joy Unspeakable"
- "Lost Forever", 1893
- "Under His Wings", 1897
- "Farther Along", 1911 (arranged)
- "There Is Joy In The Lord",1900
- "Sing About Jesus"
- "Behold What Love"
- "Glory to God in the Highest"
- "The Blameless Church"
- "Long Have They Waited" (refrain & music)
- "Why Carelessly Wait?"
- "Where Will I Go"
- "Weighed in the Balance"
- "Savior, I'm Coming"
- "A Ransom for All" (music)
- "His Yoke is Easy" (music)
- "Watch unto Prayer" (music)
- "I Would Be Closer to Thee"
- "The Temple of God" (music)
- "Ever Lead Me"
- "Keep Me Near Thee" (music)
- "Come Closer to Me"
- "Let Not Your Heart Be Troubled"
- "The Bond of Perfectness" (music)
- "Not Dead, But Sleeping" (music)
- "Two Little Hands" (music)
- “Victory” (music)
- "I am a Child of God" 1907
