= The Enchanted Island of Yew =

1903 novel by L. Frank Baum

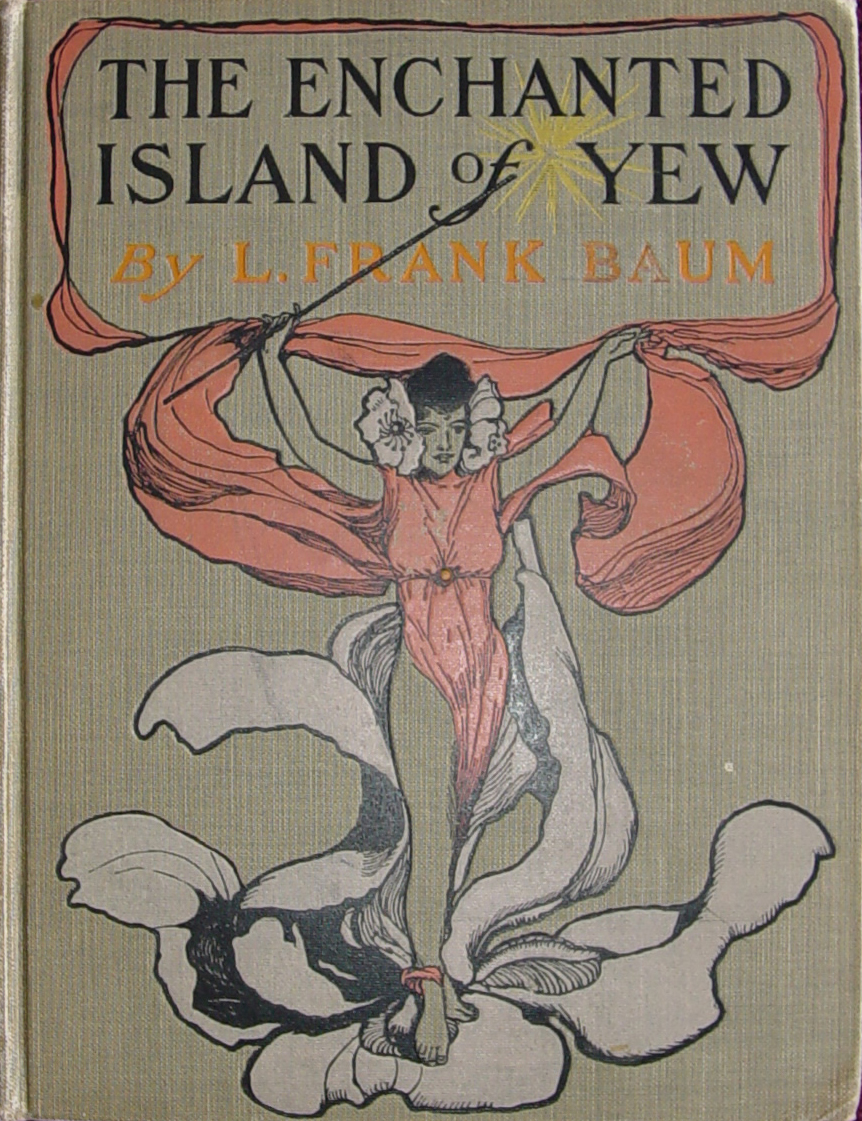
- Cover illustration by Fanny Cory
- Author: L. Frank Baum
- Illustrator: Fanny Y. Cory
- Language: English
- Genre: Children's novel
- Publisher: Bobbs-Merrill
- Publication date: 1903
- Publication place: United States
- Media type: Print (hardcover)

The Enchanted Island of Yew: Whereon Prince Marvel Encountered the High Ki of Twi and Other Surprising People is a children's fantasy novel written by L. Frank Baum, illustrated by Fanny Y. Cory, and published by the Bobbs-Merrill Company in 1903.

The first edition contained eight color plates and many colored-ink illustrations stamped over the text, and it was dedicated to Kenneth Gage Baum, the youngest of the author's four sons.

== Synopsis ==
Sesely, daughter of Baron Merd of Heg, and two companions are enjoying a picnic in the Forest of Lurla when they are accosted by a fairy. The fairy, bored with centuries of insipid fairy life, amazes the girls by pleading to be changed into a mortal. Though the girls are surprised that they might have the power to do such a thing, the fairy explains how it can be done. The girls agree to transform the fairy into a human boy for the space of one year. The newly minted male is dubbed Prince Marvel, and, furnished with fairy arms and armor and an enchanted horse (a deer transformed), sets out to have adventures.

Since Yew is so dominated by robbers and rogues, Prince Marvel does not have to travel far to find said adventures. He starts off by confronting and besting the bandits of Wul-Takim, the self-styled King of Thieves. Marvel captures all fifty-nine of the band and is ready to send them to the gallows – but Wul-Takim convinces the naive ex-fairy that the robbers are now honest men, whom it would be unfair to hang. Marvel rescues a prisoner from the robbers, a young man named Nerle, who becomes Marvel's squire-boy. The match is a good one: while Marvel yearns for adventure, Nerle actually longs to suffer pain and deprivation, and often reproaches Marvel for saving him from harm.

A greater challenge awaits him in Spor, where he faces the Royal Dragon of the hideous and evil King Terribus. The dragon is visually spectacular:

...more than thirty feet in length and covered everywhere with large green scales set with diamonds, making the dragon, whenever it moved, a very glittering spectacle. Its eyes were as big as pie plates, and its mouth—when wide opened—fully as large as a bathtub. Its tail was very long and ended in a golden ball, such as you see on the top of flagstaffs. Its legs, which were as thick as those of an elephant, had scales which were set with rubies and emeralds.

The dragon, however, is far less formidable than it appears: its inner fire was blown out in a gale, and its keepers are out of matches. It can't lash its tail or gnash its teeth, either—because they hurt. In the end, even after getting its fire re-lit, the beast refuses to fight Prince Marvel; it's too much a gentleman. With such opposition, it isn't surprising that Marvel is victorious in Spor as well. He persuades King Terribus to become virtuous by magically changing his hideous face into a handsome one.

He next has a stay in the curious hidden kingdom of Twi. It is a land of perpetual twilight, hence its name. Everything is doubled in Twi, and everyone is a twin. The people even lack a word for "one". The local rulers, the High Ki of Twi (twins like everyone else), are considering the fate of the intruding Marvel, when he places a spell on the twins, dividing them from their united and shared mind into two separate consciousnesses. The results are chaotic, and Marvel has to remedy the mess by re-uniting the twins.

Marvel next exposes the pretended magician Kwytoffle (a fraud, like the more famous Wizard of Oz). He meets his sternest test when he confronts the Red Rogue of Dawna; even then, however, his native fairy abilities enable him to emerge victorious. By the end of his mortal year, Marvel has pacified the formerly troublesome inhabitants; the Island of Yew has become civilized.

Baum adapted material from the novel into Prince Marvel, a short play for children printed in 1910 in L. Frank Baum's Juvenile Speaker.

== Influences ==
In her biography of Baum, Katharine Rogers notes than Baum first used the name Kwytoffle in his stage adaptation of Prince Silverwings and Other Fairy Tales (1902), by Edith Ogden Harrison. In 1903 Baum was working with Harrison on a theater version of her successful book. The play was supposed to premier in the summer of 1904, but the disastrous Iroquois Theater Fire in December 1903 forced the mayor of Chicago (who was, oddly enough, Edith Harrison's husband) to order the city's theaters closed. Silverwings never made it onto the boards.

Rogers suggests other influences from Baum's adaptation of Silverwings on his fiction. In the play, Kwytoffle is the name of the Gnome King, who has kidnapped the Storm King's daughter and threatens to throw Silverwings and her other would-be rescuers into his furnace—comparable to elements in Baum's Oz books. Kwytoffle has a problem with beans, just as Baum's Nome King has with eggs. Harrison's Cloud Maidens appear in Dorothy and the Wizard in Oz. In Silverwings, Charminia, Queen of the Fairies, sends her minions to comfort distressed mortals; in Zixi of Ix Queen Lulea sends a fairy to deliver the magic cloak to the most unhappy person to be found.

== Reprint editions ==
The Enchanted Island of Yew was out of print for more than fifty years in the middle and later twentieth century. It was re-issued with Cory's illustrations by the small press Buckethead Enterprises of Oz in 1988, and by Books of Wonder, with new illustrations by George O'Connor, in 1996. Subsequent unillustrated editions followed from Lightning Source (2001), Wildside Press (2001), and 1st World Library (2005).
