= The Twinkle Tales =

1905 series by L. Frank Baum

First collected edition

The Twinkle Tales is a 1905 series by L. Frank Baum, published under the pen name Laura Bancroft. The six stories were issued in separate booklets by Baum's publisher Reilly & Britton, with illustrations by Maginel Wright Enright. In 1911, the six eight-chapter stories were collected as Twinkle and Chubbins; Their Astonishing Adventures in Nature-Fairyland—a misnomer, as Chubbins appears in only two stories and few are set in "Nature-Fairyland". The book was followed by Policeman Bluejay, which was retitled Babes in Birdland for its second edition. Baum later wanted these Bancroft stories published under his own name, and in 1917 his publisher released a second edition of Babes in Birdland (third edition overall) with Baum's name for the first time.

== List of stories ==
- Mr. Woodchuck
- Bandit Jim Crow
- Prairie-Dog Town
- Prince Mud-Turtle
- Twinkle's Enchantment
- Sugar-Loaf Mountain

== Plot summaries ==
Mr. Woodchuck is about the time Twinkle's father sets a trap for a woodchuck that lives near his property. Twinkle goes to see the woodchuck get caught, and has a dream in which she meets the woodchuck and his family. The woodchucks put her on trial for being a human, because humans set cruel traps for the purposes of killing woodchucks. Twinkle is sentenced to be put in a trap herself, and when she wakes up from the dream, she convinces her father never to set traps for animals ever again.

Bandit Jim Crow is about a baby crow with a broken wing that Twinkle adopts for a pet. The crow has an evil nature, and as soon as his wing is healed, he kills the family's chickens and escapes to a section of the forest inhabited by birds. There, Jim Crow starts stealing and eating other birds' eggs, until the birds get Policeman Bluejay to keep Jim Crow in check. Jim then disguises himself with chalk, and continues stealing eggs. All the birds attack the disguised Jim Crow, and blind him. Jim Crow is forced to spend the rest of his life helpless, living off of the kindness of the other birds.

Prairie-Dog Town is about how Twinkle and her friend Chubbins go to have a picnic near a prairie dog village. The prairie dogs talk to the children, and the children are magically shrunk down to prairie-dog size so they can enter the village. Inside, they meet a well-to-do family and the mayor of the prairie dog village. The two children are returned to their normal size, and wonder if the whole adventure was simply a dream. (Compare a similar story, "The Discontented Gopher," in Baum's Animal Fairy Tales.)

Prince Mud-Turtle is about Twinkle finding an unusually-colored turtle and bringing it home with her. She later finds that the turtle is a fairy prince named Melga who was put under a curse by the evil Corrugated Giant, a creature with no bones. With the help of the turtle, Twinkle is able to travel to the giant's castle and restore the prince to his normal form. The prince then defeats the giant, and Twinkle is sent back home.

Twinkle's Enchantment is about Twinkle entering a gulch in order to get some berries. She meets many curious proverb-based creatures, such a Rolling Stone That Gathers No Moss, a Little Learning (which she avoids because it is a dangerous thing), a Weasel that Goes "Pop!", and the Birds of One Feather. She then spends time with a dancing bear, and is invited to a grasshopper's ball. She wakes up.

Sugar-Loaf Mountain is about how Twinkle and her friend Chubbins discover a trap door in Sugar-Loaf Mountain. They find a key and enter inside the mountain, where they find a city peopled by beings made entirely out of sugar of one form or another. They are captured by soldiers and taken to the king, who shows them the sights and introduces them to several high-grade citizens. While leaving, Twinkle and Chubbins accidentally drop the key inside, so no one can ever enter Sugar-Loaf Mountain again.
