= By the Candelabra's Glare =

1898 collection of poems written by L. Frank Baum

- First edition
- Author: L. Frank Baum
- Illustrator: N. Guy Chilberg, Charles J. Costello, W. W. Denslow, et al.
- Cover artist: Charles J. Costello
- Language: English
- Genre: Poetry
- Publisher: Privately printed
- Publication date: 1898
- Publication place: United States
- Media type: Print (Hardcover)
- Pages: 89 pp.

By the Candelabra's Glare is an 1898 collection of poems written by L. Frank Baum. One of his earliest works, the book was significant in Baum's evolution from amateur to professional author.

== The book ==
Baum's first book, Mother Goose in Prose, had been published in 1897 by the Chicago firm Way and Williams. The book was attractively produced, with illustrations by a young Maxfield Parrish; but its relatively high price for a children's book limited its commercial success. Publisher Way and Williams went bankrupt in 1898. For his second book, Baum reverted to his earlier amateur mode. Baum had had his own printing press as a youth, and had created a family newspaper; in 1898 he obtained another small printing press and some cases of type, and personally printed and bound 99 copies of a collection of his verse. Baum's sons took over the press when he was done with it.

== Help from friends ==
Baum had lived in Chicago since 1891, and was intimate with a circle of the city's journalists and newspaper artists. Through his trade journal The Show Window, he knew publishers too. He solicited a coterie of friends to help him with his vanity project: he "relied on friends in the publishing trade to provide the paper, zinc etchings, inks, all other materials, including the illustrations." Eight local artists supplied pictures for the book. The eight were:

- Ralph Fletcher Seymour, who would hand-letter Baum's Father Goose: His Book the following year;
- Charles Jerome Costello, who would help Seymour with the Father Goose lettering, and who would hand-letter Baum's The Army Alphabet and The Navy Alphabet in 1900;
- Thomas Mitchell Pierce, a son-in-law of Baum's sister Harriet Alvena Baum Neal who would illustrate Baum's Daughters of Destiny in 1906;
- N. Guy Chilberg;
- Frank Hazenplug;
- Charles M. Tuttle;
- Gwynne C. Price, the only woman among the eight;
- and most significantly, W. W. Denslow, who would illustrate three more Baum books in three years — Father Goose (1899), The Wonderful Wizard of Oz (1900), and Dot and Tot of Merryland (1901).

Baum dedicated the book to friend (and future creditor) Harrison H. Rountree, a businessman and brother-in-law of Chauncey L. Williams (the Williams in Way and Williams, Baum's first book publisher). Rountree would control the rights to The Wonderful Wizard of Oz and other Baum books for two decades (1911–32), after Baum went bankrupt.

== The verse ==
The 41 poems in the Candelabra collection include sentimental and humorous verses that Baum had composed over the preceding years, some of which had been printed in newspapers, including Baum's own South Dakota paper, The Aberdeen Pioneer. One of the poems is "La Reine est Mort – Vive La Reine," a humorous look at early feminists.

And shout hurrah for the woman new!
With her necktie, shirt and toothpick shoe,
With tailor-made suit and mien severe

She's here!

Another poem, "Two Women," provides a more serious view of the same subject, in a contrast between "woman Old" and "woman New." A poem from the South Dakota years, "Nance Adkins," has a farm wife as its heroine.

== Aftermath ==
Though By the Candelabra's Glare was a privately printed vanity project, it led to Baum's first literary and commercial breakthrough. The final section of the book featured nine Baum poems for children; Baum decided to expand this into a new collection. The result was his and Denslow's Father Goose, a major and pathbreaking success of 1899 that launched Baum's literary career. (Two poems appear in both books.)

Copies of the original edition of By the Candelabra's Glare are "now extremely rare and much sought by collectors." The book was published again in facsimile in 1981, with an introduction by Baum scholar Peter Hanff.
