= USS Barney =

Three ships of the United States Navy have been named Barney for Commodore Joshua Barney.

- USS Barney (TB-25) was a torpedo boat in commission from 1901 to 1916 and from 1917 to 1919
- USS Barney (DD-149) was a Wickes-class destroyer in commission from 1919 to 1922 and from 1930 to 1945
- USS Barney (DDG-6) was a Charles F. Adams-class guided-missile destroyer in commission from 1962 to 1990

== See also ==
- USS Commodore Barney (1859), a ferry boat used by the Union Navy during the American Civil War
