= L. Frank Baum's Juvenile Speaker =

1910 anthology of literary works by L. Frank Baum

- First edition
- Author: L. Frank Baum
- Illustrator: Maginel Wright Enright; John R. Neill
- Language: English
- Genre: Poetry, Humor, Fantasy, Drama
- Publisher: Reilly & Britton
- Publication date: 1910
- Publication place: United States
- Media type: Print (hardcover)
- Pages: 196 pp.

L. Frank Baum's Juvenile Speaker: Readings and Recitations in Prose and Verse, Humorous and Otherwise is an anthology of literary works by L. Frank Baum, author of the Oz books. The book was first published in 1910, with illustrations by veteran Baum artists John R. Neill and Maginel Wright Enright; a subsequent 1912 edition was retitled Baum's Own Book for Children. The book constitutes a complex element in the Baum bibliography.

Baum intended the anthology for schools, to be used in instruction in public speaking. The collection includes versions of previously published material from Baum's Oz books, Father Goose, and other works, plus new selections like Prince Marvel, a short play for child actors based on The Enchanted Island of Yew.

One of the selections is "Little Bun Rabbit," the final piece in Baum's Mother Goose in Prose from 1897. The protagonist in Baum's version of the nursery rhyme is a little girl who can talk to animals – named Dorothy. When Baum reprinted in story in his Juvenile Speaker, he changed the character's name to Doris, to forestall confusion with Dorothy Gale from The Wonderful Wizard of Oz.

Baum made other revisions in his reprinted texts. One example: the 20th chapter in The Wonderful Wizard, "The Dainty China Country," was revised into a stand-alone tale, "In Chinaland;" and Baum removed the detail in which the Cowardly Lion accidentally destroys a small china church with his tail.

== Reprints ==
Materials from the Juvenile Speaker were republished in different volumes in later years. In 1916 and 1917, Baum's publisher Reilly & Britton issued stories from the anthology in six smaller 62-page books collectively called The Snuggle Tales, with black-and-white Neill illustrations. (They were originally sold for $0.40 each.) The publisher had used this approach successfully in the Little Wizard Stories of Oz in 1913–14, as a way of reaching beginning readers. The six Snuggle Tales books are:

- Little Bun Rabbit and Other Stories (1916)
- Once Upon a Time and Other Stories (1916)
- The Yellow Hen and Other Stories (1916)
- The Magic Cloak and Other Stories (1916)
- The Gingerbread Man (1917)
- Jack Pumpkinhead (1917).

In turn, The Snuggle Tales were later republished with added color plates as the Oz-Man Tales, issued in 1920.

To illustrate the type of materials involved, consider the contents of the fourth Snuggle Tales volume, The Magic Cloak and Other Stories:

- "The Weaving of the Magic Cloak" — from Queen Zixi of Ix
- "When the Whistle Blows" (poem)
- "In Chinaland" — from The Wonderful Wizard of Oz
- "The Greedy Goldfish" (poem) — from Father Goose, His Book
- "Santa Claus's First Journey" — from The Life and Adventures of Santa Claus
- "The Head of the King" — from The Magical Monarch of Mo
- "The Tramp" (poem) — from By the Candelabra's Glare
- "The Mantle of Immortality" — from The Life and Adventures of Santa Claus
- "The King of Thieves" — from The Enchanted Island of Yew
- "Melting a Wicked Witch" — from The Wonderful Wizard of Oz
- "Miss Violin's Beau" (a punning poem)
- "The Beautiful Valley of Mo" — from The Magical Monarch of Mo.
