= Barney Creek (Lorain County, Ohio) =

Coordinates: 41°20′55″N 82°19′42″W

Barney Creek is a former name for a creek within Amherst Township, Lorain County, Ohio. It is possibly an alternate name for Little Beaver Creek, or perhaps was simply a typographical-error for "Barnes Creek". Modern maps do not have "Little Beaver Creek" labeled separately, but only designate it as being a sub-branch of Beaver Creek.
