= Father Goose: His Book =

Book by L. Frank Baum

- First edition
- Author: L. Frank Baum
- Illustrator: W. W. Denslow
- Language: English
- Genre: Children's literature Humor, Fantasy
- Publisher: George M. Hill Company
- Publication date: 1899
- Publication place: United States
- Media type: Print (Hardcover)
- Pages: 106 pp.

Father Goose: His Book is a collection of nonsense poetry for children, written by L. Frank Baum and illustrated by W. W. Denslow, and first published in 1899. Though generally neglected a century later, the book was a groundbreaking sensation in its own era; "once America's best-selling children's book and L. Frank Baum's first success," Father Goose laid a foundation for the writing career that soon led to The Wonderful Wizard of Oz and all of Baum's later work.

== Collaboration ==
The book grew out of Baum's first published verse collection, the previous year's By the Candelabra's Glare, which concluded with a section of poems for children. Baum expanded upon that section to create a new collection of nonsense verse; the 72 poems in Father Goose included two from the earlier book. Denslow had contributed two illustrations to Baum's first collection of poems, and had worked on Baum's trade periodical, The Show Window — though Father Goose was the two men's first sustained collaborative project. It was notable as a generally equal collaboration: Denslow sometimes drew pictures to Baum's poems, but Baum sometimes wrote or revised his verse in response to Denslow's drawings. Most commentators agree that Denslow's pictures outmatch Baum's texts; Denslow's illustrations for Father Goose have been considered his best work.

"Denslow's pictures are both stylish and humorous. Moreover, he did not merely draw illustrations for the verse; he arranged pictures, color, and text to make an artistically unified page, so that the book resembled 'a series of art posters bound together.'" The result "is more Denslow's than Baum's book, for the art dominates and at times overpowers the text." (Denslow appreciated the quality of his own work; in a portent of future trouble between the two collaborators, he drafted a cover for the book with his own name in larger letters than Baum's. Denslow had to be talked into re-doing the cover with greater equality.)

== Publisher ==
When the two men sought out a publisher for their book, they settled with the George M. Hill Co. In uniting Baum, Denslow, and Hill, Father Goose mustered the forces that would produce The Wonderful Wizard of Oz in the following year. Hill, however, was not prepared to risk much money on the two untried collaborators; their original deal required Baum and Denslow to pay for the full costs of printing the book. Subsequently, Hill invested some funds in the project: Baum and Denslow paid for all the artistic aspects of the book, including printing the color plates and cover and even the advertising, while Hill took responsibility for the paper, binding, and distribution costs.

To save money on printing, Baum and Denslow had the poetry hand-lettered by friend and artist Ralph Fletcher Seymour. Seymour was assisted by fellow artist Charles Michael Jerome Costello; both men had contributed to By the Candelabra's Glare. Seymour would eventually be paid $67.25 for his work, and Costello $30.00.

== Success ==
Father Goose was on sale in September 1899, in plenty of time for the Christmas season. It was a major success, selling more than 75,000 copies. The quality of the illustrations was far beyond anything that had been done in American children's books up to that time. Its marketplace success inspired at least a score of imitations in the next season, an Old Father Gander and a Mother Wild Goose and others; one Chicago newspaper commented on these "Goose pimples in the book trade this year." Denslow's work affected the style of illustration in other children's books, generally for the better.

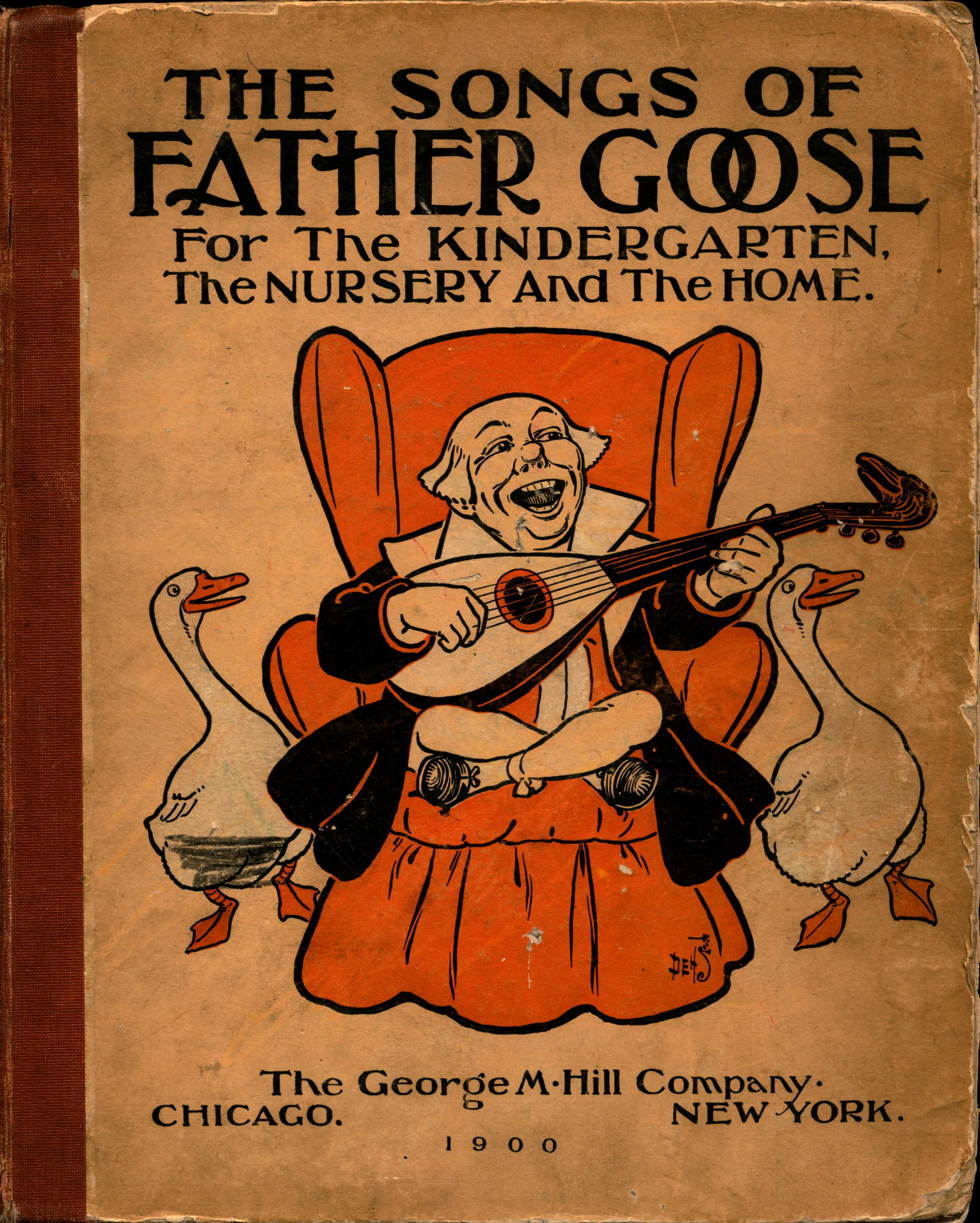
The Songs of Father Goose, 1900: front cover (apparent child's marking on lower part of goose on the left).

The critical reception of the book was generally quite positive. Father Goose was also admired and enjoyed by figures like Mark Twain and William Dean Howells. Baum used some of his royalties from the book to buy a lakeside house in Macatawa, Michigan; he named the place "The Sign of the Goose" and decorated it with goose motifs.

Baum and Denslow followed up their triumph with The Songs of Father Goose (1900), which provided musical settings by composer Alberta Neiswanger Hall for 26 of the poems. Though not as popular as the original work, the songbook also sold well. Further projects to capitalize on the success, however, like a Father Goose Calendar, and a musical version that Baum and composer Paul Tietjens worked on in 1904, failed to materialize — though Baum would publish Father Goose's Year Book in 1907.

Selections from Father Goose were reprinted in Baum's 1910 anthology L. Frank Baum's Juvenile Speaker.

== The verse ==
Baum stated the premise of his collection clearly in his opening rhyme:

Old Mother Goose became quite new,
And joined a Women's Club,
She left poor Father Goose at home
To care for Sis and Bub.
They called for stories by the score,
And laughed and cried to hear
All of the queer and merry songs
That in this book appear....

Baum's nonsense poems lack the sophistication of those of other nineteenth authors such as such Edward Lear or Lewis Carroll. However, according to biographer, Michael Riley, his verse was appealing to young children for “the cadences of its rhymes and in the very personal images and associations" that they invoked; for example:

Did you ever see a rabbit climb a tree?
Did you ever see a lobster ride a flea?

Did you ever?
No, you never!

For they simply couldn't do it, don't you see?

Riley goes on to note that "the rhymes of Father Goose: His Book are all but forgotten" today. Baum largely abandoned verse for prose in The Wonderful Wizard of Oz which has taken its place as the classic American fairy tale". Nevertheless, he did not forgo poetry books entirely. His small books, Army Alphabet and Navy Alphabet, (each consisted of patriotic poems beginning with a different letter of the alphabet) were published in 1990 the same year as The Wizard. Then, as noted above, he published an ostensibly racist book of non-sense poems for adults in 1907 called Father Goose's Year Book, Quaint Quacks and Feathered Shafts for Mature Children. It had an illustration of Father Goose on the cover and was apparently intended to be sarcastic.

The Songs of Father Goose, 1900 (songs played from score)
Did You Ever See a Rabbit, verse 1.

The Ostrich Dance

The Bandit

== Biases and cultural perspectives ==
Although Baum was comparatively progressive at the time he was writing, he sometimes exploited the racial and ethnic stereotypes common in his era for comic effect. Michael Hearn described Father Goose as

one of the few of the period that tried to reflect the contemporary United States, perhaps the first picture book to recognize the American urban melting pot. Today Baum and Denslow's depictions of African American, Irish, Italian, Chinese, North American Indians, and others are unacceptable, being patronizing stereotypes once common to vaudeville, the Sunday funny papers, and other forms of popular art. However, Father Goose, unlike the conventional children's book of the time, did acknowledge that people of color and other cultures, however offensively portrayed here, were as much a part of American life as those of Anglo-Saxon descent.

Baum's stereotypes were given added appeal to children by Denslow's illustrations. In his book,Chromographia: American literature and the modernization of color, Nicholas Gaskill notes for example:

The Chinaman’s pigtail is extended in one of Denslow’s serpentine lines; the poem about the "nigger boy" dips into dialect and pokes fun at his poverty; the Irish lad lazes around and eventually joins the police force; the "funny" "Injun" doll, painted with bright red stripes, stands opposite its delicately shaded white owner. In each case the "fun" of the rhymes depends on the perpetuation of racist libel aimed at inflating the white reader’s sense of privilege while delighting the youthful hunger for vivid hues.

Furthermore, Gaskill describes a prevailing perception among the white upperclass at the time (which perhaps persists even now according to one reviewer) that "primitive" peoples had an inordinate foundness for bright colors. Therefore Denslow's "colorful style had to invoke the wondrous perceptions of childhood without advocating a primitivism that parents would not accept", i.e. "bright without being lurid".

Gaskill also noted a theme of imperialism in Father Goose. In one scene, the narrator laments "Pray. What can a civilized boy do now?", i.e. when all the dragons have been killed and the giants beheaded. The answer is provided in an illustration of a boy imagining himself to be a member of the Rough Riders (founded the year before the book was published) and another boy launching an American Navy ship to fight "Her Country’s enemy".

For perspective of the issue of tolerance versus bias in Baum's canon, see Daughters of Destiny, Father Goose's Year Book, Sam Steele's Adventures on Land and Sea, Sky Island, and The Woggle-Bug Book.

== Gallery ==
Father Goose: His Book, 1899 (c. 1904 printing)
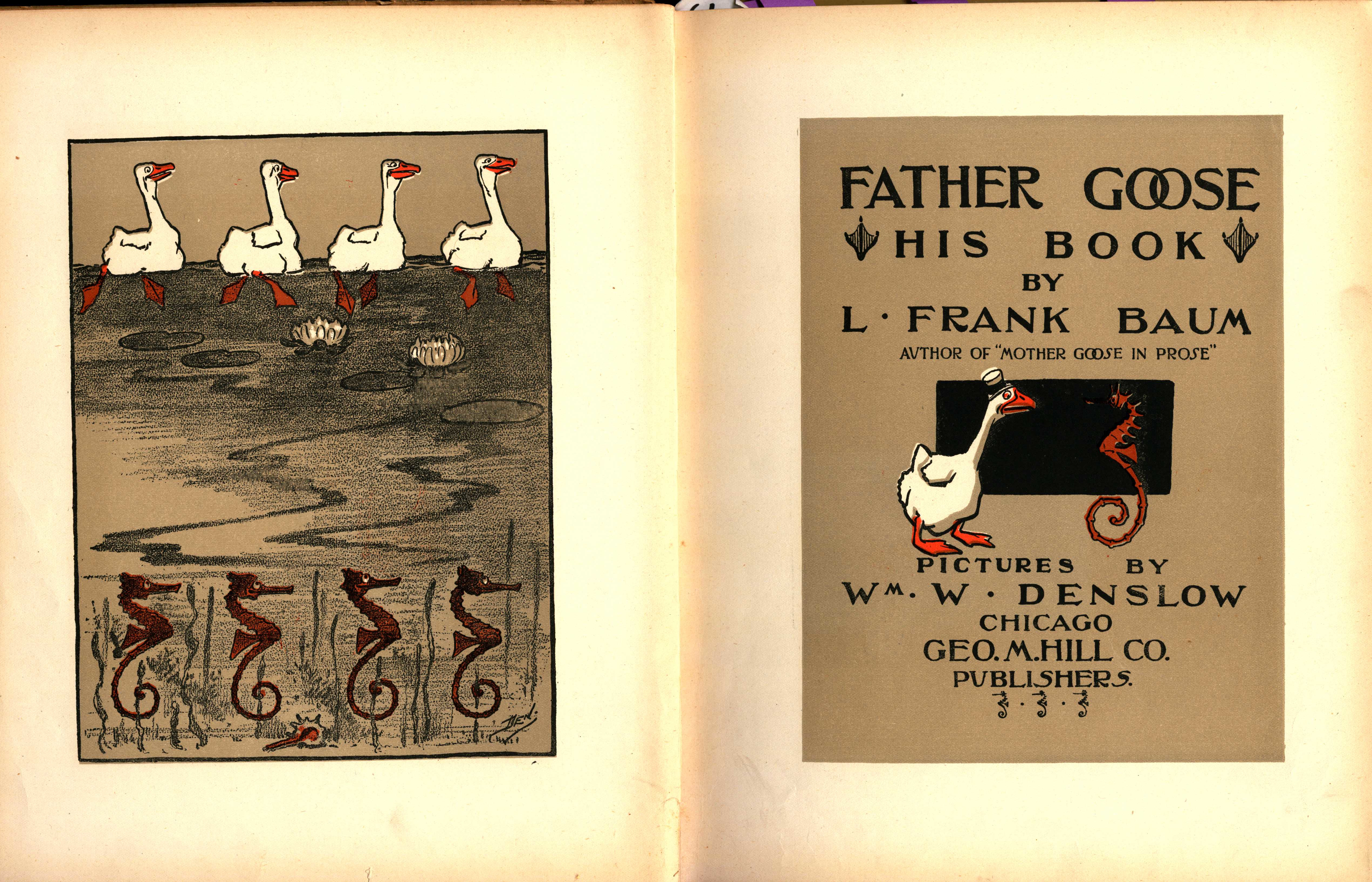

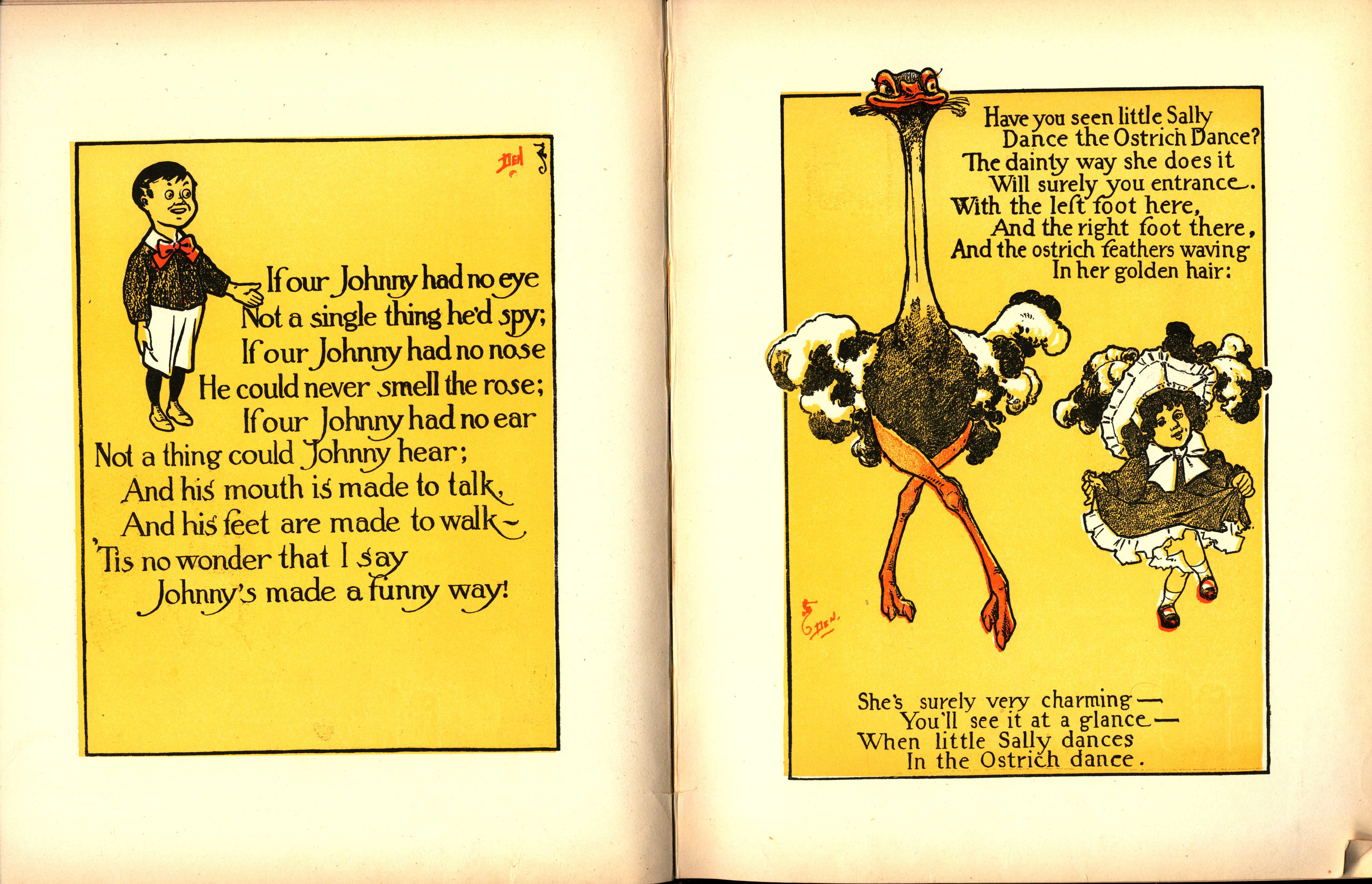

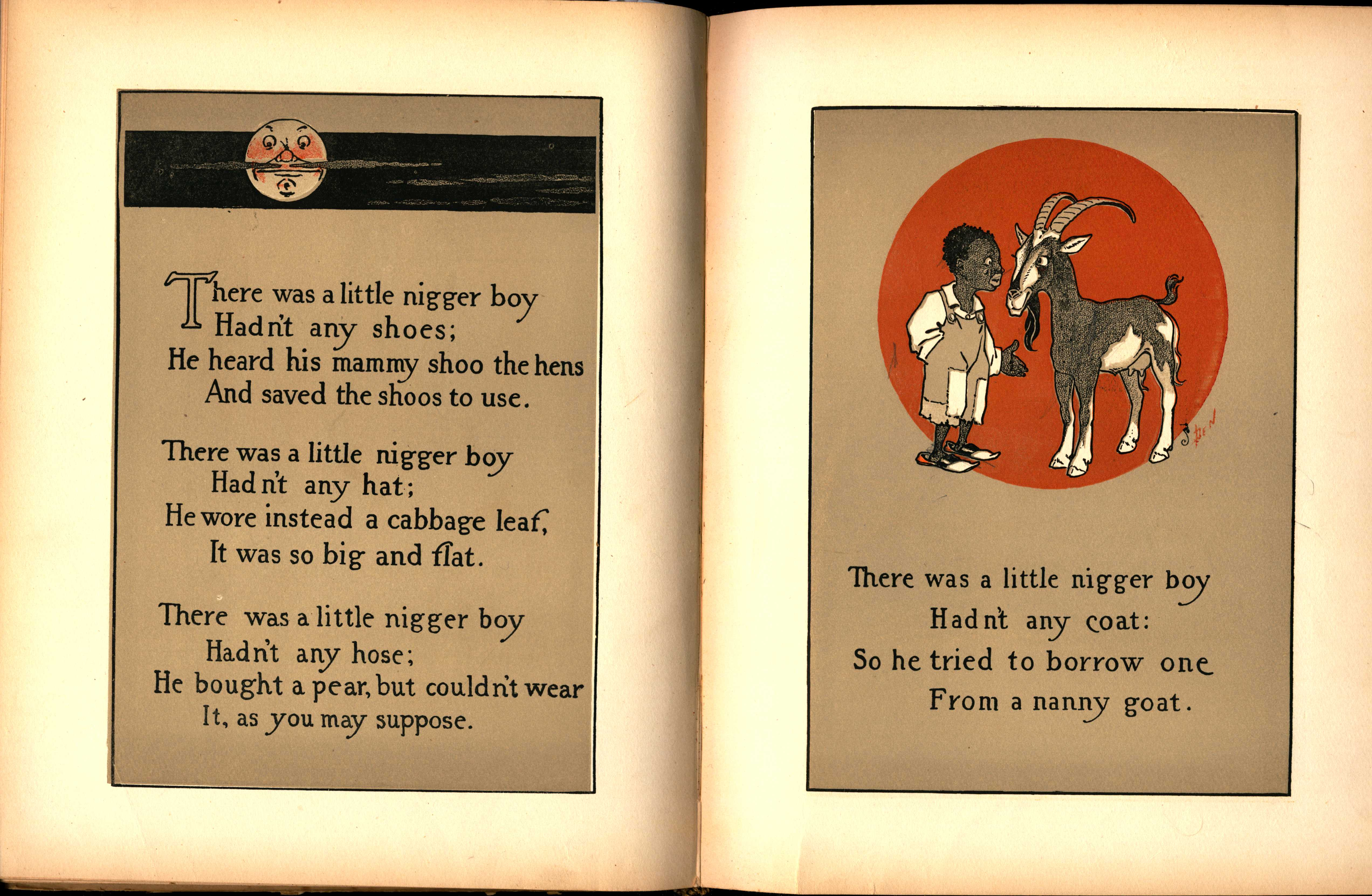

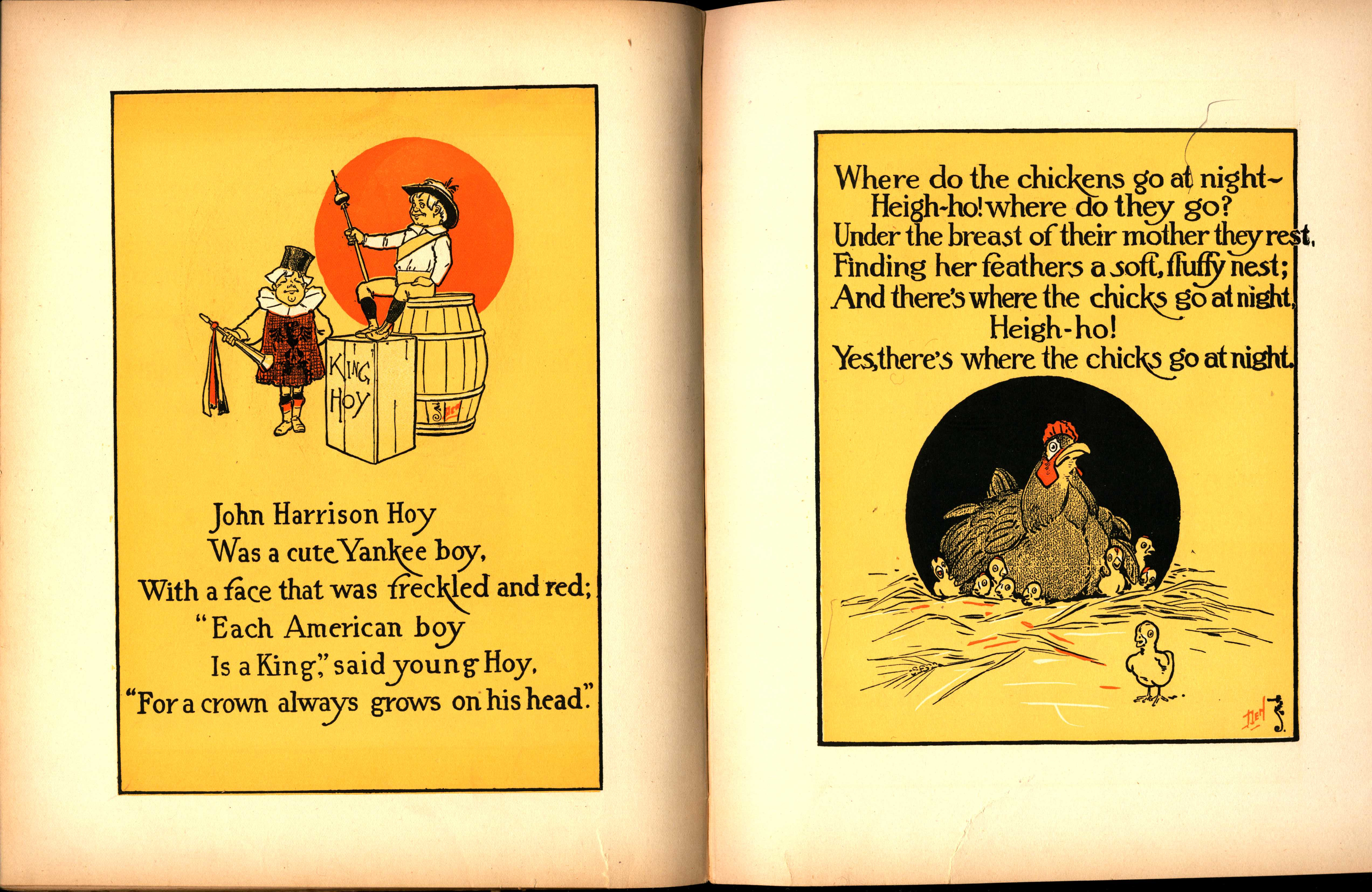

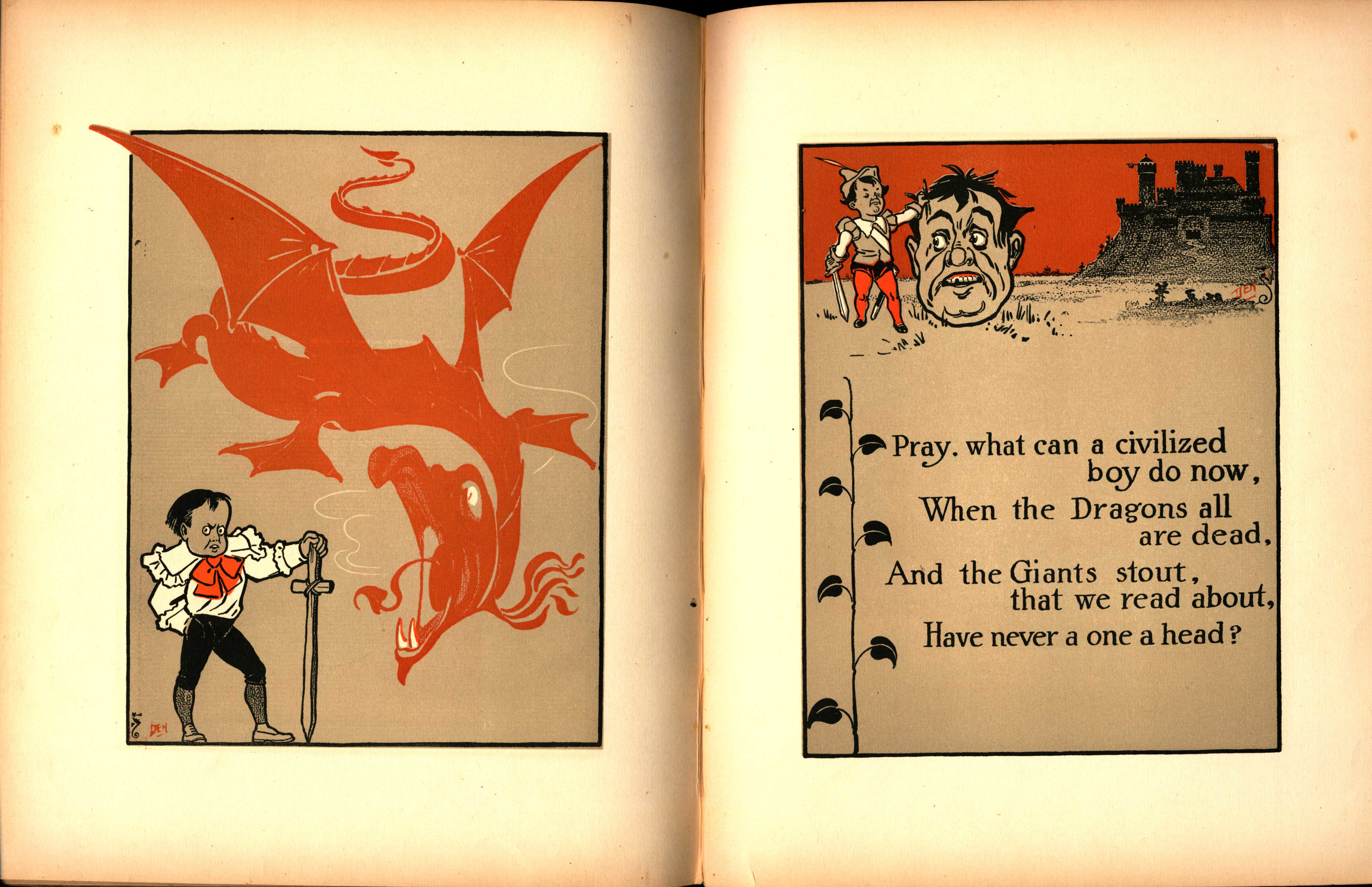

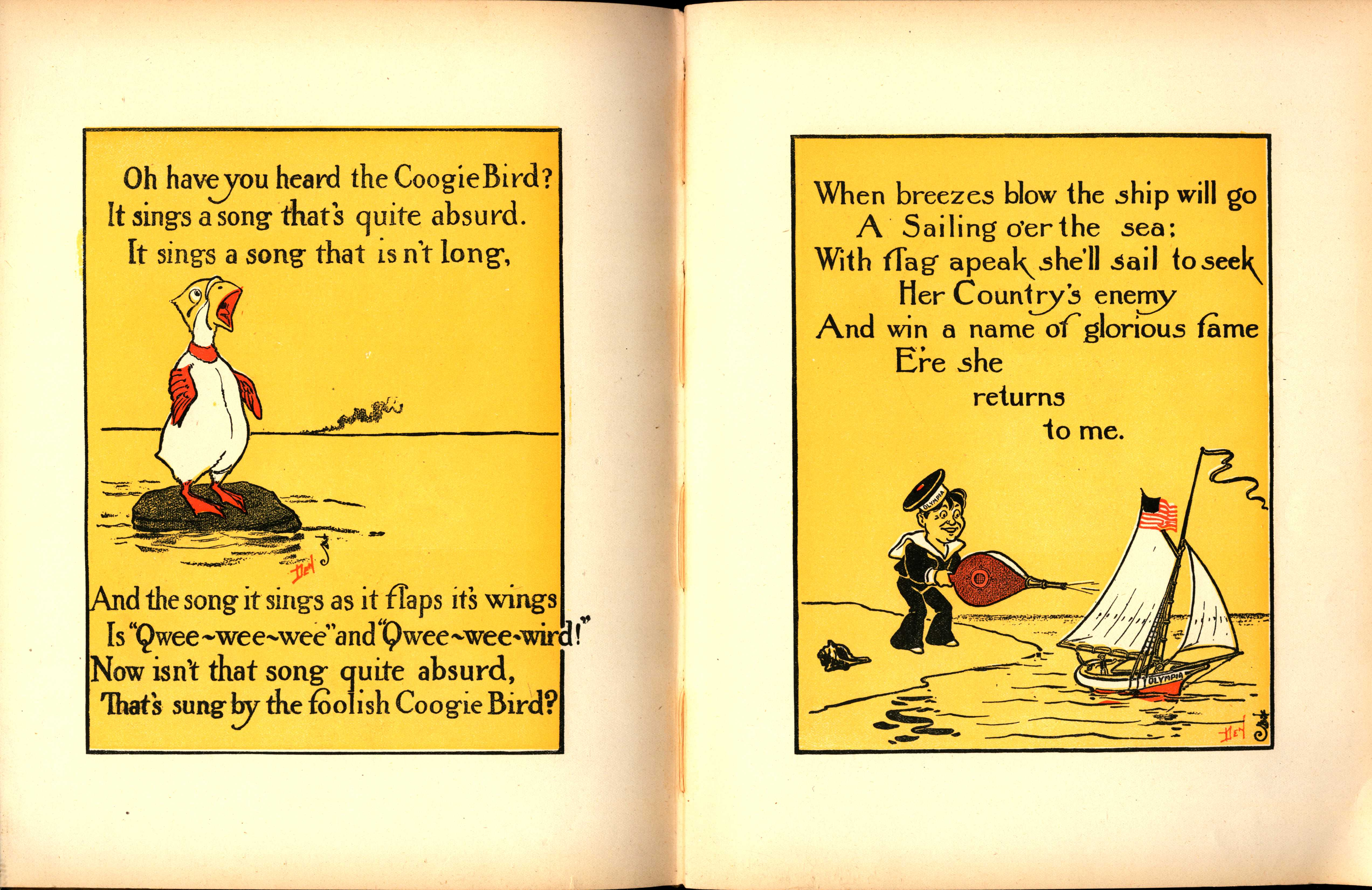

== Denslow's progression ==
After the completion of Father Goose, Denslow continued to illustrate nursery rhymes on his own. For example, he did two comic pages for the New York World based on Father Goose. The first, issued in January 1900, did not mention Baum. Baum objected and the second comic page, issued in July, credits Baum’s collaboration on the book as well as the forthcoming Wonderful Wizard of Oz.

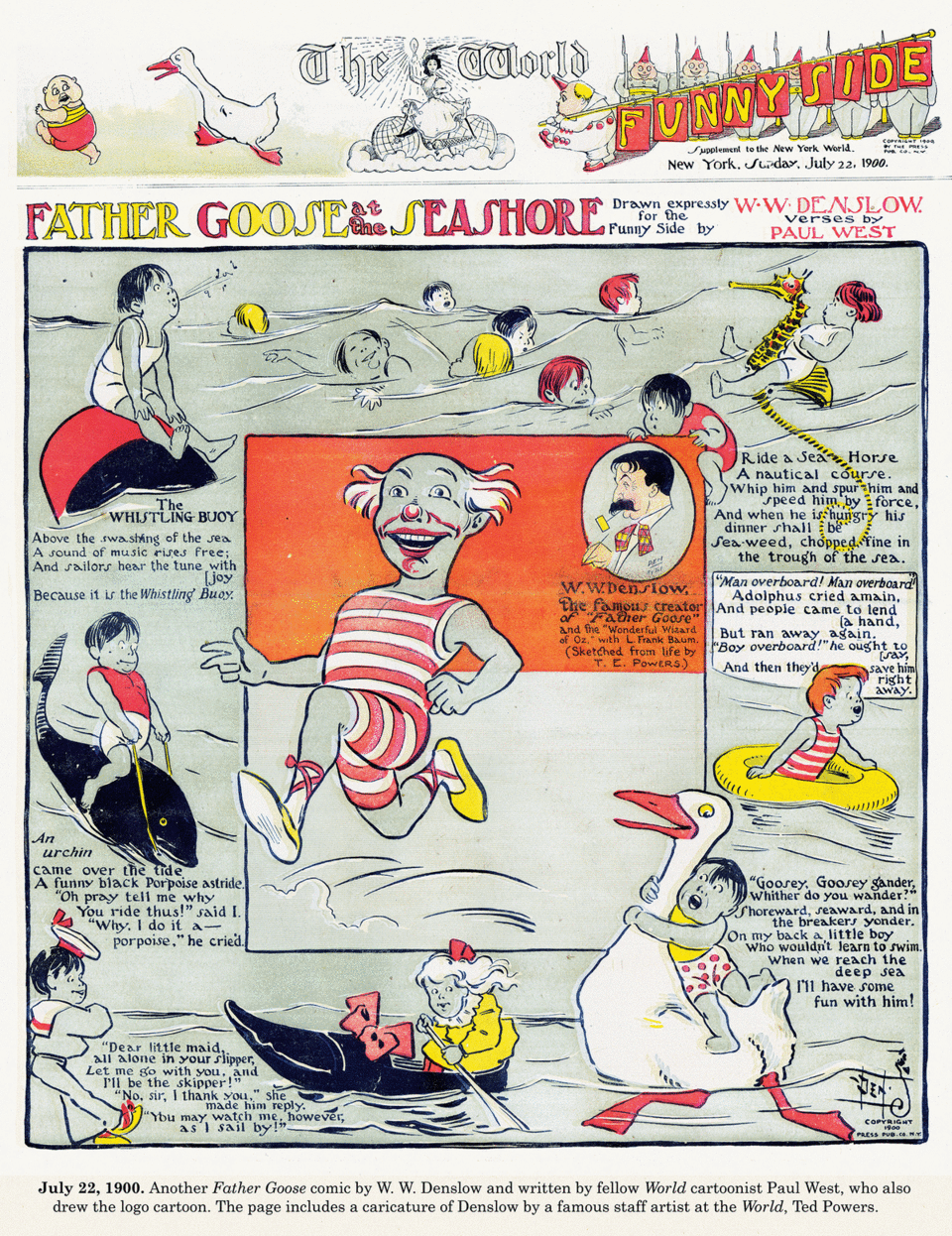
Father Goose at the Seashore, New York World, July 1900

He continued in this vein for the McClure’s comic supplement with Billy Bounce. This initially included a continuous narrative from one week to the next, the first comic page to do so — thus paving the way for modern comic strip narratives. Billy Bounce ran from 1901 to 1906, however Denslow lost interest in it early on and he ended his contributions in 1902.

In 1901, he published Denslow's Mother Goose, being the old familiar rhymes and jingles of Mother Goose. In this book he illustrated the Mother Goose rhymes but felt free to edit some to remove any elements that might be disturbing to young children. For example, for There Was an Old Woman Who Lived in a Shoe, his version has her kissing the children before putting them to bed rather than beating them. However, most of the rhymes he selected were ostensibly sweet or playful and required no such editing. In a further attempt to appeal to young children, he used simpler drawings than in Father Goose with bolder lines and elimination of the box frame. Furthermore, his illustrations often included details that suggested a narrative of his own — not evident from the text. For example, "He carefully placed bottles of catsup and pepper sauce on the table to show how the Man in the Moon 'burnt his mouth eating cold pease porridge' ". Also the moon which he left is labeled "TO LET".

After Mother Goose was published, Mother Goose themes and characters were added to the Billy Bounce newspaper comic, and some of the characters such as the Pieman in the Simple Simon rhyme became recurrent characters.

In 1903 and 1904, Denslow prepared a series of pamphlets, many of which were based on Mother Goose rhymes, titled: Denslow's Picture Book Series for Children, and Denslow's New Series of Picture Books, respectively. There were a total of 18 pamphlets, each 16 pages (including front and back covers); for example: Denslow's Humpty Dumpty, Denslow's Little Red Riding Hood, and Denslow's Simple Simon, etc.

Denslow's Mother Goose, 1901
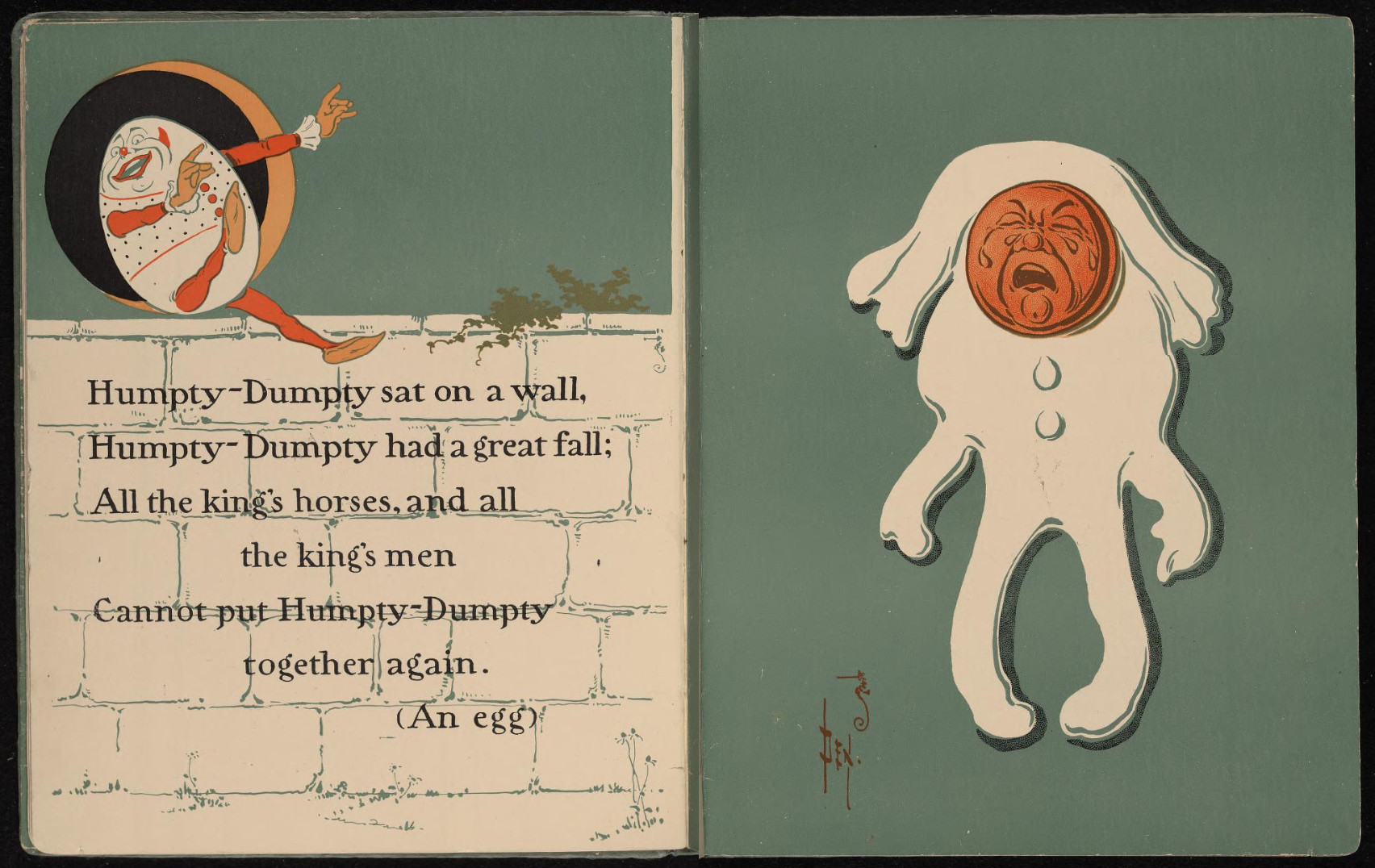

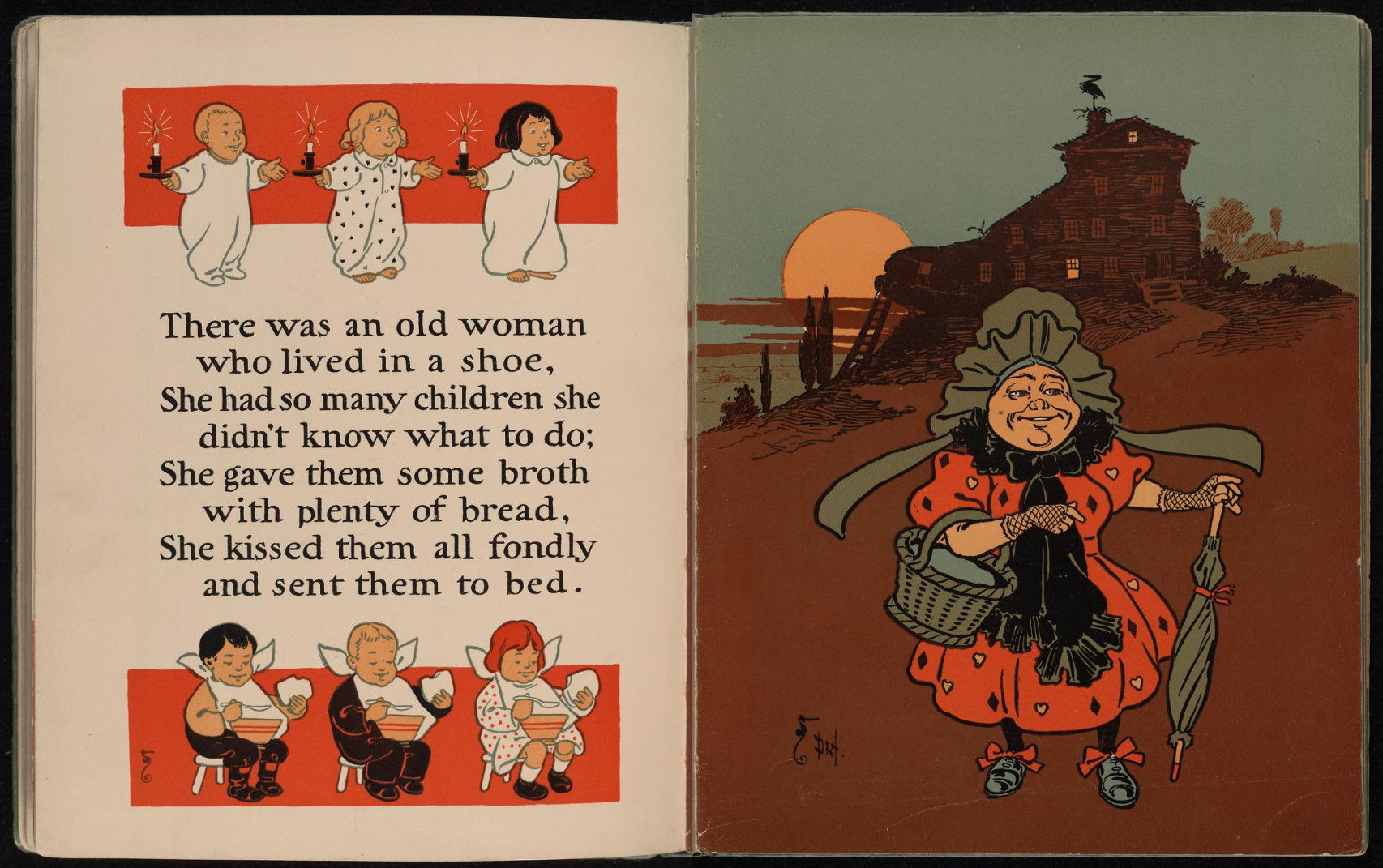

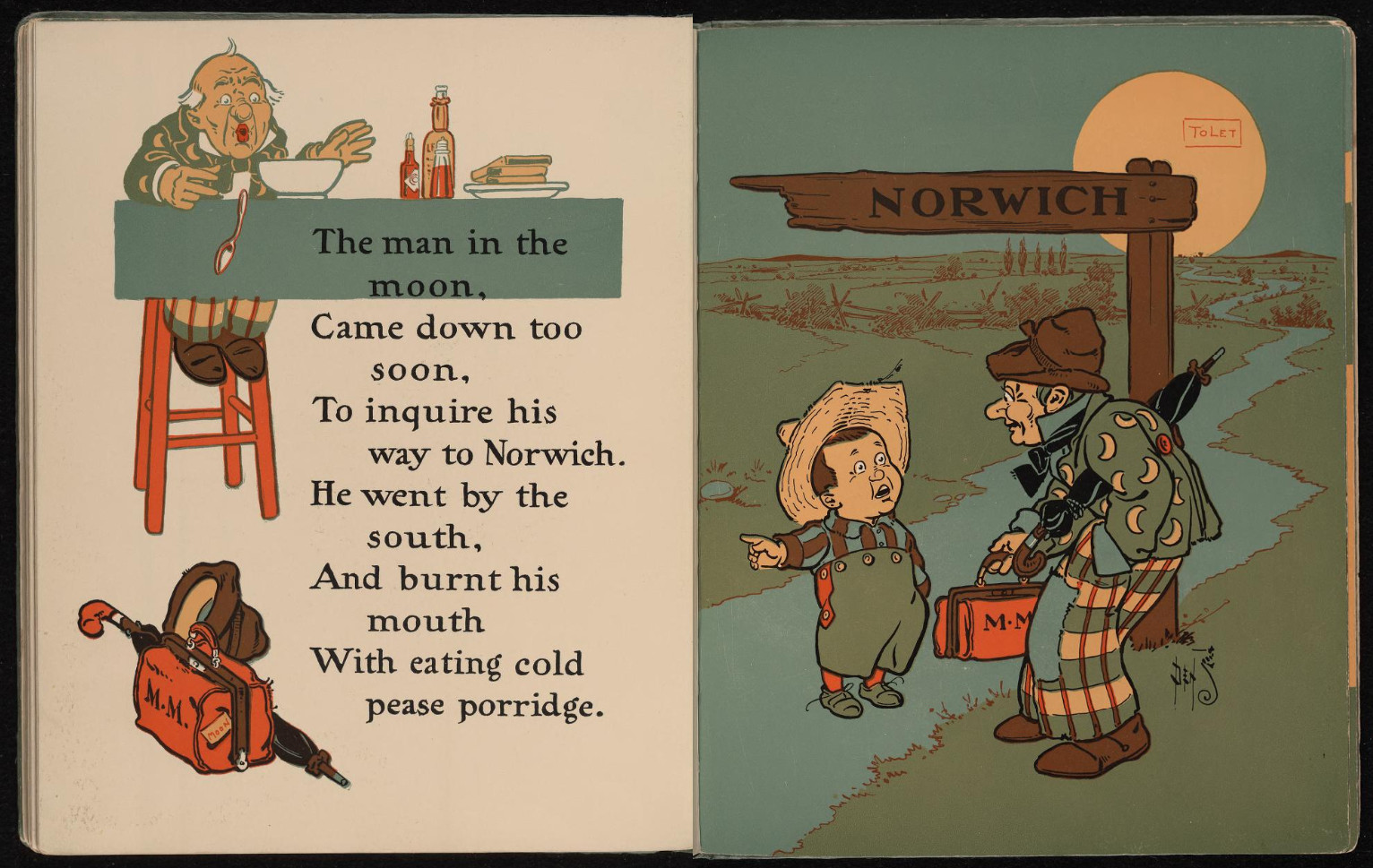
