= Barni Ahmed Qaasim =

Somali multimedia artist and filmmaker

Barni Ahmed Qaasim بارني أحمد قاسم
- Born: Somalia
- Occupations: multimedia artist and filmmaker

Barni Ahmed Qaasim (Somali: Barni Axmed Qaasim, Arabic: بارني أحمد قاسم) is a Somali multimedia artist and filmmaker. She has a BA in political science, with a minor in Interdisciplinary Arts and a Masters of Arts in Broadcasting. Her work includes photo and video journalism, music videos and documentary film. From 2004 to 2009, Qaasim was a member of Third World Majority, an Oakland, California-based media collective, for which she later served as Director of Production. Between 2008 and 2012, she served as an instructor with Seventh Native American Generation (SNAG) magazine, teaching youngsters skills in video production. Qaasim's first documentary, A Little Rebirth, was centered on her Somali community and won a Somali Association of Arizona award. She also directed and produced Catching Babies, a feature-length documentary on midwifery on the United States/Mexico border. The film was awarded the Excellence in Documenting Women's Health prize from Puente a la Salud in 2013. Additionally, Qaasim was an Associate Producer for the documentary Under Arpaio by J. M. Aragón of Pan Left Productions, which won the 2012 Best of Arizona Award at the Arizona International Film Festival and was chosen for the Sundance Institute's Creative Change Artists Retreat. She was likewise an Assistant Editor on Into the Current, a documentary directed by Jeanne Hallacy that was selected for the Lucerne International Film Festival and One World International Human Rights Film Festival. Presently, Qaasim is a board member of the Somali Association of Arizona, an organization to which she has contributed photography, video and graphic design skills since joining in 2006. She is also a member of Puente and serves as a mentor for the Puente Visión youth media collective.
