= Barni, Himachal Pradesh =

Coordinates: 31°31′11″N 76°28′02″E

Barni (also known as Barhni) is a small village located in the Baliah Panchayat of Barsar Tehsil, Hamirpur district, Himachal Pradesh, India. It is situated approximately 35 km from the district headquarters, Hamirpur, with Barsar serving as the sub-district headquarters for Barni.

== Geography ==
Barni village spans a total geographical area of 39.96 hectares.

== Demographics ==
According to the 2011 Census of India, Barni has a total population of 251 individuals, comprising 110 males and 141 females. The village has 52 households. The child population (age 0–6 years) stands at 32, accounting for 12.75% of the total population. The sex ratio is notably high at 1,282 females per 1,000 males, surpassing the Himachal Pradesh state average of 972. The child sex ratio is 1,286 females per 1,000 males, also higher than the state average of 909.

== Literacy ==
Barni exhibits a high literacy rate of 91.78%, which is above the Himachal Pradesh state average of 82.80%. Male literacy is at 98.96%, while female literacy stands at 86.18%.

== Administration ==
As per the Constitution of India and the Panchayati Raj Act, Barni is administered by a sarpanch, who is an elected representative of the village. The village is part of the Baliah Panchayat and falls under the Barsar Vidhan Sabha constituency and the Hamirpur Lok Sabha constituency.

== Economy ==
The primary occupation in Barni is agriculture. Out of the total working population of 118, 60 individuals are cultivators (owners or co-owners), while 5 are marginal workers. The majority of the workforce is engaged in agriculture-related activities.

== Community and social structure ==
Barni has a significant Scheduled Caste (SC) population, comprising 16.33% of the total population. There are no Scheduled Tribe (ST) residents in the village.

== Connectivity ==
Barni is well-connected by public and private bus services. The nearest railway station is located within a 10 km radius, facilitating easy access to nearby towns and cities.

== Shivalik foothills ==
Barni is a serene village nestled in the Hamirpur district of Himachal Pradesh, a region often referred to as 'Veerbhumi' due to its high density of military veterans. Situated within the Shivalik foothills, Barni represents the heart of rural Himachal, balancing a peaceful agrarian lifestyle with proximity to the state's major educational and administrative center in Hamirpur city.

== Nearby villages ==
Adjacent villages to Barni include:

- Ghamarwin
- Harma
- Baroli
- Bhakreri
- Birswin
- Rahil
- Kaswar
- Baggi
- Lohane
- Kowa
