= W. W. Denslow =

American illustrator and caricaturist (1856–1915)

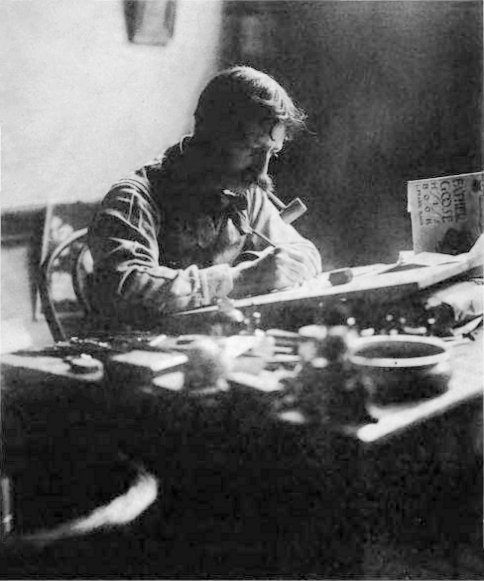
- Denslow in 1900
- Born: William Wallace Denslow; May 5, 1856; Philadelphia, Pennsylvania, U.S.
- Died: March 29, 1915 (aged 58); New York City, U.S.
- Resting place: Kensico Cemetery
- Education: National Academy of Design; Cooper Union
- Known for: Illustration
- Notable work: The Wonderful Wizard of Oz collaborations with L. Frank Baum

William Wallace Denslow (/ˈdɛnsloʊ/; May 5, 1856 – March 29, 1915) was an American illustrator and caricaturist, best known for his work in collaboration with author L. Frank Baum, especially his illustrations of The Wonderful Wizard of Oz. Denslow was an editorial cartoonist with a strong interest in politics, which has fueled political interpretations of The Wonderful Wizard of Oz.

== Biography ==
Born in Philadelphia to a tobacco wholesaler, Denslow spent brief periods at the National Academy of Design and the Cooper Union in New York, but was largely self-educated and self-trained. In the 1880s, he traveled about the United States as an artist and newspaper reporter; he came to Chicago for the World's Columbian Exposition in 1893, and chose to stay. Denslow acquired his earliest reputation as a poster artist; he also designed books and bookplates, and was the first artist invited to work at the Roycroft Press.

Denslow may have met Baum at the Chicago Press Club, where both men were members. Besides The Wonderful Wizard of Oz, Denslow also illustrated Baum's books By the Candelabra's Glare, Father Goose: His Book, and Dot and Tot of Merryland. Baum and Denslow held the copyrights to most of these works jointly.

After Denslow quarreled with Baum over royalty shares from the 1902 stage adaptation of The Wizard of Oz, for which Baum wrote the script and Denslow designed the sets and costumes, Baum determined not to work with him again. (As co-copyright-holder, Denslow demanded an equal share in royalties with Baum and composer Paul Tietjens.) Denslow illustrated an edition of traditional nursery rhymes titled Denslow's Mother Goose (1901), along with Denslow's Night Before Christmas (1902) and the 18-volume Denslow's Picture Books series (1903–04). He also used his copyright to the art of the Baum books to create newspaper comic strips featuring Father Goose and the Scarecrow and Tin Woodman during the first decade of the twentieth century. The strip, titled Denslow's Scarecrow and [the] Tin Man, was intended to promote a forthcoming sequel he was writing. The strip ran concurrently with Queer Visitors from the Marvelous Land of Oz. He also created the comic strip Billy Bounce, notable as one of the earliest comic strips in which the protagonist has some manner of super powers.

Denslow used his royalties from the Oz works to rent, and later buy Bluck's Island, Bermuda in 1904, which he grandly announced in The North American as "King Denslow I." He then teamed with writer Paul West on the children's novel The Pearl and the Pumpkin and its stage adaptation. These did not repeat his success with Oz, and Denslow was unable to keep the property.

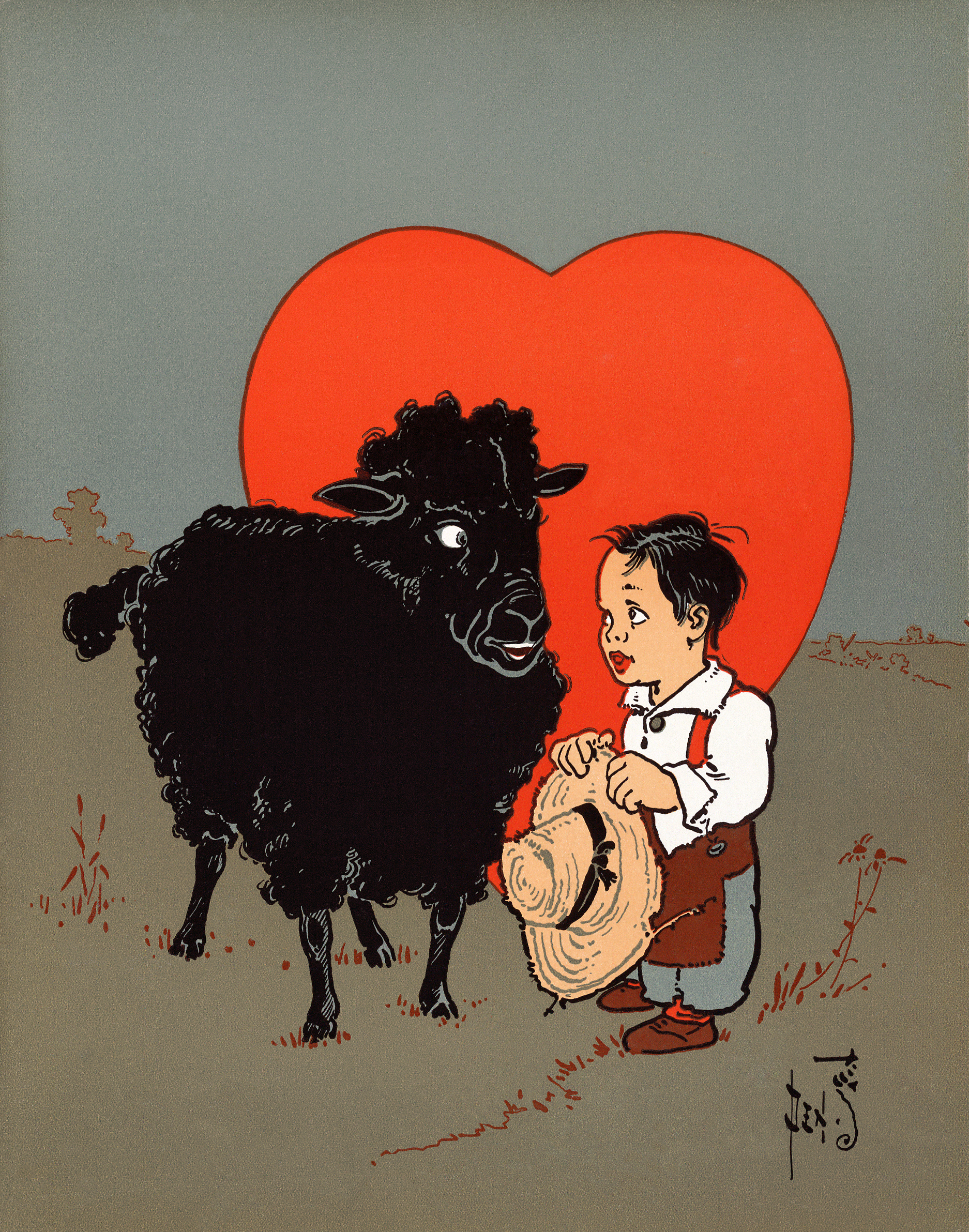
The Black Sheep, from a 1901 edition of Mother Goose

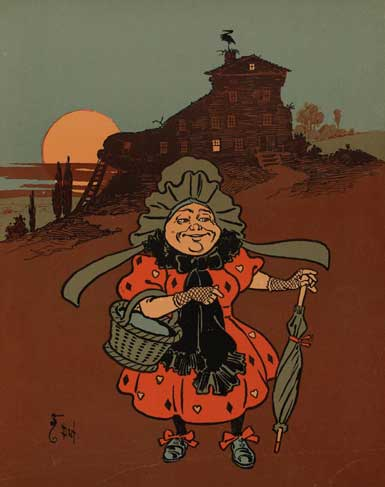
Denslow's illustration for "There was an Old Woman Who Lived in a Shoe", from a 1901 edition of Mother Goose

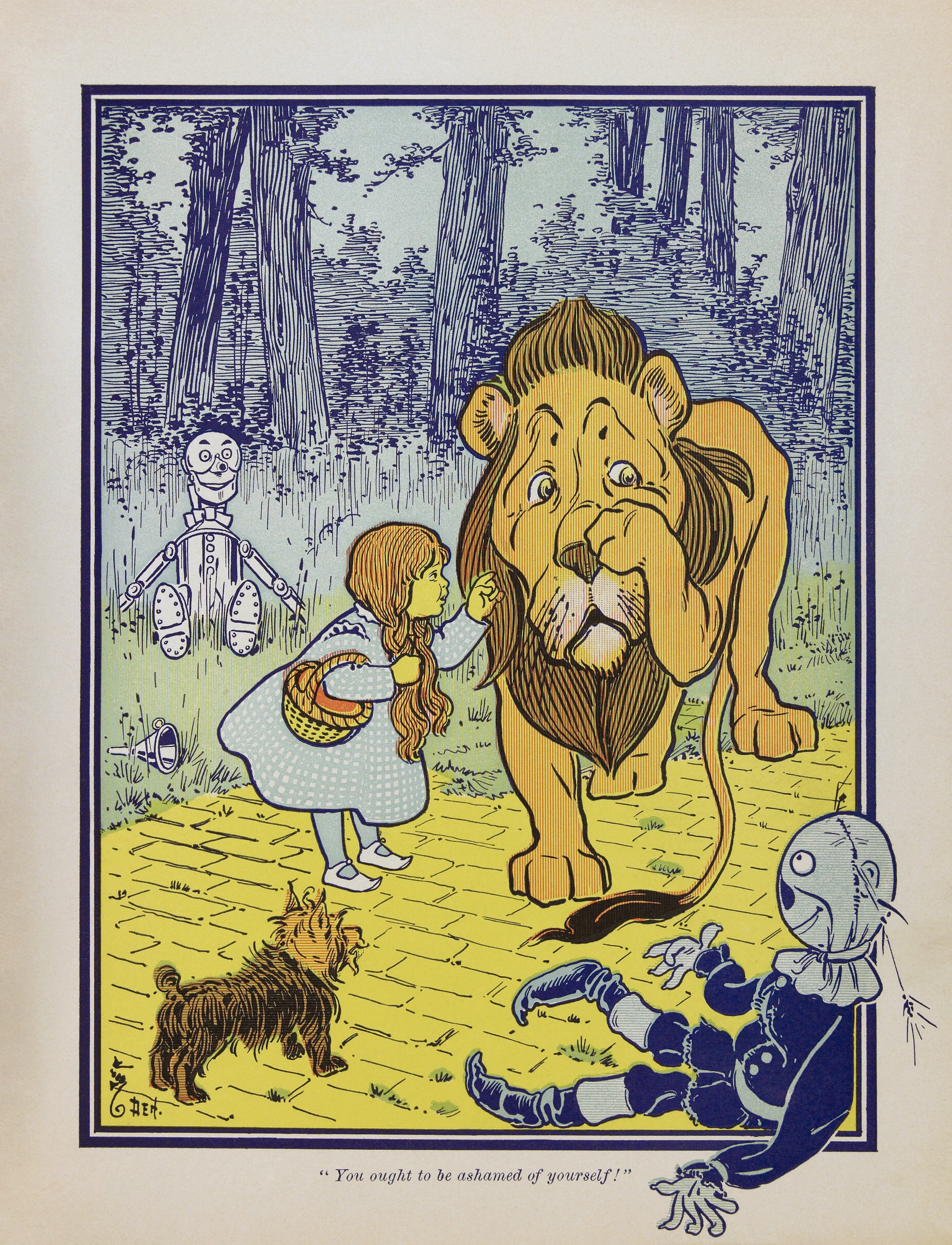
Dorothy meets the Cowardly Lion, from the first edition of The Wonderful Wizard of Oz

== Personal life ==
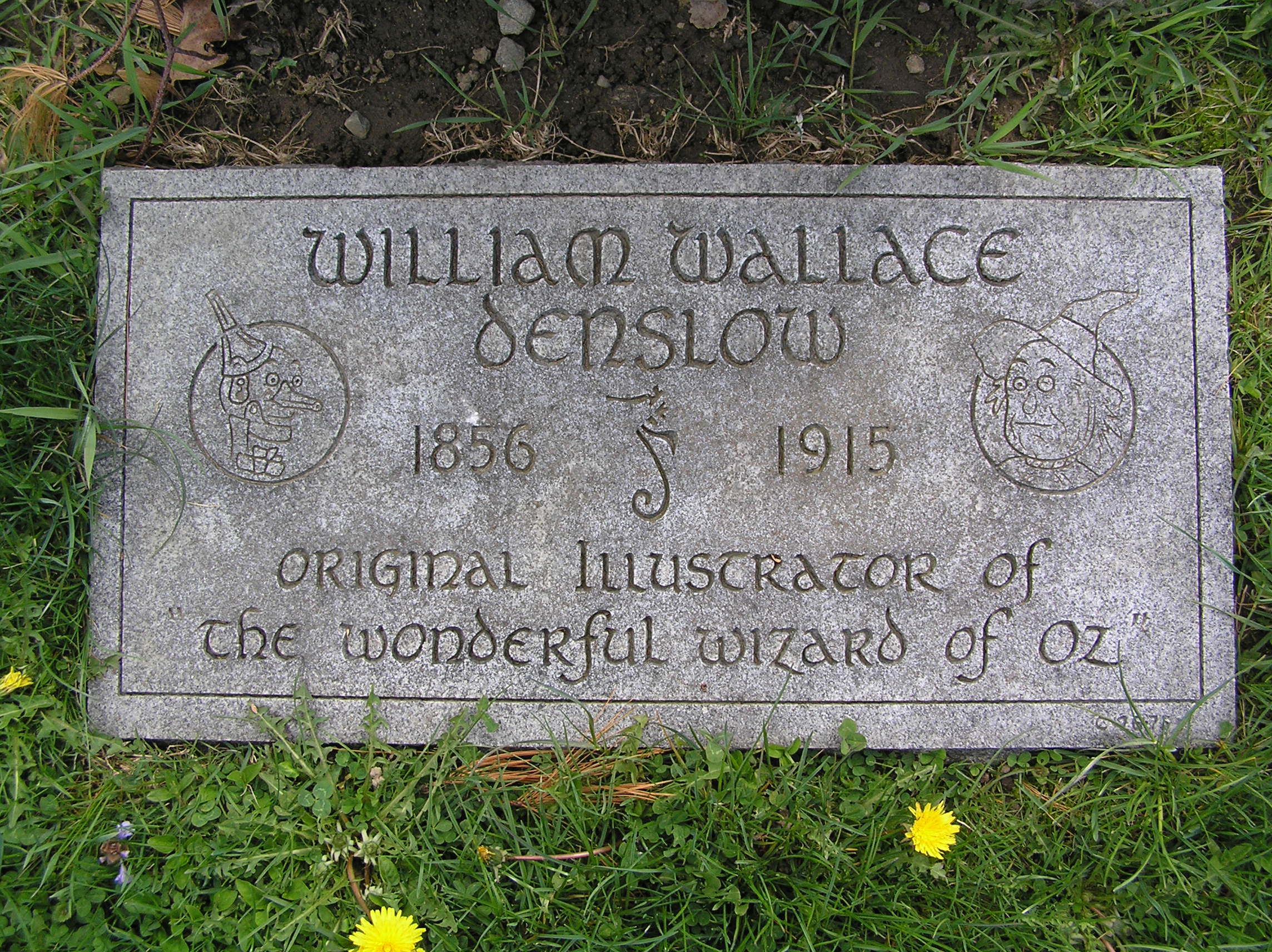
The footstone of William Wallace Denslow in Kensico Cemetery, featuring his seahorse insignia and images of the Scarecrow and Tin Woodman

Denslow had three wives and three divorces in his lifetime. His first wife, Annie McCartney (née, Anna M. Lowe, 1856–1908) married him in 1882 and gave birth to his only child, a son, the following year. The couple were already separated, however, and Denslow never saw his son. They finally divorced in 1896, freeing her to marry the man she lived with for five months. That same day, February 20, 1896, Denslow married Anne Holden Denslow, the daughter of Martha Holden, writer. The marriage did not last long either. Anne filed for divorce in September 1903, alleging that he told her in June 1901 that he did not love her and henceforth declined to live with her. In less than a month she married a young artist, their friend, Lawrence Mazzanovich, and left with him for Paris. Denslow then married his third wife, Mrs. Frances G. Doolittle December 24. Frances left him in 1906 and they finally divorced in 1911. He changed his will in 1914, leaving his estate to a fourth woman.

== Death ==
Denslow died on March 29, 1915, in the Knickerbocker Hospital, New York City of pneumonia.

He was buried in Kensico Cemetery. A cenotaph exists in Grove Street Cemetery, on the more elaborate family stone.

== Legacy ==
In 2018, "The Lost Art of Oz" project was initiated to locate and catalogue the surviving original artwork John R. Neill, W. W. Denslow, Frank Kramer, Richard 'Dirk' Gringhuis and Dick Martin created to illustrate the Oz book series.
