= Barney (British TV series) =

- Created by: Lisa Kopper (characters); Shirley-Anne Lewis (idea)
- Written by: Peter Bonnici
- Directed by: Reg Lodge; Robert Balser
- Voices of: Tim Brooke-Taylor; Harry Enfield; Jan Ravens; Enn Reitel
- Narrated by: Enn Reitel
- Composers: Joanna Wyatt; Colin Frechter
- Country of origin: United Kingdom
- Original language: English (UK)
- No. of episodes: 13

Production
- Executive producer: David Hamilton
- Producer: John Coates
- Editors: Taylor Grant; José Pallejá
- Running time: 5 minutes
- Production company: Barney Entertainments Limited (Note: Animation production by TVC London (Christmas special) and Pegbar Productions, S.A. Spain (full series))

Original release
- Network: BBC One
- Release: 27 December 1988 – 26 April 1989

Barney is a British animated television series that aired on BBC One from 27 December 1988 to 26 April 1989. It also aired on Cartoon Network as part of their anthology series for younger children called Small World in the United States and Latin America.

== Characters and Voice Cast (UK) ==
- Barney (voiced by Tim Brooke-Taylor) – A clumsy yet good-natured Old English Sheepdog. He has many adventures with his best friend, Roger and constantly looks for fame and fortune.
- Roger (voiced by Harry Enfield): A mischievous mouse with blonde hair who lives on the top of Barney's head inside his hair.
- Desmond (voiced by Harry Enfield) – An Afghan Hound with sunglasses whose voice resembles that of Michael Caine, who serves as head of the TV house. Often, he shows to be not as tolerant with Barney as his other friends.
- Corneila (voiced by Jan Ravens) – A Chihuahua who sometimes is not very keen on Barney's attitude, but is his neighbour and closest friend.
- Francine (voiced by Jan Ravens) – A friendly Irish Setter who helps Barney on his quest for stardom.
- Mr Prophet (voiced by Enn Reitel) – An English Springer Spaniel who sometimes has a depressed attitude but is a good friend of Barney.
- Lost and Found (voices uncredited) – Two Dalmatian puppies who were found on Christmas Eve one year by Barney, and were given to a delighted Mr Prophet as a Christmas present.

== Episodes ==
No.	Title	Original release date	Prod. code
1	"Barney's Christmas Surprise"	21 December 1988 (production); 27 December 1988 (TV)	1
Two puppies Lost and Found turn up at Barney's doorstep and become the best Christmas present for Mr Prophet. This episode has a song played by Carl Wayne called "Love Your Dog".
2	"Barney Gets into Mischief"	8 February 1989	2
Barney and his friends go to the fair, but Barney runs into trouble with a hot air balloon.
3	"Barney's Hungry Day"	15 February 1989	3
Barney likes nothing more than a delicious meal and goes on a diet. But Roger shows him the bathroom scales are broken when he gets on them. He gets a nasty shock.
4	"Barney's Treasure Hunt"	22 February 1989	4
Barney's attempts at gardening ruin the garden, while Roger works on his own planting.
5	"Barney's Forgotten Birthday"	1 March 1989	5
Barney thinks everyone's forgotten his birthday, until Roger gives him a real surprise.
6	"Barney Nabs a Crook"	8 March 1989	6
Barney and Roger blame each other for an empty fridge, but a detective reveals Barney ate all the food sleepwalking.
7	"Barney's Big Spring Clean"	15 March 1989	8
Barney does spring cleaning in his house, but ends up cleaning Roger's home instead.
8	"Barney's TV Act"	22 March 1989	7
Barney goes to London to become a TV star, but Roger becomes the star instead.
9	"Barney the TV Director"	29 March 1989	9
Barney wants to be involved in a TV Show at Corneila's house, but his interruptions anger Desmond.
10	"Barney's Winter Holiday"	5 April 1989	10
Skiing down the slopes sounds like bliss, but not to Barney, who finds himself being rescued by Mitzi, the big St Bernard and they win a prize.
11	"Barney Goes to the Seaside"	12 April 1989	11
On a trip to the seaside, Barney and his friends annoy each other and quickly make up.
12	"Barney Gets a Visitor"	19 April 1989	12
Byron pays a visit to Barney, but Byron eats him out of house and home. Byron has got to go...... he is too fond of Barney's biscuits. So Roger hatches a plan....
13	"Barney on TV"	26 April 1989	13
Barney is all excited as he prepares for his first television job in the TV Studio as a stage assistant which proves to be exhausting.

== Home media ==
On 6 November 1989, BBC Video released a single video cassette titled "Barney Gets Into Mischief", featuring all episodes except for the Christmas Special. Castle Music Ltd. later released another VHS cassette, titled "Barney: The Dog with Stars in His Eyes" on 1 June 1999, which included all thirteen episodes.

On 22 April 2002, Right Entertainment and Universal Pictures Video released another tape also titled "Barney Gets into Mischief and other stories", which consisted of the first eight episodes, excluding the Christmas Special. This release was also released on DVD in August 2004, and the two companies later released the whole series on DVD in 2006.

=== Australian VHS release ===
Roadshow Entertainment released "Barney: The Dog with Stars in his Eyes" on VHS on 31 October 2000, containing all thirteen episodes.
