= Merryland (Oz) =

Fictional region created by L. Frank Baum

- The Oz series location
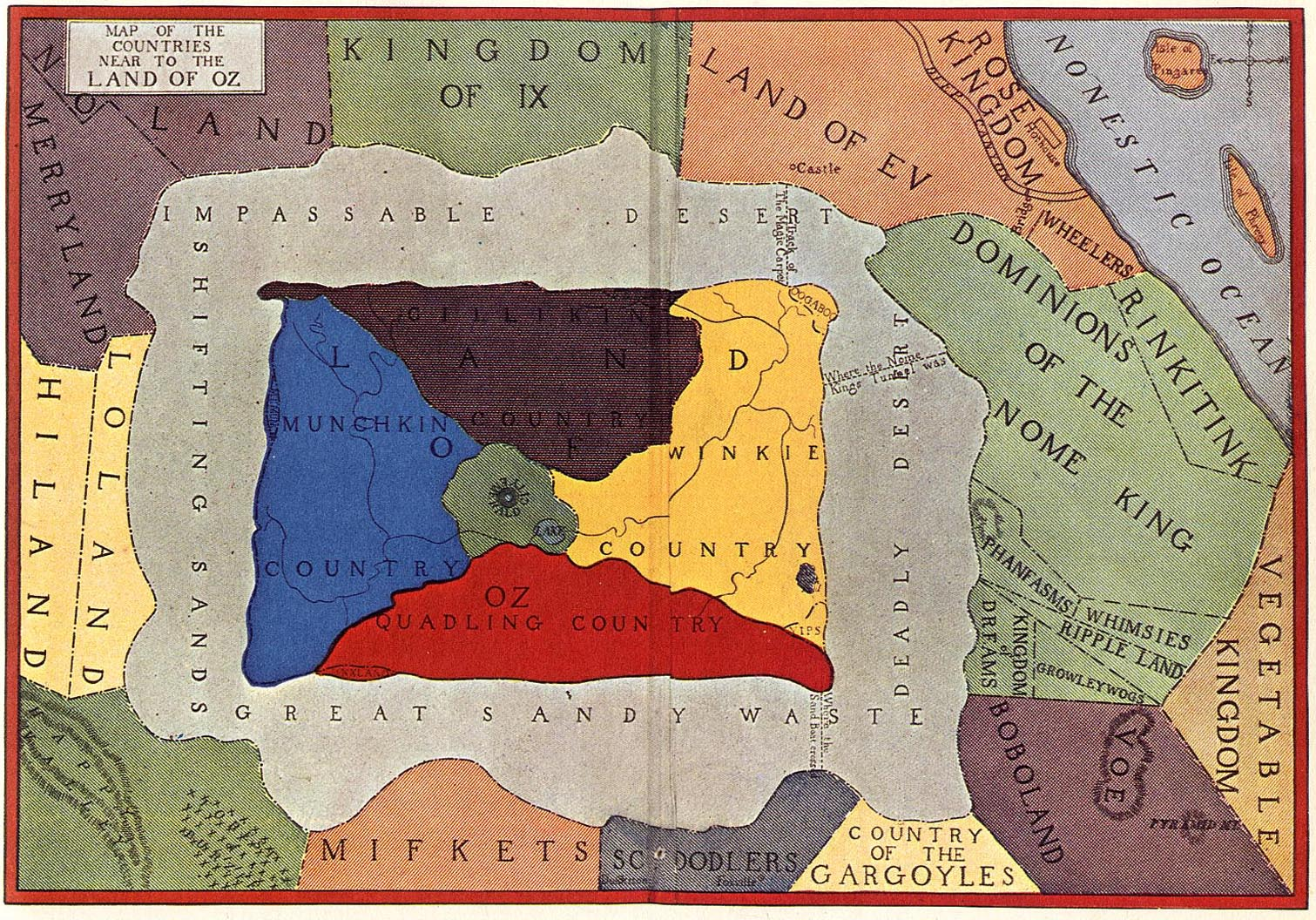
- Merryland is near Noland
- First appearance: Dot and Tot of Merryland
- Created by: L. Frank Baum
- Genre: Children's fantasy

In-universe information
- Type: Fairy country
- Ruled by: Queen Dolly
- Location: Nonestica

Merryland is a fictional region neighboring the Land of Oz, created by author L. Frank Baum. It is bordered by Noland and the twin kingdoms of Hiland and Loland.

== History ==
Merryland is the setting of the 1901 children's novel Dot and Tot of Merryland.

Before Dot and Tot arrived, nobody had ever visited Merryland. Merryland has seven valleys and is ruled by Queen Dolly.

== Reception ==
In Oz and Beyond: The Fantasy World of L. Frank Baum, Michael O. Riley says that Dot and Tot of Merryland "is, in fact, one of Baum's weakest books, yet Merryland is one of his most charming, serene, and finished imaginary countries. The problem is one of balance: the fantasy world is strong but the story is not, and both elements too often seem to exist independently of each other."

== Points of interest ==
The locations of Merryland are listed in order of appearance:

- Stony Vale - An area at the border of Merryland that is guarded by the Watch-Dog of Merryland and serves as the entrance to Merryland.
- Valley of Clowns - The first valley which is inhabited by clowns that wear a variety of costumes. The clowns here are experts at tumbling and juggling.
- Valley of Bonbons - The second valley which is inhabited by candy people and everything is also made of candy.
- Valley of Babies - The third valley which is inhabited by hapless babies that are attended to by Storks.
- Valley of Dolls - The fourth valley that is home to Queen Dolly. It is surrounded by a high wall which runs along a riverbank and the gate is guarded by wooden soldiers. The inhabitants resemble the different types of dolls ranging from rag dolls, wax dolls, wooden dolls, china dolls, bisque dolls, corncob dolls, rubber dolls, and papier-mâchê dolls. All of the dolls there are stuffed with saw dust which is the only thing they can eat.
- Valley of Pussycats - The fifth valley where its inhabitants are cats of different colors and breeds.
- Valley of Wind-Up Toys - The sixth valley where a tall forest separates the valley from the river. The inhabitants are wind-up toys who are constantly winding down.
- Valley of Lost Things - The seventh and final valley that is uninhabited and seldom visited. Anything outside of Merryland that is lost ends up here.

== Known inhabitants ==
- Queen Dolly - A beautiful wax doll who is the ruler of Merryland and resides in the Valley of Dolls.
- Candy Man - A candy person with marshmallow skin and stick candy bones who resides in the Valley of Bonbons.
- Flippityflop - A richly-dressed clown prince with a sweet and pleasant voice who is the ruler of the Valley of Clowns.
- King Felis - A large Maltese Cat who is the ruler of the Valley of Cats.
- Mr. Split - A wooden man who is the keeper of the Valley of Wind-Up Toys. He is always running around constantly winding up the wind-up toys.
- Watch-Dog of Merryland - A hairy old man who guards the Stony Vale.
