= Dot and Tot of Merryland =

1901 novel by L. Frank Baum

- First edition
- Author: L. Frank Baum
- Illustrator: W.W. Denslow
- Language: English
- Genre: Children's novel
- Publisher: Geo. M. Hill
- Publication date: 1901
- Publication place: United States
- Media type: Print (hardback)
- OCLC: 2462654

Dot and Tot of Merryland is a 1901 novel by L. Frank Baum. After Baum wrote The Wonderful Wizard of Oz, he wrote this story about the adventures of a little girl named Dot and a little boy named Tot in a land reached by floating on a river that flowed through a tunnel. The land was called Merryland and was split into seven valleys. The book was illustrated by artist W. W. Denslow. He had illustrated three previous Baum books that were advertised in Dot and Tot, Father Goose: His Book, The Songs of Father Goose (a companion book with music by Alberta N. Hall), as well as The Wonderful Wizard of Oz.

Unlike The Wonderful Wizard of Oz, Dot and Tot of Merryland contained no tipped in color plates, but was filled with colored text illustrations. There were four full page pictures. The book is the last Baum book that was illustrated by W. W. Denslow.

== Publishers ==
Dot and Tot of Merryland was first published by the Geo. M. Hill company of Chicago in 1901. The company went bankrupt in 1902; and, following a series of exchanges, the rights and plates were acquired by the Bobbs-Merrill Company which reissued the book. There were several Bobbs-Merrill printings from 1904 to 1920.

The first edition was favorably reviewed in many in newspapers from all around the United States. For example, the Detroit Free Press published a four column article about it that included a long excerpt (authorized by the publisher) with three of Denslow's illustrations. Nevertheless, it met with very little commercial success, despite the popularity of The Wonderful Wizard of Oz. One possible cause for the disappointing sales was the absence of the "frantic energy" of their previous books, which was more appealing to children.

== Synopsis ==
Evangeline "Dot" Freeland is sent to her rich father's country estate Roselawn for her health. She soon meets the gardener's son "Tot" Thompson, who becomes her friend and playmate.

One day, they have a picnic and sit in a boat they find by the river, which gets away and takes them to a passage in a cliff face that brings them to the magical country of Merryland. Watch-Dog of Merryland forbids them to enter but does not try to stop them.

Merryland has seven valleys, arranged in a circular pattern connected by a river running through them. Dot and Tot use their boat to visit each valley in succession.

- The first valley is populated by clowns and run by Prince Flippityflop. The clowns practice their routines on the roofs of their homes. Each year, one clown is sent from Merryland to work in a circus.
- The second is a land in which everything—including the people—is entirely made of candy. This is where they meet a candy man, who must constantly dust himself with powdered sugar so he won't stick to things, and who, like the other candy people, has no teeth. Tot bites off the candy man's thumb and two fingers but he doesn't mind. The candy man and a candy woman have a young daughter who is cared for by their chocolate maid, Aunt Lowney.
- The third valley is where babies grow from blossoms before storks deliver them to their parents. The baby blossoms float down from the sky and the storks feed them with milk drawn from a fountain of milk while they sing lullabies.
- The fourth valley is populated by living dolls and is also the home of the Queen of Merryland, a large wax doll who makes Dot and Tot her adopted children and crowns them Princess and Prince of Merryland.

The queen takes the children out of the palace to see the city in horse drawn carriages (the horses are standing on a platform that actually runs on wheels). The streets are quite until the queen waves her wand around her head three times. Suddenly the sleeping dolls wake up and pour into the street. Dot says she does not understand how she did that. The queen responds, "No, I suppose not" and reveals that she is a fairy. The queen plays her music box and the dolls dance to the music in an amusing way. Then she uses her wand to make them stop dancing, return home, and go to sleep.

Dot and Tot have a day of running the valley when the queen leaves to give Watch-Dog new orders. At Dot's request, the dolls are left awake so she can play with them. However, the dolls soon become angry because Dot can't play the music box for them — the queen has the key. They stage an animated rebellion that continues until the queen returns.

The next day, Dot and Tot join the queen to see the remaining three valleys.

- The fifth valley is populated entirely by cats and is ruled by a Maltese cat named King Felis. Cats of every breed live in numbered houses. King Felis lives in number one. The cats sleep most of the day but spring on to the roofs of their houses to "sing" (or caterwaul) at night.
- The sixth valley is run by Mr. Split who runs around to make sure all the wind-up toys stay wound up. He is split in half so that he can work twice as fast. The queen and children meet Mr. Left Split, who only speaks the left parts of the words in his sentences, as well as Mr. Right Split, who only speaks the right parts.

The final valley is the Valley of Lost Things, where every lost item goes. Tot finds a doll he'd lost and is allowed to take it with him. The Queen decides to allow Dot and Tot to travel onward, which will take them back to Roselawn, but she will close the way to Merryland forever.

Returning to the river, Dot is found by her father who notices that she no longer looks sickly. Tot deduces that the Queen of Merryland—who was either interrupted or forgot to answer when asked her name—must be named "Dolly."

== Illustrations ==
Denslow biographers, Greene and Hearn, noted that he was sensitive to previous criticisms that he could not draw a "child-like child" and so took particular care in picturing Dot and Tot. "The drawing is precise in every detail to depict child-like and attractive children". They described Denslow’s drawings as follows:

Dot and Tot is a tightly planned work of art. Instead of color plates which might have interrupted the fluid movement from page to page, Denslow had the text illustrations printed in black line supported with cocoa brown and vermilion. This elegant combination of colors perfectly complements the sensuous, simplified forms appearing in profusion throughout the book.

— Greene and Hearn (1976)

His drawing were signed "Den" adjacent to a stylized seahorse, a mark which he had adopted early in his career.

The front cover of the first edition depicts the Doll Queen with gilt hair. The end papers include an illustration of the radiant queen and her pewter marching band. The colors and whimsical style of the title page illustration are typical of the interior illustrations. Variations in the color layout were used in subsequent editions. One of the most notable is the 1920 Bobbs-Merrill edition with a clown on the cover. The interior illustrations of this edition were done only in olive green and black. The end papers are blank.

While Green and Hearn praised the illustrations, Baum commentator, Michael O. Riley, found Denslow's use of just three colors created "a feeling of monotony". In his opinion, there was greater separation between the text and illustrations than in their previous collaborations, which he attributed to their deteriorating relationship.

== Verses and songs ==
Dot and Tot contains verses and rhyming songs in several chapters. The style of these varied by chapter. The songs in the clown chapter were nonsensical, for example:

Little Tommy Harris
Made a trip to Paris.
There he went within a tent,
Saw a convex firmament;
Then he peered within a booth,
Saw a shark without a tooth,
Heard a dumb man sing and chant,
Saw a crimson elephant. ...

— Baum and Denslow (1991)

The songs in the baby chapter were lullabies; while important pronouncements in doll chapters, such as the coronation of Dot and Tot as Princess and Prince of Merryland, were rendered in verse .

== Commentary ==
Michael O. Riley (Baum scholar and professor of children's literature) wrote a book-length commentary, Oz and Beyond: the fantasy world of L. Frank Baum, exploring how Baum’s life experience influenced his writing. It was promoted as the first comprehensive look at all of Baum’s fantasies, and included an 11-page discussion of Dot and Tot. He postulated that this book in particular was influenced by his idyllic childhood spent at the family's estate near Syracuse, New York that his mother called Rose Lawn because of its extensive rose gardens. The first chapter of the book is called Roselawn, the name of Dot and Tot's home. Riley quoted a full paragraph from the book describing the beauty of Roselawn. It begins, "The cool but sun-kissed mansion seemed delightful after the stuffy, formal city house". In this book, Baum took particular care not to frighten young children. Dot and Tot are never in serious danger so there is little drama. "The mood of the book reflects that secure and idyllic time" in Baum’s life.

Dot and Tot see many wonderful and happy scenes while touring Merryland. However the tour ends in the Valley of Lost Things, which is strange and still, and filled with heaps of lost items that will never be returned. Riley ends his discussion with the comment: "The Valley of was a strange and sad image with which to end the book; one wonders if it might also be the place of Baum’s own lost youth".

As Dot and Tot leave Merryland, they hear the falling rocks that close the portal forever. Riley suggests that Baum sealed off Merryland because the "problems of encroaching civilization affected him greatly". He was concerned that the continued development of the western United States was destroying its beauty and disrupting its simple well-ordered way of life. As originally described, Merryland seemed to be a part of America which the children were able to enter by way of a secret cave. According to Riley, as Baum became more disenchanted with unregulated development, he moved the Land of Oz to its own continent, a kind of "heaven, journey’s end and the reward for those truly worthy".. The endpaper for Tik Tok of Oz has a map of Oz with Merryland and the numerous other fairyland countries that he had invented placed around it.

As noted, the Queen of Merryland discloses to Dot that she is a fairy with magical powers. Baum considered her a true fairy even though she did not fit the European model. Riley quotes Baum as saying that just as other countries had fairy tales the United States should have them as well. Baum followed up on this conviction in subsequent books particularly in American Fairy Tales and The Master Key: An Electrical Fairy Tale. The latter could also be classified as science fiction.

Barbara S. Koelle, frequent contributor to The Baum Bugle, wrote an article about Dot and Tot for the centenary issue published in 2001. She praised the writing style as appropriate for younger children but noted an issue of racial and class stereotyping. Some stereotyping seems evident in a brief reference to unreliable chocolate servants and in illustrations of the chocolate maid, Aunt Lowney, caring for a young white girl in the Valley of Bonbons (chapter 8).

W. W. Denslow's illustrations for Dot and Tot of Merryland, first edition, 1901
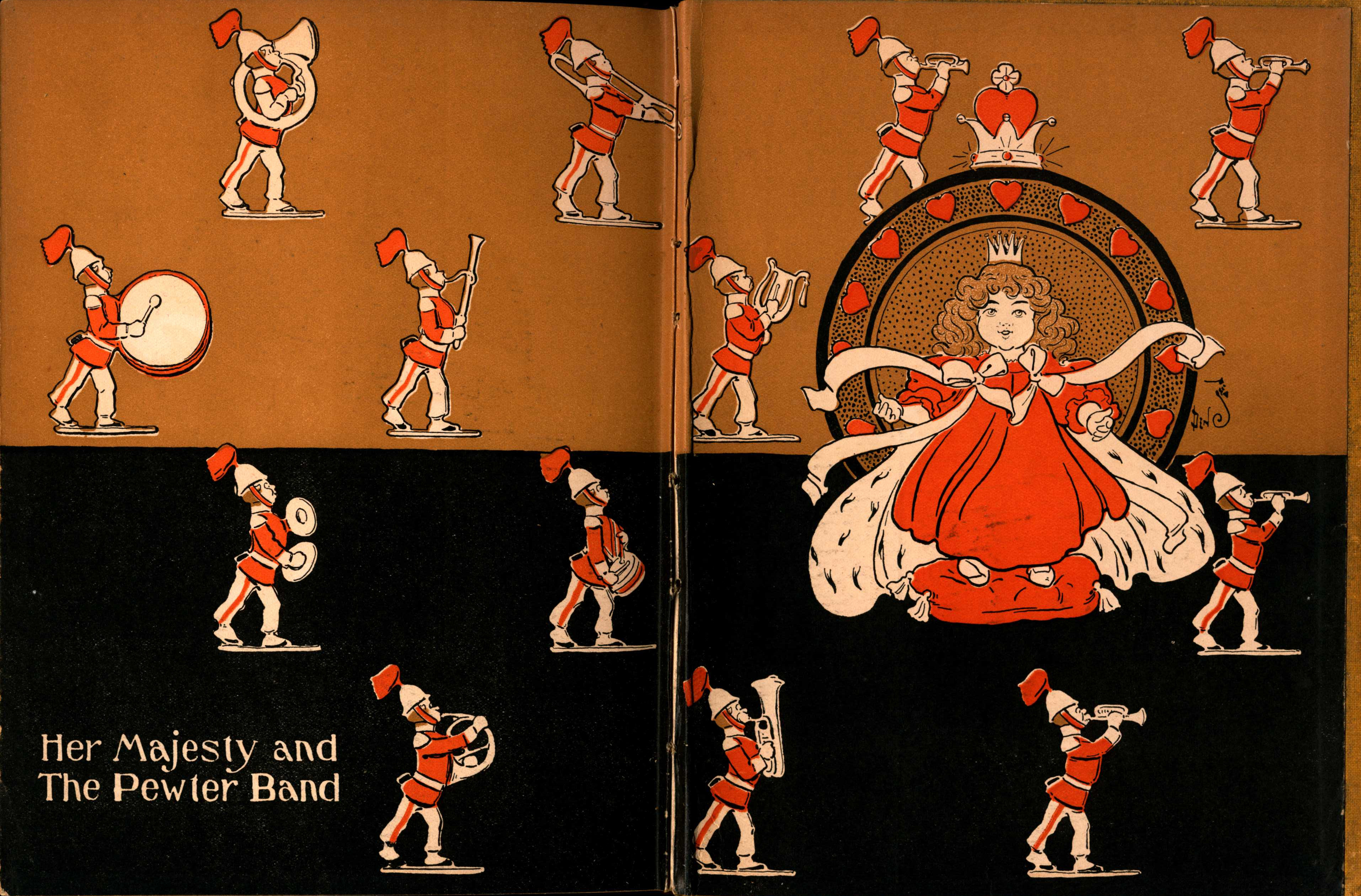
End-paper illustration of The Queen of Merryland and The Pewter Band.

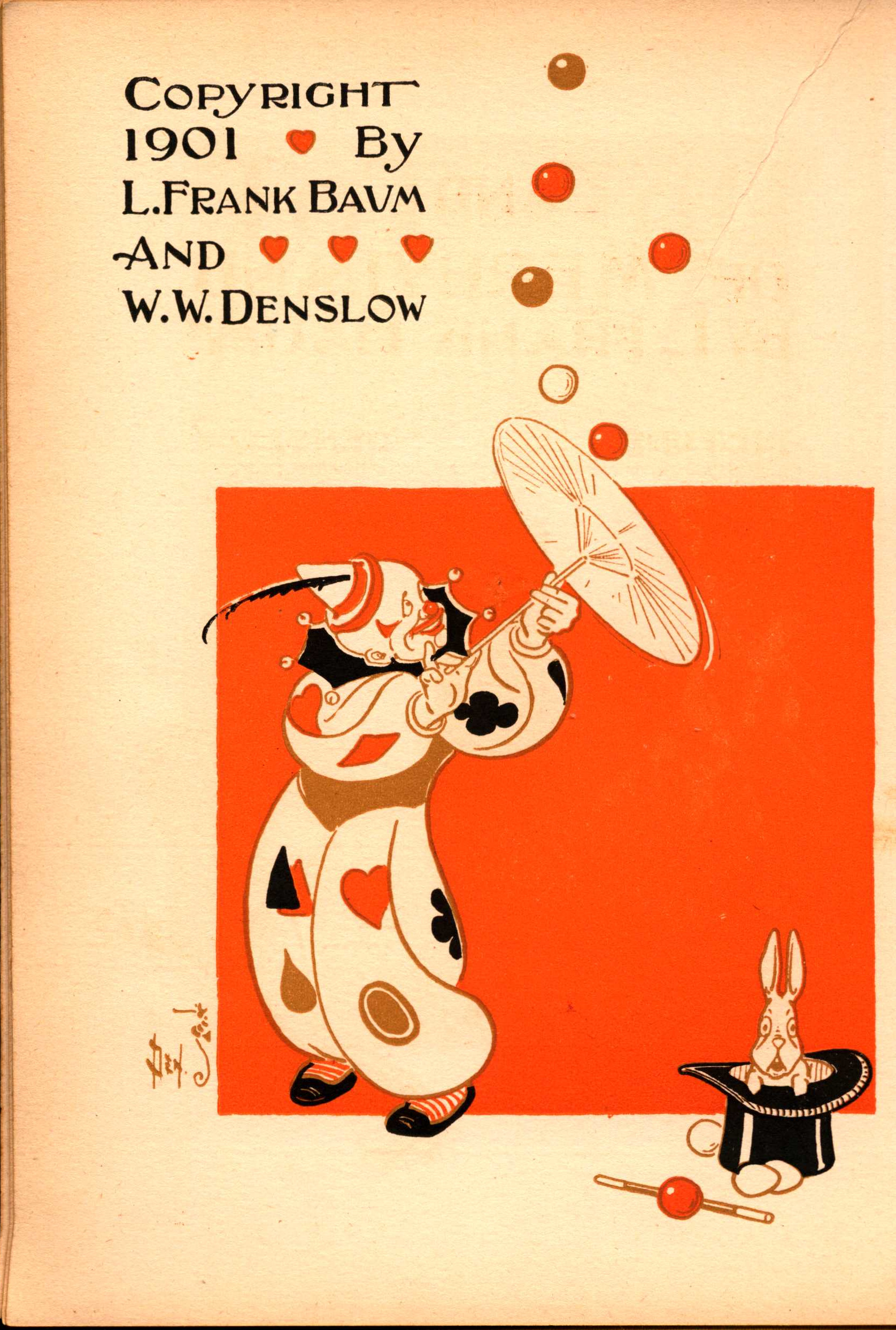
Copyright-page illustration of a performing clown from Clown Country.

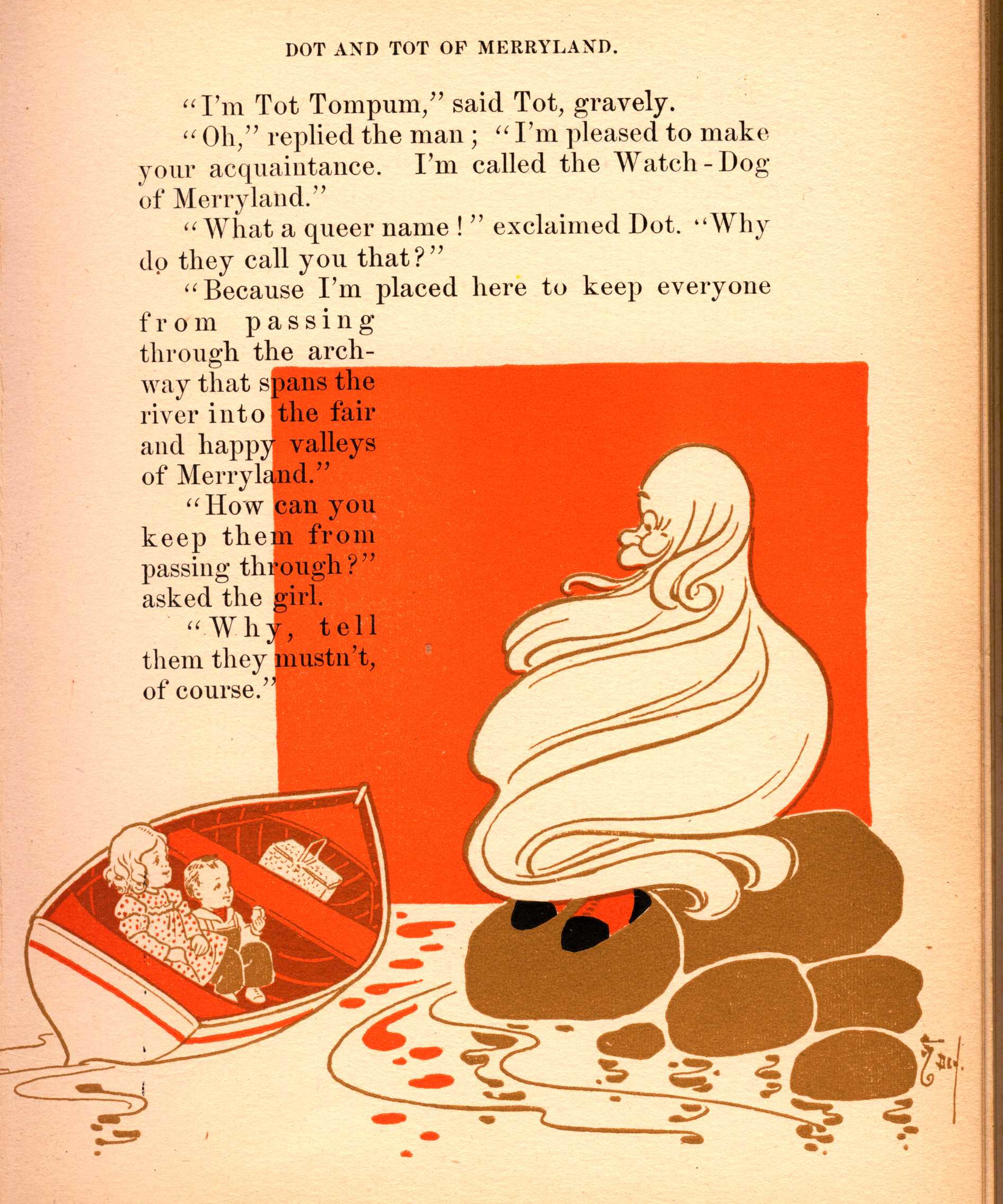
Text illustration: Watch-Dog of Merryland forbids Dot and Tot from entering.

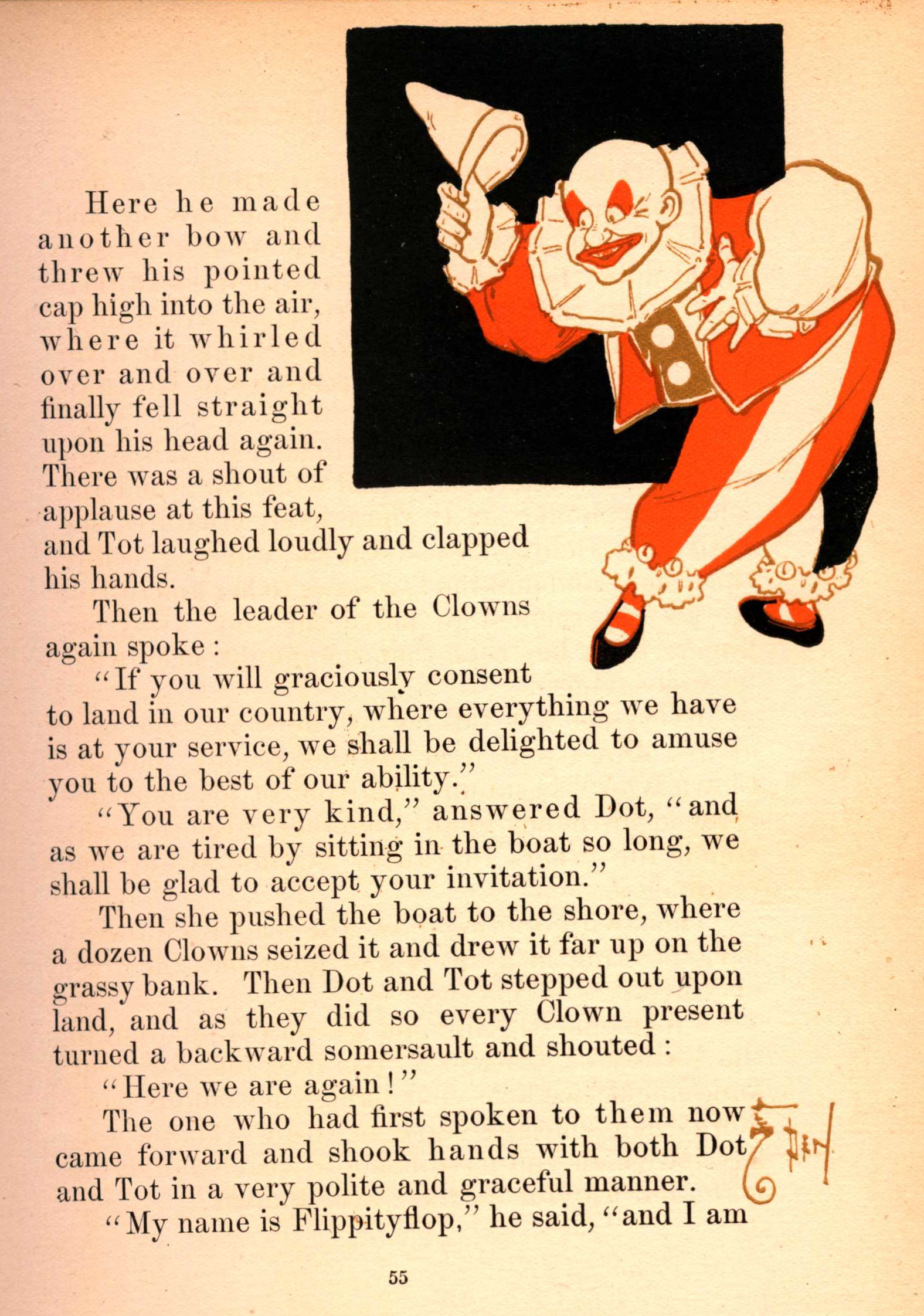
Text illustration: Prince Flippityflop introduces himself.

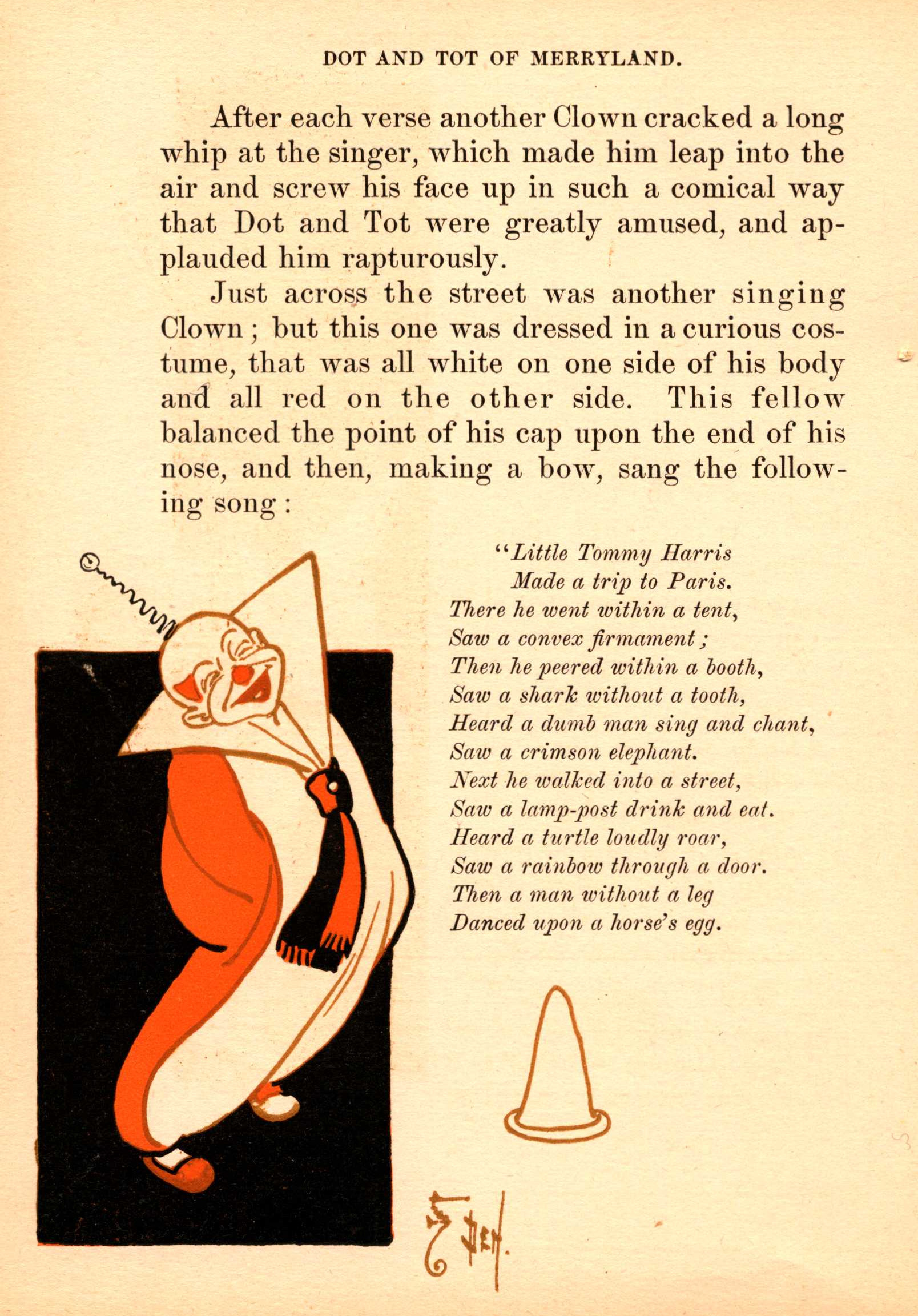
Text illustration: Clown sings a song about Little Tommy Harris' trip to Paris.

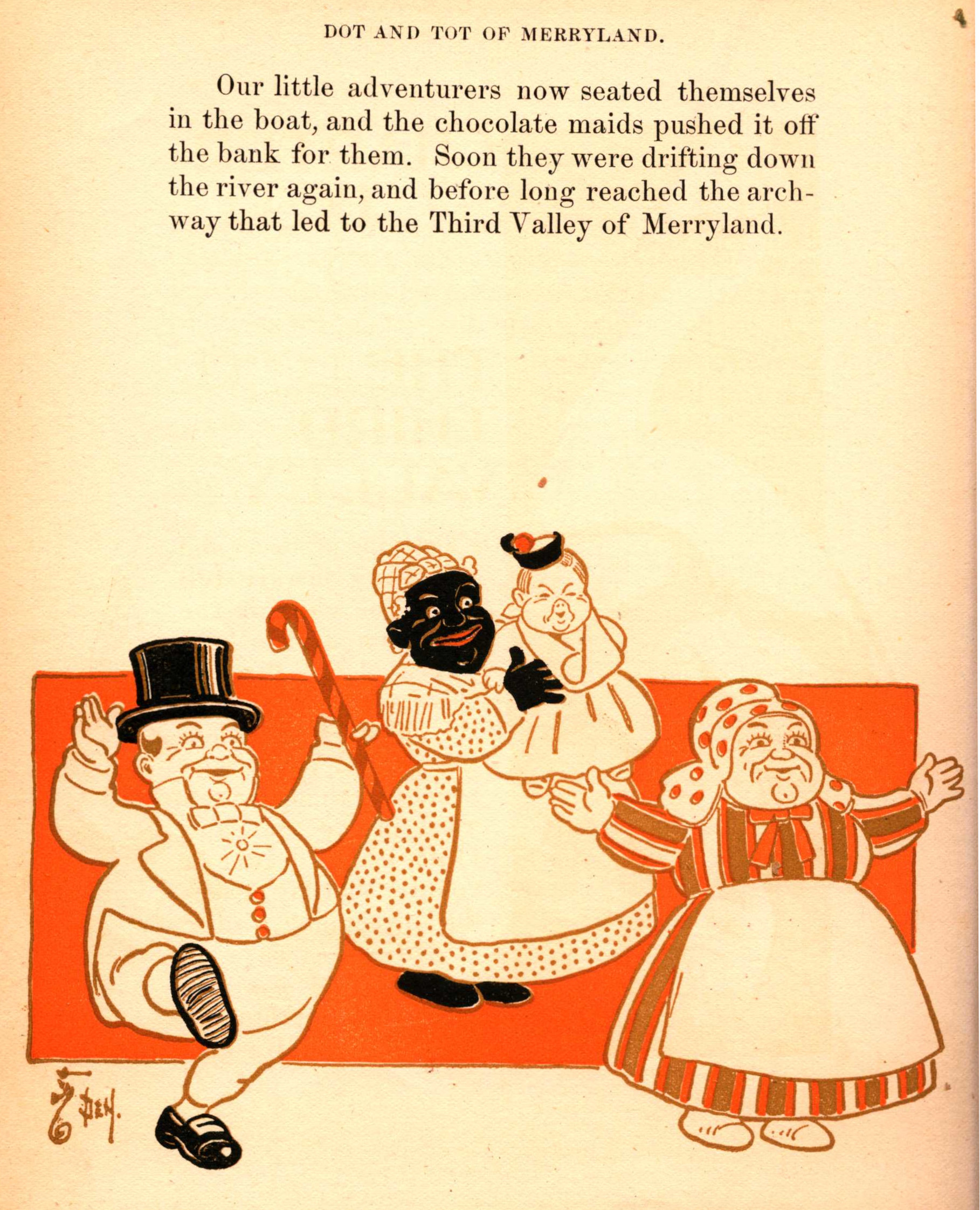
Text illustration: Aunt Lowney holds the daughter of the candy man and his wife.

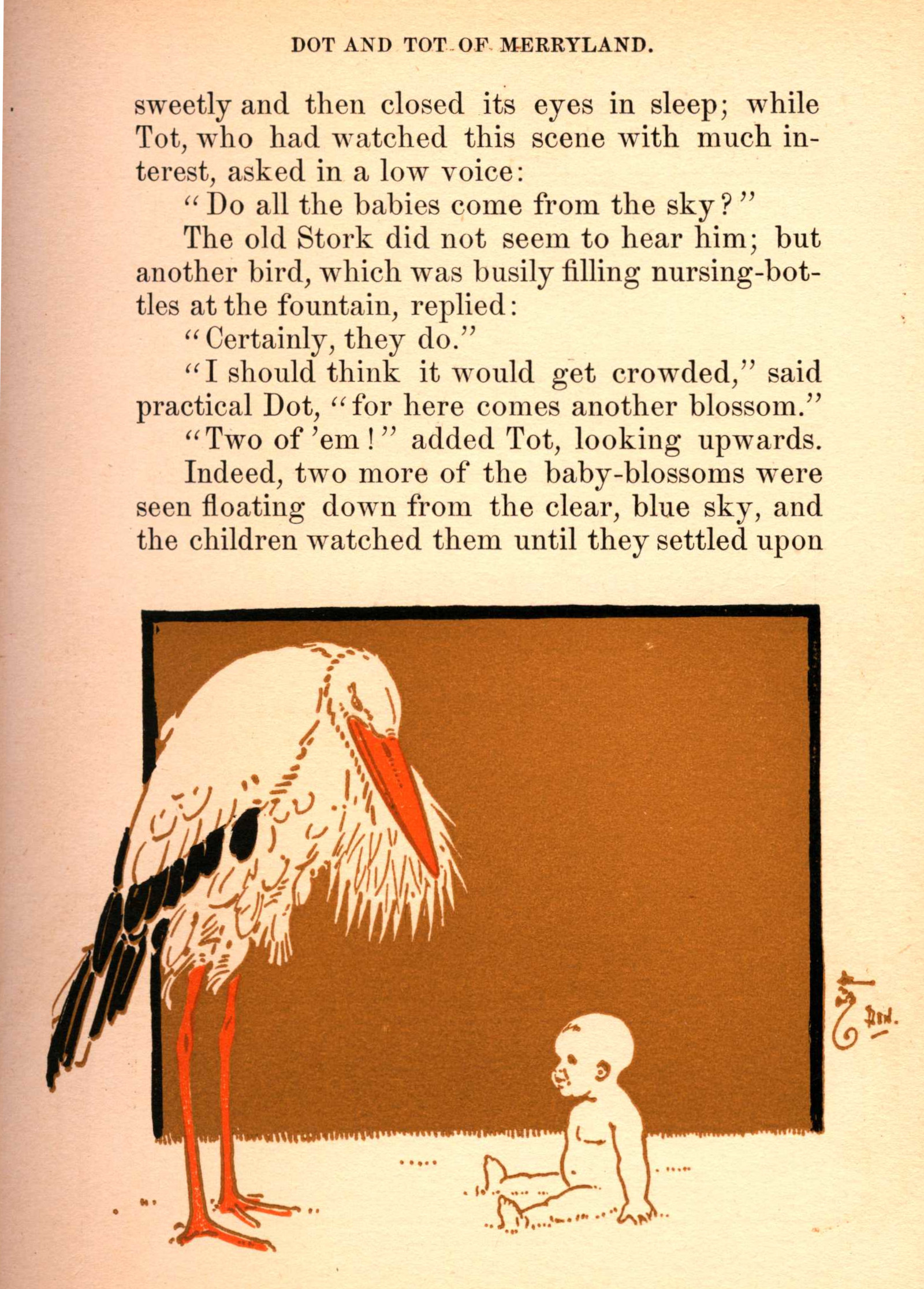
Text illustration: Stork nurse with new blossom baby.

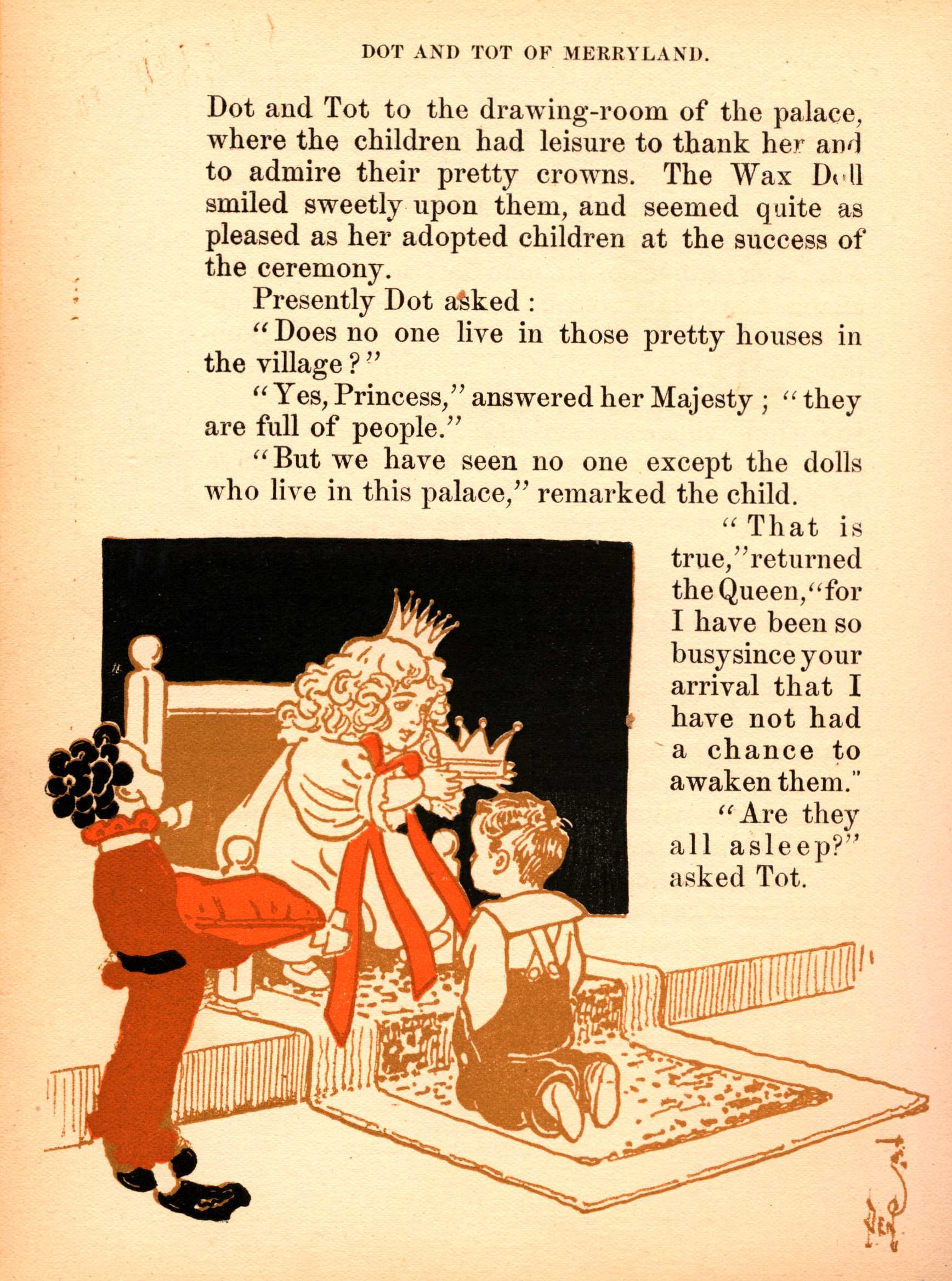
Text illustration: Coronation of Prince Tot of Merryland.

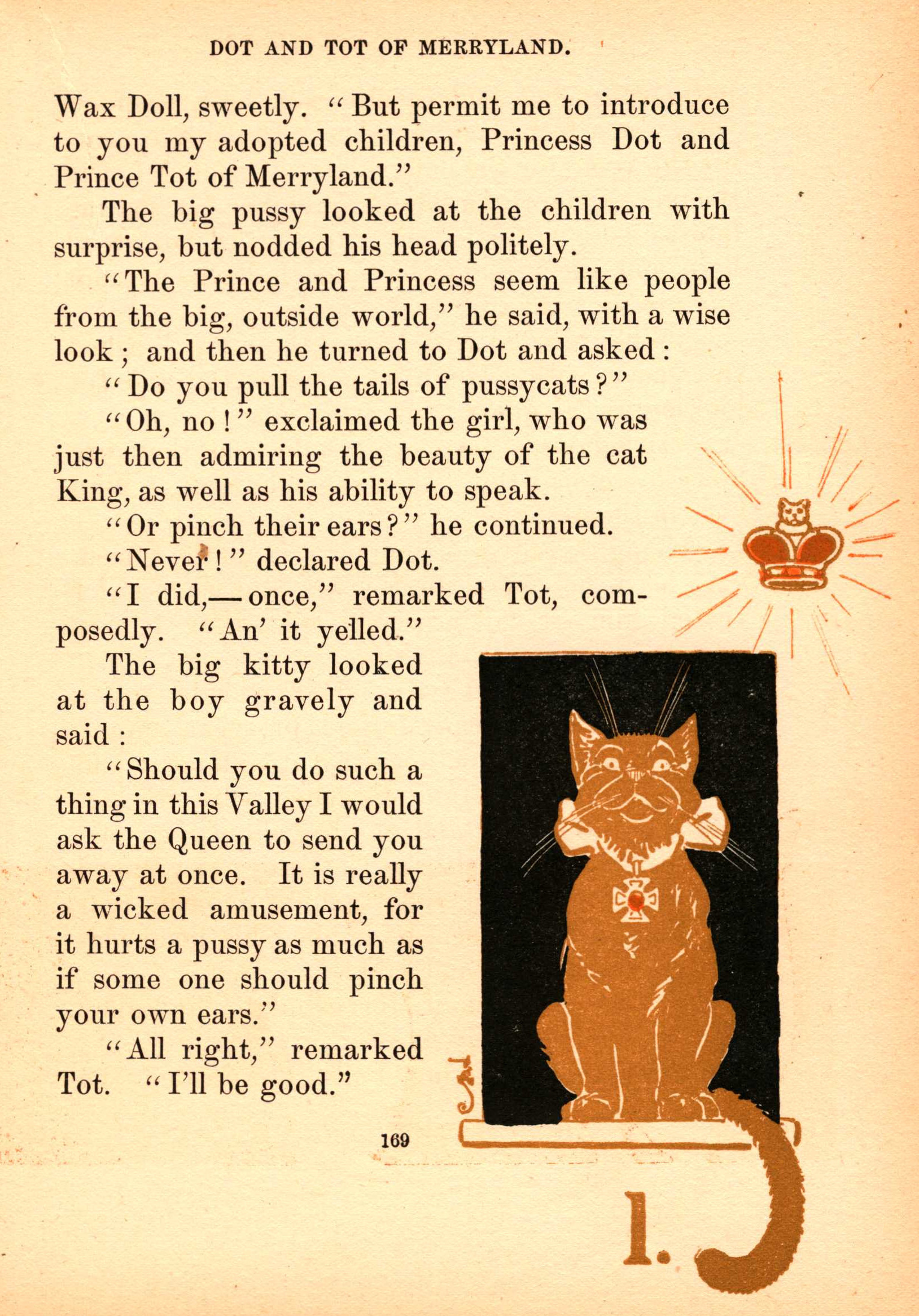
Text illustration: King Felis at the entrance to his house (number 1).

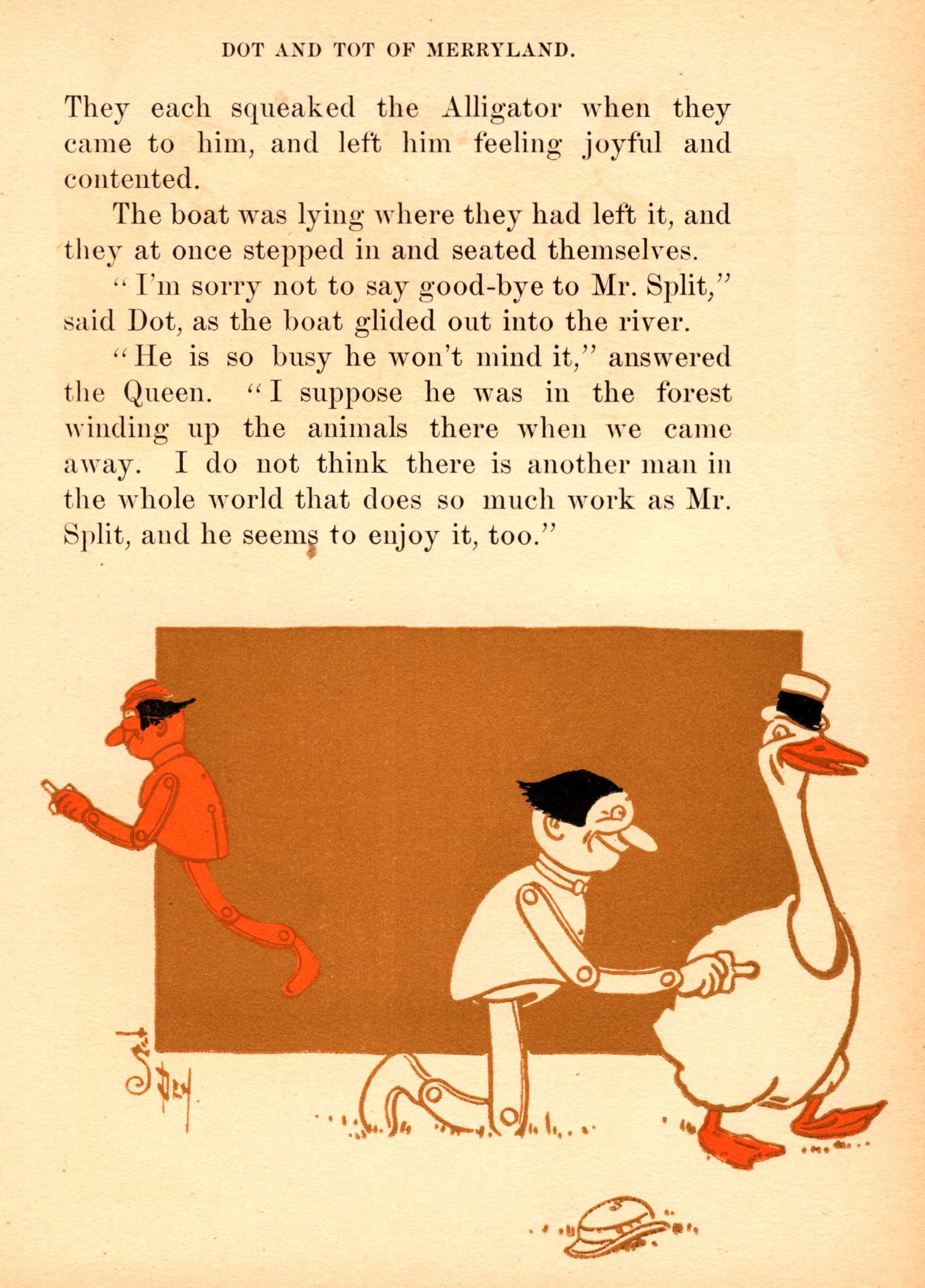
Text illustration: Mr. Right Split winds up a toy goose while Mr. Left Split runs to the next toy.

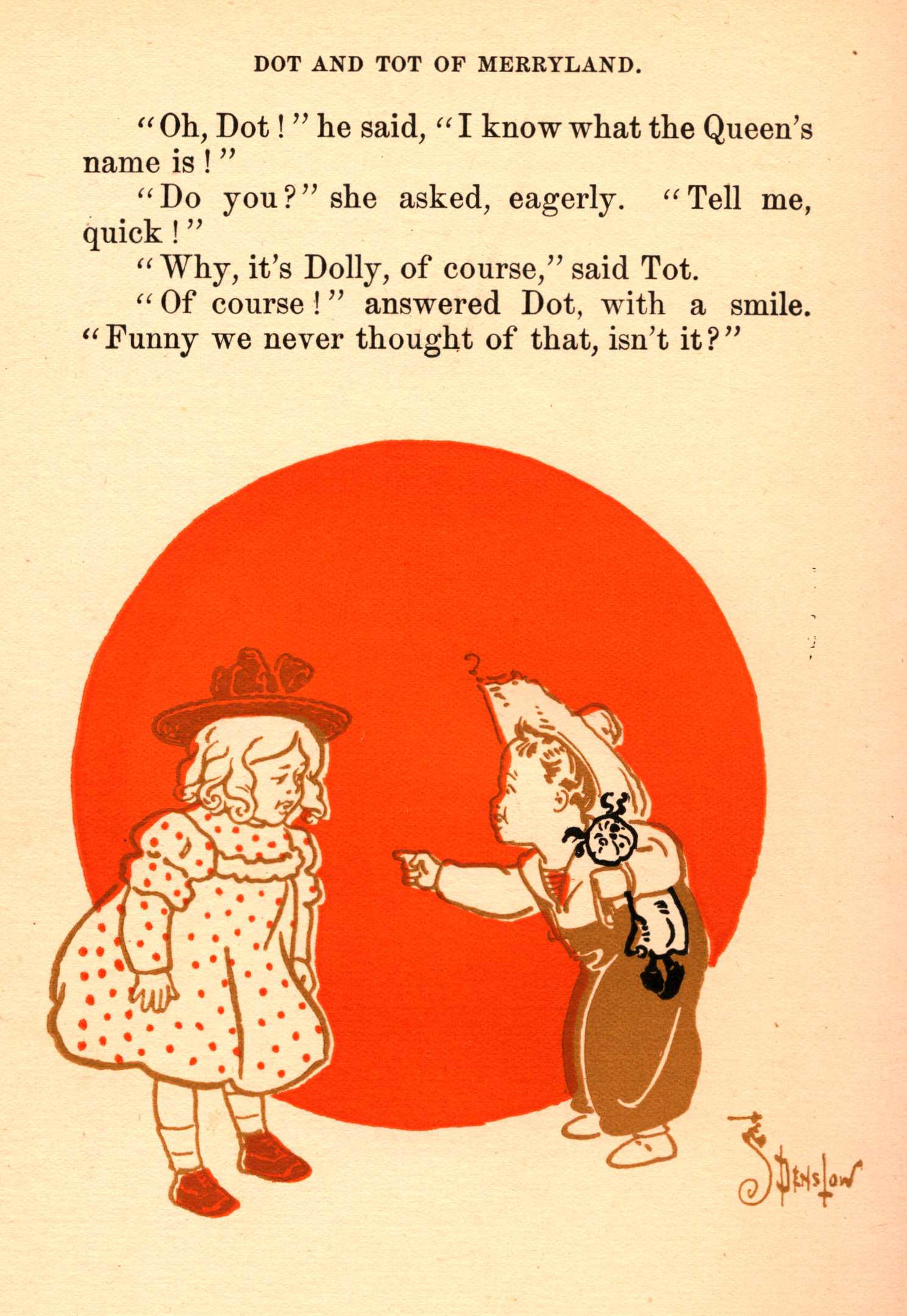
Text illustration: Dot and Tot back home again (Tot has the doll he had lost).

== Books of Wonder edition ==
In 1994, the Emerald City Press, imprint of the Books of Wonder, reprinted Dot and Tot of Merryland with minor text alterations and new illustrations by Donald Abbott. A few lines from the Valley of Bonbons chapter were excised, due to mildly racist content about "our colored servants, who are chocolate." There were no illustrations of Aunt Lowney, perhaps problematic among Denslow's drawings. There are two versions of the book, a paperback and a hardback edition signed by Abbott. The Internet Speculative Fiction Data Base lists seven additional Baum/Denslow-style books illustrated by Donald Abbott, six of which he wrote himself. His illustrations were credited as the first return to Denslow's style in nearly a century.

The interior illustrations are not in color, but Donald Abbott adopted Denslow's style with bold lines and caricature-like forms. There are 28 illustrations in the story portion of the book and about two thirds of these are full-page illustrations. His illustrations were signed "Don" adjacent to a stylized seahorse very similar to Denslow's. In a review of his first book, How the Wizard Came to Oz in The Times-Tribune (Scranton, Pa.), his local newspaper, he stated that he had a lifelong interest in the works of Baum and Denslow and had practiced drawing in Denslow's style from a young age.

== Legacy ==
The Queen of Merryland, four of her wooden soldiers, and the Candy Man attend Princess Ozma's birthday party in L. Frank Baum's 1909 book The Road to Oz.

Baum's map of the surrounding countries of Oz—first seen as an endpaper in Tik-Tok of Oz (1913)—depicts Merryland as being across the desert from the Land of Oz and north of Hiland and Loland. These link the book to L. Frank Baum's famous Oz series. Most subsequent semi-official maps of Oz maintain this link.

Despite being canonized as an Oz-adjacent nation by the aforementioned map, Merryland plays little or no role in the plots of later canonical Oz books. Ruth Plumly Thompson's The Wishing Horse of Oz (1935) contains a brief reference to "the cheerful King of Merryland," who is not otherwise described.

The book was adapted into a musical by Jennifer Kirkeby with music and lyrics by Michael Pretasky for the Stages Theater Company, debuting July 11, 2003 in Hopkins, Minnesota.

The 2014 issue of Oziana from the International Wizard of Oz Club contains two short stories that serve as follow ups to the book: "Lost and Never Found" by David Tai and Jared Davis finds Oz characters Trot and Betsy Bobbin finding themselves in the Valley of Lost Things and meeting the Queen before finding a nearly impossible way out. "Roselawn" by Jared Davis introduces adult versions of Dot and Tot in 1919, in which Dot has become an accomplished illustrator and is reunited with Tot, who has post traumatic stress disorder after serving in World War I.

The Boomerang television cartoon series Dorothy and the Wizard of Oz acknowledges the proximity of Oz and Merryland. Characters from Merryland appear in episodes such as "Haunt Me Not" (October 2, 2017) and "A Cut Above the Rest" (April 12, 2018).

In 2022, Pulitzer Prize winning author, Kathryn Schulz, published a memoir titled Lost and Found which describes her feelings after the death of her father and the meeting of a woman whom she will marry. The loss section of the book begins by recalling Baum's description of the Valley of Lost Things in the context of the loss of her father. She notes other authors who have explored this theme over five centuries and cites Orlando Furioso, the epic poem by Ludovico Ariosto. In it, Orlando loses his wits after a failed love affair. A prophet travels to the moon where everything lost on Earth is to be found. He then returns Orlando's wits to him in a bottle.

She also highlights a scene in the 2018 Mary Poppins film in which the children under her care ask where their deceased mother has gone. Mary Poppins replies "that she dwells on the far side of the moon, 'the place where lost things go' ". Schulz continues:

Still, for all its charm, the Valley of Lost Things is, at its core, a melancholy place. The things we love are banished to it, and we ourselves are banished from it: the one feature every version of it has in common is that, under normal circumstances, it is inaccessible to humans. Only a prophet or Mary Poppins can take you to the repository of lost things on the moon, ...

— Kathryn Schulz (1922)
