= The Wonderful Wizard of Oz =

1900 children's novel by L. Frank Baum

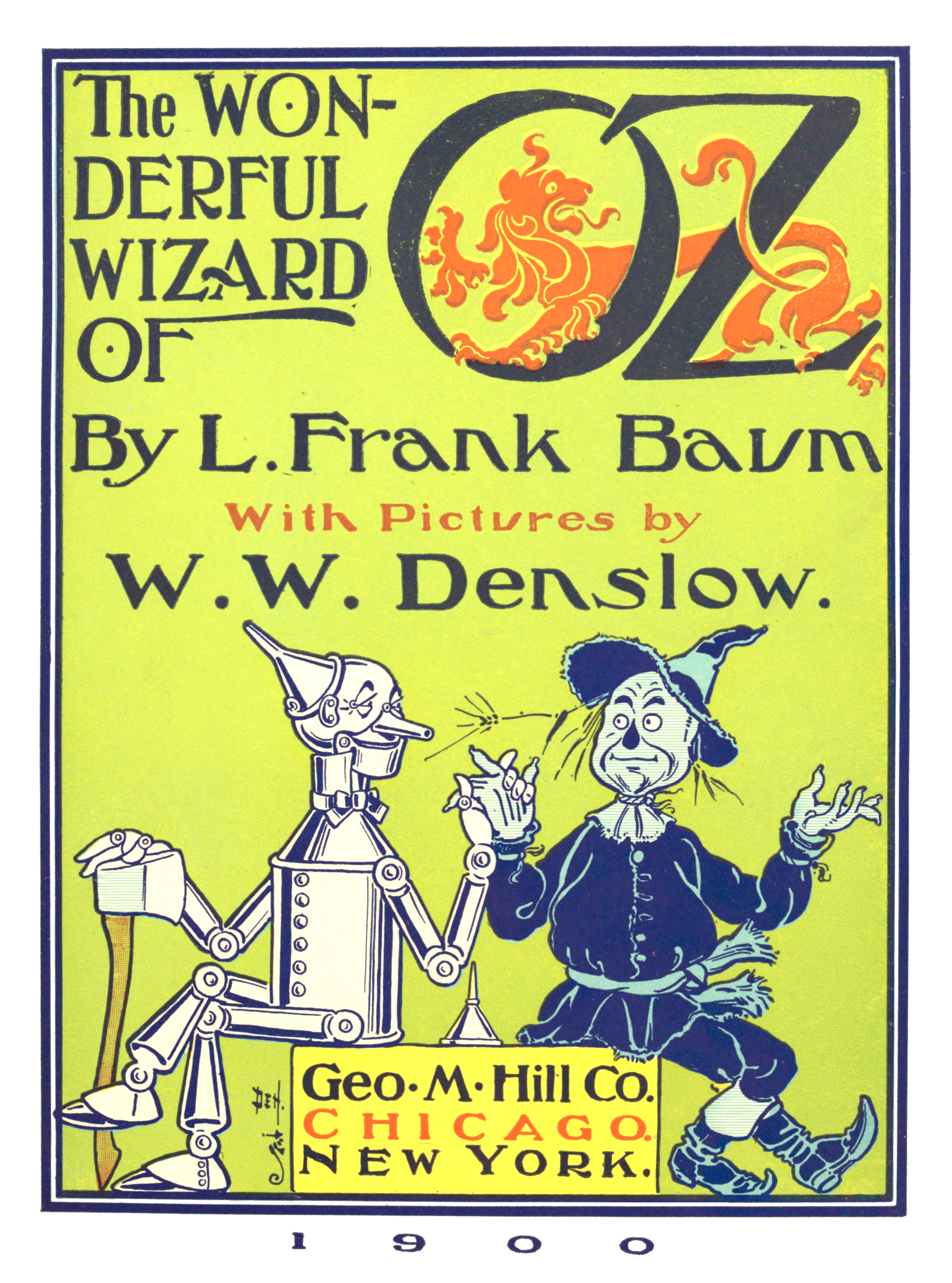
- Original title page
- Author: L. Frank Baum
- Illustrator: W. W. Denslow
- Language: English
- Series: The Oz books
- Genre: Fantasy, children's novel
- Publisher: George M. Hill Company
- Publication date: September 1, 1900; 126 years ago
- Publication place: United States
- Pages: 263
- OCLC: 9506808
- Followed by: The Marvelous Land of Oz
- Text: The Wonderful Wizard of Oz at Wikisource

The Wonderful Wizard of Oz is a 1900 children's fantasy novel written by the American author L. Frank Baum and illustrated by W. W. Denslow. It is the first novel in the Oz series of books. A Kansas farm girl named Dorothy ends up in the magical Land of Oz after she and her pet dog Toto are swept away from their home by a cyclone. Upon her arrival in the magical world of Oz, she learns she cannot return home until she has destroyed the Wicked Witch of the West.

The book was first published in the United States in September 1900 by the George M. Hill Company. It had sold three million copies by the time it entered the public domain in 1956. It was often reprinted under the title The Wizard of Oz, which is the title of the successful 1902 Broadway musical adaptation as well as the iconic 1939 live-action film.

The ground-breaking success of both the original 1900 novel and the 1902 musical prompted Baum to write thirteen additional Oz books, which serve as official sequels to the first story. Over a century later, the book is one of the best-known stories in American literature, and the Library of Congress has declared the work to be "America's greatest and best-loved homegrown fairytale".

== Publication ==
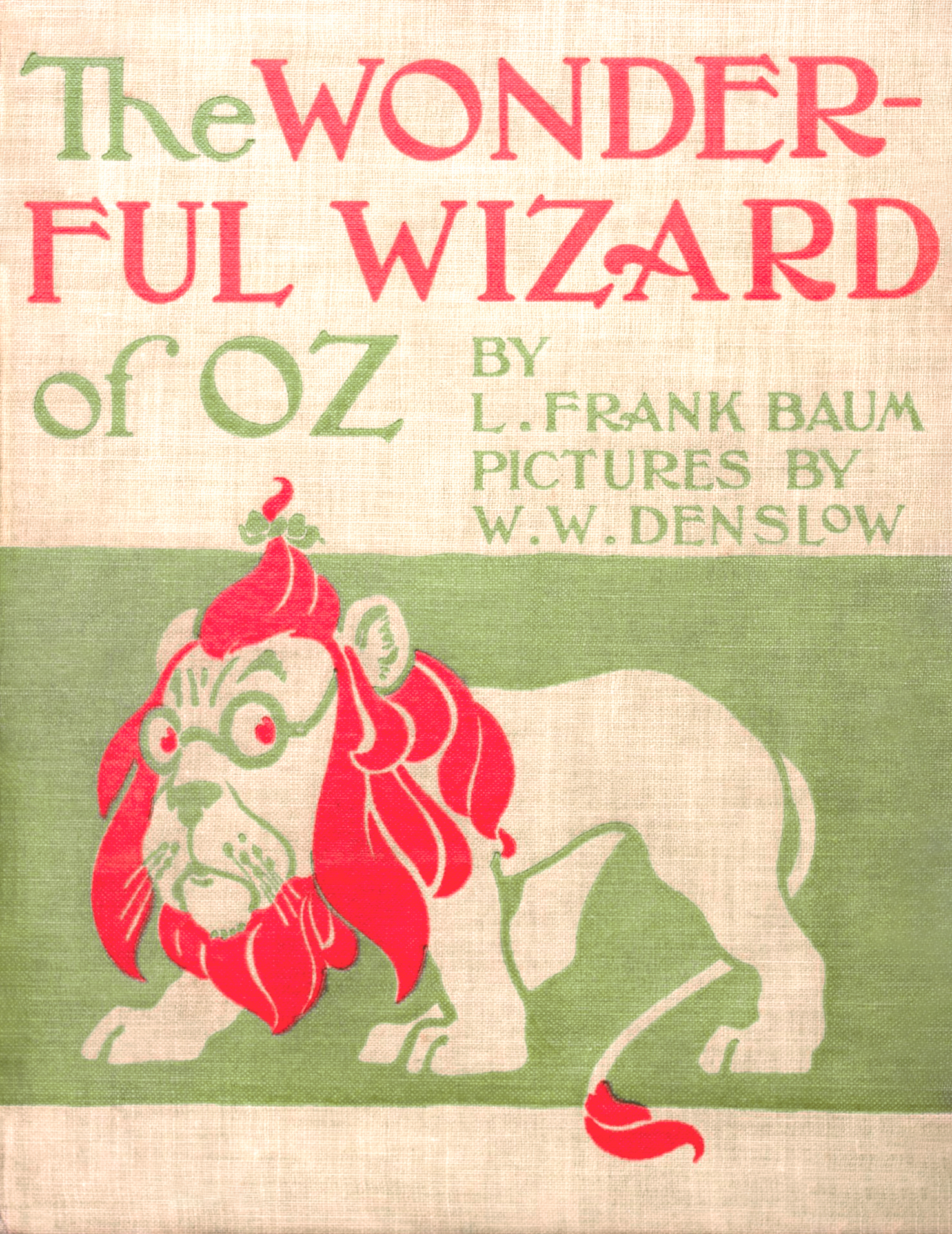
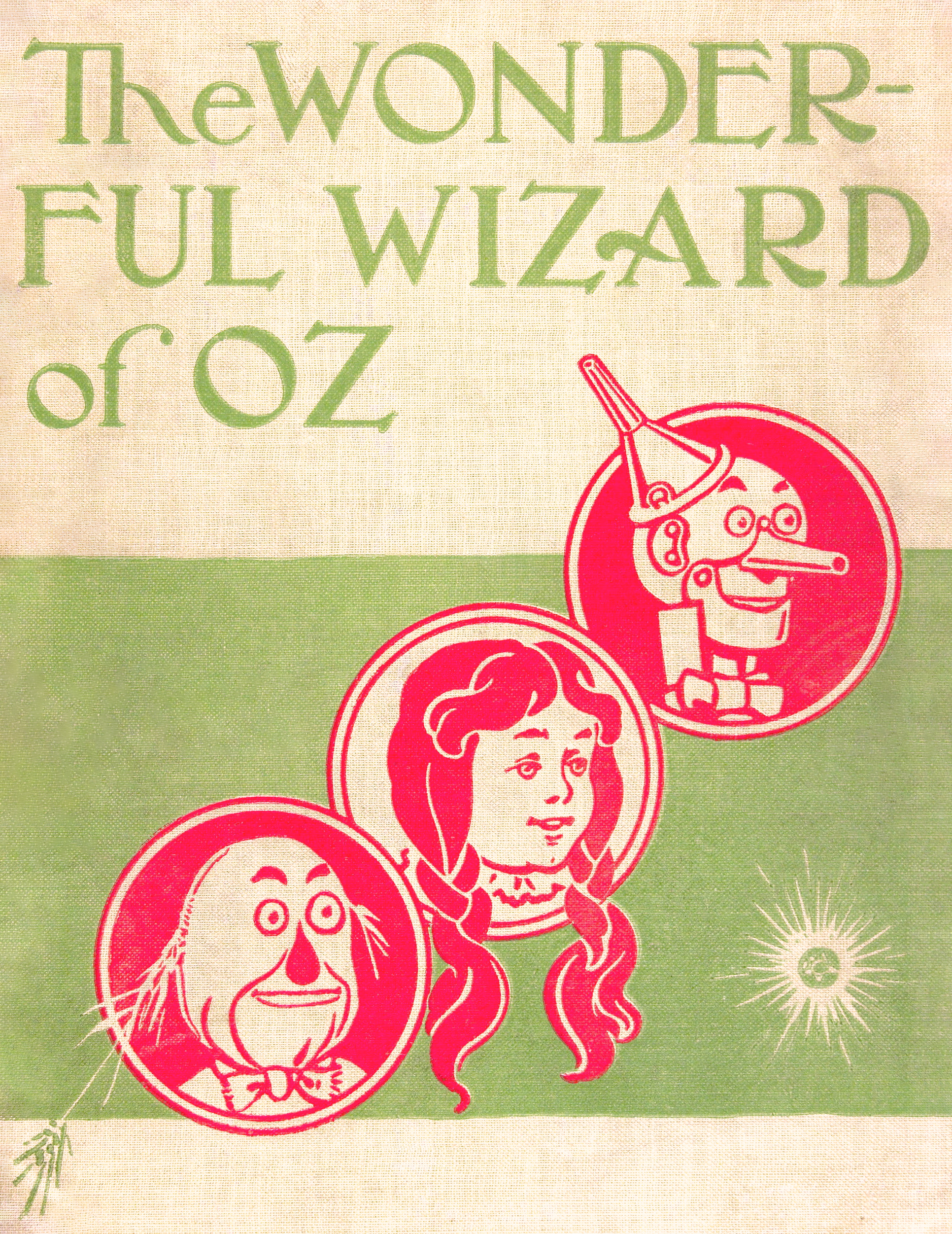
(Left) 1900 first edition cover, published by the George M. Hill Company, Chicago, New York; (right) the 1900 edition original back cover.

L. Frank Baum's story was published by George M. Hill Company. The first edition had a printing of 10,000 copies and was sold in advance of the publication date of September 1, 1900. On May 17, 1900, the first copy came off the press; Baum assembled it by hand and presented it to his sister, Mary Louise Baum Brewster. The public saw it for the first time at a book fair at the Palmer House in Chicago, July 5–20. Its copyright was registered on August 1; full distribution followed in September. By October 1900, the first edition had already sold out, and the second edition of 15,000 copies was nearly depleted.

In a letter to his brother, Baum wrote that the book's publisher, George M. Hill, predicted a sale of about 250,000 copies. In spite of this favorable conjecture, Hill did not initially predict that the book would be phenomenally successful. He agreed to publish the book only when the manager of the Chicago Grand Opera House, Fred R. Hamlin, committed to making it into a musical stage play to publicize the novel.

The play The Wizard of Oz debuted on June 16, 1902. It was revised to suit adult preferences and was crafted as a "musical extravaganza", with the costumes modeled after Denslow's drawings. When Hill's publishing company became bankrupt in 1901, the Indianapolis-based Bobbs-Merrill Company resumed publishing the novel. By 1938, more than one million copies of the book had been printed. By 1956, sales had grown to three million copies.

== Plot ==
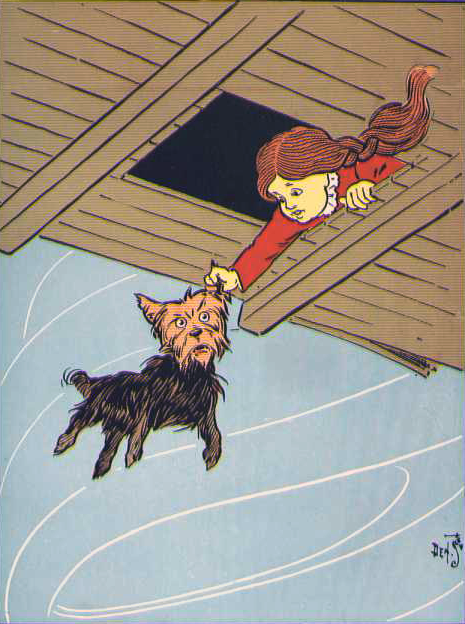
Dorothy catches Toto by the ear as their house is caught up in a cyclone (tornado). First edition illustration by W. W. Denslow.

Dorothy Gale is a young girl who lives with her Aunt Em, Uncle Henry, and dog, Toto, on a farm on the Kansas prairie. One day, Dorothy and Toto are caught up in a "cyclone twister" that deposits them and the farmhouse into Munchkin Country in the magical Land of Oz. The falling house has killed the Wicked Witch of the East, the evil ruler of the Munchkins. The Good Witch of the North arrives with three grateful Munchkins and gives Dorothy the magical Silver Slippers that originally belonged to the Wicked Witch. The Good Witch tells Dorothy that the only way she can return home to Kansas is to follow the yellow brick road to the Emerald City and ask the great and powerful Wizard of Oz to help her. As Dorothy embarks on her journey, the Good Witch of the North kisses her on the forehead, giving her magical protection from harm.

On her way down the yellow brick road, Dorothy attends a banquet held by a Munchkin named Boq. The next day, she frees a Scarecrow from the pole on which he is hanging, applies oil from a can to the rusted joints of a Tin Woodman, and meets a Cowardly Lion. The Scarecrow wants a brain, the Tin Woodman wants a heart, and the Lion wants courage, so Dorothy encourages them to journey with her and Toto to the Emerald City to ask for help from the Wizard.

After several adventures, the travelers arrive at the Emerald City and meet the Guardian of the Gates, who asks them to wear green tinted spectacles to keep their eyes from being blinded by the city's brilliance. Each one is called to see the Wizard. He appears to Dorothy as a giant head, to the Scarecrow as a lovely lady, to the Tin Woodman as a terrible beast, and to the Lion as a ball of fire, with the intention of scaring them all. He agrees to help them all if they kill the Wicked Witch of the West, who rules over Winkie Country. The Guardian warns them that no one has ever managed to defeat the Witch of the West.

The Wicked Witch of the West sees the travelers approaching with her one telescopic eye. She sends a pack of wolves to tear them to pieces, but the Tin Woodman kills them with his axe. She sends a flock of wild crows to peck their eyes out, but the Scarecrow kills them by twisting their necks. She summons a swarm of black bees to sting them, but they are killed while trying to sting the Tin Woodman while the Scarecrow's straw hides the others. She sends a dozen of her Winkie slaves to attack them, but the Lion stands firm to repel them. Finally, she uses the power of her Golden Cap to send the Winged Monkeys to capture Dorothy, Toto, and the Lion. She cages the Lion, scatters the straw of the Scarecrow, and dents the Tin Woodman. Dorothy is forced to become the witch's personal slave, while the Witch schemes to steal her silver shoes' powerful magic.

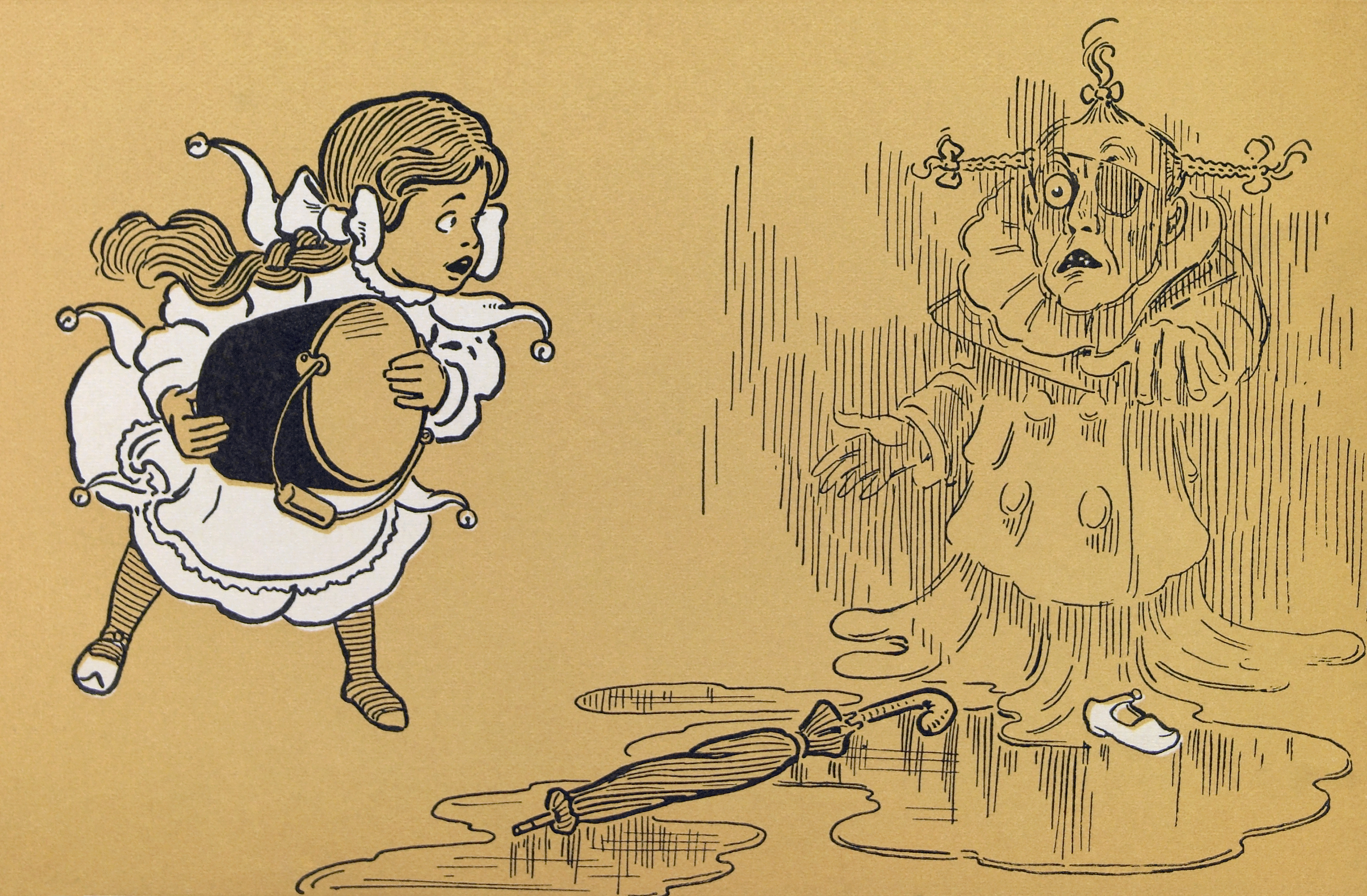
The Wicked Witch melts. First edition illustration by W. W. Denslow.

The witch successfully tricks Dorothy out of one of her silver shoes. Angered, she throws a bucket of water at the witch and is shocked to see her melt away. The Winkies rejoice at being freed from her tyranny and help restuff the Scarecrow and mend the Tin Woodman. They ask the Tin Woodman to become their ruler, which he agrees to do after helping Dorothy return to Kansas. Dorothy finds the witch's Golden Cap and summons the Winged Monkeys to carry her and her friends back to the Emerald City. The King of the Winged Monkeys tells how he and his band are bound by an enchantment to the cap by the sorceress Gayelette from the North, and that Dorothy may use it to summon them two more times.

When Dorothy and her friends meet the Wizard again, Toto tips over a screen in a corner of the throne room that reveals "the Wizard", who sadly explains he is a humbug—an ordinary old man who, by a hot air balloon, came to Oz long ago from Omaha. He provides the Scarecrow with a head full of bran, pins, and needles ("a lot of bran-new brains"), the Tin Woodman with a silk heart stuffed with sawdust, and the Lion a potion of "courage". Their faith in his power gives these items a focus for their desires. He decides to take Dorothy and Toto home and then go back to Omaha in his balloon. At the send-off, he appoints the Scarecrow to rule in his stead, which he agrees to do after helping Dorothy return to Kansas. Toto chases a kitten in the crowd and Dorothy goes after him, but the ropes holding the balloon break and the Wizard floats away.

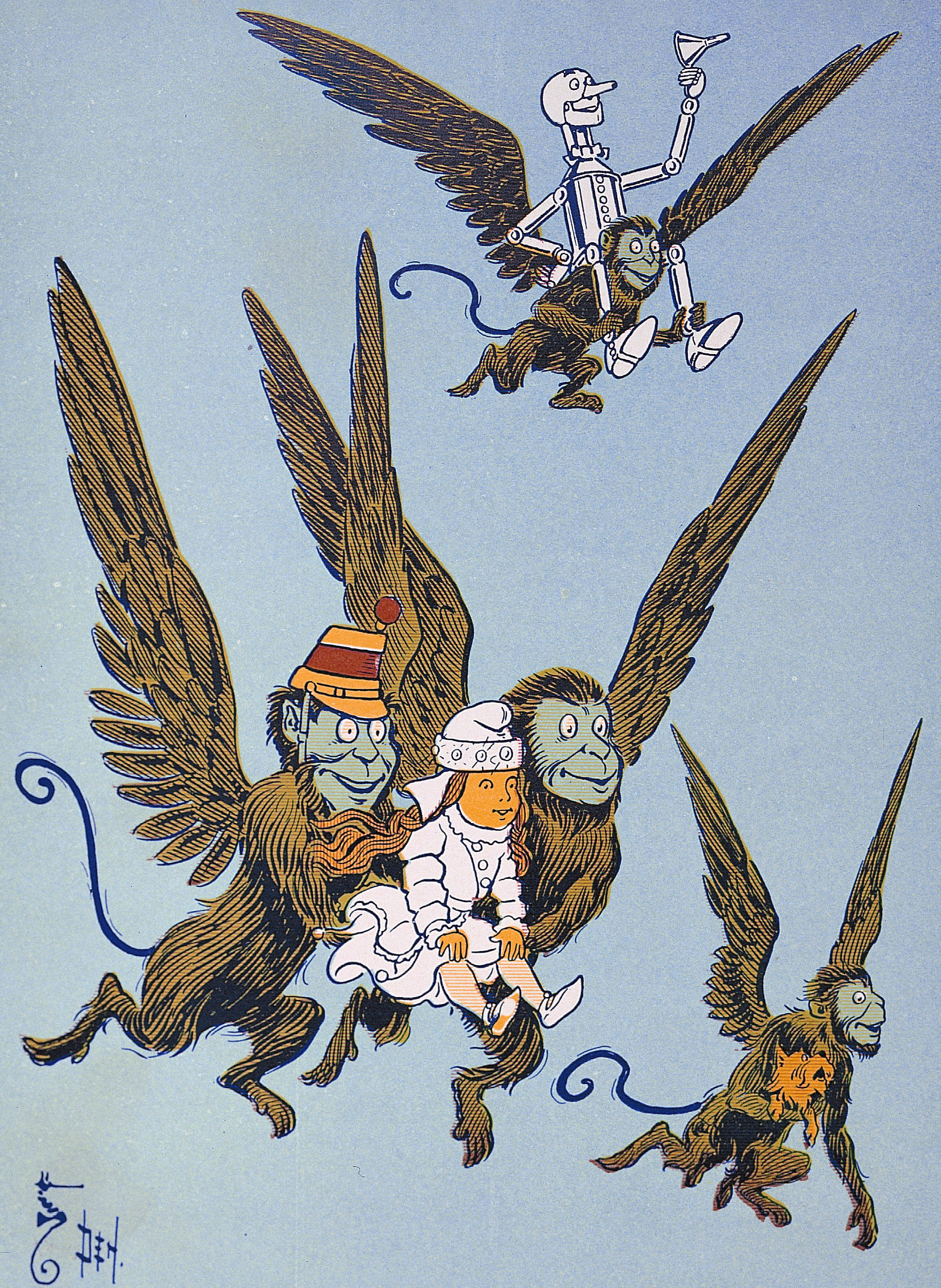
The Winged Monkeys transport Dorothy.

Dorothy summons the Winged Monkeys and tells them to carry her and Toto home, but they explain they cannot cross the desert surrounding Oz. The Soldier with the Green Whiskers informs Dorothy that Glinda, the Good Witch of the South may be able to help her return home, so the travelers begin their journey to see Glinda's castle in Quadling Country. On the way, the Lion kills a giant spider who is terrorizing the animals in a forest. They ask him to become their king, which he agrees to do after helping Dorothy return to Kansas. Dorothy summons the Winged Monkeys a third time to fly them over a hill to Glinda's castle.

Glinda greets them and reveals that Dorothy's silver shoes can take her anywhere she wishes to go. She embraces her friends, all of whom will be returned to their new kingdoms through Glinda's three uses of the Golden Cap: the Scarecrow to the Emerald City, the Tin Woodman to Winkie Country, and the Lion to the forest; after which the cap will be given to the King of the Winged Monkeys, freeing him and his band. Dorothy takes Toto in her arms, knocks her heels together three times, and wishes to return home. Instantly, she begins whirling through the air and rolling on the grass of the Kansas prairie, up to the farmhouse, though the silver shoes fall off her feet en route and are lost in the Deadly Desert. She runs to Aunt Em, saying "I'm so glad to be home again!"

== Illustrations ==
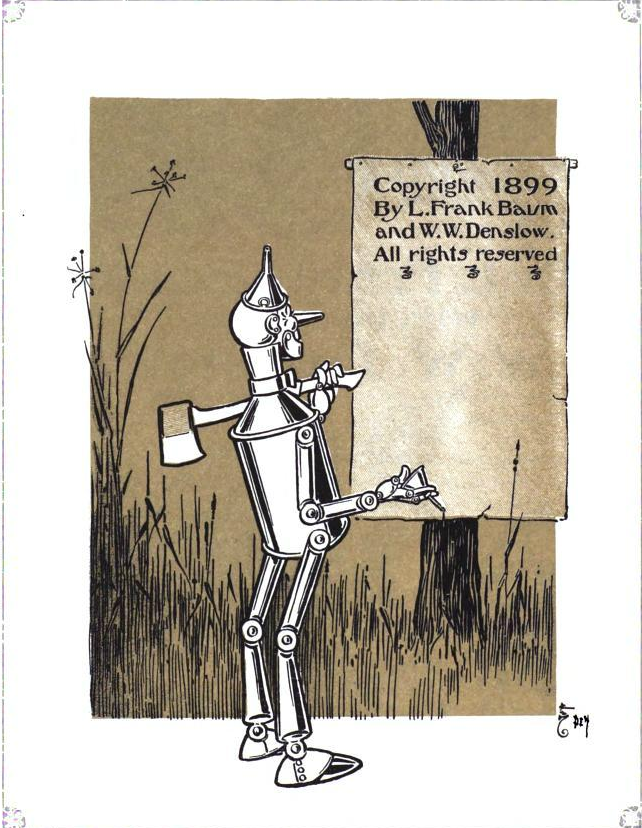
Illustrator W. W. Denslow co-held the copyright with L. Frank Baum.

The book was illustrated by Baum's friend and collaborator W. W. Denslow, who also co-held the copyright. The design was lavish for the time, with illustrations on many pages, backgrounds in different colors, and several color plate illustrations. The typeface featured the newly designed Monotype Old Style. In September 1900, The Grand Rapids Herald wrote that Denslow's illustrations are "quite as much of the story as in the writing". The editorial opined that had it not been for Denslow's pictures, the readers would be unable to picture precisely the figures of Dorothy, Toto, and the other characters.

Denslow's illustrations were so well known that merchants of many products obtained permission to use them to promote their wares. The forms of the Scarecrow, the Tin Woodman, the Cowardly Lion, the Wizard, and Dorothy were made into rubber and metal sculptures. Costume jewelry, mechanical toys, and soaps were also designed using their figures. The distinctive look of Denslow's illustrations led to imitators at the time, most notably Eva Katherine Gibson's Zauberlinda, the Wise Witch, which mimicked both the typography and the illustration design of Oz.

A new edition of the book appeared in 1944, with illustrations by Evelyn Copelman. Although it was claimed that the new illustrations were based on Denslow's originals, they more closely resemble the characters as seen in the famous 1939 film version of Baum's book.

== Creative inspiration ==
=== Baum's personal life ===
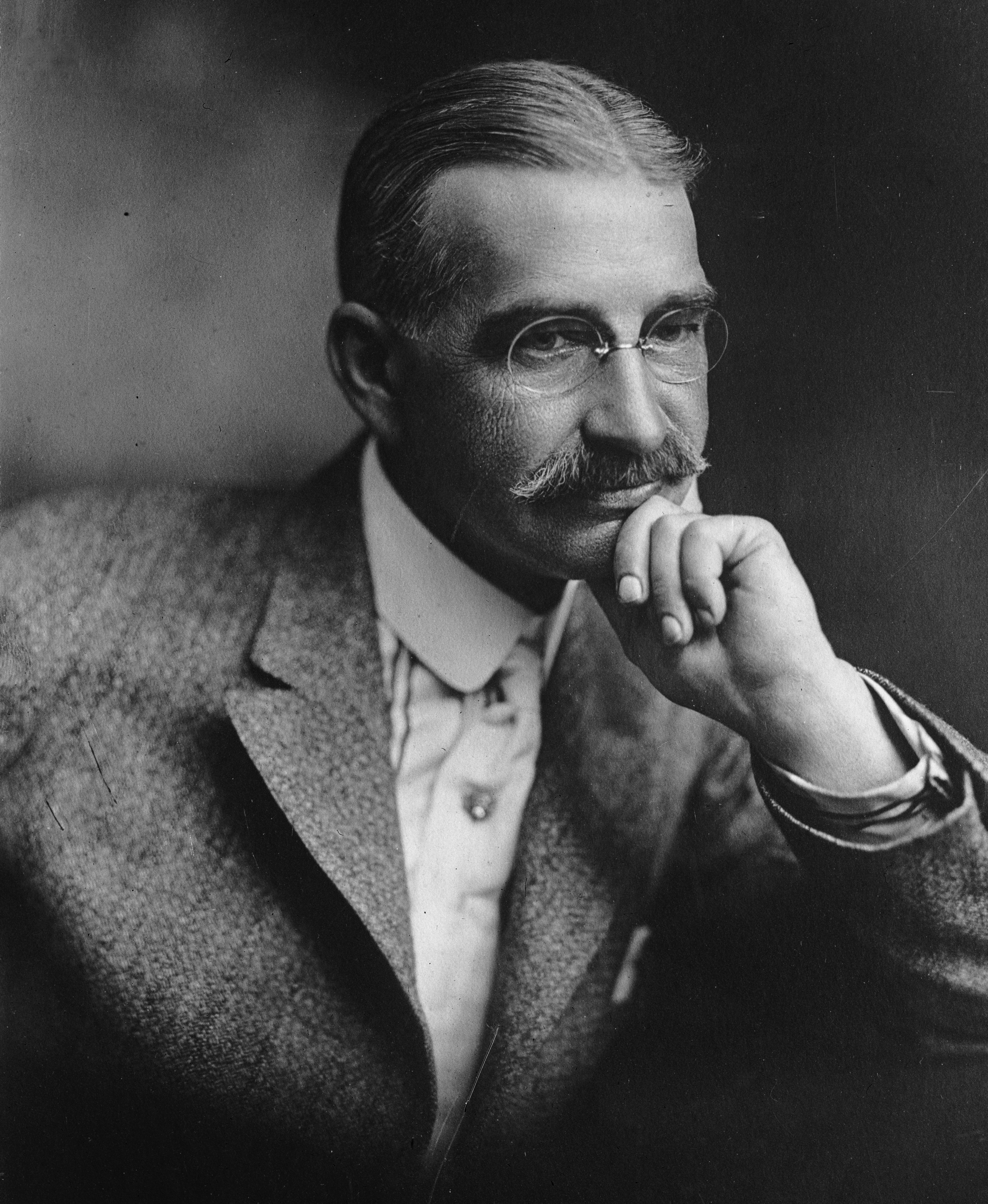
L. Frank Baum circa 1911

According to Baum's son, Harry Neal, the author had often told his children "whimsical stories before they became material for his books". Harry Baum called his father the "swellest man I knew", a man who was able to give a decent reason as to why black birds cooked in a pie could afterwards get out and sing.

Many of the characters, props, and ideas in the novel were drawn from Baum's personal life and experiences. Baum held different jobs, moved a lot, and was exposed to many people, so the inspiration for the story could have been taken from many different aspects of his life. In the introduction to the story, Baum writes that "it aspires to being a modernized fairy tale, in which the wonderment and joy are retained and the heart-aches and nightmares are left out".

==== Scarecrow and the Tin Woodman ====
As a child, Baum frequently had nightmares of a scarecrow pursuing him across a field. Moments before the scarecrow's "ragged hay fingers" nearly gripped his neck, it would fall apart before his eyes. Decades later, as an adult, Baum integrated his tormentor into the novel as the Scarecrow. In the early 1880s, Baum's play Matches was being performed when a "flicker from a kerosene lantern sparked the rafters", causing the Baum opera house to be consumed by flames. Scholar Evan I. Schwartz suggested that this might have inspired the Scarecrow's severest terror: "There is only one thing in the world I am afraid of. A lighted match."

According to Baum's son Harry, the Tin Woodman was born from Baum's attraction to window displays. He wished to make something captivating for the window displays, so he used an eclectic assortment of scraps to craft a striking figure. From a wash-boiler he made a body, from bolted stovepipes he made arms and legs, and from the bottom of a saucepan he made a face. Baum then placed a funnel hat on the figure, which ultimately became the Tin Woodman.

==== Dorothy, Uncle Henry, and the Witches ====
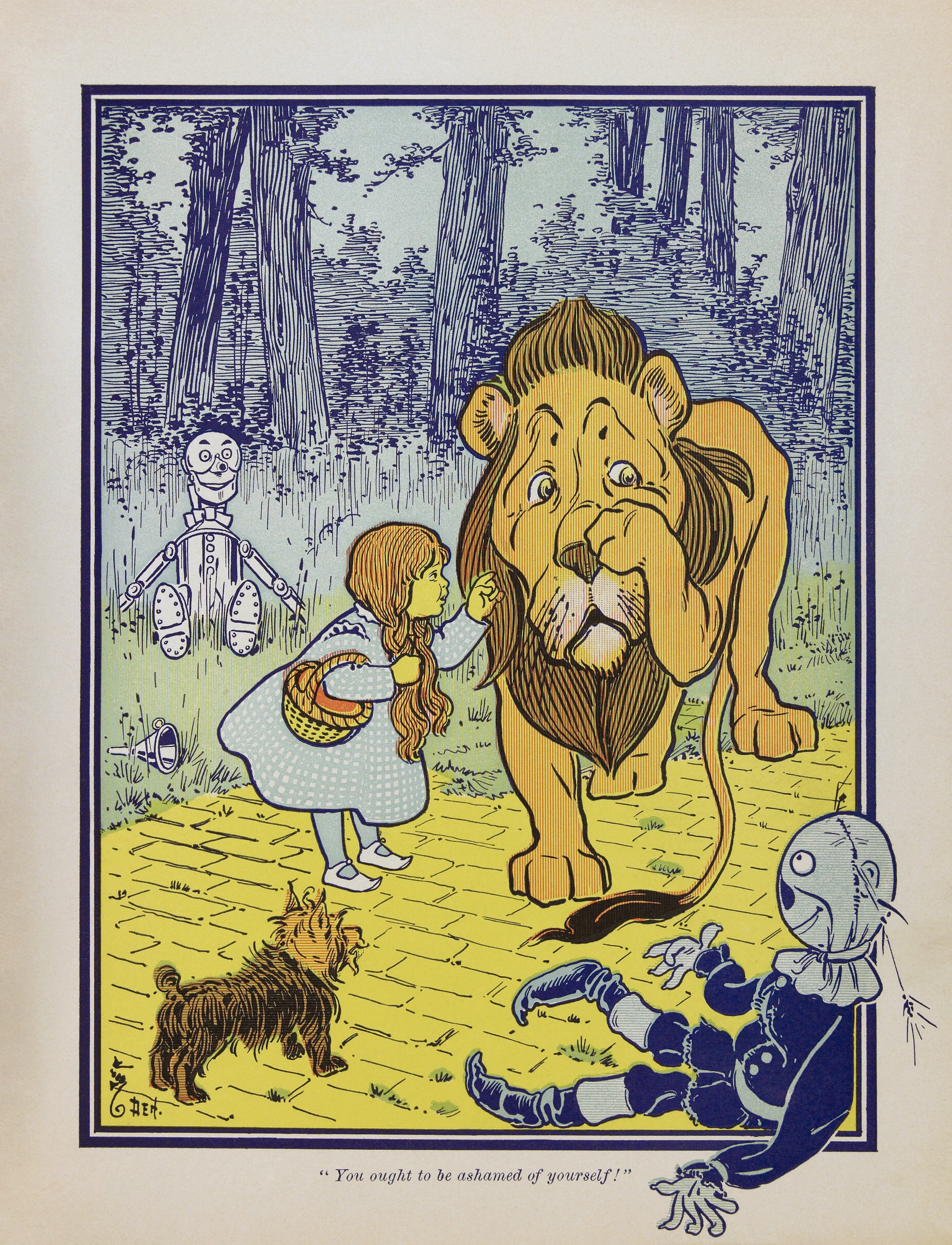
Dorothy meeting the Cowardly Lion (Denslow, 1900)

Baum's wife Maud Gage frequently visited their newborn niece, Dorothy Louise Gage, whom she adored as the daughter she never had. The infant became gravely sick and died at the age of five months in Bloomington, Illinois, on November 11, 1898, from "congestion of the brain". Maud was devastated. To assuage her distress, Baum made his protagonist of The Wonderful Wizard of Oz a girl named Dorothy, and he dedicated the book to his wife. The baby was buried at Evergreen Cemetery, where her gravestone has a statue of the character Dorothy placed next to it. Baum's mother-in-law, activist Matilda Joslyn Gage, has also been cited as one of the inspirations for Dorothy.

Decades later, Jocelyn Burdick—the daughter of Baum's other niece, Magdalena Carpenter, and a former Democratic U.S. Senator from North Dakota—asserted that her mother also partly inspired the character of Dorothy. Burdick claimed that her great-uncle spent "considerable time at the Сarpenter homestead ... and became very attached to Magdalena". Burdick has reported many similarities between her mother's homestead and the farm of Aunt Em and Uncle Henry.

Uncle Henry was modeled after Henry Gage, Baum's father-in-law. Bossed around by his wife Matilda, Henry rarely dissented with her. He flourished in business, though, and his neighbors looked up to him. Likewise, Uncle Henry was a "passive but hard-working man" who "looked stern and solemn, and rarely spoke".

The witches in the novel were influenced by witch-hunting research gathered by Matilda Joslyn Gage. The stories of barbarous acts against accused witches scared Baum. Two key events in the novel involve wicked witches who meet their death through metaphorical means. Baum's biographers have also drawn correlations between Baum's Good Witch and Gage's feminist writings.

==== The Emerald City and the Land of Oz ====
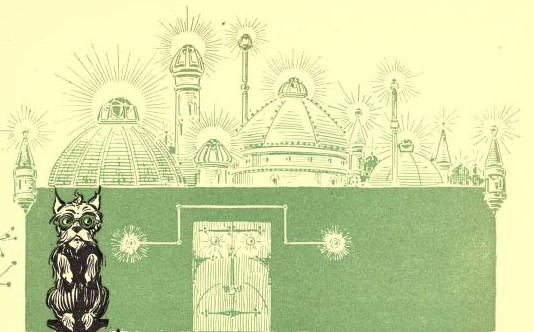
The Emerald City (Denslow, 1900)

In 1890, Baum lived in Aberdeen, South Dakota during a drought, and he wrote a story in his "Our Landlady" column in Aberdeen's The Saturday Pioneer about a farmer who gave green goggles to his horses, causing them to believe that the wood chips that they were eating were pieces of grass. Similarly, the Wizard made the people in the Emerald City wear green goggles so that they would believe that their city was built from emeralds.

During Baum's short stay in Aberdeen, the dissemination of myths about the West continued. However, the West, instead of being a wonderland, turned into a wasteland because of a drought and a depression. In 1891, Baum moved his family from South Dakota to Chicago. At that time, Chicago was getting ready for the World's Columbian Exposition in 1893. Scholar Laura Barrett stated that Chicago was "considerably more akin to Oz than to Kansas". After discovering that the myths about the West's incalculable riches were baseless, Baum created "an extension of the American frontier in Oz". In many respects, Baum's creation is similar to the actual frontier save for the fact that the West was still undeveloped at the time. The Munchkins Dorothy encounters at the beginning of the novel represent farmers, as do the Winkies she later meets.

Local legend has it that the Emerald City, home of the Wizard of Oz, was inspired by a prominent castle-like building in the community of Castle Park near Holland, Michigan, where Baum lived during the summer. The yellow brick road was derived from a road at that time paved by yellow bricks, located in Peekskill, New York, where Baum attended the Peekskill Military Academy. Baum scholars often refer to the 1893 Chicago World's Fair (the "White City") as an inspiration for the Emerald City. Other legends suggest that the inspiration came from the Hotel Del Coronado near San Diego, California. Baum was a frequent guest at the hotel and had written several of the Oz books there. In a 1903 interview with The Publishers' Weekly, Baum said that the name "Oz" came from his file cabinet labeled "O–Z".

Some critics have suggested that Baum's Oz may have been inspired by Australia. Australia is often colloquially spelled or referred to as "Oz". Furthermore, in Ozma of Oz (1907), Dorothy gets back to Oz as the result of a storm at sea while she and Uncle Henry are traveling by ship to Australia. Like Australia, Oz is an island continent somewhere to the west of California with inhabited regions bordering on a great desert. Baum perhaps intended Oz to be Australia or a magical land in the center of the great Australian desert.

=== Alice's Adventures in Wonderland ===
In addition to being influenced by the fairy-tales of the Brothers Grimm and Hans Christian Andersen, Baum was significantly influenced by English writer Lewis Carroll's 1865 novel Alice's Adventures in Wonderland. Although Baum found the plot of Carroll's novel to be incoherent, he identified the book's source of popularity as Alice herself—a child with whom younger readers could identify, and this influenced Baum's choice of Dorothy as his protagonist.

Although influenced by Carroll's distinctly English work, Baum nonetheless sought to create a story that had recognizable American elements, such as farming and industrialization. Consequently, Baum combined the conventional features of a fairy tale such as witches and wizards with well-known fixtures in his young readers' Midwestern lives such as scarecrows and cornfields.

=== Influence of Denslow ===
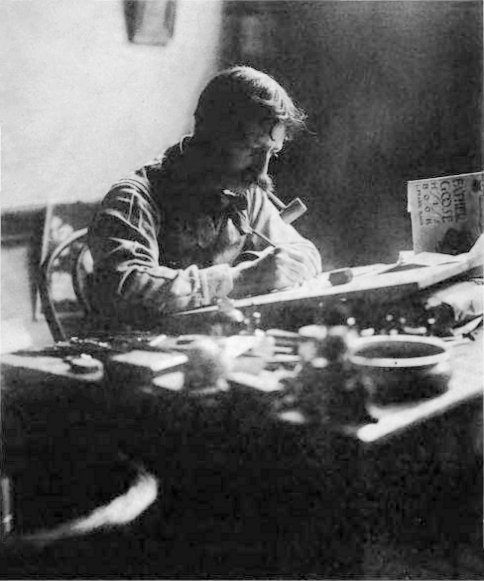
Illustrator W. W. Denslow sketching circa 1900

The original illustrator of the novel, W. W. Denslow, aided in the development of Baum's story and greatly influenced the way it has been interpreted. Baum and Denslow had a close working relationship and worked together to create the presentation of the story through the images and the text. Color is an important element of the story and is present throughout the images, with each chapter having a different color representation. Denslow also added characteristics to his drawings that Baum never described. For example, Denslow drew a house and the gates of the Emerald City with faces on them.

In the later Oz books, John R. Neill, who illustrated all the sequels, continued to use elements from Denslow's earlier illustrations, including faces on the Emerald City's gates. Another aspect is the Tin Woodman's funnel hat, which is not mentioned in the text until later books but appears in most artists' interpretation of the character, including the stage and film productions of 1902–1909, 1908, 1910, 1914, 1925, 1931, 1933, 1939, 1982, 1985, 1988, 1992, and others. One of the earliest illustrators not to include a funnel hat was Russell H. Schulz in the 1957 Whitman Publishing edition—Schulz depicted him wearing a pot on his head. Libico Maraja's illustrations, which first appeared in a 1957 Italian edition and have also appeared in English-language and other editions, are well known for depicting him bareheaded.

== Critical response ==
This last story of The Wizard is ingeniously woven out of commonplace material. It is, of course, an extravaganza, but will surely be found to appeal strongly to child readers as well as to the younger children, to whom it will be read by mothers or those having charge of the entertaining of children. There seems to be an inborn love of stories in child minds, and one of the most familiar and pleading requests of children is to be told another story.

The drawing as well as the introduced color work vies with the texts drawn, and the result has been a book that rises far above the average children's book of today, high as is the present standard...

The book has a bright and joyous atmosphere, and does not dwell upon killing and deeds of violence. Enough stirring adventure enters into it, however, to flavor it with zest, and it will indeed be strange if there be a normal child who will not enjoy the story.

— The New York Times, September 8, 1900

The Wonderful Wizard of Oz received positive critical reviews upon release. In a September 1900 review, The New York Times praised the novel, writing that it would appeal to child readers and to younger children who could not read yet. The review also praised the illustrations for being a pleasant complement to the text.

During the subsequent decades after the novel's publication in 1900, it received little critical analysis from scholars of children's literature. Lists of suggested reading published for juvenile readers never contained Baum's work, and his works were rarely assigned in classrooms. This lack of interest stemmed from the scholars' misgivings about fantasy, as well as to their belief that lengthy series had little literary merit.

It frequently came under fire in later decades. In 1957, the director of Detroit's libraries banned The Wonderful Wizard of Oz for having "no value" for children of today, for supporting "negativism", and for bringing children's minds to a "cowardly level". Professor Russel B. Nye of Michigan State University countered that "if the message of the Oz books—love, kindness, and unselfishness make the world a better place—seems of no value today", then maybe the time is ripe for "reassess[ing] a good many other things besides the Detroit library's approved list of children's books".

In 1986, seven Fundamentalist Christian families in Tennessee opposed the novel's inclusion in the public school syllabus and filed a lawsuit. They based their opposition to the novel on its depicting benevolent witches and promoting the belief that integral human attributes were "individually developed rather than God-given". One parent said: "I do not want my children seduced into godless supernaturalism." Other reasons included the novel's teaching that females are equal to males and that animals are personified and can speak. The judge ruled that when the novel was being discussed in class, the parents were allowed to have their children leave the classroom.

In April 2000, the Library of Congress declared The Wonderful Wizard of Oz to be "America's greatest and best-loved homegrown fairytale", also naming it the first American fantasy for children and one of the most-read children's books. Leonard Everett Fisher of The Horn Book Magazine wrote in 2000 that Oz has "a timeless message from a less complex era, and it continues to resonate". The challenge of valuing oneself during impending adversity has not, Fisher noted, lessened during the prior 100 years. Two years later, in a 2002 review, Bill Delaney of Salem Press praised Baum for giving children the opportunity to discover magic in the mundane things in their everyday lives. He further commended Baum for teaching "millions of children to love reading during their crucial formative years". In 2012 it was ranked number 41 on a list of the top 100 children's novels published by School Library Journal.

== Editions ==
L. Frank Baum - The Patchwork Girl of Oz (1920 printing), John R. Neill cover art

After George M. Hill's bankruptcy in 1902, copyright in the book passed to the Bowen-Merrill Company of Indianapolis, which published most of Baum's other books from 1901 to 1903, both reprints (Father Goose, His Book, The Magical Monarch of Mo, American Fairy Tales, Dot and Tot of Merryland) and new works (The Master Key, The Army Alphabet, The Navy Alphabet, The Life and Adventures of Santa Claus, The Enchanted Island of Yew, The Songs of Father Goose). Bowen-Merrill's 1903 edition initially had the title The New Wizard of Oz, to distinguish it from the 1902 musical, which was by then better known than the original book and had a very different story. The word "New" was quickly dropped in subsequent printings, leaving the now-familiar shortened title, The Wizard of Oz, and some minor textual changes were added, such as to "yellow daises", and changing a chapter title from "The Rescue" to "How the Four Were Reunited". The editions they published lacked most of the in-text color and color plates of the original. Many cost-cutting measures were implemented, including removal of some of the color printing without replacing it with black, printing nothing rather than the beard of the Soldier with the Green Whiskers.

When Baum filed for bankruptcy after his critically and popularly successful film and stage production The Fairylogue and Radio-Plays failed to make back its production costs, Baum lost the rights to all of the books published by what was now called Bobbs-Merrill, and they were licensed to the M. A. Donahue Company, which printed them in significantly cheaper "blotting paper" editions with advertising that directly competed with Baum's more recent books, published by the Reilly & Britton Company, from which he was making his living, explicitly hurting sales of The Patchwork Girl of Oz, the new Oz book for 1913, to boost sales of Wizard, which Donahue called in a full-page ad in The Publishers' Weekly (June 28, 1913), Baum's "one pre-eminently great Juvenile Book". In a letter to Baum dated December 31, 1914, F. K. Reilly lamented that the average buyer employed by a retail store would not understand why he should be expected to spend 75 cents for a copy of Tik-Tok of Oz when he could buy a copy of Wizard for between 33 and 36 cents. Baum had previously written a letter complaining about the Donahue deal, which he did not know about until it was fait accompli, and one of the investors who held The Wizard of Oz rights had inquired why the royalty was only five or six cents per copy, depending on quantity sold, which made no sense to Baum.

A new edition from Bobbs-Merrill in 1949 illustrated by Evelyn Copelman, again titled The New Wizard of Oz, paid lip service to Denslow but was based strongly, apart from the Lion, on the MGM movie. Copelman had illustrated a new edition of The Magical Monarch of Mo two years earlier.

It was not until the book entered the public domain in 1956 that new editions, either with the original color plates, or new illustrations, proliferated. A revised version of Copelman's artwork was published in a Grosset & Dunlap edition, and Reilly & Lee (formerly Reilly & Britton) published an edition in line with the Oz sequels, which had previously treated The Marvelous Land of Oz as the first Oz book, not having the publication rights to Wizard, with new illustrations by Dale Ulrey. Ulrey had previously illustrated Jack Snow's Jaglon and the Tiger-Faries, an expansion of a Baum short story "The Story of Jaglon", and a 1955 edition of The Tin Woodman of Oz, though both sold poorly. Later Reilly & Lee editions used Denslow's original illustrations.

Notable more recent editions are the 1986 Pennyroyal edition illustrated by Barry Moser, which was reprinted by the University of California Press, and the 2000 The Annotated Wizard of Oz edited by Michael Patrick Hearn (heavily revised from a 1972 edition that was printed in a wide format that allowed for it to be a facsimile of the original edition with notes and additional illustrations at the sides), which was published by W. W. Norton and included all the original color illustrations, as well as supplemental artwork by Denslow. Other centennial editions included University Press of Kansas's Kansas Centennial Edition, illustrated by Michael McCurdy with black-and-white illustrations, and Robert Sabuda's pop-up book.

== Sequels ==
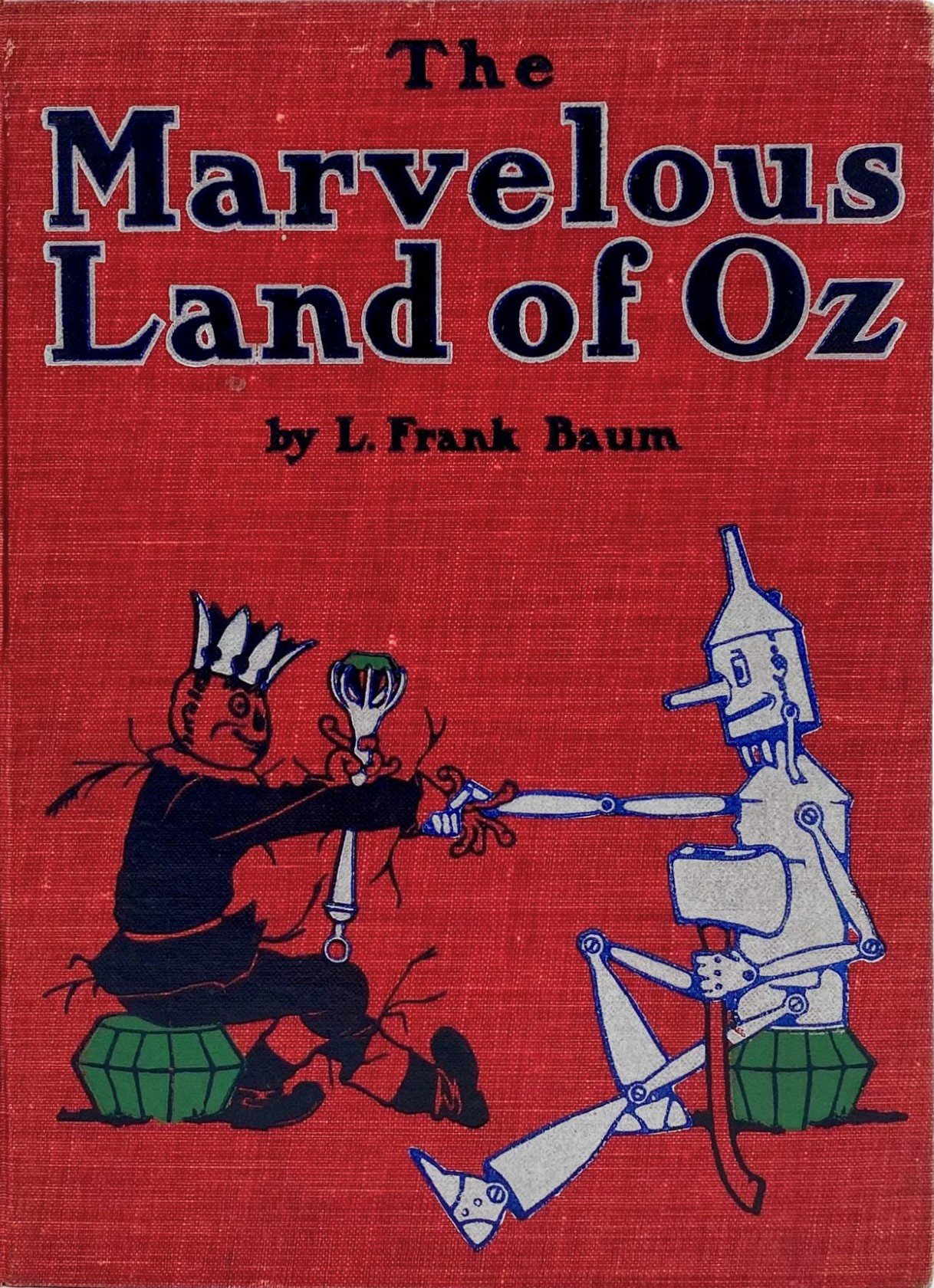
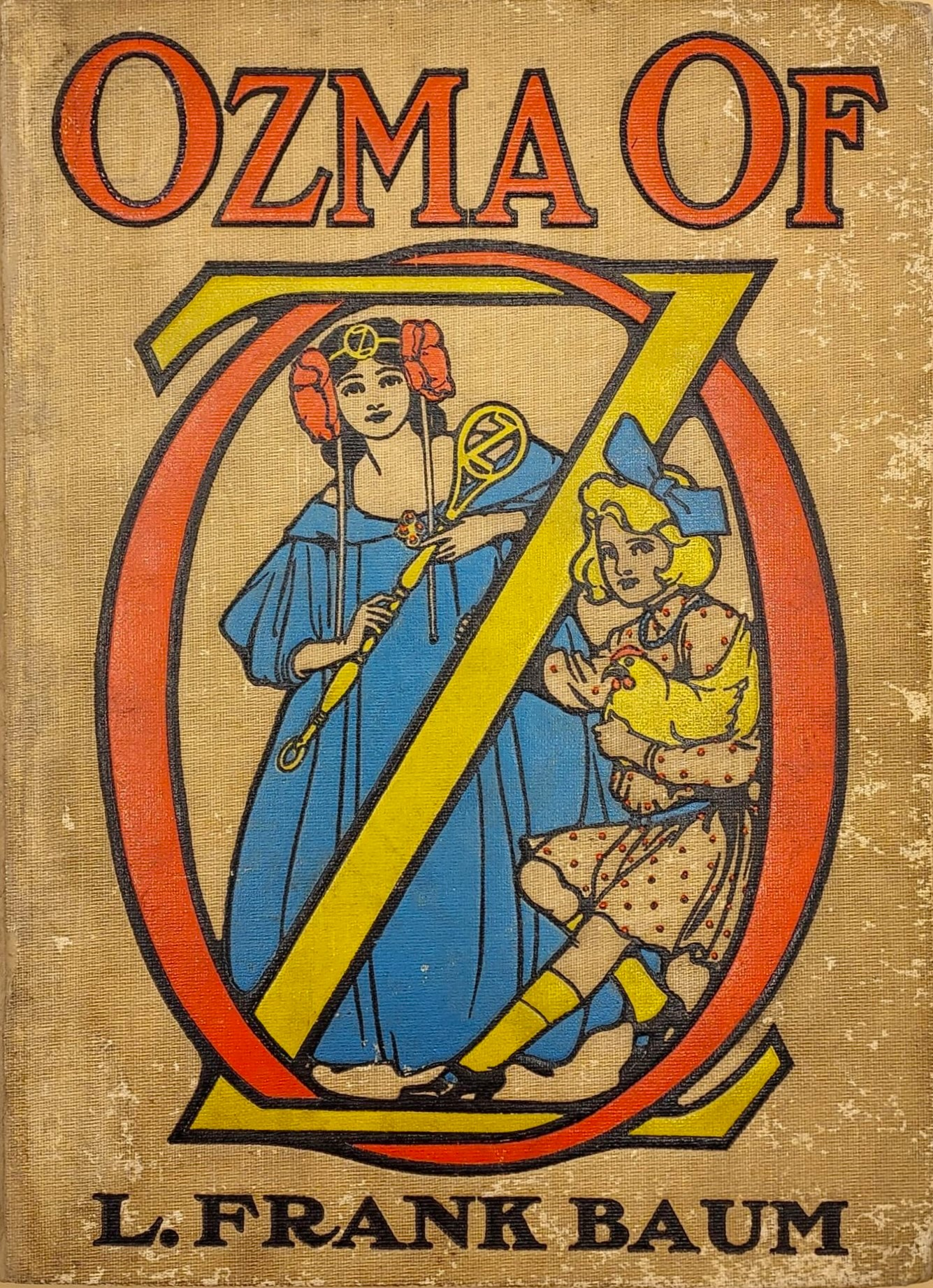
The Marvelous Land of Oz (1904) and Ozma of Oz (1907) were the next entries in the series.

Baum wrote The Wonderful Wizard of Oz without any thought of a sequel. After reading the novel, thousands of children wrote letters to him, requesting that he craft another story about Oz. In 1904, amid financial difficulties, Baum wrote and published the first sequel, The Marvelous Land of Oz, declaring that he grudgingly wrote the sequel to address the popular demand. He dedicated the book to stage actors Fred Stone and David C. Montgomery who played the characters of the Scarecrow and the Tin Woodman on stage. Baum wrote large roles for the Scarecrow and Tin Woodman that he deleted from the stage version, The Woggle-Bug, after Montgomery and Stone had balked at leaving a successful show to do a sequel.

Baum later wrote sequels in 1907, 1908, and 1909. In his 1910 The Emerald City of Oz, he wrote that he could not continue writing sequels because Ozland had lost contact with the rest of the world. The children refused to accept this story, so Baum, in 1913 and every year thereafter until his death in May 1919, wrote an Oz book, ultimately writing 13 sequels and half a dozen Oz short stories.

Baum explained the purpose of his novels in a note he penned to his sister, Mary Louise Brewster, in a copy of Mother Goose in Prose (1897), his first book. He wrote: "To please a child is a sweet and a lovely thing that warms one's heart and brings its own reward." After Baum's death in 1919, Baum's publishers delegated the creation of more sequels to Ruth Plumly Thompson who wrote 21. An original Oz book was published every Christmas between 1913 and 1942. By 1956, five million copies of the Oz books had been published in the English language, while hundreds of thousands had been published in eight foreign languages.

== Adaptations ==
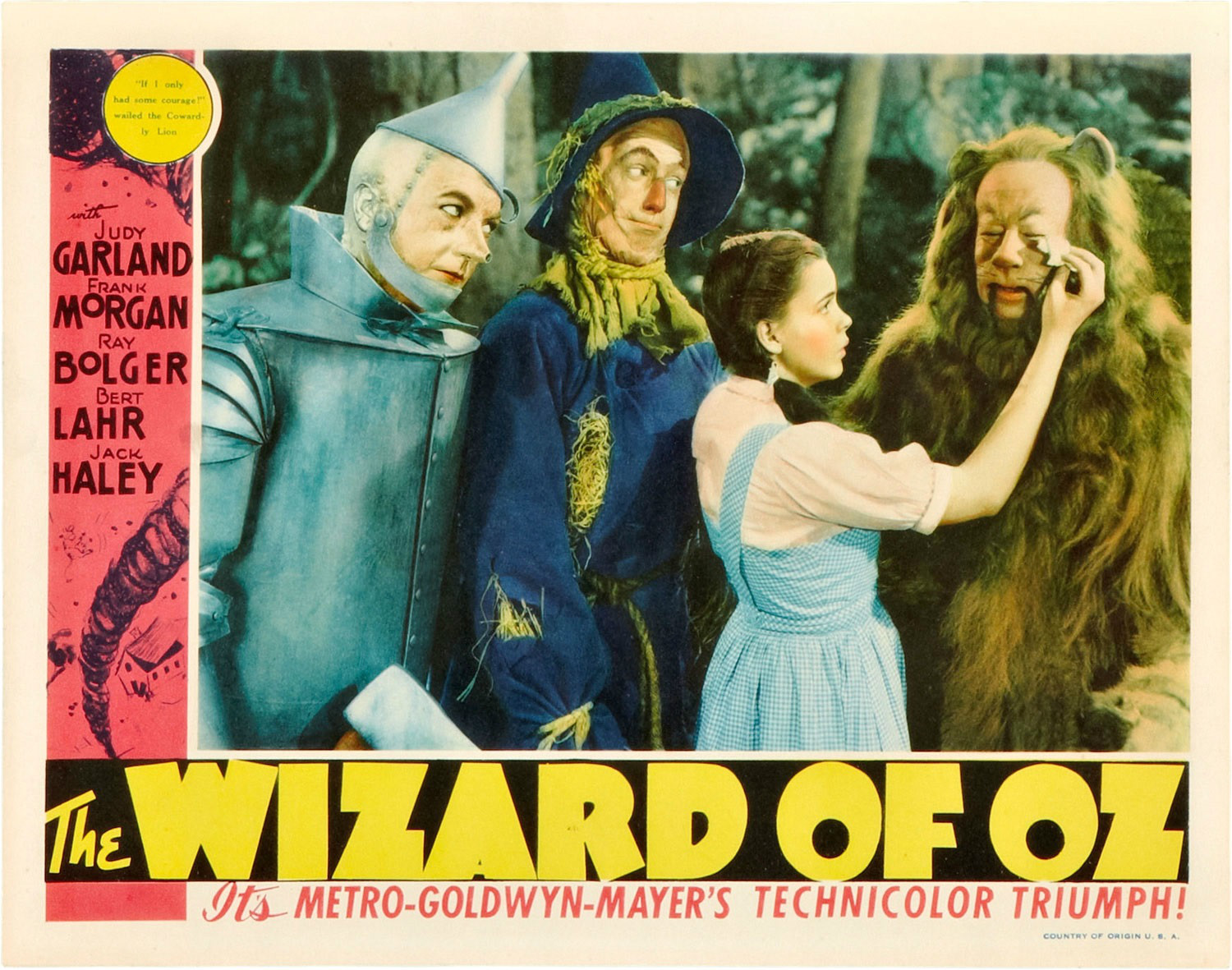
Lobby card for the 1939 film adaptation, The Wizard of Oz

The Wonderful Wizard of Oz has been adapted to other media numerous times. Within several decades after its publication, the book had inspired a number of stage and screen adaptations, including a profitable 1902 Broadway musical and three silent films. The most popular cinematic adaptation of the story is The Wizard of Oz, the 1939 film starring Judy Garland, Ray Bolger, Jack Haley, and Bert Lahr. The 1939 film was considered innovative because of its special effects and revolutionary use of Technicolor.

The story has been translated into other languages (at least once without permission, resulting in Alexander Volkov's The Wizard of the Emerald City novel and its sequels, which were translated into English by Sergei Sukhinov) and adapted into comics several times. Following the lapse of the original copyright, the characters have been adapted and reused in spin-offs, unofficial sequels, and reinterpretations, some of which have been controversial in their treatment of Baum's characters.

== Influence and legacy ==
The Wonderful Wizard of Oz has become an established part of multiple cultures, spreading from its early young American readership to becoming known throughout the world. It has been translated or adapted into nearly every major language, at times being modified in local variations. For instance, in some abridged Indian editions, the Tin Woodman was replaced with a horse. In Russia, a translation by Alexander Melentyevich Volkov produced six books, The Wizard of the Emerald City series, which became progressively distanced from the Baum version, as Ellie and her dog Totoshka travel throughout the Magic Land. The 1939 film adaptation has become a classic of popular culture, shown annually on American television from 1959 to 1998 and then several times a year every year beginning in 1999.

In 1974, the story was re-envisioned as The Wiz, a Tony Award winning musical featuring an all-Black cast and set in the context of modern African-American culture. This musical was adapted in 1978 as the feature film The Wiz, a musical adventure fantasy produced by Universal Pictures and Motown Productions.

There were several Hebrew translations published in Israel. As established in the first translation and kept in later ones, the book's Land of Oz was rendered in Hebrew as Eretz Uz (ארץ עוץ)—i.e. the same as the original Hebrew name of the Biblical Land of Uz, homeland of Job. Thus, for Hebrew readers, this translators' choice added a layer of Biblical connotations absent from the English original.

In 2018, "The Lost Art of Oz" project was initiated to locate and catalogue the surviving original artwork that John R. Neill, W. W. Denslow, Frank Kramer, Richard "Dirk" Gringhuis, and Dick Martin had created to illustrate the Oz book series. In 2020, an Esperanto translation of the novel was used by a team of scientists to demonstrate a new method for encoding text in DNA that remains readable after repeated copying.

== Allegorical analysis ==
This book seems to follow Joseph Campbell's a "Hero with a thousand faces"/"monomyth" theme. "To see The Wonderful Wizard of Oz simply as Dorothy's quest for a way to return to Kansas is to miss many of the sources of the books' strength, for like most quest heroes, Dorothy achieves far more than simply finding her way home." "The Wizard of Oz follows the course of the hero's journey in the structure of 'Departure', 'Initiation', and 'Return' which Campbell describes in The Hero with a Thousand Faces".

=== Allusions to 19th-century America ===
Many decades after its publication, Baum's work gave rise to various political interpretations, particularly regarding the 19th-century Populist movement in the United States. In a 1964 American Quarterly article titled "The Wizard of Oz: Parable on Populism", educator Henry Littlefield posited that the book served an allegory for the late 19th-century bimetallism debate regarding monetary policy. Littlefield's thesis achieved some support but was widely criticized by others. Other political interpretations soon followed. In 1971, historian Richard J. Jensen theorized in The Winning of the Midwest that "Oz" was derived from the common abbreviation for "ounce", used for denoting quantities of gold and silver.

== See also ==
- 1900 in literature
- The Baum Bugle
- Dorothy and the Wizard of Oz
- Wizard of Oz Club
- Lost in Oz (TV series)
- Tin Man (miniseries)
- Wicked
- The Wiz

The Oz books
| Previous book: N/A | The Wonderful Wizard of Oz; 1900 | Next book: The Marvelous Land of Oz |
