= Mother Goose in Prose =

1897 collection of children's stories written by L. Frank Baum

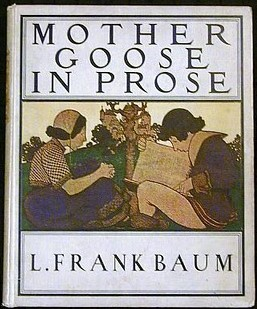
- First edition (1897)
- Author: L. Frank Baum
- Illustrator: Maxfield Parrish
- Language: English
- Genre: Children's literature
- Publisher: Way & Williams (1897); George M. Hill (1901); Bobbs-Merrill (1905)
- Publication date: 1897
- Publication place: United States
- Media type: Print (hardback & paperback)
- Pages: 265

Mother Goose in Prose is a collection of twenty-two children's stories based on Mother Goose nursery rhymes. It was the first children's book written by L. Frank Baum, and the first book illustrated by Maxfield Parrish. It was originally published in 1897 by Way and Williams of Chicago, and re-released by the George M. Hill Company in 1901.

== Contents ==
The book opens with an introduction by Baum that traces the history of Mother Goose. It is followed by the original text of a nursery rhyme with a broader story to establish its literary context.

- Sing a Song o' Sixpence
- The Story of Little Boy Blue
- The Cat and the Fiddle
- Black Sheep
- Old King Cole
- Mistress Mary
- The Wond'rous Wise Man
- What Jack Horner Did
- The Man in the Moon
- The Jolly Miller
- The Little Man and His Little Gun
- Hickory, Dickory, Dock
- Little Bo-Peep
- The Story of Tommy Tucker
- Pussy-cat Mew
- How the Beggars Came to Town
- Tom, Tom, the Piper's Son
- Humpty Dumpty
- The Woman Who Lived in a Shoe
- Little Miss Muffet
- Three Wise Men of Gotham
- Little Bun Rabbit

The book's last selection features a girl named Dorothy who can talk to animals—an anticipation of the Oz books. When Baum later included this story in his Juvenile Speaker (1910) and The Snuggle Tales (1916–17), he changed the girl's name to Doris, to avoid confusing her with Dorothy Gale.

Though handsomely produced, Mother Goose in Prose was priced relatively expensively for a children's book; it was "only moderately successful" commercially. Publisher Way and Williams went bankrupt a year later. Baum took a different approach in a subsequent venture, composing original verses for his Father Goose: His Book in 1899.

== Later editions ==
New editions of Mother Goose in Prose appeared from Bounty Books in 1951 and after (ISBN 0-517-51904-6), Dover Publications in 2002, and Kessinger Publishing in 2004, among others.

== Adaptation ==
The Jim Henson Company made a TV series based on the book called Jim Henson's Mother Goose Stories (1990).
