= George M. Hill Company =

American publishing company

- Status: Defunct
- Founded: 1893; 133 years ago
- Founder: George M. Hill
- Country of origin: United States
- Headquarters location: Chicago, Illinois, U.S.
- Publication types: books

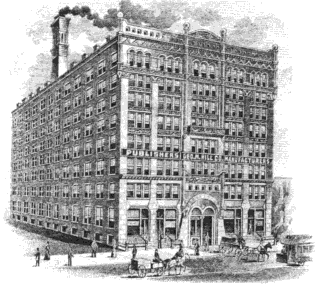
The George M. Hill Company in 1900

George M. Hill Company was an American publishing company based in Chicago, Illinois. It was founded in 1893 by George M. Hill, who learned the book-binding trade through an apprenticeship.

In 1901, the company's main offerings were children's novels authored by L. Frank Baum. It sold Dot and Tot of Merryland and American Fairy Tales and also acquired the right to republish Mother Goose in Prose in "popular-priced form".

The company also published a reprint of the 1847 edition of Webster's Dictionary, which was out of copyright. In 1902, it purchased the right from the G. & C. Merriam Company (now called Merriam-Webster) to publish the 1864 unabridged edition of the dictionary with an additional 10,000 words from the 1879 version.

Compelled to declare bankruptcy in March 1902, the company had, a few weeks earlier, decided to enlarge its operations and erect a new building. On April 26, Robert O. Law was selected by the court to be the interim trustee. Law authorized the selling of George M. Hill Company's property. On March 29, Publishers Weekly reported the sale of hundreds of plates (Note: Plates are illustrations in books, either black and white or color. They are usually on pages of paper of different quality from the text pages.) and juvenile books, including books that had yet to be published and Baum's works. Despite Hill's attempts to repossess his company, the George W. Ogilvie Company was established on May 8 to manage its holdings. Having purchased Hill's manufacturing plant, C. O. Owen & Co. resold it to the Hill Bindery Company, which was newly created and managed by George Hill.

== Father Goose and The Wonderful Wizard of Oz ==
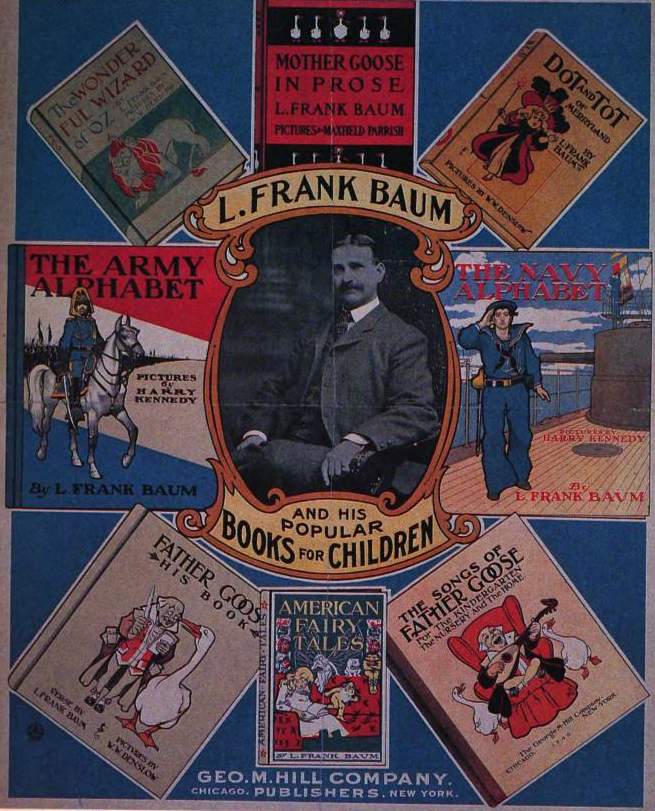
1901 poster from Hill advertising books by L. Frank Baum

L. Frank Baum and W. W. Denslow wanted to publish Father Goose in color. Because few publishers would spend the money to have the book's illustrations done as they desired, they searched for a company to manufacture the book. Denslow had previous involvement with George M. Hill Company. He and Baum brought the drafts of their novel to Hill in the hopes that the company would make samples for them. Hill not only complied, but he also promised to publish it if Baum and Denslow paid for the color plates.

The book's initial printing was 5,700 copies which rapidly sold out. Subsequent printings were also immediately sold out, and Father Goose came to be the bestselling picture book in 1900. In 1900, Hill also published The Songs of Father Goose, a compilation of black-and-white pages from the original book that was complemented by music from Albert N. Hall.

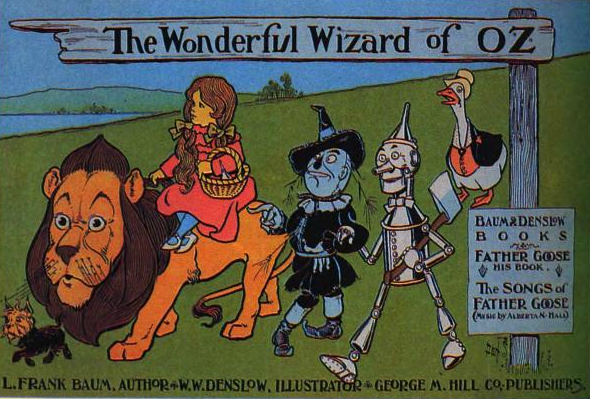
1900 poster advertising The Wonderful Wizard of Oz

Hill gave Baum and Denslow a $1,000 advance to be shared equally on The Emerald City. Later the title was later changed to The Wonderful Wizard of Oz. In their contract, every time the book was sold at the suggested retail price of $1.50, the author and illustrator would each receive a royalty of nine cents. The contract also gave Hill "the exclusive right of publication of any books or literary works which they may jointly produce, write or illustrate, during a period of five years from the date of the agreement". That portion of the contract was later dissolved by agreement of all parties because Hill failed to fulfill another part of the contract. Though Hill pledged to publish the book in England, Baum later said it was "never done."

== See also ==
- Books in the United States
