= A Lickpenny Lover =

1908 short story by O.Henry

"A Lickpenny Lover" is a short story by O.Henry, with his usual twist ending. This story was published in 1908.

== Synopsis ==
Like many of O. Henry's stories, this story too explores the connection between love and money in people's relations. A 29 year old millionaire Irving Carter visits a store named "Biggest Store" and immediately falls in love with one of the 3,000 sales girls there - an 18 year old beautiful blonde Masie. He requests her to meet him outside shop and she agrees. Masie is as poor, as Irving is rich, and marrying him would be dream of any girl. In one of their meetings, as Irving promises her to show the world after marriage, she gets up - as if fed-up - and calls off the meeting. The next day, she tells one of her friends at the store that she has ended her relationship with Irving because he wanted to take her to Coney Island after their wedding.

== Interpretation ==
Once again, this is a very difficult story to interpret, and has many layers of meanings. A simple and very basic interpretation is that when Irving was surmising about taking her after wedding to the temples of India, the Japanese gardens and the camel trains and chariot races in Persia, she simply thought he wanted to take her to Coney island. That is as far as she could see and understand the world - she being too poor. In this interpretation Masie is seen as a girl, for whom money was more than love. She wanted more than just going to Coney island.

Another - a more sublime - interpretation is that Masie never found any hint of love in Irving's talks. She found only a "show-off" and so she spurned him, knowing fully well that she was rejecting a real rich person as a possible husband. She did not want money - she wanted love. So she rejected him.

Interestingly in each interpretation the character of Masie is interpreted in a diagonally opposite manner. In the first interpretation she comes out as a mean girl, who wants money more than love. In the latter interpretation, she comes out having a sublime character, who wants love more than money.
