= Maltese cat =

Cat coat colour

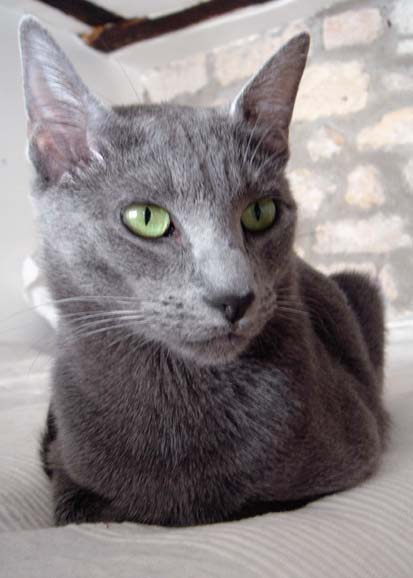
The Russian Blue is one of a number of cat breeds whose fur is always Maltese all over.

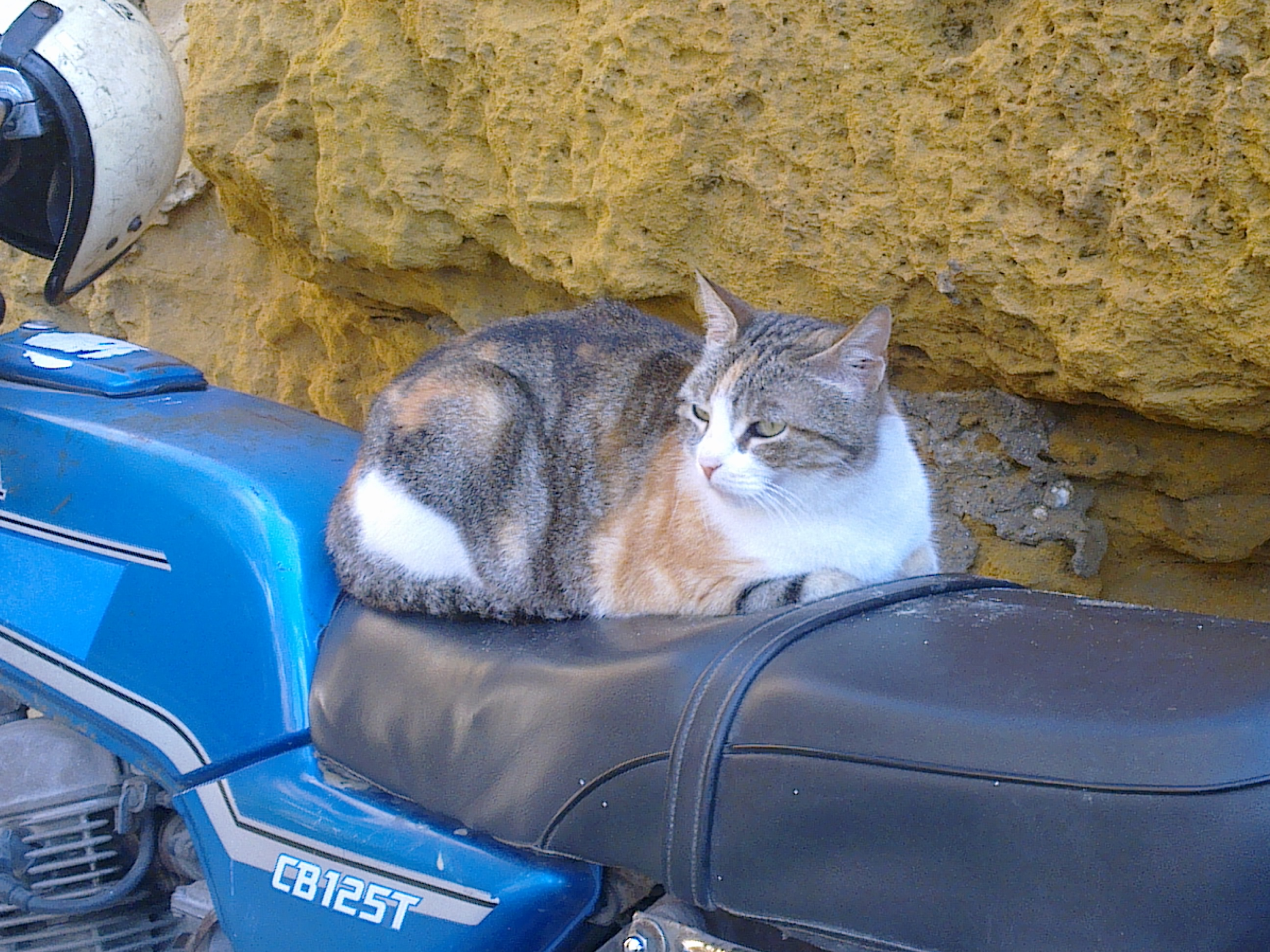
A Maltese cat with calico markings resting outside The Citadella, Gozo in Malta.

A Maltese cat is any whose fur is completely or primarily grey (often called "blue" by cat fanciers) and regardless of breed. Maltese is a coat-colour term, not a breed name.

== Description ==
There is some evidence of a historical breed with such colouration that existed in Malta, which may have given rise to the use of the adjective in this context.

There are several cat breeds that always produce "blue" or grey fur, of whom the adjective may be used. These are the Russian Blue, the Chartreux and the Korat, none of which are associated with Malta. There are several other breeds that often produce blues such as the British Shorthair whose blue variant is called the "British Blue".

Regardless of breed, any cat with solid grey colouration has two pairs of double-recessive genes for the non-agouti and colour-dilution traits, and so an exclusive mating between two solid grey cats should always produce solid grey kittens.

== Cultural references ==
In literature, "The Maltese Cat" is the title of a 1895 short story (in the collection "The Day's Work") by Rudyard Kipling. The story is about a polo match set in British colonial India, told from the point of view of one of the ponies, a grey named the Maltese Cat.

Patrick Leigh Fermor alludes to this usage in 1986's Between the Woods and the Water where, after a game of bicycle polo at a country house on the Great Hungarian Plain, he refers to the bicycles as "Maltese Cats": "The other side won but we scored four goals, and when the iron Maltese Cats were back in their stands, we limped back to the steps, where Countess Denise and ... had been leaning on the balustrade like ladies gazing down into the lists."

O. Henry alludes to a Maltese cat in his 1908 story A Lickpenny Lover as being "secretive and wary" when he compares the protagonist - an 18 year old girl Masie - to it.

A Maltese cat comes into the kitchen where main character Jim Burden is taking a bath on his first day at his grandparents' Nebraska farm in Willa Cather's 1918 novel My Ántonia.

== See also ==
- Cat coat genetics
