= Way and Williams Publishers =

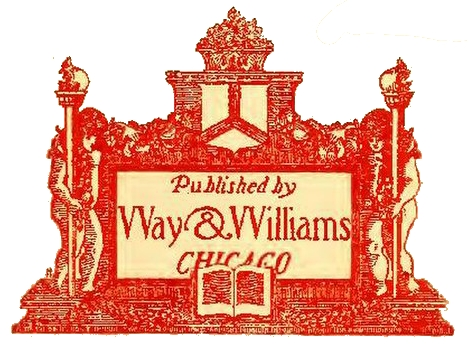
- Status: Defunct
- Predecessor: W. Irving Way and Company
- Founded: 1895
- Founder: Washington Irving Way Chauncey L. Williams
- Country of origin: United States
- Headquarters location: Chicago
- Publication types: Books

Way and Williams, Publishers was officially established in 1895 by Chauncey L. Williams, a former advertiser. The firm was preceded by W. Irving Way and Company, a small publishing-bookselling company begun by Way in 1892. The new firm designated itself "Way and Williams, Publishers, Importers, and Booksellers."

Way and Williams joined fifty-three other publishing firms in Chicago, but were determined to be unique. They shared a vision of producing finely printed books in limited editions. Although the firm lasted only three years, from 1895 to 1898, and produced only sixty-six books, many of its titles are visually impressive and represent the work of some of the major artists and book designers of the period. There was a heavy emphasis on British imports among the earlier titles, but gradually the emphasis shifted to American writers; and many prominent authors saw their books come to life with a Way and Williams imprint.

The firm published both well-known and relatively obscure authors, many of them from the Chicago literary scene. Among the better-known writers represented by the firm were Kate Chopin, Charles Fletcher Lummis, Dante Gabriel Rossetti, William Allen White, Octave Thanet (Alice French), Edgar Lee Masters, and L. Frank Baum; and their works were often shown to advantage by the artistic input of Bruce Rogers, Maxfield Parrish, Will Bradley, and Frank Hazenplug, among others.

In December 1896, Chauncey Williams became the sole owner of the firm, although the name of Way and Williams remained. Irving Way subsequently reestablished his old firm, W. Irving Way, Publisher and Seller of Books. The firm closed in 1898.
