= Alderbrook =

Alderbrook may refer to:

- Alderbrook (horse), a racehorse

== Organisations ==
- Alderbrook Resort & Spa, resort hotel on Hood Canal in Washington State
- Alderbrook Secondary School, in Solihull, England
- Alderbrook Winery, in California, US
- Alderbrook Press, publisher of The Lemberg Mosaic

== Places ==
Communities

- Alderbrook (East Sussex), England, in the List of United Kingdom locations: Al
- Alderbrook, New Hampshire, U.S., a former hamlet (c.1844–1909)

Other

- Alderbrook, a mansion in Riverdale, New York City, U.S.
- Alderbrook Farmhouse, in the National Register of Historic Places listings in San Juan County, Washington, U.S.
- Alderbrook Park, Surrey, England, built by Richard Norman Shaw
- Alderbrook Recreation Ground, home of Crowborough Athletic F.C., England
- Union Fishermen's Cooperative Packing Company Alderbrook Station, in the National Register of Historic Places listings in Clatsop County, Oregon, U.S.

== See also ==
- Brook alder, Alnus maritima a species of plant in the family Betulaceae
- Alder Brook, a river near Degrasse, New York
- Alder Brook (West Branch French Creek tributary), a stream in Pennsylvania
- Alderbrink Press, a Chicago book publisher
