= Ralph Fletcher Seymour =

American artist, author, and publisher

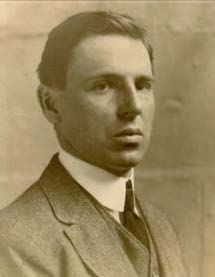
- Photo of Ralph Fletcher Seymour (1912)
- Born: March 18, 1876; Milan, Illinois
- Died: January 1, 1966 (aged 89); Batavia, Illinois
- Known for: Illustrator, author, publisher

Ralph Fletcher Seymour (March 18, 1876 – January 1, 1966) was an American artist, author, and publisher of the late nineteenth and the twentieth centuries. Though long based in Chicago, he was also noted for his work in the American Southwest; he studied, wrote about, and portrayed the Native American cultures of the region.

== Life and work ==
Seymour was born in Milan, Illinois, and studied in Cincinnati with Lewis Meakin and Vincent Nowattny, and later in Paris as well. He taught decorative illustration at the Art Institute of Chicago, and was an artist-in-residence at Knox College. He painted, and produced etchings, woodcuts and block prints. He was a noted designer of bookplates.

For a time around the turn of the twentieth century, Seymour was associated with L. Frank Baum, and worked on Baum's books By the Candelabra's Glare (1898), Father Goose: His Book (1899), and American Fairy Tales (1901). Seymour illustrated or designed a range of books, often in high-quality limited editions, including Elizabeth Barrett Browning's Sonnets from the Portuguese (1899), John Keats's The Eve of St. Agnes (1900), John Milton's Ode on the Morning of Christ's Nativity (1901), Percy Bysshe Shelley's A Defence of Poetry (1904), the Biblical Book of Ruth (1904), and William Blake's Songs of Innocence and Experience (1906).

For almost seven decades, Seymour ran his own book publishing firm in Chicago. Among the works he published were Frank Lloyd Wright's The Japanese Print (1912) and Experimenting with Human Lives (1923), and Alice Corbin's Red Earth: Poems of New Mexico (1920). He published Henry Blake Fuller's Bertram Cope's Year (1919), a novel about homosexuals in Chicago and an early example of gay literature in America. Seymour's Alderbrink Press maintained traditions of the Arts and Crafts Movement into the 1950s.

Seymour wrote Across the Gulf (1928), about his travels in southern Mexico — another expression of his interest in Native American cultures. He also published his own account of his life and art, in which he stated that the Chicago artists of his generation saw themselves as "peculiarly American" practitioners who disregarded "European, eastern or conventional rules for guidance in saying what they wanted to say."

=== Bookplates by Ralph Seymour Fletcher ===
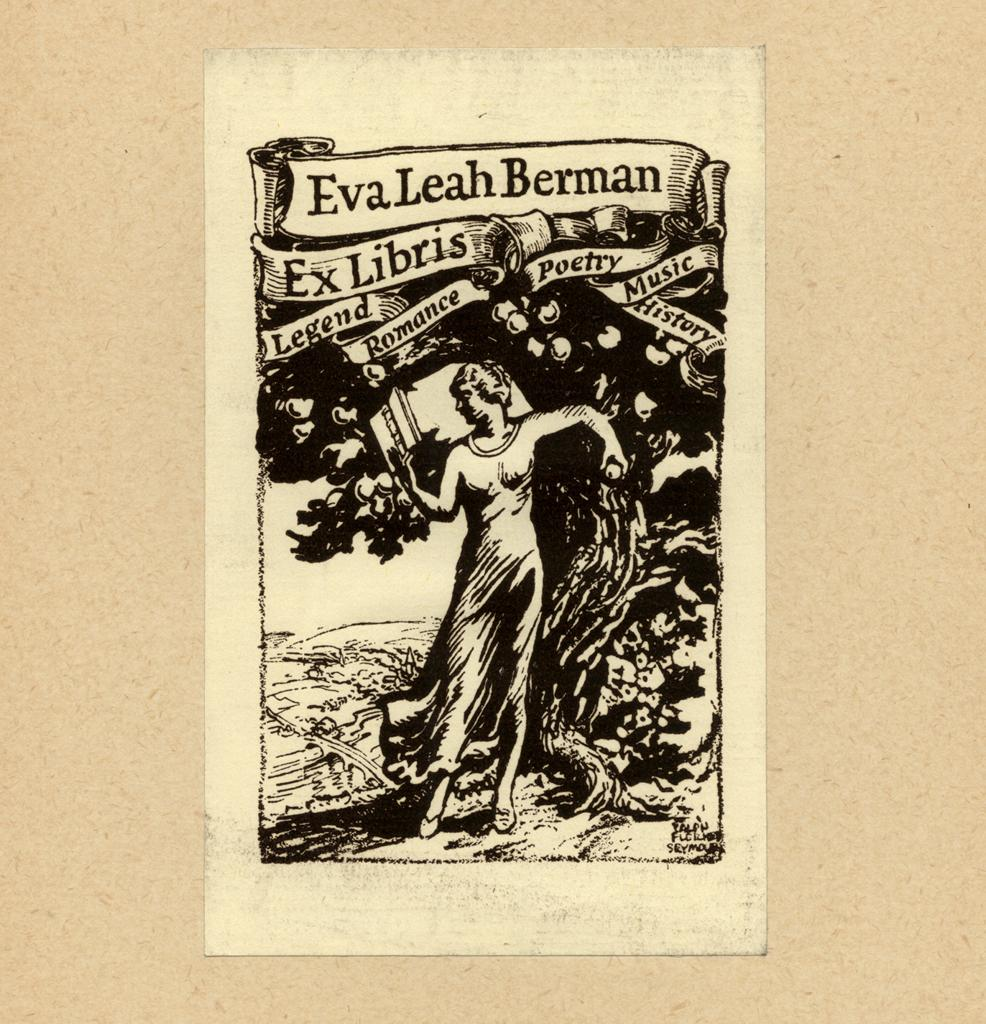
Bookplate for Eva Leah Berman

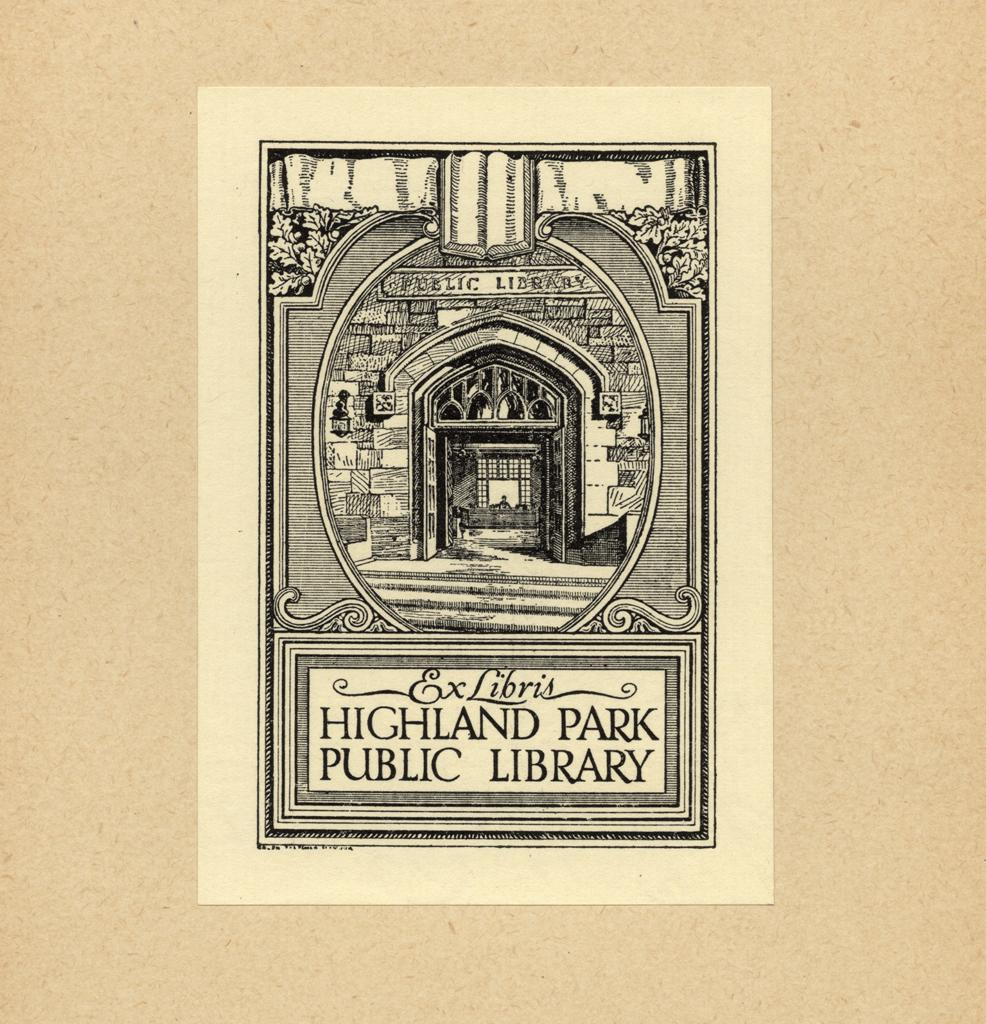
Bookplate for the Highland Park Public Library

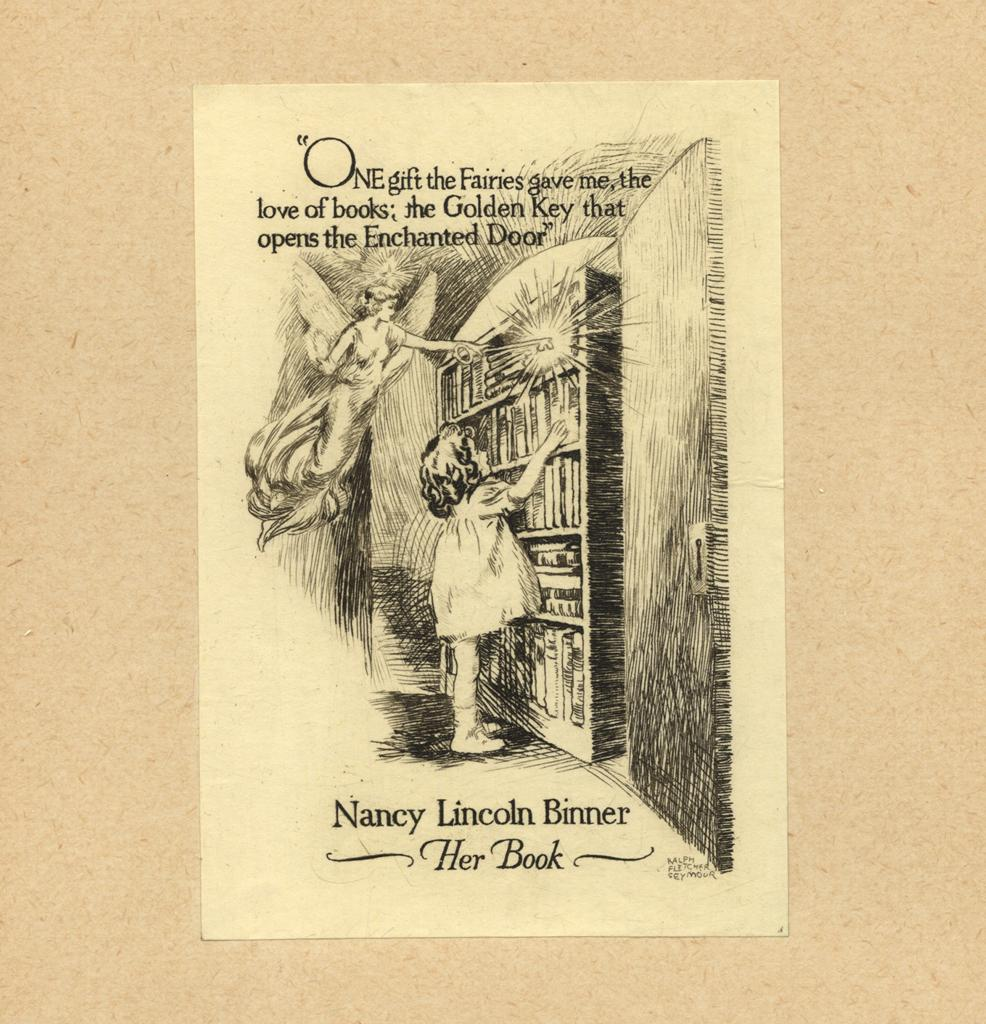
Bookplate for Nancy Lincoln Binner

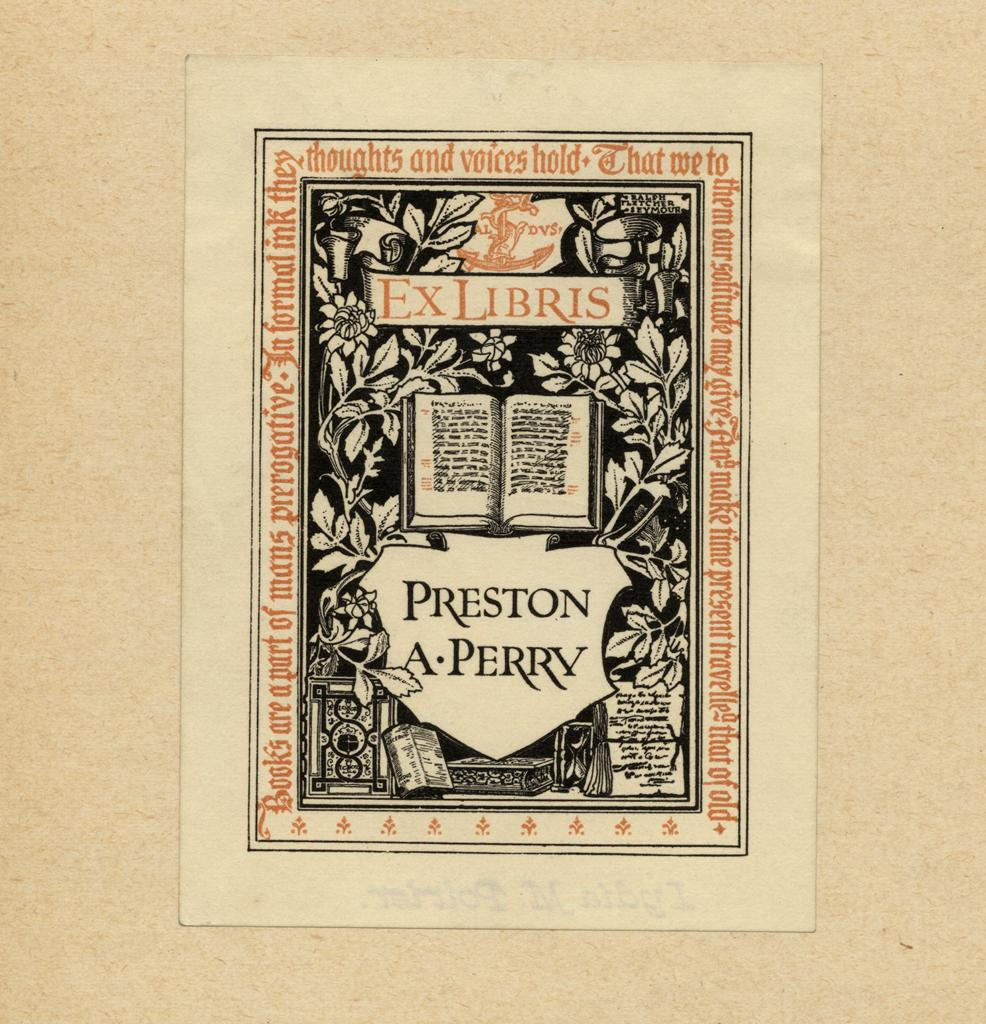
Colored bookplate for Preston A. Perry

== Death ==
He died in Batavia, Illinois in 1966, at the age of 89.
