= Highland Park Public Library =

Highland Park Public Library may refer to:

- Highland Park Public Library (Illinois) in Highland Park, Illinois, U.S.
- Highland Park Public Library (Texas) in Highland Park, Texas, U.S.
