= Bertram Cope's Year =

1919 novel by Henry Blake Fuller

Bertram Cope's Year: A Novel
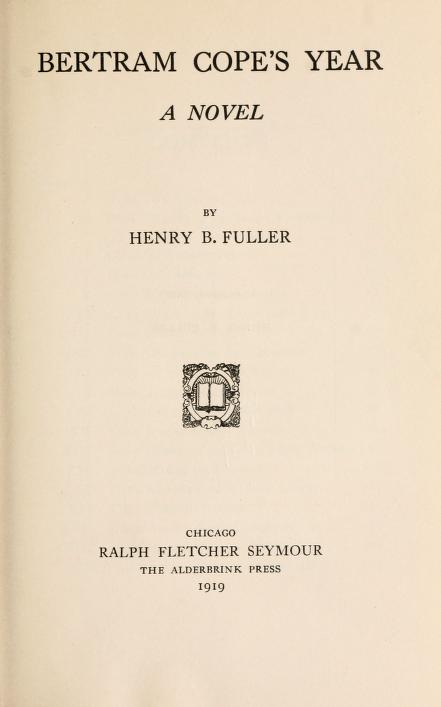
- Original title page
- Author: Henry B. Fuller
- Language: English
- Publisher: Alderbrink Press
- Publication date: 1919
- Publication place: United States
- Media type: Print
- Pages: 314

Bertram Cope's Year is a 1919 novel by Henry Blake Fuller, sometimes called the first American homosexual novel.

== Publication and reception ==
Fuller completed work on the novel in May 1918. After failing to interest several New York publishing houses, Fuller placed the novel with his friend Ralph Fletcher Seymour who ran a small publishing house in Chicago, Alderbrink Press, that usually published art books. It appeared in October 1919. The novel is sometimes described as "self-published."

The novel received little attention from literary periodicals when it first appeared and was poorly understood; sales were slight. New Outlook printed a short notice that concluded: "The study of this weak but agreeable man is subtle but far from exciting." The American Library Association's Booklist described it as "A story of superficial social university life in a suburb of Chicago, with live enough people and a sense of humor hovering near the surface."

H. L. Mencken, writing in the Smart Set described Cope as beset with three female suitors and "somewhat heavily patronized" by Randolph. Cope fails to benefit from the efforts of Mrs. Phillips and Randolph and "even forgets to be grateful....It is simply beyond him to imagine that he needs help....A very fair piece of writing as novels go. A bit sly and pizzicato; even a bit distinguished. If you know the later novels of E. F. Benson, you know the tone of it." Mencken noted how different the novel was from some of Fuller's earlier work, novels that "launched realism in America." In the author of Bertram Cope's Year he found "a pleasant style, an adept technique, the manner of a gentleman." It concluded: "It is surely something to be an American novelist, and yet write like a gentleman."

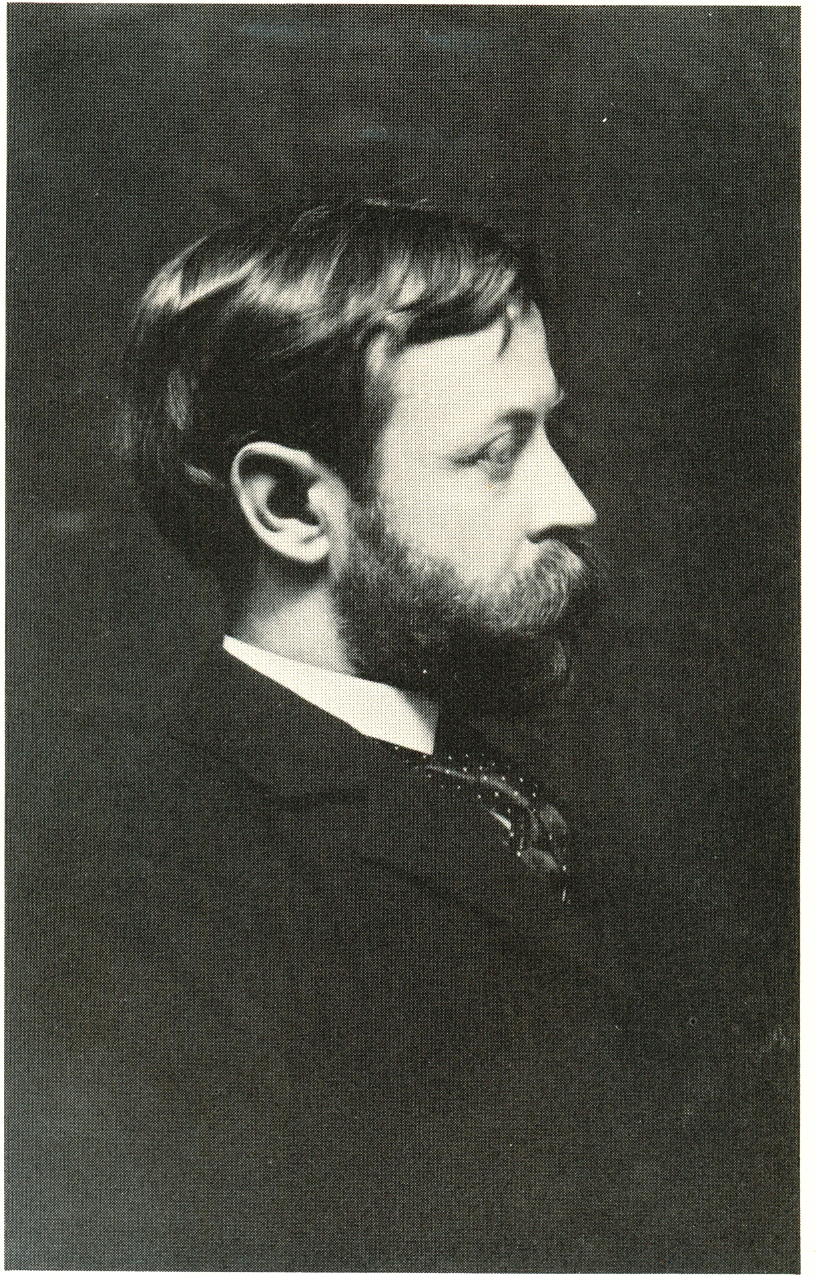
Fuller, c. 1893.

London's The Bookman included the novel in a section of short reviews under the heading "Good Novels of Several Kinds." After summarizing the plot as the tale of a young academic who is the object of the "pathetically burning interest" of an older woman and an older man, the latter "the sort of wistful elderly parasite to be found in any college community," the review recommended it for certain readers: "The kind of novel which must be enjoyed not for its matter so much as for its quality, its richness of texture and subtlety of atmosphere. It has distinction, is as finely wrought in its way as a Howells novel or a Cable. It would be extremely irritating to the customer looking for a rattling good tale."

A few years later, in 1924, John Chipman Farrar, early in his illustrious publishing career, was enthusiastic:

It may be said that Bertram Cope's Year, in so far as it was read and understood at all, shocked Mr. Fuller's friends so painfully that they silenced it into limbo. It is a story, delicately done with the most exquisite taste, of a sublimated irregular affection....[T]hough it was filled with dynamite scrupulously packed, it fell as harmless as a dud, only to be whispered about here and there by grave people who wondered why Mr. Fuller should choose such a theme.

Carl Van Vechten wrote in 1926 that the subject, "generally taboo in English literature," could only be addressed when handled in the style Fuller adopted, "so skilful, so delicate, so studiously restrained, which he termed "ironic comedy":

If Theodore Dreiser had written this book, it would certainly have been suppressed. If Ben Hecht had written it, he would probably be languishing in jail. I cannot, indeed, name another American writer who could have surveyed the ambiguous depths of the problem presented so thoroughly, and at the same time so discreetly....[I]t would probably prove unreadable to one who had no key to its meaning. Once its intention is grasped, however, it becomes one of the most brilliant and glowingly successful of this author's brief series of works.

Roger Austen's 1977 survey of American gay literature faulted Fuller for a lack of candor due to his "pose that all of these gay or semi-gay relationships were something that he himself knew nothing about." By contrast, Andrew Solomon's evaluation accompanying the novel's republication in 1998 praises the novel for depicting "normative homosexuality--discreet, occasional, often unfulfilled, neither delirious nor unbearable," breaking with the traditional depictions of the homosexual as either shameful or theatrical. He cited the novel's "exquisite understatement" and Fuller's "beautifully balanced irony on the subject closest to his heart." In his view, "The novel treads gently around the edge of the erotic" and allows its homosexual characters to "move with moderate ease in a largely straight world." Cope and Arthur enjoy "the minor and comic troubles of essentially rather pleasurable and straightforward male domesticity."

Upon its republication in 1998, it received enthusiastic reviews. Other modern assessments and characterizations vary from "daring" to "rather campy."

A 2004 description of its theme says that when the novel appeared "its gay theme,...although never fully specified, was recognizable. Today...the theme seems positively advertised."

A definitive critical edition of the novel appeared in 2010, and reprints for the first time a recently discovered passage of several handwritten pages that Fuller intended to add to the novel shortly after its initial publication. This indispensable edition supersedes that of Turtle Point Press because it includes helpful annotations and a series of appendices that include Fuller's letters, diary entries, book reviews, and other writings that contain homosexual themes. The introduction by Joseph Dimuro, a UCLA English professor, situates the novel within the corpus of Fuller's other work, discusses its place in an emerging gay culture, and offers revisionary readings of the novel's modern significance.

== Summary ==
The story is set in the present on the campus of a university in fictional Churchton, Illinois, modeled on Northwestern University in Evanston, Illinois, where Bertram Cope, an attractive young English instructor, is spending a year completing his thesis. While he has a certain sophistication, he is socially unaware, easily impressed by the wealthy and their comforts. Lacking confidence, Cope is too careful and self-conscious as he tries to find his place in local society. Cope becomes the elusive object of desire, either social or sexual or some combination of the two, for an older woman, two older men, and three young women. Cope's primary emotional attachment is to his college chum Arthur Lemoyne, who comes to live with him. Their relationship appears to end after Lemoyne, acting the female part in a play, makes a physical advance backstage that offends another male student.

== Themes ==
Fuller never uses the word "homosexual." The narrator is as discreet as the characters. Cope is called "no squire of dames".(10) He comments on social dancing:(61-2)

You know my views on round dances. Why dancing should be done exclusively by couples on the basis of contrasted sexes...! I think of the good old days of the Renaissance in Italy, when women, if they wanted to dance, just got up and danced–alone, or, if they didn't want to dance alone, danced together. I like to see soldiers or sailors dance in pairs, as a straightforward outlet for superfluous energy.

Cope muses on the roles men and women are expected to play:(87)

Of course, there is no more reason for assuming that every man will make a good lover than that every woman will make a good mother or a good housekeeper. Or that every adult male will make a good citizen....I don't feel that I'm an especially creditable one. So it runs. We ground our general life on theories, and then the facts come up and slap us in the face.

There are two unmistakable references to homosexuality. Cope and Arthur, now living together in a single room, celebrate the end of Cope's engagement to Amy. As they return from an evening stroll, Arthur puts his arm around Cope's shoulder: "and Urania, through the whole width of her starry firmament, looked down kindly upon a happier household."(232) Uranian was the term adopted in the Victorian era for comradely love and, ultimately, male homosexuality. When the couple attend an evening at Mrs. Phillips, Joe Foster is disgusted at the way one keeps putting his hand on the other's shoulder and he makes the sexual component explicit by comparing it to the inappropriate behavior of a newlywed couple who forget themselves in public and must be reprimanded for bringing "the manners of the bed-chamber into the drawing-room."(221)

Many passages are open to multiple readings. For example, after Cope swims vigorously and Randolph joins him to bob in the water, the narrator says: "Ceremonially, at least, the rite was complete." Something implied but unspecified did not occur. Cope later recalls his day: "He had had a good swim, if but a brief one, with a companion who had been willing, even if not bold." The action that Randolph was willing but not bold enough to undertake is not specified. Hortense, once she realizes Cope has no interest in her or the other girls, warns him against Arthur, revealing that she sees the relationship Cope maintains with Arthur as an alternative, in some sense equivalent, to a heterosexual engagement. In an age when literary convention respected intense male relationships, she labels this one "that preposterous friendship." Of a fourteen-year-old boy who has provided entertaining companionship, Joe muses: "If I had had a boy, I should have wanted him just like Dick."

Other references are oblique and may simply serve to keep the subject in the reader's awareness. Cope calls tea with three girls "an afternoon in Lesbos."(30) Usage of words like "gay," "queer," "drag," and "closet" may or may not be coded references to homosexuality as well.

Fuller addresses other issues in passing. With reference to political interference with academic freedom, an issue of great concern during World War I, he describes (through Randolph) how college trustees are "hard...on Free Speech" which is sometimes "mauled," though the greatest risks are in "Sociology or Economics."(113) With respect to literary criticism, he complains (through Cope) that "It irks me to find more praise bestowed on the praised-enough,–even on groups of secondary importance, sometimes just because they are remote (in England, perhaps), and so can be treated with an easy objectivity. To dig in your own day and your own community is harder..."(114) A monthly poetry magazine is praised as one "which did not scorn poets because they happened to live in the country in which it was published."(244)

== Synopsis ==
The time is the present. Following some time teaching in Winnebago, Wisconsin, Bertram Cope, 24, arrives at the university to spend a year as an instructor in English literature. Living modestly, he cultivates the society of the well-to-do middle-aged with fine homes. At an afternoon tea, he makes a favorable impression on Mrs. Medora Phillips, the wealthy widow of an art dealer, and Basil Randolph, an "academic manqué," a stockbroker and a collector of books and curiosities. Phillips sees Cope as an interesting addition to her salons. Randolph sees him as a candidate for mentoring. Cope visits Mrs. Phillips at home and she continues a conversational style Cope describes as "pretending to quarrel as a means of entertaining you."(24) Although Cope says little of note and sings several airs without distinction, he is judged favorably. Mrs. Phillips teases him for lacking any interest in the girls she introduces to him. Randolph, who occasionally entertains undergraduates "who readily forgot and quickly dropped you,"(40) researches Cope's background and discusses him with Mrs. Phillips, concluding that Cope has "more than one touch of gentility."(42) Randolph visits Mrs. Phillips' wheelchair-using tenant, Joe Foster, her late husband's half-brother, and learns that she imagines Cope may prove a match for one of the three girls who live in her house, Amy, Hortense, and Carolyn. From his quarters upstairs, Joe heard Cope's singing and was impressed enough to want to learn more of Cope. When Mrs. Phillips invites Randolph to a young people's dinner that will include Cope, he feels "a slight stir of elation."(54)

Cope describes Mrs. Phillips' dinner, the fine house and its appointments. He thought Randolph was especially attentive to him at dinner and that Joe found him boisterous: "He must have fancied me (from the racket I was making) as a sort of free-and-easy Hercules..., if not as the whole football squad rolled into one." Cope tried not to shake Joe's hand too vigorously, but Joe "took all I gave and even seemed to hang on for a little more."(63) He notices Joe indicate by glances to Mrs. Phillips that he is disappointed Cope does not sing on this occasion. Randolph walks Cope home and then ends the evening, in Cope's words, "taking my hand to say good night and taking his own time in dropping it."(66) In a letter, Cope urges his friend Arthur Lemoyne to leave Winnebago and come to live with him: "...we can go into quarters together: a real bed instead of an upholstered shelf and a closet big enough for two wardrobes."(67) Randolph visits Cope in his modest rooms and Cope finds him not at all judgmental. Cope returns the visit and they discuss the authors of Shakespeare's plays. Randolph takes Cope to dinner and the theater. When Cope declines alcohol, Randolph feels "like a corrupter of youth,"(74) but he is pleased that Cope treats him as a peer and never calls him "sir."

Cope and Randolph travel to a house party at Mrs. Phillips' vacation home in fashionable Duneland. They pause along the lake shore to swim and discuss the other guests they are joining, "enough fellows to look after the stove and the pump"(87) and the three girls. Cope believes he lacks the "knack" for handling the girls and does not want to acquire it. He supposes he will end up married in any case, but prefers Randolph's good fortune in remaining single. Mrs. Phillips leads a tour of her property and finds the appreciative Cope "a highly civilized faun for her highly sylvan setting."(93) Cope manages a conversation with Amy and then sings with success. He warns the others that the sea is too cold for swimming and the narrator tells us that "He objected to promiscuous bathing even more strongly than he objected to promiscuous dancing."(102) Cope appraises the day without any thought of the girls or Mrs. Phillips.

By letter Arthur asks Cope to find him employment. Reading Arthur's mention of an outing with another fellow, Cope "dwelt darkly on this passage."(110) Randolph and Cope discuss literature again and Randolph is moved: "He liked the boy better than ever, and felt more than ever prompted to attach him to himself."(114) Each imagines moving to new accommodations, Randolph to quarters with a spare room where "a young knight" might sleep as a guest, Cope to a larger room where Arthur will make their coffee and toast.(116-7)

Mrs. Phillips holds a dinner for adults, inviting Cope to pair with the daughter of a banking family. Cope disappoints her, reacting to the presence of prominent elders with "a caution that almost became expressiveness."(119) Cope takes ill, nearly faints, and fears he has appeared a weakling. At Mrs. Phillips' insistence he spends the night: "he felt greatly subordinated; he wished that he might have capitulated to a man."(126) When Cope and Amy walk to campus in the morning, she thinks it "a privilege...curtailed much too soon,"(129) while he would rather have walked alone. Foster's reaction to Cope's fainting is "as if a shaping ideal had dissipated. Or as if a trace of weakness in one seemingly so young and strong was not altogether unacceptable as a source of consolation."(129)

Cope feigns an excuse to cancel plans for a weekend trip with Randolph. Cope shares photographs with Mrs. Phillips and Amy and they notice Arthur in several. Cope explains Arthur will join him in January: "We shall look after each other....We are going to live together."(151) Cope explains in a letter to Arthur that he gave up the trip with Randolph for Arthur's sake: "I acknowledge your first claim."(152) Cope and Amy meet by chance, take a sailboat on the lake, have an accident, and swim to shore. He realizes that he has done no more to rescue her than she him, but Amy reports to Mrs. Phillips that he was "brave and strong" and saved her life. Cope is "almost afraid that she had saved his."(163)

Cope is impressed with Randolph's new rooms and their appointments, yet troubled to think he needs to accomplish the same eventually. When he explains his plan to share a room with Arthur, Randolph feels a "slight touch of pique."(172) He wins from Cope another assertion that he will never marry. At another of Mrs. Phillips' gatherings, Cope resents how Amy and Mrs. Phillips depict him as the hero of the sail-boating accident. Amy believes her relationship with Cope is growing more romantic. Mrs. Phillips feels Amy is interfering with Cope's role as her own acquisition. At the evening's end, Cope feels Amy's farewell was "too much like the hand of possession."(186) He believes that Mrs. Phillips recognizes that Amy's attentions to him are misdirected.

The narrator warns that Amy's sweet face masks "stubbornness and tenacity."(188) When she wants to discuss "happiness," Cope imagines what she means and is "conscious of a fundamental repugnance to any such scheme of life and was acutely aware that–for a while at least, and perhaps for always–he wanted to live in quite a different mode."(189) Joe tells Randolph that Cope is always at Mrs. Phillips' and Amy has given the house "the deadly aroma of a courtship going stale."(191) It is clear to Joe that Randolph's move to new quarters was motivated by the possibility of entertaining Cope. As they discuss the possibility of Cope marrying, Randolph remarks:(193)

I wouldn't go so far as to assert that a young man married is a man that's marred...But somehow he does seem done for. He is placed; he is cut off from wide ranges of interesting possibilities; he offers himself less invitingly to the roving imagination...

Cope regrets that he has allowed Amy to believe that he is prepared to marry her, having only tried to respond with tact when she pressed him. He has "a crushing sense of his predicament"(196) and asks her to tell no one. In a letter, Arthur tells Cope he must end the engagement promptly: "This thing can't go on, and you know it as well as I do. Nip it. Nip it now. Don't think that our intimacy is to end in any such fashion as this, for it isn't..."(197)

Cope passes the Christmas holidays with his family in Freeford, joined by Arthur, who informs the Copes that Amy has taken advantage of Cope's chivalrous nature. Cope returns to find his relationship with Amy has become common knowledge. When Cope and Arthur visit Mrs. Phillips for a soirée, Arthur is on display and stays close to Cope, often with his hand on Cope's shoulder. Joe hates how Arthur behaves around Cope, bringing "the manners of the bed-chamber into the drawing-room."(221) Randolph speaks to Cope and learns his true feelings about Amy. Randolph organizes a dinner party to arrange a rescue, where he and Mrs. Phillips, and Hortense, and Pearson agree the couple are not a match.

Cope frustrates Amy's attempts to see him. She soon ends their engagement and is promptly engaged to Pearson. Arthur congratulates Cope on his escape from marriage. As they return from a stroll, Arthur puts his arm around Cope's shoulder: "and Urania, through the whole width of her starry firmament, looked down kindly upon a happier household."(232) Arthur and Cope live together amicably, though there are occasional "sharp tones and quivering nostrils."(243) Cope next finds himself the subject of both Carolyn's and Hortense's artistic efforts. Hortense asks Cole to sit so she can complete a portrait of him she has started and he visits her studio once. He learns that Carolyn has published two sonnets in tribute to him and is at a loss how to respond: "Cope put his hand wearily to his forehead. The arts were a curse. So were gifted girls. So were over-appreciative women. He wished he were back home...with Arthur Lemoyne."(246) Arthur and Cope squabble over Cope returning to Hortense's studio. They make up with Cope's arm around Arthur's shoulder, Arthur pressing Cope's hand with his own.

After several postponements Cope and Arthur visit Randolph for dinner. Randolph and Arthur recognize they are rivals and size each other up critically. As Randolph hears more of their life in Winnebago, he "began to realize...the difficulties in the way of 'cultivating' Cope. Cope was a field already occupied, a niche already filled."(251) Joe asks what the girls, Mrs. Phillips, and even Randolph see in Cope, replies:(256)

Don't ask me why they care....Why does anybody care? And for what? For the thing that is just out of reach. He's cool; he's selfish; he's indifferent. Yet, somehow, frost and fire join end to end and make the circle complete.. ..It's all like children straining upward for an icicle, and presently slipping, with cracked pates, on the ice below.

Randolph suggests Joe has found Cope appealing in some way as well, Joe objects harshly. Randolph prefers not to answer than to argue in his defense. Randolph, as a favor to Cope, helps Arthur find a job in a university office.

Cope sits for Hortense, and they discuss Amy's approaching wedding and Carolyn's sonnets. Hortense is surprised to learn that Cope has no feelings for Carolyn and confesses her own feelings for him. Unwilling to repeat the mistake he made with Amy, Cope states his position with "the cruel detachment of bullets": "I like you as well as another; no more, no less. I am in no position to think of love and marriage, and I have no inclination that way. I am willing to be friends with everybody, and nothing more with anybody."(264) Hortense responds by destroying her unfinished portrait so "there will be nothing to record my folly" in loving him. She warns him against Arthur: "Your Arthur Lemoyne. That preposterous friendship cannot go on for long. You will tire of him; or more likely he will tire of you. Something different, something better will be needed,–and you will live to learn so."(265)

Joe Foster enjoys spending time with Amy's fourteen-year-old brother, who visits for Amy's wedding to Pearson, calling him "a tonic breeze." "If I had had a boy, I should have wanted him just like Dick," Joe tells himself.(268) Mrs. Phillips is eager to see Amy off so she can invite Cope once more. She and Randolph discuss their somewhat competitive attempts to gain Cope's attention. She calls Arthur "an uncertain quantity."(271) Cope joins another Duneland weekend while Arthur, now cast in an important female role in the Dramatic Society's next presentation, rehearses. Mrs. Phillips explains that good taste requires a man who plays a female role to avoid too perfect an impersonation. Cope alerts the house to a late-night burglar and is praised as a hero though he only raised the alarm, while a servant chased the burglar off. Cope knows the role he played, but Mrs. Phillips and Carolyn convince themselves he played the hero's part.

Arthur fusses with his costume and Cope objects to having ladies' garments about their room, though "not speaking his essential thought."(290) In performance, Arthur's successful acting en travesti fails to please: "he was feminine, even overfeminine, throughout."(291) When Randolph recounts his reactions to Joe, who refers to Randolph's "caring" for Cope, Randolph counters that it was just "a passing amitié,"(292) using a French word because he is unsure what he means to say. It transpires that immediately following the performance Arthur, remaining in character, made unspecified advances to a fellow actor in a male role, for which he received a bruise on his forehead, lost his role, and was expelled from the university. The narrator comments: "He had carried things too far. Well, such are the risks run by the sincere, self-revealing artist."(294) Cope finds the social atmosphere has turned chilly, Randolph declines Cope's request for help in finding Arthur new employment, and Arthur returns to Winnebago before the term ends.

Randolph regrets Cope did not realize what Randolph could have done for him: "I could have opened up avenues that would have made his year here a very different thing."(299) He and Mrs. Phillips plan to attend graduation as "reconciled competitors"(301) to see Cope in his farewell performance. After the ceremony, Carolyn, still in pursuit, congratulates Cope. Cope leaves for Freeford without saying his goodbyes. A few weeks later, he sends Carolyn a perfunctory note reporting that he visited Arthur in Winnebago for a few days and has now taken a new position with "an important university in the East."(307) The narrator interprets the note as evidence that Cope has his eye on the future and will travel East alone. Of Cope's attachment to Arthur, Randolph remarks to Joe: "[L]iking is the great mystery–whether you take its coming or its going."(309) He plans not to repeat his attempt to cultivate a young man in the coming academic year. Mrs. Phillips imagines Cope and Carolyn may still make a match. Randolph finds it equally plausible that Arthur will join Cope in the East. Ruefully Mrs. Phillips tells him: "The young, at best, only tolerate us. We are but the platform they dance on,–the ladder they climb by."(314)

== Characters ==
- Bertram Cope, 24, college instructor, from Freeford, a fictitious town in southern Illinois
- Mrs. Medora Phillips, about 45, wealthy widow of an art dealer, collector, and artist
- Boarders with Mrs. Phillips
  - Joseph Foster, 47, her late husband's half-brother; he uses a wheelchair and is barely able to see
  - Amy Leffingwell, 20 or more, a violinist
  - Hortense Dunton, 23, an artist, niece to Mrs. Phillips
  - Carolyn Thorpe, a poet and pianist, secretary to Mrs. Phillips
- Basil Randolph, nearly 50, stockbroker and a collector of books and curiosities
- Arthur Lemoyne, Bertram's friend, about 27, from Winnebago
- George F. Pearson, a young businessman, neighbor and occasional guest of Mrs. Phillips

== See also ==
- Lost Gay Novels
