= Alderbrook Resort & Spa =

Hotel in Union, Washington, United States

- Location within Washington (state) Location within the United States

General information
- Location: United States, 10 E Alderbrook Drive; Union, Washington
- Coordinates: 47.347482°N 123.067462°W
- Opening: 1913
- Owner: North Forty Lodging

Website
- alderbrookresort.com

Alderbrook Resort & Spa, aka Alderbrook Inn or Alderbrook, is a hotel located in Union, WA on the southern shores of Hood Canal. Approximately two hours west of Seattle, Alderbrook has views of nearby Olympic National Park and Mount Washington. Alderbrook opened in 1920 as a group of tent cabins with wood stoves and has been expanded and remodeled numerous times. Today the hotel has 77 guest rooms and little more like 16 cottages, as well as a restaurant, meeting rooms, saltwater pool, spa, two marinas, and two retail spaces.

== History ==
Alderbrook was originally built by Henry Stumer, a Seattle business owner who had previously owned the Hotel Stumer in Union City (now Union, WA). Beginning in 1909, Stumer worked with friends from Seattle's Swedish Club to buy and develop beachfront property just east of Union City. Stumer bought three of the resulting lots from what became known as the Sunny Beach tract and built tent cabins consisting of frames covered in black and orange striped canvas. The cabins had no windows and no electricity, only a wooden stove for heating and cooking. The creek running through the property was used for refrigeration. There was no road when Alderbrook opened in 1913 so guests arrived by boat from Union City or on horseback.

Stumer expanded Alderbrook over the next fourteen years to include a lodge and amphitheater, ten acres, and 600' of waterfront. In 1927, Stumer sold the Alderbrook Inn to Clara Eastwood and Jessie Mustard, two women from Seattle. Jessie Mustard soon married and sold her shares to Eloise Flagg. Eastwood and Flagg operated and maintained the Inn themselves and, having worked hard to put Alderbrook on the map, became known as the "Alderbrook Girls".

In 1931 Eastwood and Flagg formed Alderbrook Inn, Inc. Under the corporation, they began purchasing adjacent land and by 1944 had grown Alderbrook to 360 acres. Alderbrook Center opened in 1941 featuring a soda fountain and sandwich shop, and in 1944 they opened the Flagwood gift shop, the Alderbrook Apparel Shop, and Alderbrook Beauty Shop. In 1945, they retired and sold the corporation to the Schafer family, owners of Schafer Logging and Lumber Company. Clara Eastwood retained the westernmost Sunny Beach lot where the Flagwood gift shop was located and built a cabin for herself.

Schafer remodeled the Inn and added 21 vacation cottages next to the property and then sold the Inn to the Dickman Lumber Company. The Dickman's remodeled the Inn again in 1955 to add a cocktail lounge, rec hall, and service building.

In 1959 Wes Johnson, a Hood Canal realtor from Hoodsport purchased the Alderbrook Inn. Johnson quickly released redevelopment plans which included the addition of an indoor swimming pool, marina, 18-hole golf course, and 70-room hotel. To finance the redevelopment, Johnson began selling the vacation cottages individually.

In 1964, construction began on the first nine holes of the golf course on the property up the hill from the Inn. Johnson announced additional plans for residential development around the golf course and an airfield, as well as an office building across the highway from the Inn to house the administrative offices for this upland development and his new Hood Canal Real Estate Company.

By 1966 the floating dock, indoor swimming pool, and 9-hole golf course were completed, as well as the addition of 26 lanai guest rooms and 5 meeting rooms.

== High-rise hotel controversy ==
In 1966 Wes Johnson announced new plans for redeveloping the Alderbrook Inn which centered around demolishing the existing lodge and building a new high-rise hotel on pilings out over the water. The new hotel would feature a below-water lounge with a glass wall.

A permit from the Army Corps of Engineers was required because the project was proposed over navigable waters. In 1968, following the permit application and a solicitation for public comment, Mason County commissioners responded with no objections; however, numerous comments from individuals expressing opposition to the project were submitted. Among the complaints were concerns over increased pollution from the hotel itself and increased boat traffic, an undesirable increase in tourism, and primarily the encroachment of buildings and fill-up of Hood Canal tidelands. If approved, the new 11-story hotel would set a precedent for allowing high-rise structures along the shoreline. In a hearing before the Mason County commissioners in January 1969 a group of individuals calling themselves the Hood Canal Committee for Planning requested that the Mason County Board of Commissioners withdraw their approval of the project and request more time to decide.

The Hood Canal Committee made similar requests to several state agencies and Governor Dan Evans asking that they reject the permit application. They also circulated a petition asking Mason County to enact an emergency zoning ordinance to protect the shoreline until a comprehensive plan already in process outlining environmental protections could be approved. Nine state agencies speaking through the Department of Water Resources did withdraw their approval.

In February 1969, the Army Corps of Engineers informed the Department of the Interior that they would approve the permit unless the Department stated opposition. The response from the Department was in opposition to the permit but could not cite any law to support it. A letter from Governor Dan Evans in October also did not approve of the project but stated that it was not in violation of any state statute.

The rejection of the project from the Department of Interior required that the ultimate decision come from top Army Engineer officials in Washington, D.C. In an unusual course of action, a public hearing was scheduled for January 24, 1970, by the Army Corps of Engineers to "make sure they [had] all the pertinent facts and to conduct business in a climate of public understanding."

Meanwhile, the State Supreme Court issued a ruling in a case concerning land along the shores of Lake Chelan. The ruling stated that "the public has a right to go where the navigable waters go even though the navigable waters lie over privately owned lands," and that landfills along the shores of Lake Chelan that lie between the summer high water mark and winter low water mark must be torn out. In January 1970, Governor Dan Evans applied this State Supreme Court ruling to the Alderbrook development project stating that "the Alderbrook project is contrary to the laws of the State of Washington and the state must and does oppose it."

On April 21, 1970, the Washington, D.C. headquarters of the Army Corps of Engineers ruled against the issuance of a permit for the Alderbrook project because of "adverse effects on the environment and esthetics." They cited the National Environmental Policy Act of 1969 and Presidential Executive Order 11514 (Protection and Enhancement of Environmental Quality, dated March 5, 1970) as making it the responsibility of all Federal agencies to protect and preserve the environment. This was a landmark decision because previously all Army Corps permit decisions were based on water navigation interference alone.

In 1971, the Washington State Shoreline Management Act went into effect requiring all developments within 200 feet of the shore to have a special permit. Wes Johnson was required to obtain one of these special permits and revised his plans for Alderbrook to make the new hotel shorter and move it back above the shoreline. It was not until 1977 that Johnson began construction on the new hotel, and it opened in August 1978. The addition included 47 guest rooms, two dining rooms, and an indoor pool and hot tub spa. A 40,000-gallon capacity sewage treatment plant was also built.

Wes Johnson listed the Alderbrook Inn and its related properties for sale in 1985, however, he remained the owner until he died in 1991. Alderbrook was finally sold in 1998 to Crista Ministries to be turned into a Christian conference center. The Inn remained open to the public; however, the lounge was closed, and smoking and alcohol were prohibited. Some thought that it was a Christian facility only and Crista Ministries was unable to sustain it. After three years, Alderbrook was again listed for sale.

== Acquisition by North Forty Lodging ==
The Alderbrook Inn was purchased by North Forty Lodging in 2001. The 18-hole golf course was sold to the Alderbrook Golf and Yacht Club, the 450-member homeowners association for residences surrounding the course. In 2002, North Forty Lodging announced plans to transform the resort into a 4-star hotel, spa, and conference center. Renovation plans included demolition and construction of new buildings, remodeling the main lodge and 21 cottages, expanding the restaurant and bar, adding a spa, fitness center, and conference center, and moving the highway.

=== Moving the highway ===
For decades Washington State Route 106 separated Alderbrook from its public parking area, forcing guests to cross the busy highway with their luggage and catching motorists by surprise. As a part of the 2002 renovation, a half-mile section of the highway was rerouted behind the parking lot and administrative buildings. The engineering and permitting necessary for the move delayed the reopening of the Inn by nearly a year, but rerouting the highway was essential to creating a sense of arrival in the destination resort. The highway construction included improvements to the salmon habitat on Alderbrook Creek which runs alongside the lodge.

Alderbrook closed for renovation in September 2002. The newly branded Alderbrook Resort and Spa opened in June 2004 with opening celebrations over the 4th of July weekend. The new resort consisted of 77 guest rooms, 16 guest cottages, 6,600 sf of meeting space, a spa, an indoor pool and Jacuzzi, a fitness center, a restaurant, a lounge, and a marina.

In 2008 the Lady Alderbrook, a 53-foot cruise boat, was purchased and moored at the Alderbrook dock to provide guests with canal cruises and an alternate venue for special parties.

In 2009 a new, more environmentally friendly dock was installed at Alderbrook. The new dock replaced creosote-treated wood with composite decking and Styrofoam floats with polyethylene. It also featured "stops" to keep it elevated above the beach at low tide to protect sea life.

== Community improvements ==
=== Local economy ===
Alderbrook's 2002 renovation brought revitalization to the town of Union and the surrounding area. When Crista Ministries listed the Inn for sale in 2001 Alderbrook was the largest employer in the area with 70 employees. Local businesses were dependent on the resort to attract tourists, but its primary function as a Christian conference center attracted mostly youth groups and Christian retreats. When the resort closed for renovation the unemployment rate in Mason County reached 7% and area gift shops went out of business. When it reopened in 2004 the resort employed between 110 and 130 people, and restaurants and gift shops began to reopen and stay open year-round instead of closing for the winter.

=== Hood Canal Marina ===
In 2007, it was announced that North Forty Lodging had purchased the Hood Canal Marina 1 mile east of the resort and planned a total replacement of the moorage area, remodel of the building, addition of a new septic system, beachfront picnic spot, landscaped parking area, and most importantly the sale of gas and diesel for boats.

When the marina was developed in the 1960s there were several gas docks available and fishing and ski boats filled the waters of lower Hood Canal. Hood Canal Marina was the last gas facility in the area when the tanks were removed in 1998 due to new environmental regulations. For the next ten years, the nearest fueling station for boats was an hour away at Pleasant Harbor Marina, and fears of getting stranded prevented boaters from venturing to the lower end of the canal.

The new dock was installed in 2008. Galvanized steel pilings, sealed polyurethane floats, and composite decking replaced creosote logs and Styrofoam making the new dock more environmentally friendly.

=== Union City Market ===
An Alderbrook employee and Union native approached the resort with a vision for the space at the Hood Canal Marina: local farmers market/marina general store of the past; an avenue for local artists, crafts, and food to be in one place. In July 2015, the Union City Market opened as just that, with a space for community gatherings as well. Many local artists, craftspeople, and businesses sell their wares through the Market, and the Market has been a venue for shows celebrating oysters, beer, art, and more.

== Awards ==
- Best Northwest Destination Wedding Site - Seattle Bride Magazine, voted by Readers and Vendors in 2009
- One of the Best Spa Retreats 2009, 2010 & 2011 - Evening Magazine's The Best of Western Washington & Northwest Escapes
- One of the Best Resorts 2009, 2010, 2011, 2013 & 2015 - Evening Magazine's The Best of Western Washington & Northwest Escapes
- One of the Top Northwest Destination Wedding Sites - Seattle Bride's "Best Of" 2010, 2011, 2012, 2014, 2016, 2018
- Top Mainland Resorts on Condé Nast Traveler 2011 - Condé Nast Traveler's 2011 Readers' Choice Awards
- Top 3 Wedding Venue 2011 - Evening Magazine's The Best of Western Washington & Northwest Escapes
- Northwest Destination Wedding Site - Seattle Met Bride & Groom 2012
- Best Northwest Resort - Seattle Magazine's "Best Of" Reader's Choice 2013
- One of the Best Hotels and Resorts in Washington - Condé Nast Traveler's Gold List 2014
- Pacific Northwest A-List Best Resort - City Voter Pacific Northwest A-List, 2016
- Best Weekend Getaways from Seattle - Vacation Idea, 2017
- 25 Best Romantic Spa Weekend Getaways in the U.S. - Vacation Idea, 2017
- One of the Top 10 Resorts in the Pacific Northwest - Condé Nast Traveler's Reader's Choice "Top 10" Awards 2018
- One of the 10 Best for Winter in the Pacific Northwest 2018 - USA Today
- 2018 Uproxx Travel Hot List
- Best Northwest Resort & Place to Honeymoon - South Sound Magazine's "Best Of" 2019
- One of the Best Resorts in Washington 2019 - U.S. News & World Report

== Other resources ==
- Anderson, Helen McReavy (1960). How When and Where on Hood Canal. Everett, WA: Puget Press. p. 56. OCLC 10963694.
- Fredson, Mike (2007). Hood Canal. San Francisco, CA: Arcadia Publishing. p. 9. ISBN 9780738548012.
- Elmendorf, William W. (1994). Twana Narratives: Native Historical Accounts of a Coast Salish Culture. Seattle, WA: University of Washington Press. ISBN 9780774804752.
- Pacific Coast Architecture Database
- Dawson Design Associates - most recent renovation
