= Alderbrink Press =

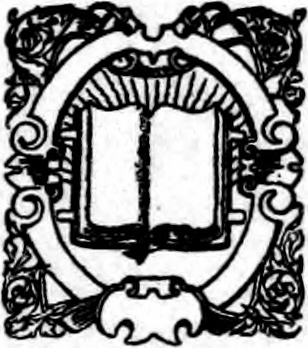
The logo of Alderbrink Press as of 1919.

Alderbrink Press was a book publishing firm in Chicago run by Ralph Fletcher Seymour from 1897 until 1965.

The Alderbrink Press maintained the traditions of the Arts and Crafts Movement. One early appreciation of its work said that it published "a variety of books in various styles, but all show great care in fitting together traits and materials which harmonize, and not a few deserve unreserved praise."

Among the works that appeared under its imprint were Frank Lloyd Wright's The Japanese Print (1912) and Experimenting with Human Lives (1923), and Alice Corbin's Red Earth: Poems of New Mexico (1920). It published Henry Blake Fuller's Bertram Cope's Year (1919).

== See also ==
- Fine press
