= The Lemberg Mosaic =

Book on the Holocaust by Jakob Weiss

- Cover Art
- Author: Jakob Weiss
- Original title: Memoirs of Two who Survived the Destruction of Jewish Galicia
- Language: English
- Subject: The Holocaust
- Genre: Non-fiction
- Publisher: Alderbrook Press
- Publication date: First Edition 2010
- Publication place: United States
- Pages: 417
- ISBN: 9780983109105
- OCLC: 711128993

The Lemberg Mosaic, subtitled the "Memoirs of Two who Survived the Destruction of Jewish Galicia", is a book on The Holocaust by Jakob Weiss. This work brings to light the relatively obscure history of the systematic and total destruction of Jewish Lemberg (Lwów, now Lviv in Ukraine). It is presented in the format of a biography, detailing the struggle for survival of four families in the backdrop of two back-to-back invasions of the city and surrounding region by both the Soviets (1939) and the Germans (1941).

== Overview ==
Before the Second World War Lviv was known as Lwów. After the Treaty of Versailles and the rebirth of modern Poland (the Second Polish Republic), Lwów (formerly, Lemberg) became the third largest city in Poland with the third largest Jewish population (after Warsaw and Łódź). Some sources call the destruction of this once vibrant Jewish community the "Holocaust by Bullets," or the "Shoah of Jewish Galicia" or the "Ukrainian Holocaust." Recent forensic evidence as uncovered and analyzed by researchers like the French priest, Father Patrick Desbois, has corobborated the testimony of both survivors and eyewitnesses that well over one million and perhaps as many as 1.5 million Jews were brutally murdered in World War II during the Nazi invasion of the easternmost region of Poland, also known as Galicia, today's West Ukraine.

== Afterword by Dr. Berthold Zarwyn ==
Back cover art: Collage

The book's Afterword was penned by Dr. Berthold Zarwyn himself a native of the city and survivor of the Lwów Ghetto. In it, he details his own eyewitness account of what transpired during the Nazi invasion, including participation of the Ukrainian militia, the Ukrainian Auxiliary Police and the local populace in the atrocities - primarily targeting the Jews in the city and the surrounding region of eastern Galicia (District of Galicia). In his comments, a cross reference is made by Dr. Zarwyn to a specific Ukrainian auxiliary police officer, John Kalymon who was stripped of his United States citizenship for falsifying his role as a guard in the Lemberg Ghetto. Dr. Zarwyn has made a significant contribution to the continuing efforts to bring former Nazi collaborators to justice such as Kalymon who is currently the subject of a criminal prosecution by a Munich tribunal as Operation Last Chance continues. The Munich prosecution of Kalymon is now before same court (led by the same prosecutor) that tried and convicted the infamous John Demjanjuk as an accessory to the murder of 27,900 Jews.
