= Swedish Cultural Center =

Cultural center in Seattle, Washington, U.S.

Coordinates: 47°38′11″N 122°20′32″W

- Interactive map of the Swedish Cultural Center area

General information
- Location: Seattle, Washington, United States

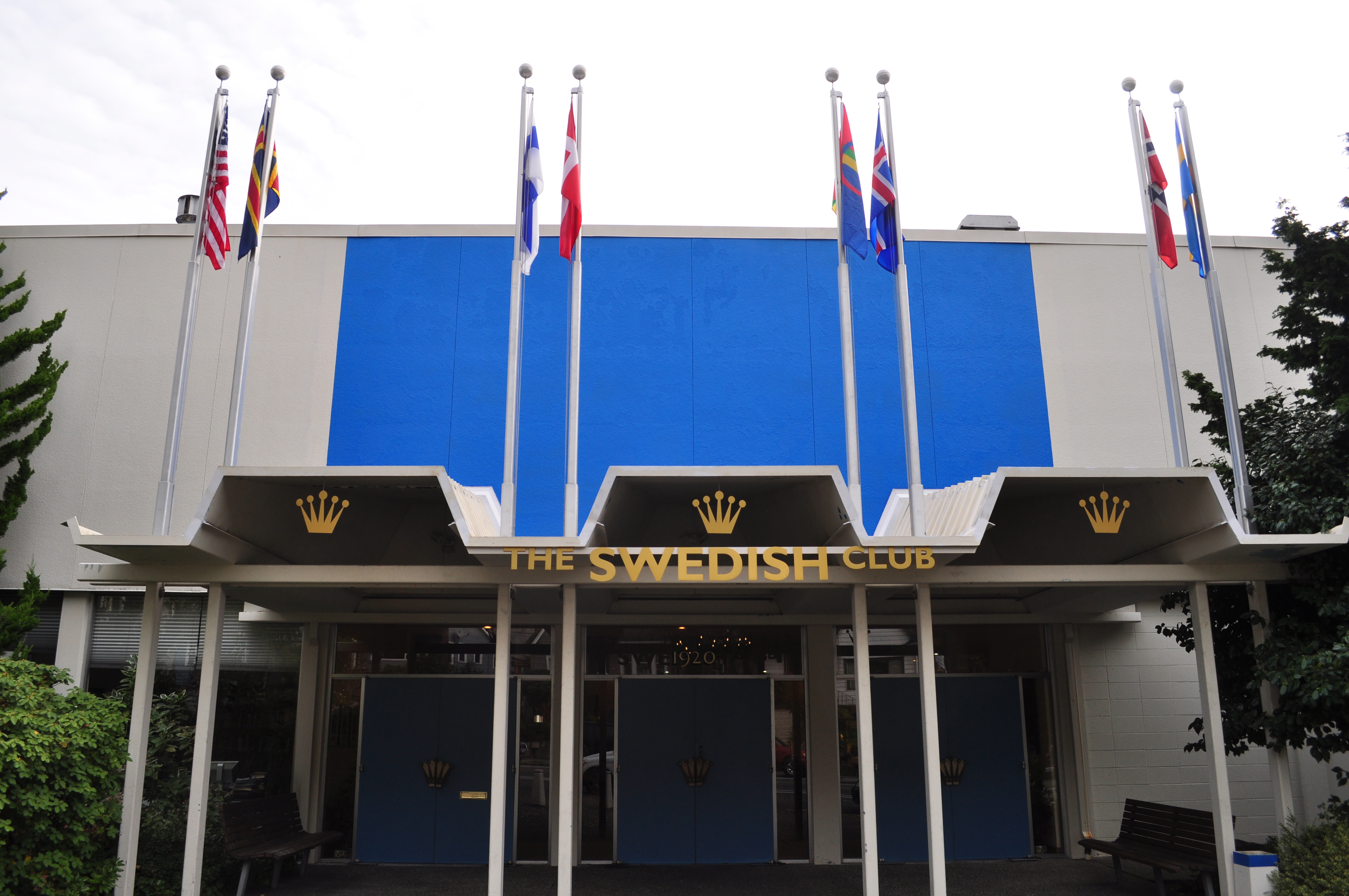

The Swedish Cultural Center is a meeting spot for Scandinavians in Seattle, Washington. It was founded in 1892, initially as the Swedish Club and is sometimes still known under that name.

The club is located at 1920 Dexter Avenue North in a building designed by architects Einar V. Anderson, Arden Croco Steinhart, and Robert Dennis Theriault Sr., and built 1959–1961. Prior to that they were located in a 1902 building on Eighth Avenue by contractors Otto Roseleaf, August S. Peterson, and Otto Rudolf Roseleaf.

The club hosts a number of events for members and non-members with different pricing for each. Among their public events are a monthly pancake breakfast, which draws between five hundred and one thousand people, and a Friday Kafé; their Friday evening "happy hour" (which actually runs for 5 1/2 hours) is open to "prospective members". They also offer Swedish lessons and show Scandinavian films.
