= Alderbrook Winery =

Winery in California, United States

- Location: Healdsburg, California, USA
- Appellation: Dry Creek Valley AVA
- Founded: 1982
- Key people: Bryan Parker; winemaker
- Parent company: Terlato Wine Group
- Cases/yr: 30,000
- Known for: Zinfandel
- Varietals: Pinot noir, Carignane, Syrah
- Other products: Port
- Distribution: International
- Tasting: Open to the public
- Website: http://www.alderbrook.com

Alderbrook Winery was a winery in Healdsburg, California, United States. The winery was owned by the Terlato Wine Group and produced upwards of 30,000 cases a year. Their signature wines were Zinfandels using grapes from the Dry Creek Valley AVA.

Founded in 1982, Alderbrook originally focused on white wines. In 1992 the original partners sold the 63-acre ranch to G.W. Gillemont, from Schramsberg Vineyards. In 2001, Terlato Wine Group purchased the majority interest in Alderbrook. As of 2017, the winery was no longer operating.

== Wines ==
Bryan Parker was the winemaker for Alderbrook. Alderbrook's signature wine was but they also used carignane, which is often used as a blending, for wine.

=== Zinfandel ===
Zinfandel was the primary varietal used at Alderbrook. They made six different types of Zinfandel, a Zinfandel/Syrah blend, and a port using the grape. All of their zinfandel grapes came from the Dry Creek Valley appellation, including estate and old vine grapes. The winery used 25-30% French oak for the aging process. The low percentage helps to minimize the oak flavors in the finished Zinfandel wine.
