= Union Fishermen's Cooperative Packing Company Alderbrook Station =

- U.S. National Register of Historic Places
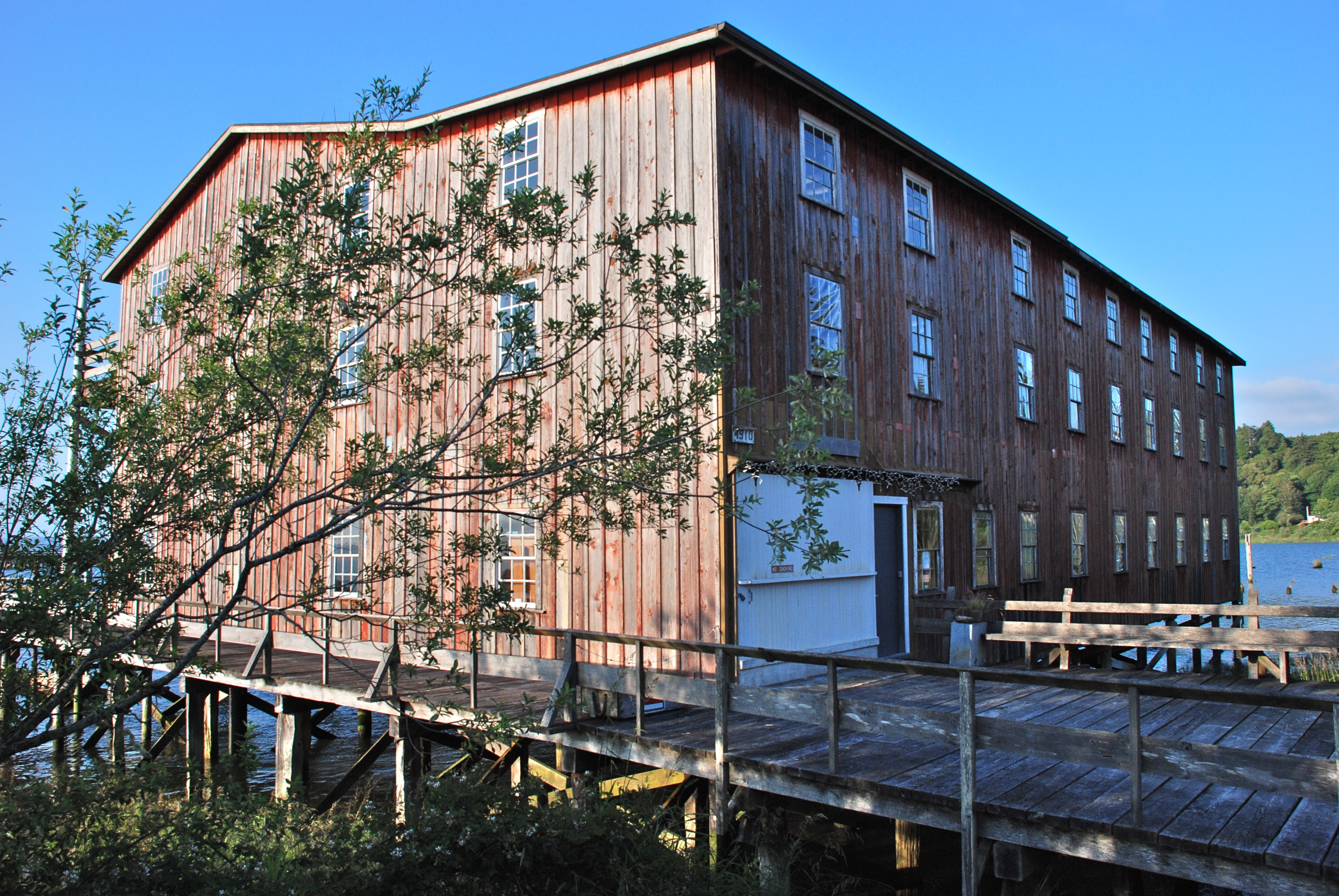
- The boat and net storage shed, Alderbrook Station's largest building, in 2012

- Location within Oregon Location within the United States
- Location: 4900 Ash Street; Astoria, Oregon
- Coordinates: 46°11′49″N 123°46′57″W
- Area: 4.5 acres (1.8 ha)
- Built: c. 1903
- Built by: Kankkonen, Frank
- Architectural style: Vernacular utilitarian
- NRHP reference No.: 91000053
- Added to NRHP: February 20, 1991

Union Fishermen's Cooperative Packing Company Alderbrook Station, on the Columbia River in Astoria, Oregon, was built in 1903. It was listed on the National Register of Historic Places (NRHP) in 1991. The listing included three contributing buildings and another contributing structure on a 4.5-acre (1.8 ha) area.

The Union Fishermen's Cooperative Packing Company dates from 1896. Founded in 1896 "by a group of gillnetters aiming to gain more control over market and working conditions", the company built a cannery and two stations, this one in Alderbrook and another in Uppertown. These stations served members, mostly Finns and Scandinavians, who lived in Alderbrook and Uppertown neighborhoods. "At these stations, the gillnetters could unload their catches at receiving stations at the pierhead, find secure moorage close to their homes, and have ready access to storage and repair facilities."

Only the 1903 Alderbrook station survives intact. The three-story, 60-by-100-foot (18 m × 30 m) fishing boat and net storage shed, standing on pilings in the river, is the largest of the station's surviving buildings. It has a two-story boat lift at its northwest corner, but the lift was in "poor condition" at the time of the property's nomination to the NRHP. Other structures still in place are a machine shop, a small cabin and the largest of the several wooden piers that connected the parts of the facility. Although only a few pilings remain of the complex's fish receiving station, the property remains as "a generally complete and [the] only remaining facility of the cooperative enterprise which figured importantly in Astoria's legendary packing industry, for many years the basis of local economy. The Co-op was a vital force through the peak period of salmon fishing on the lower Columbia, which had ended by 1930, but it continued active long enough to observe a 50th anniversary in 1946 and beyond."

Among the coop's other buildings was a "storage warehouse and receiving station" built on pilings in the river at 31st Street (in Uppertown), which survives but was heavily damaged in a 2007 storm.
