= Henry Blake Fuller =

American writer (1857–1929)

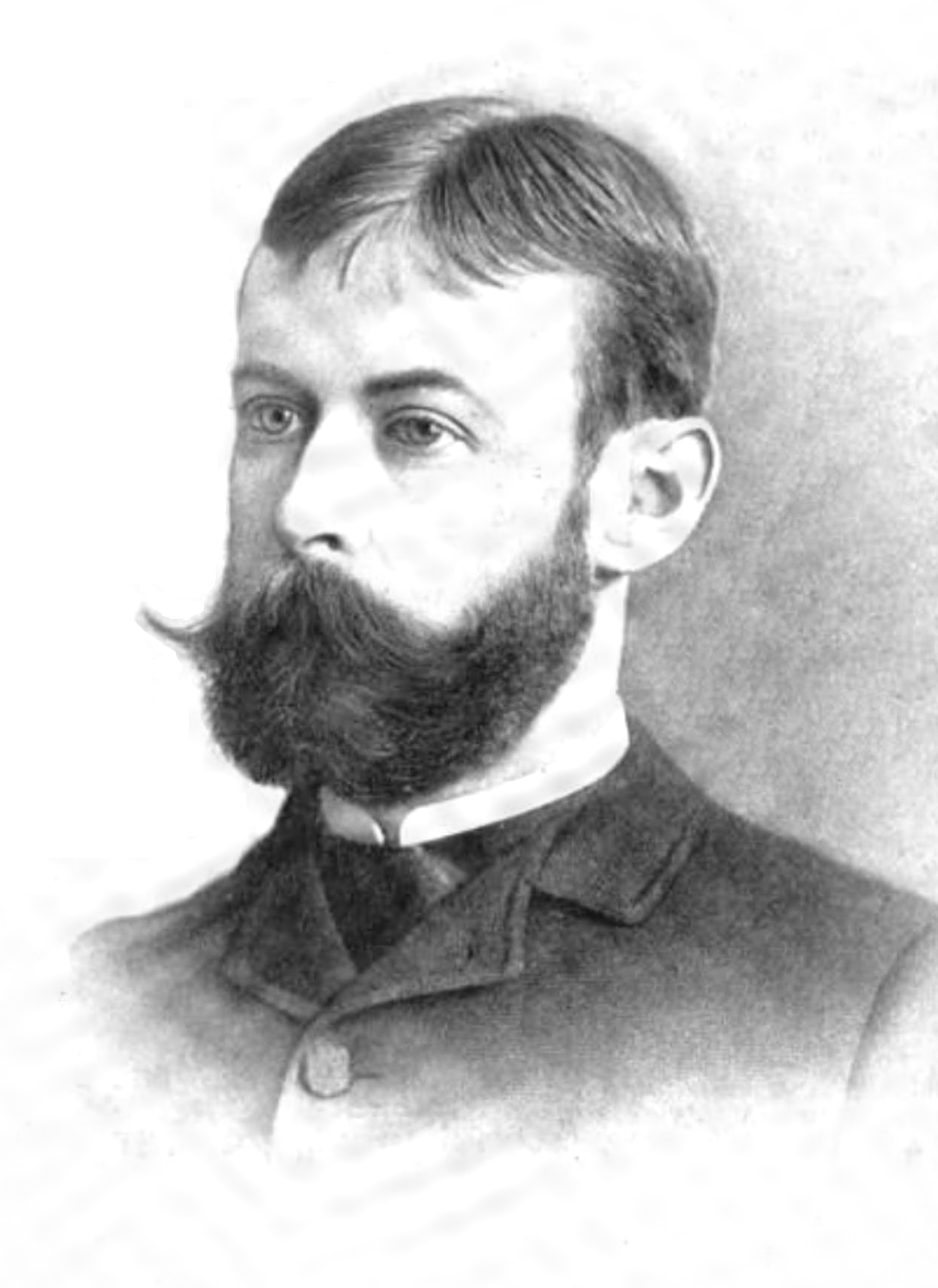
- Portrait of Fuller in the August–September 1895 edition of The Bookman
- Born: January 9, 1857; Chicago, Illinois, US
- Died: July 28, 1929 (aged 72); Chicago, Illinois, US
- Occupations: Novelist, short story writer
- Writing career
- Notable work: Bertram Cope's Year
- Movements: Realism; Naturalism; Gay literature

Henry Blake Fuller (January 9, 1857 – July 28, 1929) was an American novelist and short story writer. He was born and worked in Chicago, Illinois. He is perhaps the earliest novelist from Chicago to gain a national reputation. His exploration of city life was seen as revelatory, and later in his life he was perhaps the earliest established American author to explore homosexuality in fiction.

== Career ==
Fuller's earliest works were travel romances set in Italy that featured allegorical characters. Both The Chevalier of Pensieri–Vani (1890) and The Châtelaine of La Trinité (1892) bear some thematic resemblance to the works of Henry James, whose primary interest was in the contrast between American and European ways of life. Fuller's first two books appealed to the genteel tastes of cultivated New Englanders such as Charles Eliot Norton and James Russell Lowell, who took Fuller's work as a promising sign of a burgeoning literary culture in what was then still largely the frontier city of Chicago.

Fuller then turned to literary realism, writing The Cliff-Dwellers (1893), what is perhaps the first novel set among the skyscrapers and frenetic business culture of modern-day Chicago. The novel shocked and outraged Chicago readers, who found its unflattering portrait of the city jarring. The novel won the praise of the influential critic and novelist William Dean Howells, whose positive review did much to secure Fuller's position as an important regional realist. Novels like The Cliff-Dwellers and With the Procession (1895) were influenced by the social realism of Howells, who described American institutions being transformed by the economic and demographic changes of the late nineteenth century, although the scenes of violence in The Cliff-Dwellers feature elements of naturalism not to be found in Howells' novels. With the Procession, though realistic, was kindlier in touch, with humor playing over its seriousness, unlike the relentless realism of The Cliff-Dwellers. Fuller's preference for Howells over James is the subject of one of Fuller's important unpublished essays entitled "Howells or James?"

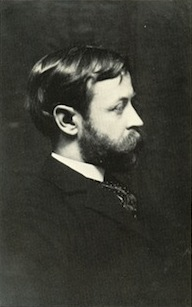
Fuller, c. 1893

Fuller also wrote twelve one-act plays, collected in The Puppet Booth (1896). He wrote for various journals, including The Dial, and he provided some editorial assistance to Poetry in its early years.

While he is considered one of the important novelists of Chicago's early years, his own relation to the city was often strained. The scion of one of Chicago's early settler families, he found the increasingly industrial and multicultural nature of the city offputting. His ambivalence is expressed in The Cliff-Dwellers and With the Procession, both of which are set in Chicago. The Cliff-Dwellers is one of the first novels to treat at length social life in the new, skyscraper environment that was pioneered in Chicago.

Perhaps his finest achievement is the controversial Bertram Cope's Year (1919), a subtle novel about homosexuals. Fuller self-published the novel in Chicago after unsuccessfully making the rounds of several New York publishing houses. Set on the campus of Northwestern University in Evanston, Illinois, it featured an attractive young English instructor who becomes the elusive object of desire for several young women and at least two men of different ages. Cope's primary emotional attachment is to his effeminate college chum Arthur Lemoyne, who comes to Evanston to live with Cope until Lemoyne is expelled from the campus for making a backstage pass at another male student while dressed as a woman. The novel ends on an ambiguous note concerning the issue of Cope's sexuality. It received less than enthusiastic reviews from critics who did not understand the book's satirical intentions. It puzzled critics and embarrassed his friends. Upon its republication in 1998, it received enthusiastic reviews.

In 1898, Fuller was also one of the founding members of the Eagle's Nest Art Colony in Illinois. He wrote a column of art criticism for the New York Evening Post.

== Personal life ==
Fuller's grave at Oak Woods Cemetery

Fuller was born in Chicago on January 9, 1857. He never married. His journals from his teenage days make it clear he was in love with some dormitory roommates at Allison Classical Academy. At the age of nineteen, he wrote in an imaginary personal advertisement: "I would pass by twenty beautiful women to look upon a handsome man."

At the age of 34 he wrote that he was in love with an adolescent boy who had blue eyes and strawberry blonde hair. Five years later, Fuller wrote and published a short play, At Saint Judas's, about a gay man who commits suicide at the wedding of his former lover. It is credited with being the first American play dealing explicitly with homosexuality. In 1924 Fuller embarked upon the last of his many European tours with William Emery Shepherd, a 24-year-old college student. Their letters do not indicate their relationship was anything but a friendship. The trip exhausted Fuller, who continued writing literary reviews for a variety of newspapers and magazines upon his return to Chicago, as well as a novel that was published posthumously.

Fuller died in Chicago on July 28, 1929, "at the home of Wakeman T. Ryan, with whom he had lived for the last three years." His death was ascribed to "heart disease, aggravated by the heat." He was buried at Oak Woods Cemetery.

== Reputation ==
In 2000, Fuller was posthumously inducted into the Chicago Gay and Lesbian Hall of Fame for his contributions to gay literature. He was inducted into the Chicago Literary Hall of Fame in 2017, which also created the "Fuller Award", honoring "lifetime contributions to literature".

== Works ==
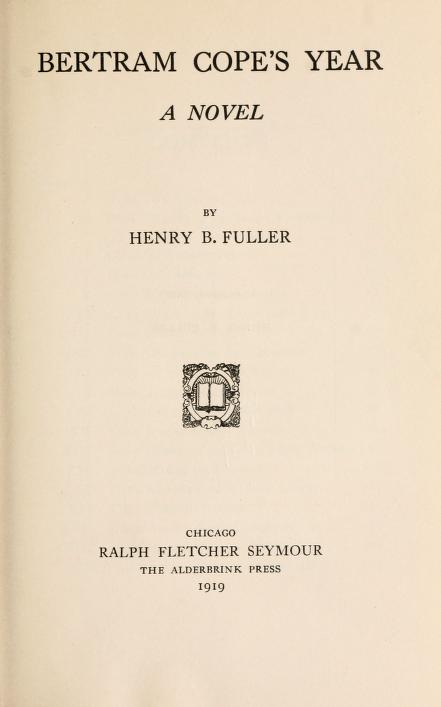
Original title page for Bertram Cope's Year (1919)

- The Chevalier of Pensieri–Vani (Boston: J. G. Cupples Co., 1890, under pseudonym Stanton Page)
- The Châtelaine of La Trinité (NY: The Century Co., 1892)
- The Cliff-Dwellers (NY: Harper & Brothers, 1893)
- With the Procession (1895)
- The Puppet-Booth: Twelve Plays (NY: The Century Co., 1896)
- From the Other Side: Stories of Transatlantic Travel (1898)
- The Last Refuge (1900)
- Under the Skylights (1901)
- Waldo Trench and Others: Stories of Americans in Italy (NY: Charles Scribner's Sons, 1908)
- Lines Long and Short: Biographical Sketches in Various Rhythms (Boston: Houghton Mifflin, 1917)
- On the Stairs (Boston: Houghton Mifflin, 1918)
- Bertram Cope's Year (Chicago: Alderbrink Press, 1919)
- Gardens of this World (NY: Alfred A. Knopf, 1929)
