= Highland Park Public Library (Illinois) =

Public library in Highland Park, Illinois

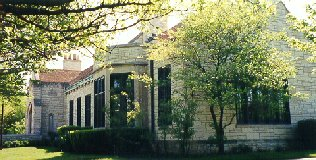
- The Highland Park (Illinois) Public Library
- 42°11′4.99″N 87°47′48.01″W
- Location: 494 Laurel Ave, Highland Park, Illinois, USA
- Type: Public library
- Established: April 7, 1888

Collection
- Size: 210,513

Access and use
- Circulation: 340,366
- Population served: 29,763

Other information
- Director: Heidi Smith
- Employees: 42
- Website: www.hplibrary.org

The Highland Park Public Library is the public library serving Highland Park, Illinois. It is located at 494 Laurel Ave across the intersection from the Metra station.

== History ==
At the July 7, 1887 meeting of the City Council, a number of citizens presented a petition requesting that the council establish and maintain a public library and on September 14, 1887, the Highland Park City Council adopted an ordinance for the establishment of a tax-supported public library and appropriated $260 annually for its maintenance. Books began circulating from the library on April 7, 1888.

In 1903 a commission from the Highland Park Woman's Club contacted Mr. Andrew Carnegie for a financial donation to construct a new library. Mr. Carnegie was willing to donate $10,000 for the construction of a library building in Highland Park, provided that the city owned the site. Mr. Arthur C. Thomson, of Brookline, Massachusetts offered to give the city a piece of property upon which to locate the new library. The lot that he gave to the library was located on Laurel Ave. one block south of Central Street, and just east of St. Johns Ave.

By 1927 it was evident to the Board that the Carnegie library was inadequate and that only an entirely new library would do. The population of Highland Park, just 4,209 in 1910, had grown to approximately 10,000. The City Council proposed a levy increase spread over 7 years to raise the estimated $150,000 to build the new library. The Chicago architectural firm of Holmes and Flinn (Morris Grant Holmes and Raymond W. Flinn) designed the original modified Gothic style structure built of Wisconsin limestone with Indiana limestone trim. The new library was dedicated on Sept. 20, 1931.

In 1960, the Library Board decided to build an addition on the west side of the existing library. Bertram Weber was hired to design what is now known as the Children's Wing in the same modified Gothic style of the original building and in 1976 a modern adult wing (20,000 sq. ft.) designed by the firm Wendt, Cedarholm & Tippens was added to the south of the original building.

In FY05, the library had 611,655 circulation items and 23,187 registered cardholders with a total of 361,614 library visits, who constitute 77% of the city's residents. According to the 2003 Citizen Survey of the City of Highland Park, however, 26,433 (88%) of the residents made use of library services.
