= Soldier with the Green Whiskers =

Captain-General Omby Amby, the Soldier with the Green Whiskers
- Oz character
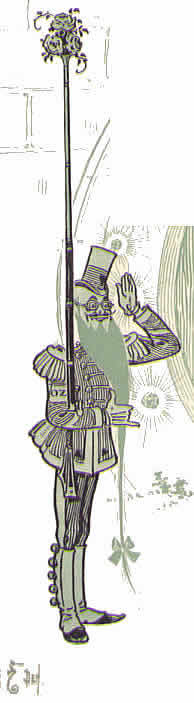
- The Soldier with the Green Whiskers art by W.W. Denslow
- First appearance: The Wonderful Wizard of Oz (1900)
- Created by: L. Frank Baum

In-universe information
- Alias: Wantowin Battles
- Species: Human
- Gender: Male
- Title: Captain-General
- Occupation: Bodyguard to Princess Ozma and Police Force of the Emerald City
- Spouse: Unnamed wife with terrible temper Tollydiggle (possibly a mistake)
- Nationality: Munchkin (questionable)

The Soldier with the Green Whiskers is a character from the fictional Land of Oz who appears in the classic children's series of Oz books by American author L. Frank Baum and his successors. He is introduced in The Wonderful Wizard of Oz (1900). His name is Omby Amby, but this was so obliquely stated that he also became known briefly as Wantowin Battles.

== Classic Oz books ==
In The Wonderful Wizard of Oz, the Soldier with the Green Whiskers (real name not yet revealed) is the head guard of the Royal Army of Oz. His job is to protect the Emerald City and its residents. He gladly escorts the four main protagonists Dorothy, the Scarecrow, Tin Woodman and Cowardly Lion through the streets of the Emerald City upon their first visit. He leads them all to the royal palace of the Wizard of Oz, where he forces them to wipe their feet upon a plush green carpet before entering. When he blows upon his green whistle, a pretty maid dressed in green silk named Jellia Jamb appears to show the four guests to their private rooms while staying in Oz's palace.

The Soldier with the Green Whiskers appears to be the tallest citizen in the city, and is often described as being "very tall" with a very thick and long green beard that flows nearly to the ground. After the Wizard's departure from Oz, he leaves the Scarecrow to rule the city in his stead. The Soldier with the Green Whiskers is the one who tells the King Scarecrow that Glinda the Good Witch might know of a way for Dorothy to get back to her homeland in Kansas. The four protagonists take his advice and travel to the land of the southern Quadlings to seek its ruler.

In the second Oz book The Marvelous Land of Oz (1904), it is revealed his appearance is largely for show. When attacked by General Jinjur's all female Army of Revolt, he admits that his gun, which was usually drawn containing flowers, is not kept loaded for fear of accidents. He tells her to "wait right here" while he looks for the powder and shot that he has misplaced. After his ineffectual attempts to save the Emerald City from invasion, which the Scarecrow chastises, he vows to disguise himself by shaving his beard. However, he lets it grow back once Princess Ozma has been established on the throne as Oz's true ruler.

== Omby Amby ==
In Ozma of Oz, we are introduced to the Royal Army of Oz, consisting of twenty-six officers and one private. This private, Omby Amby, proves to be the only brave soldier in the Army, so Princess Ozma promotes him to Captain-General and makes him her personal Body Guard. He has a fierce moustache (not noted in the text until The Emerald City of Oz, but shown in the illustrations from the beginning), but is capable if gentle-natured, unlike the pompous officers, who come up with excuses not to fight and act very cowardly when facing the Giant with the Hammer. Omby Amby gets inadvertently flung onto the arm of the Giant and must jump down onto the soft body of the Scarecrow, and the officers more outwardly show their fear than the private. An officer mentions that they have a few other privates, but Omby Amby is the only one we ever see. He is cleaning the barracks when Ozma calls him into the banquet for his promotion.

When the Wizard returns, he recognizes Omby Amby, who greets him accompanied by Jellia Jamb, but wonders what happened to his "green whiskers." Omby Amby admits to have shaven them off.

As Omby Amby, he appears briefly in The Road to Oz and is tour guide to Aunt Em and Uncle Henry in The Emerald City of Oz. It is he who informs them of the "Defensive Settlements of Oz" such as Rigmarole Town and Flutterbudget Center, where people are exiled for talking too much or worrying too much, respectively.

== In later books ==
When next we see him, in The Patchwork Girl of Oz, he is again referred to as the Soldier with the Green Whiskers; he is the only soldier in the Army, his beard is back to its normal length, and is now said to make him look taller than he really is. He is also referred to as the Emerald City Police Force. This may explain why Jack Snow described Oz's jailer, Tollydiggle, as his wife — in The Magical Mimics in Oz, Betsy Bobbin is shown giving Omby Amby flowers and asking them to give them to his wife, Tollydiggle. No indication of any such relationship is found in Baum's books. Indeed, Baum does state that the Soldier has a wife, but she is one with a "terrible temper" — at least according to Jinjur — something not in evidence in Tollydiggle. Two lines may indicate where this interpretation comes from — he addresses Tollydiggle as "my dear" (fairly commonly used with friends in Oz books, especially from the Wizard), and that he says, "I know that very well," when Tollydiggle says, "it is impossible for anyone to escape from this house."

While he continued to appear in most Oz books, his next major appearance was not until The Wishing Horse of Oz, in which his beard turning red was the first indication of the magic of Skamperoo in his bid to conquer the Emerald City. It is initially suspected to be the red magic of Jinnicky, but Gloma, the Witch of the Black Forest (implicitly the Good Witch of the West), assures Dorothy that it is green magic at work. With Ozma and many of her advisers, he is imprisoned at the bottom of Lake Lightning.

In Ozoplaning with the Wizard of Oz, author Ruth Plumly Thompson constructed an elaborate family history for him under the name Wantowin Battles. In this book, Thompson portrays Wantowin as a pompous coward with bad aim who loves to eat pickles. Jack Snow gave Wantowin, without a surname, his own entry in Who's Who in Oz as a result. John R. Neill's editor picked up on the name and used it once in the rewritten portion of The Wonder City of Oz.

Snow also described him as Keeper of the Gates and Royal Army of Oz, and omitted an entry from Who's Who in Oz of the Guardian of the Gates, who is clearly not the same person, as they speak to each other in The Wonderful Wizard of Oz, The Marvelous Land of Oz, and The Patchwork Girl of Oz. In The Scalawagons of Oz, Omby Amby offers to take the Guardian's place so that he can take a Scalawagon to see his cousin, Oompa.

James Haff did a major analysis of the character in The Baum Bugle. He notes that he does not seem to have any real friends, although Haff does not note that he is shown playing checkers with Pastoria in The Yellow Knight of Oz, and in Neill's books he appears to be good friends with the Guardian of the Gates, and is even shown waltzing with him in The Scalawagons of Oz after getting up from a game of marbles when the music begins to play and having no one else around. Ironically, although Neill both wrote and illustrated, the Soldier is shown in illustration dancing with a woman in spite of the text.

== Portrayals ==
The Soldier with the Green Whiskers appears in many adaptations, sometimes altered to be a guard who lacks the green whiskers.

The following productions have featured a version of the character:

- The Patchwork Girl of Oz (1914) - Frank Bristol as The Soldier with the Green Whiskers
- The Land of Oz, a Sequel to the 'Wizard of Oz' (1932) - Caryl Roberts as The Soldier with the Green Whiskers (also Glenna Vaughn as Jellia Jamb disguised as the Soldier)
- The Wizard of Oz (1939) - Frank Morgan as "The Guard" (who allows Dorothy and her three companions into the Wizard's castle)
- Journey Back to Oz (1974) - Dallas McKennon as Omby Amby
- Mago de Oz Cuento de Frank Baum (1985) - Jorge Rosette as the Guard
- Wicked (2003) - a guard in the Emerald City, later seen at Glinda and Fiyero's engagement party

== Sources ==
- Snow, Jack (1954). Who's Who in Oz. University of Michigan: Reilly & Lee. ISBN 978-0872261884.
