= Jinnicky the Red Jinn =

Jinnicky
- Oz character
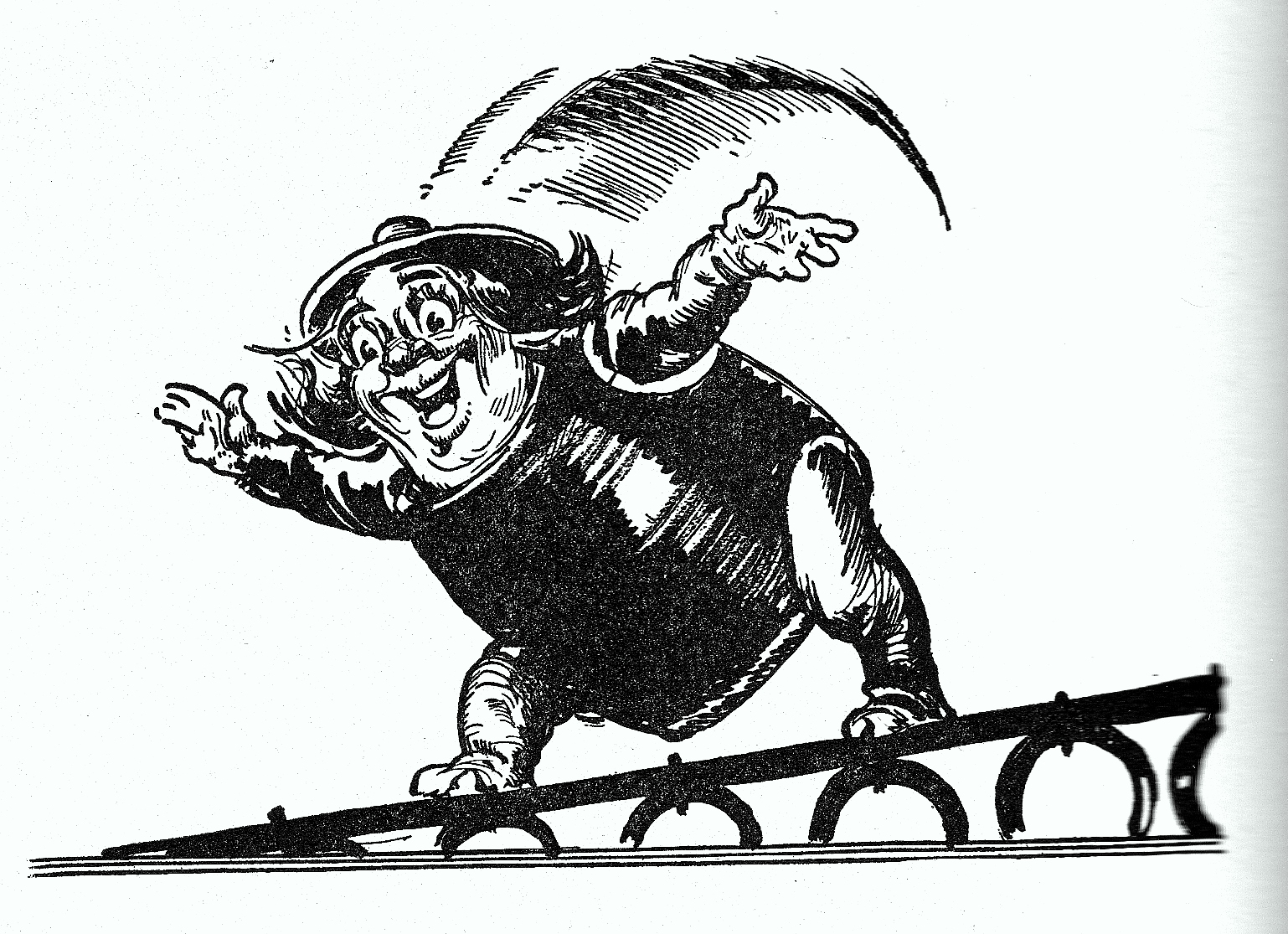
- Illustration by John R. Neill from The Silver Princess in Oz
- First appearance: Jack Pumpkinhead of Oz (1929)
- Last appearance: Yankee in Oz (1972)
- Created by: Ruth Plumly Thompson

In-universe information
- Species: Jinn
- Gender: male
- Title: Red Jinn
- Occupation: Wizard of Ev
- Nationality: Ev

The Red Jinn, later known as Jinnicky, is one of Ruth Plumly Thompson's most frequently occurring characters in her Oz books. According to David L. Greene and Dick Martin, he is "the most fondly remembered" of all the characters Thompson created. The Jinn is a supernatural force that lives in a large red ginger jar.

== History ==
The Red Jinn was first introduced in Jack Pumpkinhead of Oz (1929) as a mysterious figure who educates Jack Pumpkinhead on the use of the Pirate Sack. Although a detailed description is included in the text, Jack Pumpkinhead of Oz includes no illustrations of the Red Jinn aside from a gruesome color plate that did not appear outside the first edition, in which he has massive piercings.

He was reintroduced, drawn, and given the name Jinnicky in The Purple Prince of Oz (1932); he also appeared in the follow-up, The Silver Princess in Oz (1938). He makes a cameo appearance in The Wishing Horse of Oz (1935), and he is the principal pre-existing character in Thompson's sub-canonical penultimate Oz book, Yankee in Oz (1972). Jack Snow apparently thought the Red Jinn was a separate character, for he considered The Purple Prince of Oz to be Jinnicky's first appearance in Who's Who in Oz, though he did not include a separate Red Jinn entry.

Jinnicky's body is housed inside a large red ginger jar, complete with lid. He speaks in a deep voice. Neill's art originally depicted him with massive piercings, but these were later omitted and are not referred to in the text. His disposition is generally jolly and friendly, and he is treated sympathetically by his author. His preferred mode of transportation is a flying jinrikisha which is pulled only by magic. He lives in a red glass palace in the northeast of the Land of Ev, attended by his Advizier, Alibabble, and Addie the Adding Adder.

In addition to these, Jinnicky owns a large number of slaves. This contrasts with the jinns of the Arabian Nights, who are usually slaves themselves, such as the one in Aladdin's lamp. All of the slaves that are described are explicitly Black people. The best known of the slaves is Ginger, whose service to a magic dinner bell is an important literary device.

He also makes smaller appearances in The Wishing Horse of Oz and Yankee in Oz (in which Jinnicky is instrumental in liberating the Emerald City palace from the primary antagonist Badmannah the Giant), and is fleetingly referenced in Pirates in Oz and Captain Salt in Oz. Because most of his appearances except Wishing Horse and Silver Princess are protected under U.S. copyright, he does not figure in books by post-Thompson authors, with the notable exception of Lin Carter, whose estate was able to pay to use the character in his novel, The Tired Tailor of Oz (published posthumously in 2001). Jinnicky entered the public domain on 1 January 2025 when his first novel's copyright expired.

Thompson refers to Jinnicky as "The Wizard of Ev" in The Silver Princess in Oz and Yankee in Oz.

Jack Snow listed Jinnicky in his encyclopedia Who's Who in Oz in 1954. The Jinn is subject of some confusion in this reference book. Snow lists Purple Prince rather than Jack Pumpkinhead as his first appearance, and states that Ginger is the servant of Baron Mogodore, the main antagonist of the earlier novel. In addition, Snow takes Neill's drawing of Jinnicky's barber from Purple Prince and presents it as a portrait of the unrelated Barber of Rash from The Hungry Tiger of Oz, leading to a popular fan theory that Jinnicky gave the unemployed barber a job - something which Thompson never implied.
