= The Silver Princess in Oz =

1938 book by Ruth Plumly Thompson

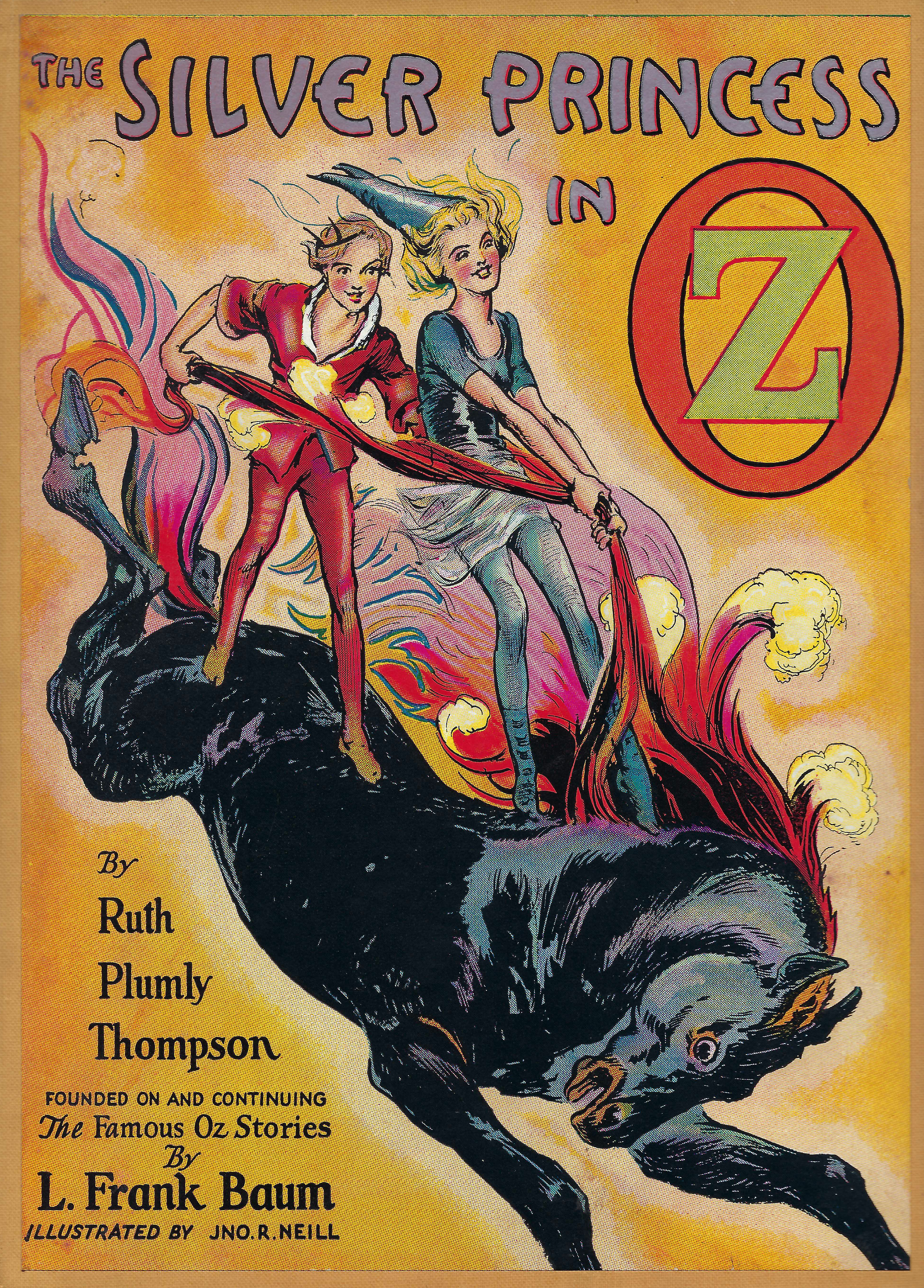
- Cover of The Silver Princess in Oz
- Author: Ruth Plumly Thompson
- Illustrator: John R. Neill
- Publication date: January 1, 1938
- Pages: 255
- Preceded by: Handy Mandy in Oz
- Followed by: Ozoplaning with the Wizard of Oz

The Silver Princess in Oz (1938) is the thirty-second book in the Oz series created by L. Frank Baum and his successors, and the eighteenth written by Ruth Plumly Thompson. It was illustrated by John R. Neill. The novel was followed by Ozoplaning with the Wizard of Oz (1939).

In this story, young King Randy of Regalia (from Thompson's The Purple Prince of Oz) is visited by his old friend, Kabumpo, the Elegant Elephant of Pumperdink. Together, they set out to visit their friend Jinnicky the Red Jinn (also from Purple Prince) in the Land of Ev. On the way, they meet Planetty, the silver Princess from Anuther Planet, and her fire-breathing colt, Thun. When they reach Jinnicky's palace, they find that Jinnicky has been deposed and enchanted by an untrustworthy slave.

Thompson's novel is notable in that she avoids the use of Baum's classic characters and relies on those of her own invention (as is true of some of her other later books, like Captain Salt in Oz); and also for the fact that author and artist portray the followers of Jinnicky as turbanned black African slaves, with images and language which today could be considered racist.

Planetty and Thun return in Jeff Freedman's 1994 novel The Magic Dishpan of Oz.

== Reception ==
The Indianapolis News observed, "Bits of the dialogue may annoy the adult, for the writing sometimes seems deliberately childish rather than childlike, but the child, himself, won't be bothered by such details. To him, the Silver Princess will belong with all the other fascinating inhabitants of Oz."

In A Brief Guide to Oz, Paul Simpson notes, "The book has attracted considerable criticism for the casually cruel way in which Planetty treats a group of black slaves, and the way in which she compares them to unthinking beasts."

In the Dictionary of Literary Biography, Michael Patrick Hearn is also unimpressed, writing, "In her last Oz books, Thompson wildly stretched her imaginative powers, at times risking loss of the child's perspective. The Silver Princess in Oz, in its struggle to be new, is uncomfortably grotesque."

The Oz books
Previous book: Handy Mandy in Oz	The Silver Princess in Oz; 1938	Next book: Ozoplaning with the Wizard of Oz
