= Handy Mandy in Oz =

1937 book by Ruth Plumly Thompson

- Original dust jacket of Handy Mandy in Oz
- Author: Ruth Plumly Thompson
- Illustrator: John R. Neill
- Cover artist: John R. Neill
- Language: English
- Series: The Oz Books
- Genre: Fantasy
- Publisher: Reilly & Lee
- Publication date: 1937
- Publication place: United States
- Media type: Print (Hardcover)
- Pages: 246
- Preceded by: Captain Salt in Oz
- Followed by: The Silver Princess in Oz

Handy Mandy in Oz (1937) is the thirty-first book in the Oz series created by L. Frank Baum and his successors, and the seventeenth written by Ruth Plumly Thompson. It was illustrated by John R. Neill. The novel was followed by The Silver Princess in Oz (1938).

== Plot ==
The book's heroine is an "honest and industrious" goat-girl named Mandy, who grazes her flock on the slopes of Mt. Mern (a location otherwise unidentified).

The story opens with a bang and a splash: an underground spring erupts in a geyser that blasts Mandy into the sky. The force propels her across the Deadly Desert to Oz; she lands in the little principality of Keretaria in the Munchkin Country, her impact cushioned by the power of a magic blue daisy. Mandy finds a silver hammer, and meets a white ox with golden horns; she blunders into the court of King Kerr of Keretaria and his courtiers. They are outraged by the intrusion of such an outlandish figure — for Mandy has seven arms and hands. As Mandy explains,

"This iron hand...I use for ironing, lifting hot pots from the stove and all horrid sort of hard work; this leather hand I keep for beating rugs, dusting, sweeping, and so on; this wooden hand I use for churning and digging in the garden; these two red rubber hands for dishwashing and scrubbing, and my two fine white hands I keep for holding and braiding my hair."

Mandy, for her part, is amazed to meet so many two-handed people; on Mt. Mern, everyone has seven hands.

Mandy is reprieved from the dungeons by Nox the Royal Ox, who takes her as his personal slave. Mandy and Nox quickly become friends. (It is Nox who gives the girl her nickname, Handy Mandy.) Nox is preoccupied by the political situation of Keretaria: the rightful king, a boy named Kerry, has disappeared, and his throne has been usurped by his uncle Kerr. Mandy discovers that the Royal Ox's horns have magic powers: they can be unscrewed from his head, and when they are, the right horn grants wishes, and his left horn offers clues. When a clue indicates that King Kerry can be found at a place called the Silver Mountain, the enterprising Mandy leads Nox on a search for the missing monarch.

They swim rivers and survive a flood on their way to the Gillikin Country. A doorway hidden under a waterfall leads them to a subterranean world under the Silver Mountain. The domain is ruled by an evil and ambitious tyrant called the Wizard Wutz. Wutz controls a subversive network of spies and secret agents located in many parts of the land of Oz. He is plotting to have his agents steal all the main magical artifacts of Oz. They actually do steal the Magic Picture, Glinda's Great Book of Records, and the jug that is the confinement vessel of Ruggedo, the Gnome King (he was transformed into a jug at the end of Pirates in Oz). Mandy and Nox learn that old King Kerr is one of Wutz's agents and that Wutz is holding the rightful King Kerry prisoner.

Wutz's machinations have of course attracted the notice of Princess Ozma, the Wizard of Oz, Princess Dorothy, the Scarecrow, and their friends and allies. Yet their efforts to solve their difficulties are frustrated, since they lack the Magic Picture and Book of Records.

When Mandy and Nox confront Wutz, he imprisons them in a dungeon under his mountain. Mandy accidentally liberates Ruggedo from the jug. Wutz and Ruggedo instantly become allies in evil and set off for the Emerald City to complete their conquest. Mandy's silver hammer, though, has proven to be magic; striking it calls forth a helpful purple elf named "Himself", who has formidable magic powers. With the hammer and elf, the blue daisy, and Nox's magical horns, Mandy and the ox escape confinement, find and rescue King Kerry, and reach Ozma's palace in time to frustrate the plans of Wutz and Ruggedo. Himself the elf transforms the two villains into potted cacti. (This is the last appearance of Ruggedo the Gnome King in the "Famous Forty" Oz books, though he does re-appear in the works of later Oz authors.)

Ozma restores order and repairs damage with her Magic Belt. Wutz's spies and agents are transformed into moles; Kerry is returned to his throne. Mandy is rewarded with an emerald necklace and a luxury she has longed for — gloves; Ozma gives her seven sets of seven gloves for her seven hands. After a month at home on Mt. Mern, Mandy returns to Oz (with her goats) via wishing pill, for a new life.

The plot of this book strongly resembles that of Baum's The Lost Princess of Oz, in which Ugu the shoemaker steals magical artifacts and kidnaps a ruler in a conquest plot, just like the Wizard of Wutz. Indeed, Trot comments on the plot resemblance in Chapter 14 of Handy Mandy.

== The characters ==
Thompson later wrote a 48-line poem that provides an origin for Mandy, though this origin is inconsistent with the novel. In the poem, Mandy is an artificial and created being, made of "wood and tin...wire and cloth and plaster...." She was built as a sort of domestic robot to perform housework. The novel, in contrast, clearly indicates that Mandy, despite her inanimate parts, comes from a race of seven-handed people.

The principal villain, the Wizard Wutz, is another unusual character for Oz: a handsome, smooth, graceful but pure-evil villain who commands a hierarchical organization of subversives, with planted spies in positions of power all over the land of Oz, and a systematic collective strategy for overthrowing the government.

Ruggedo the Gnome King makes his last appearance in the Oz-Canon of Forty here. It's very small, barely more than a cameo. He begins having been transformed into a jug (see Pirates in Oz) and ends transformed into a cactus.

== Reception ==
The Vancouver Sun wrote, "You will want to read this book from cover to cover before you give it to some lucky boy or girl. The illustrations by John R. Neill are whimsically appropriate." The Indianapolis News agreed, saying, "Handy Mandy is one of [Thompson's] best books... The best of all Christmas presents for children."

In the 1983 Dictionary of Literary Biography, Michael Patrick Hearn was less than impressed, writing, "In her last Oz books, Thompson wildly stretched her imaginative powers, at times risking loss of the child's perspective... The seven-armed goat girl of Handy Mandy in Oz is certainly one of the oddest and thus one of the least sympathetic heroines in juvenile literature."

The Oz books
Previous book: Captain Salt in Oz	Handy Mandy in Oz; 1937	Next book: The Silver Princess in Oz
