= The Magic Dishpan of Oz =

1994 children's book by Jeff Freedman

- First edition
- Author: Jeff Freedman
- Illustrator: Denis McFarling
- Cover artist: Denis McFarling
- Language: English
- Series: The Oz Books
- Genre: Children's novel Fantasy
- Publisher: Emerald City Press / Books of Wonder
- Publication date: 1994
- Publication place: United States
- Media type: Print
- Pages: 108
- ISBN: 978-0-929605-36-4
- OCLC: 33988248

The Magic Dishpan of Oz is a 1994 children's book written by Jeff Freedman and illustrated by Denis McFarling. The book is a contribution to the ever-growing Oz series, originated by L. Frank Baum and continued by many successors.

The book was published by the Emerald City Press, an imprint of Books of Wonder that specializes in Oz literature.

Freedman's book draws on the general Oz mythos, and in particular on two volumes of the "Famous Forty" — Baum's The Lost Princess of Oz (1917) and Ruth Plumly Thompson's The Silver Princess in Oz (1938). The magic dishpan of Freedman's title is the diamond-encrusted golden dishpan that belonged to Cayke the Cookie Cook in the Baum book.

== Synopsis ==
The protagonists of The Magic Dishpan of Oz are two sisters, seven-year-old Rebecca and three-year-old Shoshanna. Natives of Oregon, the two girls are playing by a stream near their home one day, when they find an unusual frog. The animal seems to want to communicate with them, and Shoshanna thinks she can understand it. The frog (they come to call it "Froggie") also appears to want them to follow it; and when the girls do, Froggie leads them to a semi-submerged object, a gem-studded gold dishpan. The girls take their new treasure home. At one point, Rebecca says, "Oh, I just wish I knew where this dishpan came from!" The magic talisman obligingly transports the girls (and frog) to Oz.

Familiar as they are with Oz from books, Rebecca and Shoshanna are unpleasantly surprised by the welcome they receive. Landing in the Winkie Country, they find that the locals are hostile and suspicious, so much so that the girls are locked in a barn overnight, so that they can be turned over to "our illustrious Magician" the next day. With the aid of some friendly talking sheep, girls escape with the dishpan. (And frog. They concluded that Froggie is under an enchantment, since he does not gain the ability to speak when he comes to Oz. At one point, Shoshanna impulsively tries to kiss the frog, but he evades her lips.) The children make their way toward the Emerald City along the yellow brick road. In an abandoned house, the girls find Scraps the Patchwork Girl, the Scarecrow, and the Tin Woodman, disassembled. The three Oz inhabitants are quickly restored to normal.

The children learn that Oz has been infiltrated by malignant magicians who have disrupted the normal order. The party (girls and Ozites) sets out for the palace of Glinda, but is quickly waylaid by a Magician and a hundred of his followers. The enchanter calls himself the Magician of Suspicion; he specializes in spreading distrust and ill-feeling. By sowing discord among their guards, the party manage to escape from their captors (with dishpan, and frog). They now turn toward the Gillikin Country to look for Planetty, the Silver Princess. After further adventures and conflicts, the girls and their Ozite friends unite with Planetty and her followers, and together they move toward Glinda's palace in the Quadling Country. Froggie pays court to Planetty with gifts of flowers; the Princess kisses him, and he turns into the Frogman from Lost Princess. The Frogman had been enchanted and sent out of Oz with the dishpan, by the Magician who has taken over the Emerald City.

Glinda is not at her palace. The party consult her Great Book of Records to learn how to restore Oz. They discover that the main figures of Oz, Glinda, Princess Ozma, and the Wizard, have been turned into the emeralds and rubies that decorate the dishpan. As is fitting in a fairy tale, it is Shoshanna, the smallest and youngest member of the group, who restores the missing principals, just in time for Glinda to overcome the Magician of Ignorance and return Oz to its former state.

== The villains ==
The Magicians of Mischief are not restricted to the Land of Oz; to the contrary, they plague the entire world. They have come to Oz because they "have suffered a few temporary setbacks in the outside world." They find the naive residents of Oz easy to influence. The Magician of Ignorance claims to be the most powerful of his group. Glinda cannot destroy them; but she deprives the Magician of Ignorance of his magic staff: "without his cane, he won't be able to cause nearly as much trouble."

== Denouement ==
In the context of the Oz mythos, Freedman ends his plot with a major twist on Ozite magic. At the novel's climax, the prime authority figures and forces of benevolent power — Ozma, Glinda, and the Wizard — are unavailable. When the Great Book of Records is consulted, Rebecca suggests that they ask the Book what to do next — and the Book supplies the crucial knowledge that allows Good to triumph. There is no indication in Baum's canon that the Book of Records responds to questions. To the contrary, the Book's information is often cryptic and problematic; it can be as frustrating as it is helpful. The idea that the Book of Records can be questioned productively is Freedman's innovation.

(Conversely, it could be supposed that the Book has always had this faculty, and no one has thought to investigate the possibility. The idea that small children could discover something that wiser heads have missed is in keeping with the spirit of Oz.)

== Use of Thompson characters ==
Planetty the Silver Princess first appeared in The Silver Princess in Oz (1938) as the companion of King Randy of Regalia and Kabumpo the Elephant. Her debut novel lapsed from copyright prematurely in 1967. Randy and Kabumpo remained in copyright at the time Magic Dishpan came out, so Kabumpo is substituted by his (newly created) sister Kabina, and Randy is substituted by a knight named Sir Dynar, whose name is anagrammatic.
