= Ozoplaning with the Wizard of Oz =

1939 book by Ruth Plumly Thompson

- Cover of Ozoplaning with the Wizard of Oz.
- Author: Ruth Plumly Thompson
- Illustrator: John R. Neill
- Language: English
- Series: The Oz Books
- Genre: Fantasy
- Publisher: Reilly & Lee
- Publication date: 1939
- Publication place: United States
- Media type: print (hardcover)
- Preceded by: The Silver Princess in Oz
- Followed by: The Wonder City of Oz

Ozoplaning with the Wizard of Oz (1939) is the thirty-third book in the Oz series created by L. Frank Baum and his successors. It was the nineteenth and last written by Ruth Plumly Thompson until 1972's Yankee in Oz. It was illustrated by John R. Neill. The book was followed by The Wonder City of Oz (1940).

The phrase "The Wizard of Oz" was included in the title to coincide with the MGM film The Wizard of Oz, which was released the same year the novel was published. As such, the focus of the story is on characters who appeared in the first novel. Thompson focuses the book most strongly on Jellia Jamb, though that character was unnamed in the first novel.

== Synopsis ==
The story opens with a dinner party, attended by seven of the characters from Baum's inaugural book, including the castle-housemaid Jellia Jam. After the dinner, the Wizard takes his guests to a glass-domed building that contains two gleaming silver aircraft, the newly created ozoplanes. The Wizard has named them the Ozpril and the Oztober. The guests enthusiastically pile into the craft to inspect them.

The Soldier with the Green Whiskers is suddenly overcome by a violent stomach cramp from eating too many pickles. He slams into the control panel of the Oztober, causing it to take off. The Wizard, startled and appalled, takes the Ozpril in pursuit and in search of the Oztober, accompanied by Dorothy, the Cowardly Lion, and the Scarecrow.

Enduring a chaotic flight, the resourceful Tin Woodman eventually gets the Oztober under control; he lands in a previously unexplored sky-country called Stratovania. He enthusiastically but undiplomatically claims the place for Ozma as a colony of the Land of Oz. The ruler, Strutoovious the Seventh, also called "Strut of the Strat" for short, is outraged, and decides to turn the tables and conquer the land of Oz. He forces the Tin Woodman to fly him and his army to Oz, leaving Jellia and the Soldier behind in Stratovania.

The Wizard and company arrive at Stratovania in the second ozoplane. But the plane is blown up by the Stratovanians, and the Ozites have to leap off the edge of the skyland to save themselves, riding on winged staffs stolen from two Stratovanians. (The Stratovanians all own winged staffs and use them for transportation.)

The Wizard and his party land at Red Top Mountain in the Quadling Country. The place's rightful ruler, Princess Azarine, has escaped the clutches of the usurper Bustabo (an even worse villain than Strut) who captures the travelers. This villain sends the Wizard in search of Azarine, and holds the rest of the party hostage. The hostages escape, and meet up with the Wizard, Azarine, and her protectors, the great stag Shagomar and his wife Dear Deer. The group reaches the palace of Glinda, though the sorceress is absent with Ozma; the Wizard is able to use Glinda's magic to combat the Stratovanian invasion.

Strut and his forces reach the Emerald City; the residents flee or hide. Strut tries to obtain Ozma's Magic Belt from her safe, but is frustrated; the Wizard has united with Ozma and Glinda to rescue the Belt, the most powerful magical talisman of Oz. Once in possession of the Belt, Ozma transports Strut's army home and ends his bid for conquest. She turns the usurper Bustabo into a red squirrel, so that Azarine can resume her rightful place.

Thompson gives her protagonists some odd adversaries, including sky creatures called Spikers that are something like iridescent spiked blow-fishes, and a large fierce bugbear that is half insect and half bear. And she indulges in extravagant nonsensical tech talk, as with the Wizard's "elutherated altitude pills" and Glinda's "triple-edged, zentomatic transporter."

== Reception ==
The Indianapolis News said, "Ozoplaning is the best of the recent stories, for its fantasy has at least a foundation in reality." The Hartford Courant agreed, saying that Thompson "attains new peaks of adventure droll humor in Ozoplaning. In none of the 18 other Oz tales from her pen since 1921 has she more nearly approached the delightful wit and fascinating style of the original Oz chronicler."

The Oz books
| Previous book: The Silver Princess in Oz | Ozoplaning with the Wizard of Oz; 1938 | Next book: The Wonder City of Oz |
