= Land of Ev =

Fictional country in the Oz books

Ev
- The Oz series location
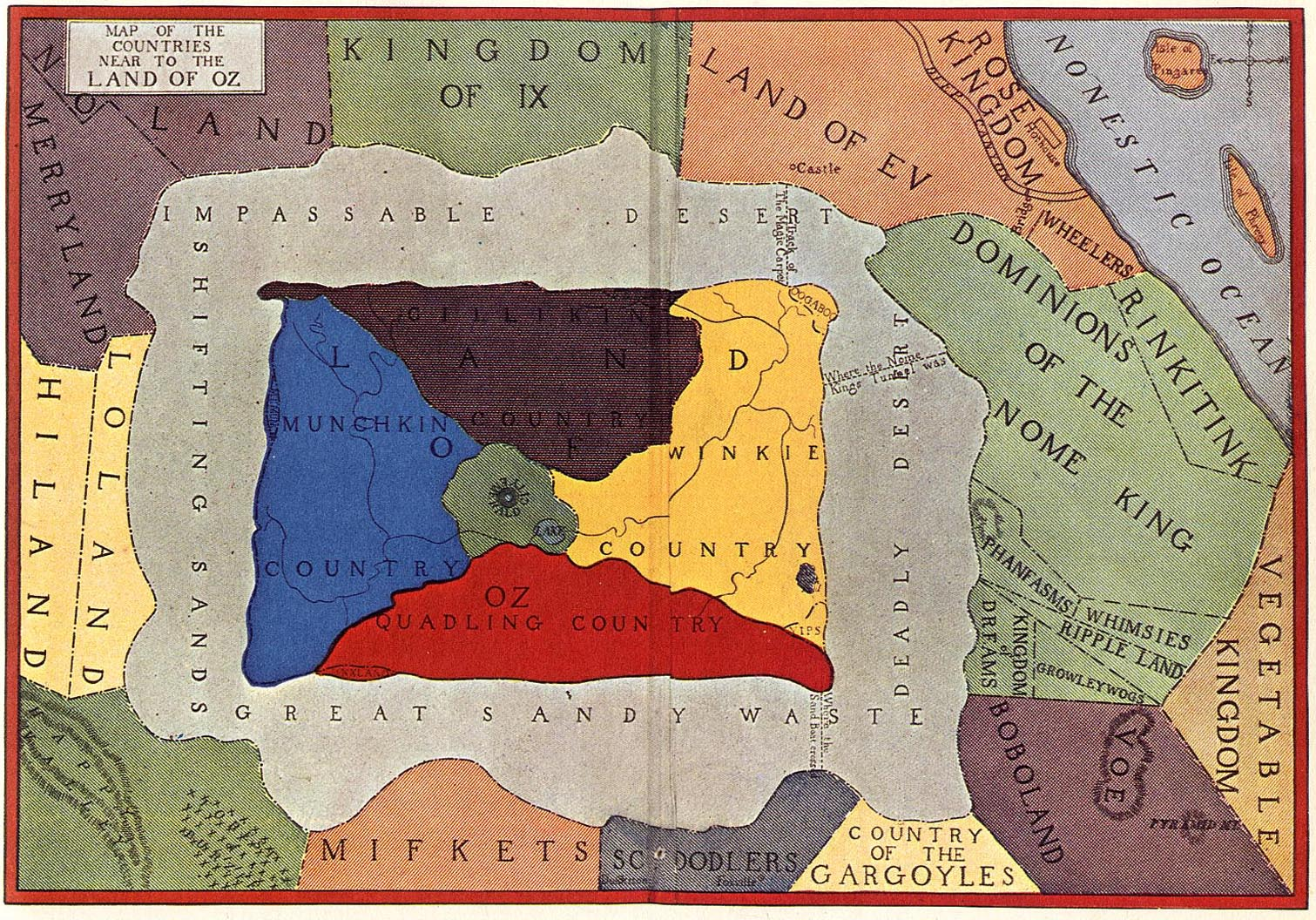
- Location of Ev (top right)

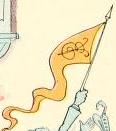
- Flag of Ev
- First appearance: Ozma of Oz
- Created by: L. Frank Baum
- Genre: Children's fantasy

In-universe information
- Other name: Land of Ev
- Type: Fairy country
- Ruled by: King Evardo
- Ethnic groups: Evians, Wheelers, Big Wigs, Blacks
- Location: Nonestica
- Locations: Evna (capital), Smith and Tinker factory, Red Jinn's palace
- Characters: King Evoldo and his children, Princess Langwidere, Tik-Tok, Jinnicky the Red Jinn

The Land of Ev is a fictional country in the Oz books of L. Frank Baum and his successors. The country was first visited in Baum's third Oz novel, 1907's Ozma of Oz, and was the first of Baum's countries that surround the Land of Oz. This book introduced the Nome King, a recurring villain who lives underground beneath the Land of Ev.

== Development ==
In Oz and Beyond: The Fantasy World of L. Frank Baum, Michael O. Riley suggests that the creation of Ev was a compromise between the audience's interest in Oz, and Baum's reluctance to create a long-running series: "Baum was forced by external pressures to develop Oz (unlike Tolkien, whose Other-world grew naturally of its own accord in his mind), which made for a dilemma because Baum's imagination was more geared toward creating new imaginary countries than elaborating previously invented ones. In his book for 1907, Ozma of Oz, Baum attempted to satisfy both his readers and himself by combining his Oz characters with a story takes place outside Oz in a new fantasy country. By this device, he was able to construct a story and a background for it without having to take the "givens" of Oz into consideration; he was also largely able to avoid dealing with the confused state in which he had left that country in The Marvelous Land."

== Classic books ==
King Evoldo of Ev sold his unnamed Queen and their ten children, Princess Evanna, Prince Evardo, Princess Evedna, Princess Evella, Prince Evington, Princess Evirene, Prince Evring, Prince Evrob, Prince Evroland, and Princess Evrose, to Roquat, the Nome King, whose dominions are underneath Ev, in exchange for a long life. Evoldo regretted it and destroyed the life that King Roquat had provided him. Believing that Roquat had simply stolen the royal family, the Ozites entered the kingdom on a diplomatic mission to free them. When Roquat informs them of the fair deal, they play by his rules, and thanks to Billina, win back the family of Ev and the Nome King's Magic Belt.

During the time that the family was enslaved, Princess Langwidere, Evoldo's niece, took the throne as regent, but was too vain to do many administrative tasks, and spent most of her time admiring her 30 interchangeable heads. She had three wings of the palace demolished in order to direct visitors to the left wing, which is to one's right, but is the only wing left. She is relieved to give up the throne to her cousin, King Evardo, the eldest of Evoldo's children, so that she may be left to only admire her heads.

Also, in Evna is the factory of Smith and Tinker, who created Tik-Tok and the Giant with the Hammer, the latter to the specifications of King Roquat, the former a unique and prototypical gift to King Evoldo. Tik-Tok reports that Smith drowned in his own painting while Tinker built a ladder to the moon, so they are no longer in Evna. Later stories, such as Mr. Tinker in Oz and "Button-Bright and the Knit-Wits of Oz" from Oziana 1987, reveal them alive and well.

In most subsequent books, visits to Ev are primarily under Ev, and few of its inhabitants or towns are ever seen. Known unusual creatures consist only of the Wheelers who claim the Royal Family's Lunch Box Trees and Dinner Pail Trees and defend them through scaring travelers, though they are scrawny and have wheels made of keratin rather than hands or feet.

The Royal Family of Ev again appears in The Road to Oz, having changed but little from its initial disenchanted appearance. The family, without cousin Langwidere, are honored guests at Ozma's birthday party.

== In later books ==
Ruth Plumly Thompson made a major addition to Ev in the form of Jinnicky the Red Jinn, Wizard of Ev, who has a red glass palace nearer to the edge of the Land of Ix, which compasswise is either northeast or northwest. Sometimes Thompson implies that Jinnicky is the ruler of Ev, though she included a mention of Evardo briefly in The Wishing Horse of Oz that regarded him as a boy king, though if he is still a boy king at this point, Evoldo would have had no motivation for trading his family.

Thompson's The Hungry Tiger of Oz introduces Rash, a small principality within Ev ruled by Prince Evered, as well as Down Town and Immense City. The Wishing Horse of Oz introduces Bitty Bit, the Seer of Some Summit.

Jack Snow's The Shaggy Man of Oz includes a visit to the Valley of Romance in Ev, ruled by King Ticket and Queen Curtain, and the underground Kingdom of the Fairy Beavers.

In Out of Oz, the fourth and final volume of "The Wicked Years", Gregory Maguire's revisionist Oz series, Tip mentions that Mombey took him across the sands to "one of the duchy principalities, I think it was Ev" to visit "some second-rate duchess" who knew how to change the appearance of her head and body.

== Emerald City ==
The Land of Ev plays a major role in Emerald City. Tip and Jack escape there in the second episode and find a steampunk-style city. They have a trade relationship with the Land of Oz, and magic is banned there as it is in Oz. It is ruled by the King of Ev, who in a reversal of the books, lost his entire family to drowning. He has dementia and things someone can restore his dog, Randall, to life, although no magic user is depicted in the show as able to bring back the dead. He is accompanied by his daughter, Princess Langwidere, who is always masked. Dr. Jane Andrews, an American scientist, builds things for them, but is sacked when she refuses to replicate the police gun with which Dorothy Gale came to Oz. Jack kisses Tip when the magical potion wears off and turns him into a girl, and she is so shocked that she pushes him hard enough to knock him off a balcony. Jane rebuilds him out of tin, but most all he has left is his head and right arm. After the death of the King of Ev, Langwidere is crowned queen. She takes the Wizard's gold but refuses to deliver the guns, which others in Ev have built, which results in many of the guards being slain and a confrontation with the Wizard in her bedchamber.

== Location ==
The Land of Ev's exact location is unclear between text and maps. The Road to Oz states that Ev is to the north of the Land of Oz, and in Ozma of Oz, Princess Ozma of Oz and her procession enter the Munchkin Country and meet the King of the Munchkins upon leaving the palace at Evna, the capital city. In The Emerald City of Oz, Ev is stated to be directly to the east of Oz, but the book also says that Winkie Country is the nearest part of Oz to Ev, which would then imply it’s in the west. The map on the endpapers of Tik-Tok of Oz shows the Munchkin Country as having no northern border with the desert that surrounds Oz, as a thin strip of the Gillikin Country extends even farther east than most of the Munchkin Country. This map depicts Ev as a small country to the northwest (the compass rose is reversed) of Oz, with the Dominions of the Nome King as a separate area. James E. Haff and Dick Martin's map, following the text, place the Nome Kingdom under an Ev that takes up the entire portion allotted to the Nome King's dominions on Baum's map.

== Reception ==
A 2009 article in The Journal of Aesthetic Education, "Philosophical Adventures in the Lands of Oz and Ev", points out the philosophical questions raised by natural features in the Land of Ev, which call into question the differences between nature and man-made products: specifically, the lunchbox trees, the Wheelers and Tik-Tok.

== Points of interest ==
- Dooners:
- Down Town: A town that is located underneath the Land of Ev. It is described as much like the downtown places in the cities of the United States. The inhabitants of Down Town are obsessed with work and making money (even their clothes are made of money). Only the males are allowed on the streets of Down Town while the females stay at home. The Public Square of Down Town contains the Indus-Tree (a type of tree that grows all manners of tools for each profession).
- Cave Inn: A doorway that falls into the Nome Kingdom's Lost Labyrinth.
- Evna: Evna is the capital city of the Land of Ev.
- Field of Feathers:
- Fire Island: An island that is underneath the Land of Ev. It is inhabited by a race of Fire People (who are composed of red and blue flames) that use open fireplaces for houses. Anyone who wants to visit Fire Island must have a magic spell on them to protect them from the fires. The parts of the Nonestic Ocean that are close to Fire Island are always burning.
  - Blazes' Volcano: A volcano that belongs to Blazes.
- Immense City: A giant city in Ev that is near the Dominion of the Nome King. Everything here is giant size except for the humans who are normal size until they wear their Big Wigs (a type of wig that enables the wearer to grow to giant size). As a giant, Immense City is normal size for them. Travelers are often warned to stay away from Immense City.
- Jumping Off Place:
- Rash: A small pink kingdom in the southwest part of Ev. The inhabitants of Rash are good natured yet quick tempered. Rash is also home to a race of Speckled Bears.
- Rash River: A river that runs through Rash.
- Rubber Country:
- Some Summit:
- Squeedonia:
- Too Much Mountain: A mountain at the southern border of Rash at the Deadly Desert. Ippty had to fly over Too Much Mountain in order to reach the Land of Oz.
- Valley of Romance:
- Wheeler's Territory: An area where the Wheelers make their home.
- Zeron Mountain:

== Known inhabitants ==
- Bitty Bit: The Seer of Some Summit.
- Blazes: A Fire Man that is the owner of a volcano near Fire Island.
- Elma: Princess of the Big Wigs of Immense City.
- Evered ("Reddy"): Prince and current ruler of Rash.
- Evring: Youngest prince.
- Forge John: A blacksmith that is the leader of the Fire People of Fire Island.
- Irasha the Rough: Pasha and former usurper of Rash.
- Jinnicky the Red Jinn: The Wizard of Ev.
- King Evardo XV: Current ruler.
- King Evoldo: Former ruler.
- King Dad and Queen Fi Nance: The rulers of Down Town.
- King Ticket and Queen Curtain: The rulers of the Valley of Romance.
- Princess Langwidere: Former regent.
- Tik-Tok: He originally lived in Ev before emigrating to the Land of Oz.
- Wheelers: A race of people whose arms and legs are the same length and have wheels instead of hands and feet.
