= The Yellow Knight of Oz =

1930 book by Ruth Plumly Thompson

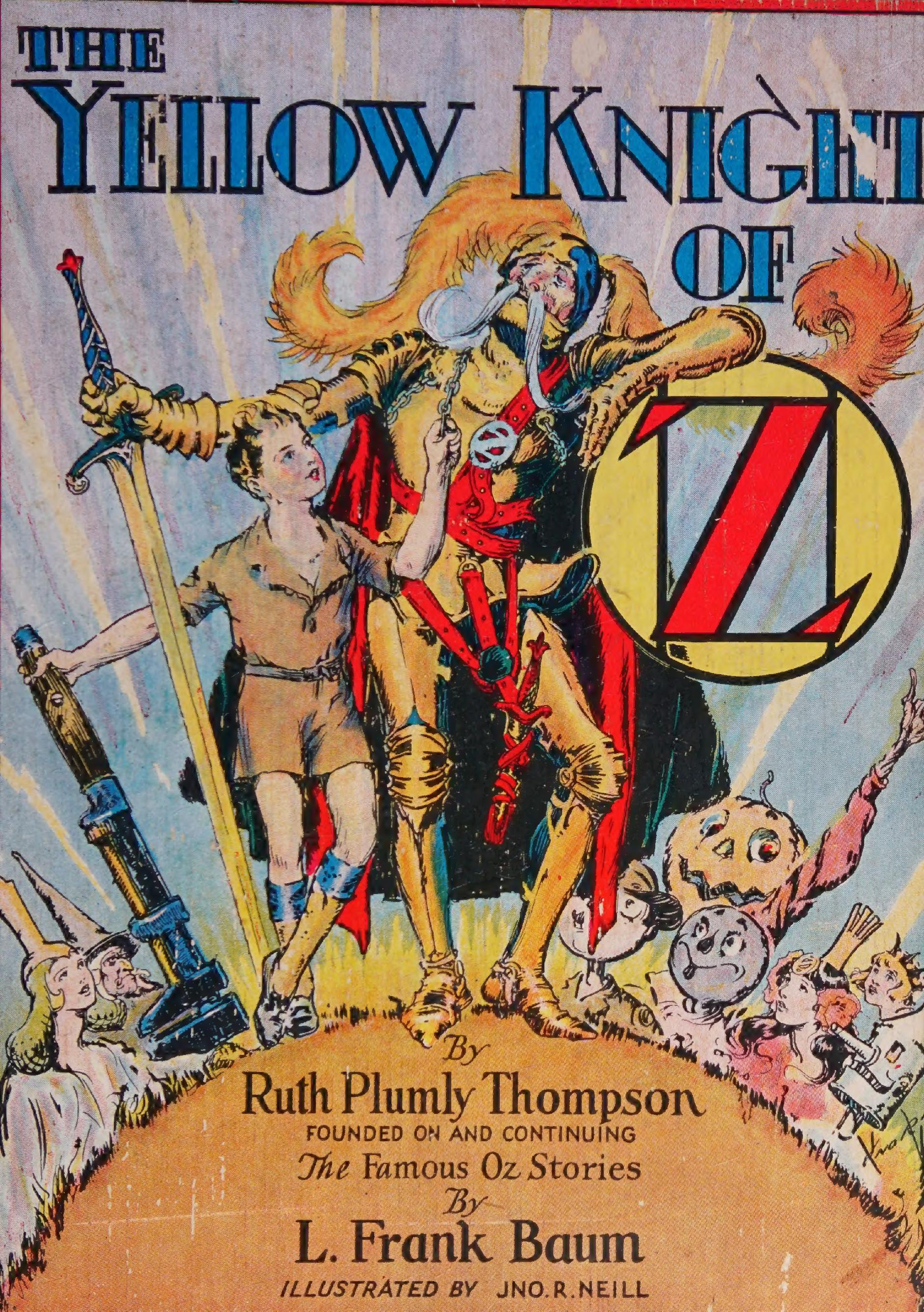
- Cover of The Yellow Knight of Oz
- Author: Ruth Plumly Thompson
- Illustrator: John R. Neill
- Language: English
- Series: The Oz books
- Genre: Fantasy
- Set in: Land of Oz
- Published: May 20, 1930 by Reilly & Lee
- Publication place: United States
- Media type: Print
- Pages: 275 pp
- OCLC: 2112060
- Preceded by: Jack Pumpkinhead of Oz
- Followed by: Pirates in Oz

The Yellow Knight of Oz (1930) is the twenty-fourth book in the Oz series created by L. Frank Baum and his successors, and the tenth written by Ruth Plumly Thompson. It was illustrated by John R. Neill. The novel was followed by Pirates in Oz (1931).

== Plot ==
Sir Hokus of Pokes grows tired of the Emerald City, and he and the Comfortable Camel set out for some adventure. Sir Hokes wants to rescue a damsel in distress, or at least find a monster to fight. Sir Hokus visits Marshland and befriends Ploppa, a giant mud turtle. Ploppa would like to accompany Sir Hokus on his adventures, but cannot leave the swamp. Sir Hokus is joined by the Comfortable Camel.

Meanwhile, a boy named Speedy blasts his way to Oz in a homemade rocket ship, where he finds himself in the underground kingdom of Subterranea. At his touch, a golden statue of a beautiful girl comes to life. She is called Marygolden, and she accompanies Speedy on his further adventures. Sir Hokes and Speedy join forces and, using the power of a bag of magic dates, they counter the magic of the evil Sultan of Samandra and restore the Corumbian Kingdom, which the Sultan had conquered and enchanted. Sir Hokus learns his true identity: he is actually the young and handsome Yellow Knight of Corumbia, transformed into old, absent-minded Sir Hokus by the Sultan's magic. Using the power of the magic dates, Sir Hokus regains his youthful form and vacates the Emerald City to rule as Prince of Corumbia, with Marygolden becoming his Princess.

== Adaptation ==
L. Frank Baum adapted many of his Oz stories for stage and film versions, but The Yellow Knight of Oz is the only one of Thompson's Oz books that was adapted for the stage. In 1962, Sacramento theater manager Richard Fullmer obtained permission from Thompson, publisher Reilly & Lee, and the Baum estate to adapt the book. (Fullmer had previously produced his own adaptation of Baum's original Wizard of Oz.) Fullmer's version was premiered at the Sacramento Civic Theater in February 1963; it blended live actors with puppets for non-human characters like the Comfortable Camel.

Fullmer's adaptation was later revised by Christopher Sterling. This version was regularly acted at the annual conventions of the International Wizard of Oz Club.

== Continuity ==
In A Brief Guide to Oz, Paul Simpson notes that this story presents a different origin for Sir Hokus than in The Royal Book of Oz, where he was implied to be an immigrant to Oz from old Britain: "In Thompson's introductory tale for him, he is an Arthurian knight (and indeed most of this story plays into that background), but we learn at the end that he is a native-born Ozite."

Reportedly, Thompson came to regret ending Hokus' character arc this way. In John R. Neill's Oz books written in the early 1940s, Hokus is back to his original self, with no mention of Corum the Yellow Knight.

== Similar works ==
The final "canonical" Oz book, Eloise and Lauren McGraw's Merry Go Round in Oz, similarly used Arthurian imagery as the basis of the minor Ozian kingdom which is the story's main focus.

== Copyright status ==
The Yellow Knight of Oz and all its characters entered the US public domain on January 1, 2026.

The Oz books
Previous book: Jack Pumpkinhead of Oz	The Yellow Knight of Oz; 1930	Next book: Pirates in Oz
