= Pirates in Oz =

1931 book by Ruth Plumly Thompson

- Cover of Pirates in Oz.
- Author: Ruth Plumly Thompson
- Illustrator: John R. Neill
- Language: English
- Series: The Oz Books
- Genre: Children's novel
- Publisher: Reilly & Lee
- Publication date: May 1931
- Publication place: United States
- Media type: Print (hardcover)
- Preceded by: The Yellow Knight of Oz
- Followed by: The Purple Prince of Oz

Pirates in Oz (1931) is the twenty-fifth book in the Oz series created by L. Frank Baum and his successors, and the eleventh written by Ruth Plumly Thompson. It was illustrated by John R. Neill. The novel was followed by The Purple Prince of Oz (1932).

== Plot ==
Peter returns for a third time, washing up on the Octagon Isle after a shipwreck. He joins King Ato of the Octagon Isle, who has been abandoned by his subjects, and Captain Samuel Salt, who has been abandoned by his crew of pirates. Together, they sail on the Nonestic Ocean (which surrounds the continent which includes Oz and its neighbor countries).

Meanwhile, Ruggedo, the deposed Gnome King, is back. He had been cursed with loss of speech by a magical "Silence Stone" at the end of his previous appearance in The Gnome King of Oz, and is scraping out a living as a peddler and beggar. He decides to answer an advertisement for the position of King of the Land of Menankypoo, whose people are also mute. These people demand "a dumb king" and Ruggedo meets this requirement. While serving as king, he recovers his ability to speak, joins forces with an ambitious magician, and also becomes leader of Captain Salt's mutinous pirates and Ato's rebellious subjects. He trains these followers into a military force, and attempts once again to conquer Oz.

This is one of the few Oz books in which Ruggedo appears as a sympathetic character. The reader faces danger, overcomes obstacles, and experiences gratifying moments of triumph with him. Of the two narrative threads in the book, his is the more complex and suspenseful. (The other is Peter and Captain Salt and King Ato sailing around the Nonestic Ocean, visiting small islands.)

Besides Captain Salt, this book introduces two notable characters: Clocker, a clockwork man who is not as trustworthy as Tik-Tok, and Pigasus, a flying pig whose riders are magically compelled to speak in rhyming jingles. Pigasus returns as a principal character in 1935's The Wishing Horse of Oz while Captain Salt and King Ato return in 1936's Captain Salt in Oz.

== Reception ==
The Nashville Banner said, "This is one of the very best of the Oz books."

The Oz books
Previous book: The Yellow Knight of Oz	Pirates in Oz; 1931	Next book: The Purple Prince of Oz
