= Captain Salt in Oz =

1936 book by Ruth Plumly Thompson

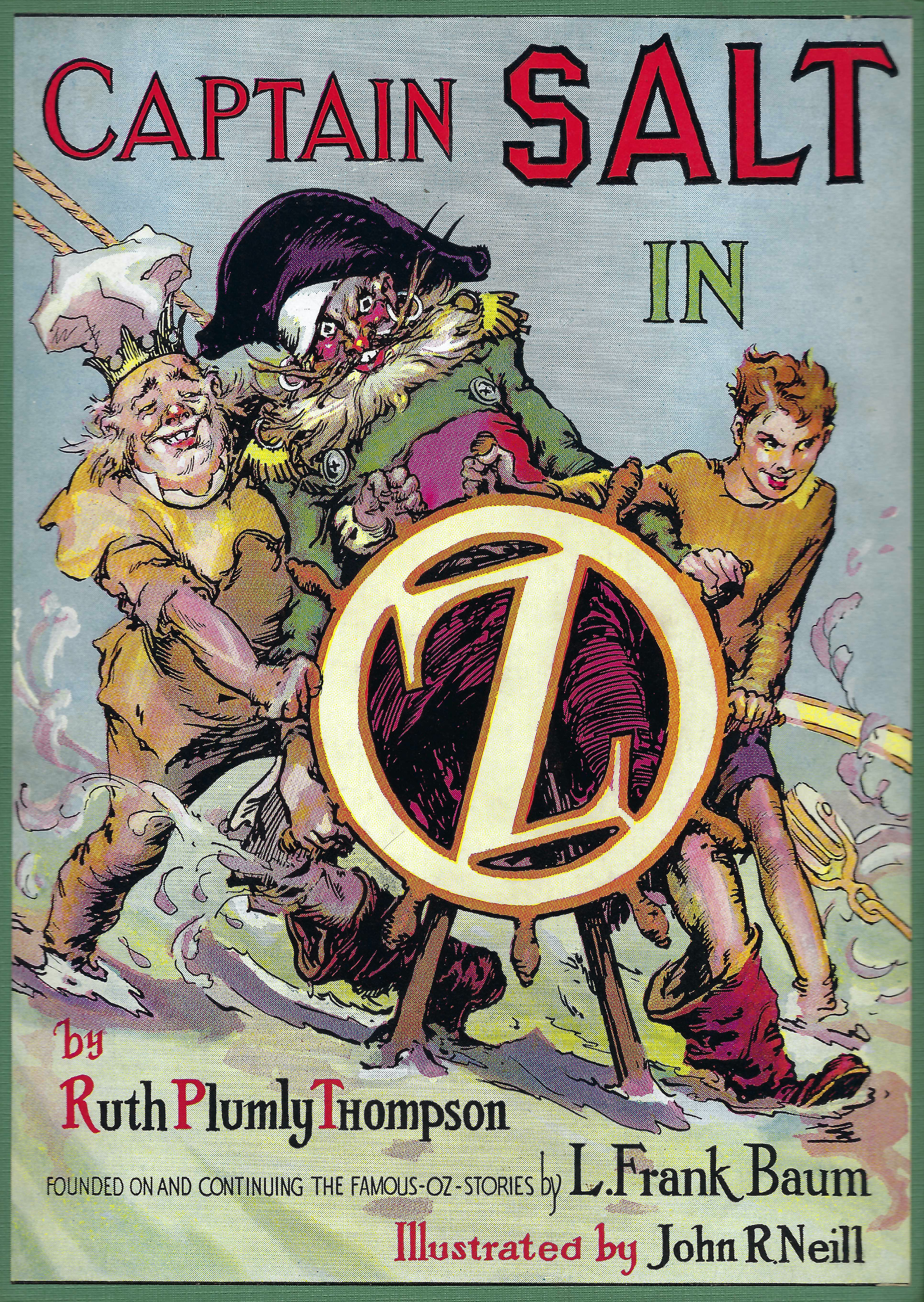
- Cover of Captain Salt in Oz.
- Author: Ruth Plumly Thompson
- Illustrator: John R. Neill
- Language: English
- Series: The Oz Books
- Genre: Children's novel
- Publisher: Reilly & Lee
- Publication date: 1936
- Publication place: United States
- Media type: Print (Hardcover)
- Pages: 306
- Preceded by: The Wishing Horse of Oz
- Followed by: Handy Mandy in Oz

Captain Salt in Oz (1936) is the thirtieth book in the Oz series created by L. Frank Baum and his successors, and the sixteenth written by Ruth Plumly Thompson. It was illustrated by John R. Neill. The novel was followed by Handy Mandy in Oz (1937).

Captain Samuel Salt (from 1931's Pirates in Oz) sails the Nonestic Ocean and discovers Ozamaland, a legendary land of flying animals, as well as the famous White City of Om, and other places.

Captain Salt in Oz is a rare Oz novel whose plotline takes place entirely outside the land of Oz and deals only indirectly with its inhabitants. (Compare with Baum's Rinkitink in Oz, another volume in the series with a limited connection to Oz.) Salt goes from island to island, claiming them in Princess Ozma's name.

Captain Salt in Oz was the first Oz book to be published without any color illustrations since The Road to Oz in 1909. Reilly & Lee would continue to publish all remaining Oz titles without color illustrations, eventually including reprints of earlier Baum and Thompson titles.

== Reception ==
The Atlanta Constitution opined that "this particular book will appeal to boys more readily than girls as it has a very high spirit of adventure among strange people, in a still stranger land... The book throughout is interestingly illustrated with over a hundred sketches which will delight the heart of every boy of an adventurous spirit." The Spokane Chronicle agreed that "Ruth Plumly Thompson comes through with the same high caliber writing for children exemplified by L. Frank Baum".

The Oz books
Previous book: The Wishing Horse of Oz	Captain Salt in Oz; 1936	Next book: Handy Mandy in Oz
