= Wizard of Oz (character) =

Character from The Wonderful Wizard of Oz

Oscar Diggs/The Wizard of Oz
- Oz character
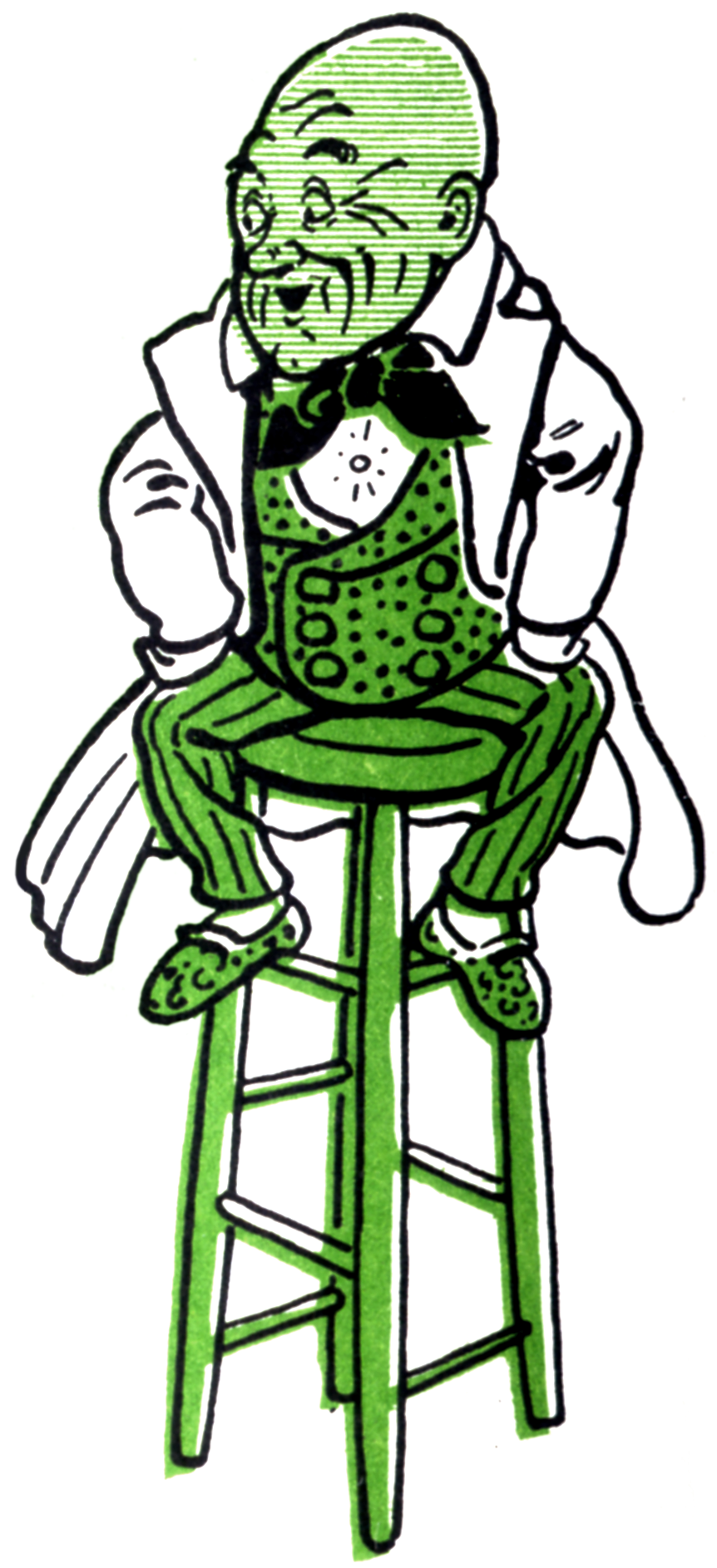
- The Wizard as illustrated by William Wallace Denslow (1900)
- First appearance: The Wonderful Wizard of Oz (1900)
- Created by: Frank Baum

In-universe information
- Title: The Wizard of Oz
- Occupation: Advisor and court magician to Princess Ozma
- Family: A prominent Omaha politician and his wife (parents)
- Children: Elphaba Thropp (daughter, Wicked continuity)
- Nationality: American

Oscar Zoroaster Phadrig Isaac Norman Henkle Emmannuel Ambroise Diggs, better known as the "Wizard of Oz," is a fictional character in the Land of Oz created by American author L. Frank Baum. He debuted in Baum's 1900 book The Wonderful Wizard of Oz, and was further popularized by a stage play and several films, including the 1939 MGM musical film.

In his first appearance in The Wonderful Wizard of Oz, the Wizard rules the Land of Oz from his palace in the Emerald City. He is exposed at the end of the novel as a conman and circus magician, but in further books of the series, he becomes a trusted and valued friend to the Oz characters.

== Oz books ==
The Wizard is the eponymous character of the 1900 novel The Wonderful Wizard of Oz. Unseen for most of the book, he is the ruler of the Land of Oz and highly venerated by his subjects. Believing he is the only man capable of solving their problems, Dorothy and her friends travel to the Emerald City, the capital of Oz, to meet him. Oz is very reluctant to meet them, but eventually each is granted an audience, one by one each day.

In each of these occasions, the Wizard appears in a different form:

- Before Dorothy, he was a giant head.
- Before the Scarecrow, he was a beautiful lady dressed in green silk gauze and wore a green crown of jewels on her flowing green locks.
- Before the Tin Woodman, he was a thick woolly-haired horrible elephant-sized beast that is described to have the head of a five-eyed rhinoceros, five long arms, and five long slim legs.
- Before the Cowardly Lion, he was a ball of fire.

When, at last, he grants an audience to all of them at once, he seems to be a disembodied voice.

Eventually, it is revealed that Oz is actually none of these things, but rather an ordinary conman from Omaha, Nebraska, who has been using elaborate magic tricks and props to make himself seem "great and powerful". Working as a magician for a circus, he wrote OZ (the initials of his first two forenames, Oscar being his first, and Zoroaster being the first of his seven middle names) on the side of his hot air balloon for promotional purposes. One day his balloon sailed into the Land of Oz and he found himself worshipped as a great sorcerer. As Oz had no leadership at the time, he became Supreme Ruler of the kingdom and did his best to sustain the myth.

Once exposed, he reveals that he has never had any real magic power at all and so lived in constant fear of the Wicked Witches of the East and West. When he heard that a girl capable of killing witches had appeared in the land, the cowardly "wizard" was willing to promise anything in order to manipulate her into disposing of the Wicked Witch of the West but admits that he cannot keep his promises.

He leaves Oz at the end of the novel, again in a hot air balloon. After the Wizard's departure, the Scarecrow is briefly enthroned, until Princess Ozma (the rightful hereditary ruler of Oz) is freed from the witch Mombi at the end of The Marvelous Land of Oz.

In The Marvelous Land of Oz, the Wizard is described as having usurped the throne of King Pastoria and handed over the baby princess to Mombi. This did not please the readers, and in Ozma of Oz, although the character did not appear, Baum described Ozma's abduction without including the Wizard as part of it.

The Wizard returns in the novel Dorothy and the Wizard in Oz. With Dorothy and the boy Zeb, he falls through a crack in the earth; in their underground journey, he acts as their guide and protector. Oz explains that his real name is Oscar Zoroaster Phadrig Isaac Norman Henkle Emmannuel Ambroise Diggs. To shorten this name, he used only the initials of his first name and his first middle name "O.Z.", since the initials of his other middle names spell out the word pinhead which he didn't want to use. When Ozma rescues them from the underground kingdoms, he recounts his story of becoming the ruler of Oz, and Ozma explains that before the witches usurped her grandfather's throne (an occurrence happening long before the wizard arrived), the ruler of Oz had always been known as Oz or (if female) Ozma. Ozma then permits him to live in Oz permanently. He becomes an apprentice to Glinda (the most powerful magic-worker in Oz). Ozma decrees that, besides herself, only The Wizard and Glinda are allowed to use magic unless the other magic users have permits.

In later books, he proves himself quite an inventor, providing devices that aid in various characters’ journeys. Some of his most elaborate devices are the balloon-powered Ozoplanes in Ozoplaning with the Wizard of Oz, and intelligent taxis called Scalawagons in The Scalawagons of Oz.

=== Possible inspiration ===
In The Annotated Wizard of Oz, Michael Patrick Hearn suggests that L. Frank Baum may have derived elements of the character and backstory of the Wizard from Washington Harrison Donaldson, a balloonist, ventriloquist and stage magician who worked for P. T. Barnum. On 15 July 1875, Donaldson made an ascent near Chicago and disappeared in a storm; neither he nor his balloon was ever seen again.

The Wizard is also said to have been partly inspired by inventor Thomas Edison, whom author L. Frank Baum referred to as "The Wizard". A contemporary nickname for Edison was "The Wizard of Menlo Park".

== Adaptations ==
=== Silent films (1908–1925) ===
The Wizard appeared in nearly every silent Oz film, portrayed by different actors each time.

- The Fairylogue and Radio-Plays (1908): Sam 'Smiling' Jones
- The Wonderful Wizard of Oz (1910): Hobart Bosworth
- The Patchwork Girl of Oz (1914): Todd Wright
- His Majesty, the Scarecrow of Oz (1914): J. Charles Haydon
- Wizard of Oz (1925): Charles Murray

=== The Wizard of Oz (1939) ===
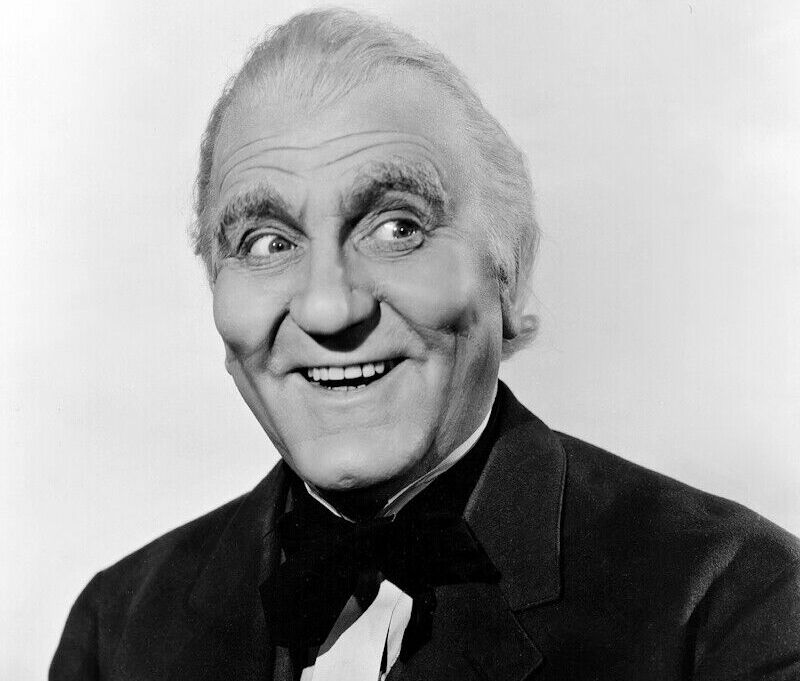
Morgan as the title character in the MGM feature film The Wizard of Oz, 1939 film.

In The Wizard of Oz, the Wizard's character is similar to that found in the earlier books; a bumbling "humbug". He was played by actor Frank Morgan who also played several other roles in the movie including Professor Marvel (the mysterious traveling fortune-teller who Dorothy meets in Kansas with a horse named Sylvester), the Doorman at the Emerald City, the Guard at the Gates to the Wizard's Castle, and the Coachman whose transport is drawn by "The Horse of a Different Color". His face was also presumably used as the projected image of the Wizard. Like Dorothy, the Wizard himself hails from Kansas, proudly stating that he is "an old Kansas man myself, born and bred in the heart of the Western Wilderness". However, the balloon says "Omaha State Fair" on it and Omaha is in Nebraska, not Kansas, reflecting that the Wizard may have originated from Omaha, Nebraska, just as in the book. In the film, the Wizard is seen only as a floating head and as a human, not in any of the other shapes that he appears in the book.

Screenwriters Florence Ryerson and Edgar Allan Woolf created Professor Marvel for the Kansas sepia tone sequences.

=== Oz the Great and Powerful (2013) ===
Oz the Great and Powerful serves as an unofficial prequel to the Oz series. The film centers on Oscar Diggs (portrayed by James Franco) and follows his journey from small-time magician to the ruler of the Land of Oz. In it, he is portrayed as an overly flirtatious and overconfident con artist and stage magician who upon meeting Theodora (the future Wicked Witch of the West) and inadvertently sparking her obsession with him, is keen on fulfilling his role as the legendary Wizard destined to restore order to Oz (primarily due to the promise of the Oz Treasury). However, throughout his journey and seeing the impact of his actions both good and bad, he comes to realize how much the people of Oz need him and devises a way to use his skill in illusions to free them, using his balloon to create the idea that he has been physically killed while hiding in a caravan so that he can use smoke and a makeshift cinema to project the illusion of his face, subsequently claiming that his "death" has simply allowed him to shed his mortal form. He also forms a makeshift "family" in the form of himself, Glinda the Good Witch, Finley (a winged monkey he rescued from a lion) and the China Girl (a living glass china doll and the sole survivor of an attack on China Town whose legs he repaired with glue).

=== Once Upon a Time (2014) ===
Walsh
- Once Upon a Time character
- First appearance: "New York City Serenade" (3.12)
- Last appearance: "Kansas" (3.20)
- Created by: Edward Kitsis
- Portrayed by: Christopher Gorham

In-universe information
- Aliases: The Wizard of Oz; Oz the Great and Terrible; Flying Monkey
- Occupation: Circus huckster (formerly); Furniture shop owner (formerly)

The Wizard of Oz appears in the Once Upon a Time episodes "New York City Serenade", "A Curious Thing" and "Kansas" portrayed by Christopher Gorham.

Originally, Walsh is from Kansas, but finds himself in the Land of Oz. Giving himself the name "Oz the Great and Terrible", he masquerades as an all-knowing wizard. This hoax upsets Glinda the Witch of the South, as she knows he only gives false hope to those who seek out his help. From behind a curtain, Walsh projects a shadow image and speaks with a booming voice to anyone who approaches his palace to seek an audience with him. He also asks for genuine magical items in exchange for help which he uses to further his deception. A woman named Zelena wants his help in finding her birth family, so he gifts a pair of silver heels to take her anywhere she desires. Zelena leaves for the Enchanted Forest to seek out family, and she returns asking to go to the past so that she can change her own fate of being abandoned by her mother. The wizard states that, even with the most powerful magic, this is not possible. Angrily, she rips off the curtain and discovers his true persona is nothing but a simple man who likes orchestrating a false image to put on a good show. Deciding to make use of him, she turns Walsh into a flying monkey as her loyal pet. Sometime later, his transformation into a flying monkey alerts Glinda to Zelena's presence. Glinda thanks Zelena for exposing him and believes time as her pet is fitting punishment for his trickery. Zelena is welcomed into Glinda's sisterhood of witches as the Witch of the West, but is "defeated" by a young girl named Dorothy Gale. Rather than become the new Witch of the West, Dorothy only wishes to go home; a desire Glinda grants by taking her back to see the Wizard, who is presumed to have reverted to his old form, since Zelena's magic has been undone. From behind the green curtain, Zelena impersonates the Wizard's voice and gives Dorothy the silver slippers to send her home.

Walsh meets Emma Swan and they begin dating. Over the course of eight months, he gets to know her as well as her son, Henry. Walsh has dishonest motives in getting close to Emma, but the nature of it is not known. During one romantic evening dinner, Walsh surprises Emma by hiding a ring on the platter of an ice cream sundae and then proposes to her. She reacts in shock by walking out of the restaurant and stating that marriage is too soon for them. Walsh agrees to be patient, as she is the one he wants to spend his life with, and promises to give her all the time to think it over. The next day, he receives a text from Henry asking him to come over to the apartment to have dinner with Emma. Walsh promptly shows up, to which Emma leads him onto the rooftop where she rejects his marriage proposal. Emma reluctantly explains the necessity for herself to go home and leave him behind because "a ghost" from her past has shown up. Walsh does his best to convince her that the life she has now is worth staying for, but Emma cannot, though she wishes it could be so. Unable to sway her otherwise, Walsh's demeanor changes and he expresses knowledge of the potion Emma previously drank, which is what restored her memories. After throwing aside a table, he charges at her, but she dodges, sending him hurling down the roof. He soars up in the form of Flying Monkey to attack her, though Emma violently shoves him away with a metal pipe. Physically wounded, he falls from the building, nearly hitting the ground, before disappearing in a puff of smoke.

=== Emerald City (2017) ===
Frank Morgan
- Emerald City character
- First appearance: "The Beast Forever" (1.1)
- Last appearance: "No Place Like Home" (1.10)
- Created by: Matthew Arnold; Josh Friedman
- Portrayed by: Vincent D'Onofrio

In-universe information
- Alias: The Wizard of Oz
- Gender: Male
- Occupation: Ruler of Oz

The Wizard of Oz appears in the Emerald City series, portrayed by Vincent D'Onofrio. He is the ruler of Emerald City and, effectively, Oz, and as such has banished magic from the land. His real name is revealed to be Frank Morgan. Having travelled to Oz through an early experiment, he remained there as he felt that he could be a greater success in Oz than he was in Kansas. Despite establishing his authority over Oz and banishing magic, he attempts to use the witches to maintain his authority over areas such as a mystical prison. He seeks to prove his superiority over magic by vanquishing the Beast Forever through duplicating Dorothy's gun after she uses it to trick the Witch of the East into killing herself, but he is undermined by Dorothy's own refusal to go along with his orders. Although he is able to mass-produce more guns to use against the witches, proclaiming them to be the Beast Forever in an attempted propaganda coup, his plans fail as it is revealed that only witches can kill witches, the series ending with the assembled witches confronting the Wizard as the Beast Forever approaches Oz.

=== Other adaptations ===
- In the 1902 musical extravaganza, The Wizard was portrayed by a series of "ethnic" comedians.
- The extended network television version of the animated feature Journey Back to Oz (1964/1972) contains live-action segments with Bill Cosby as The Wizard (a character otherwise not seen in the original theatrical version) trying to bring two children back to Kansas for Christmas.
- The Wizard of Oz appears in Off to See the Wizard, voiced by Daws Butler. He serves as the host of the show where he presents the movie of the episode.
- In the musical The Wiz, the titular "Wiz" was originally portrayed on Broadway by Andre De Shields. This version is a balloonist from Omaha named Herman Smith who traveled to Oz by accident when his hot air balloon drifted off course.
  - In the 1978 film adaptation, the Wiz was portrayed by Richard Pryor. This adaption of Herman Smith is a failed politician from Atlantic City, New Jersey who was transported to Oz when a balloon he was flying to promote his campaign to become the city dogcatcher was lost in a storm.
  - In the 2015 television special The Wiz Live!, a female version of the Wiz is portrayed by Queen Latifah.
- In the 1980 television special Thanksgiving in the Land of Oz, the Wizard is voiced by Sid Caesar.
- In Gregory Maguire's 1995 revisionist novel Wicked and the novel's 2003 musical theatre adaptation, the Wizard is a dictator who uses deceit and trickery to hide his own shortcomings. It is also revealed in the musical and movie, and implied in the book, that the Wizard is the biological father of Elphaba, the Wicked Witch of the West. Joel Grey portrayed the Wizard in the original Broadway production; he'd previously performed the same role in the 1995 benefit concert The Wizard of Oz in Concert: Dreams Come True.
  - Jeff Goldblum portrays the Wizard in the two-part film adaptation of the musical, Wicked (2024) and Wicked: For Good (2025).
- Caliber Comics' Oz comic book series, followed by Arrow Comics' Dark Oz and The Land of Oz featured the Wizard, affectionately known as "Oscar", particularly to Ozma, as a tall, bald, mustachioed man, brooding, powerful, and not at all bumbling.
- The Wizard is featured in the 1990 The Wizard of Oz animated series, voiced by Alan Oppenheimer.
- In the animated series The Oz Kids (1996), he has a son named Frank. He is voiced by Steve Stoliar.
- In The Muppets' Wizard of Oz (2005), the Wizard of Oz is portrayed by Jeffrey Tambor. This version is a former tour bus driver named Francis Cornfine from Hollywood, CA who came to the Land of Oz where the residents assumed he was an all-powerful figure. Cornfine's talent at manipulating his fingers impressed the populace. Feeling a need to "give the public what they want", he developed a number of devices and tricks to maintain the illusion of "Oz, the great and powerful". Using special effects, he appeared as a dragon to the Lion (Fozzie Bear), a flaming entity to the Scarecrow (Kermit the Frog), a hot woman turning into a hen to Tin Thing (Gonzo the Great), and a big green monstrous head to Dorothy (Ashanti) and Toto (Pepe the King Prawn).
- In the 2007 Sci Fi television miniseries Tin Man, a character called the "Mystic Man" (played by Richard Dreyfuss) is one of the former rulers of Central City, the capital of the Outer Zone (O.Z.), and like his counterpart from the book, uses technology to make himself seem more impressive. He is also referred to as "the wizard" and styles himself similarly to the Wizard of Oz, but has been relegated to the main performer of a Central City magic show rather than the "humbug" overlord of the Emerald City.
- In the VeggieTales episode The Wonderful Wizard of Ha's, the Wizard is portrayed by Archibald Asparagus as the "Wonderful Land of Ha's" amusement park owner who later reveals himself as a promotional showman to Darby (Junior Asparagus).
- In June 2008, the Japanese video game publisher D3 Publisher announced The Wizard of Oz: Beyond the Yellow Brick Road, a new video game adaptation of The Wizard of Oz, developed for the Nintendo DS handheld video game console. The game was developed by Media.Vision and shows a Japanese anime style for the graphics. "Riz-Zoawd" (the game's name in Japan) is actually the anagram for "Wizard Oz". The game was published in Japan in late 2008 and North America in 2009 by Xseed Games.
- The Wizard of Oz appears in Dorothy and the Witches of Oz, portrayed by Christopher Lloyd. When the Emerald City is attacked by the Wicked Witch of the West's forces who are after the Book of Mini Airu which contains the Changing Word, the Wizard of Oz holds a ceasefire where he will give the Book of Mini Airu to her in exchange that the Wicked Witch and her allies don't attack, bother, or annoy the Emerald City, the Munchkin Country, and the territories west of Winkie Country. This leads to a pinky swear where the Wizard of Oz is forbidden to try and fetch it back. When it was discovered that the Wizard of Oz entrusted the key to the Book of Mini Airu to Dorothy, this leads the Wicked Witch of the West to invade Earth years later to get her to give it up. When the Wicked Witch of the West gets the key, a holographic message is played by the Wizard of Oz who reveals some of his backstory and states that the key is a fake which thwarts the Wicked Witch of the West's plans to take over the worlds. By the end of the movie, Dorothy and Nick Chopper see someone that resembles the Wizard playing "Somewhere Over the Rainbow" on the saxophone.
- In the 2011 direct-to-DVD animated film Tom and Jerry and the Wizard of Oz, the Wizard is voiced by Joe Alaskey.
- In the Dorothy Must Die series by Danielle Paige that details an alternate version of the stories, after Dorothy and her friends have been corrupted by the magic of Oz and the wizard's gifts, it is revealed that the Wizard has returned to Oz, acting as a 'neutral' party in the conflict between Dorothy's forces and the Order of the Wicked that acts against her, allowing him to live in the Emerald City while passing on some information to the Order of the Wicked. After he tells new protagonist Amy Gumm about how she might defeat Dorothy, she is able to take the Tin Woodman's heart and the Cowardly Lion's courage - 'manifested' as his tail - but when she next confronts the Wizard, he has taken the Scarecrow's brains. His true agenda is revealed to be a complex plan to bring Kansas and Oz together, having concluded that the two countries are essentially the same place across two different dimensions, requiring the gifts he gave Dorothy's companions as they represent a blend of the magics of Oz and Kansas (Kansas having been deprived of magic by Oz's existence). He attempts to use Dorothy as the final sacrifice for this spell, but she is able to disrupt the spell so that the Wizard is destroyed instead, creating a temporary portal that send the Order of the Wicked and Amy back to Kansas until they can find Dorothy's silver shoes.
- The Wizard of Oz appears in the Supernatural season 10 episode "There's No Place Like Home", portrayed by Carter Kinsella. In this show, he was originally Man of Letters member Clive Dylan who got sent into the Land of Oz and split himself. L. Frank Baum was able to rescue Clive who then retired at the cost of Baum's daughter Dorothy being left behind. Sometime after the Wicked Witch's death, Charlie Bradbury reveals she made a deal with the Wizard to split herself into her good and dark sides using the Inner Key of Oz in order to win a rebellion to free Oz from evil. The Wizard of Oz turned out to be the personification of Clive Dylan's dark side who wanted to rule the Land of Oz. Years later, Sam Winchester and Good Charlie track down the good side of the elderly Clive Dylan (portrayed by Duncan Fraser) who is using the alias of Michael Carter. To draw out the Wizard of Oz, Charlie wounded Clive. The Wizard of Oz appeared to confront Clive as he used his magic to restrain Sam. Despite Dean Winchester beating up Dark Charlie, Good Charlie was goaded by Clive to kill him. Once Good Charlie shot Clive in the face, the Wizard of Oz fell dead as Sam uses his Inner Key of Oz to merge both Charlies back into one body.
- The Wizard of Oz appears in Dorothy and the Wizard of Oz, voiced by Tom Kenny. He appears in "The Wizard, The Witch, and The Crystal Ball" where another tornado brings his balloon back to the Land of Oz where he plans to become an actual wizard. When he finds out about the Wicked Witch of the West's spirit being trapped in her crystal ball, he decides to help resurrect her in exchange for powers (not knowing that it takes years to get powers), but it backfired and Dorothy accidentally resurrects the Wicked Witch without her powers.
- The Wizard of Oz appears in the play The Wonderful Winter of Oz, portrayed by Kermit the Frog.

== Cultural references ==
- The season 3 episode of the serial drama Lost titled "The Man Behind the Curtain" is a reference to the Wizard of Oz. His name is also mentioned in the dialogue of the show, with John Locke comparing Ben Linus to the Wizard and saying that he is the one orchestrating events and is "The Man Behind the Curtain".
- In the episode "It's Christmas in Canada" of the television series South Park, the main characters visit the new Prime Minister of Canada, who takes the shape of a floating head. This turns out to be a projection operated by Saddam Hussein, who was hiding in a hole in the wall.
- An entire episode of Scrubs, "My Way Home", pays homage to The Wizard of Oz.
- The television show Futurama aired "Anthology of Interest II" which parodied the 1939 movie version of the story where Professor Hubert Farnsworth played the wizard and appearing as a giant-headed version of himself standing behind a curtain.
- The Wizard is parodied in the form of "Mr. Magic" in the SpongeBob SquarePants season 4 episode "Hocus Pocus". Mr. Magic appears to SpongeBob and Patrick as a giant floating head, but in reality the head is just an illusion controlled by a man with a machine concealed behind a curtain.
- The Wizard of Oz appears in the Robot Chicken episode "Two Weeks Without Food", voiced by Breckin Meyer.
- The Wizard of Oz is the titular subject of the Spock's Beard song, "The Man Behind the Curtain" from their 2010 album, X.
- The Fall Out Boy song "Alpha Dog" features the lyric "I can almost see the wizard through the curtains" - meaning he can see through the deception of something.
- In the anime-inspired 3D web series RWBY, the character of "Headmaster Ozpin" alludes to the Wizard of Oz. This is further expanded on with the character "Oscar", Ozpin's next incarnation, and Ozpin's original name being revealed as Ozma. In fact, Ozpin's name is even derived from the fact that the initials of the wizard's full name spells out "ozpinhead".
- In the video game Gex 3: Deep Cover Gecko, a boss level parodies The Wizard of Oz. The main character is dressed as the Tin Man and fights a holographic projected head known as the Brain of Oz.
- The Wizard of Oz makes a brief appearance in the crossover video game Lego Dimensions as the "In Peril" character for the first level of the story mode "Follow the LEGO Brick Road". He also appears as a Gold Brick puzzle in The Wizard of Oz World if you collect all ten Minikits in "Follow the LEGO Brick Road" where he flies in his hot air balloon and you need to stop the Winged Monkeys from destroying the balloon so he can make it to Emerald City.
- In the Indigo Girls song, "You and Me of the 10,000 Wars", Verse 4 includes the line "Watch the Wizard behind the curtain".
- The Wizard of Oz appears in the Teen Titans Go! episode "Warner Bros. 100th Anniversary", voiced by Eric Bauza.
- In the video game Library of Ruina, Abnormalities of the Floor of Social Sciences share traits of being based on characters from The Wonderful Wizard of Oz. The final Abnormality of Chesed's Floor is based on the Wizard of Oz and named the Adult Who Tells Lies.

== See also ==
- List of Oz books

Preceded by Pastoria	Monarch of Oz	Succeeded by The Scarecrow
