= Ruth Plumly Thompson =

American author of children's books (1891–1976)

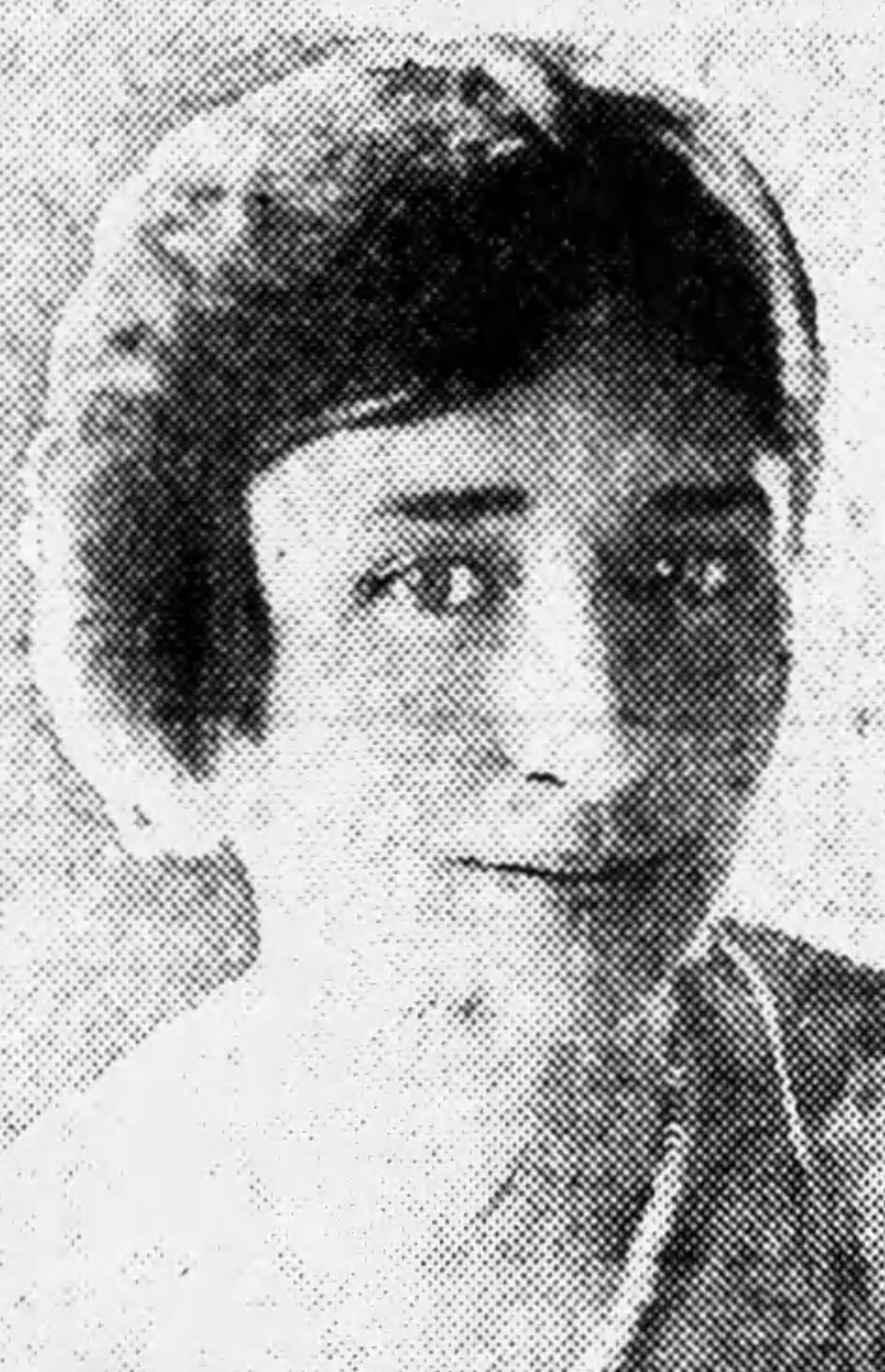
- Thompson c. 1933
- Born: 27 July 1891; Philadelphia, Pennsylvania
- Died: 6 April 1976 (aged 84)
- Occupation: Writer
- Genre: Children's literature
- Notable works: Oz books

Ruth Plumly Thompson (27 July 1891 – 6 April 1976) was an American writer of children's stories, best known for writing many novels placed in Oz, the fictional land of L. Frank Baum's classic children's novel The Wonderful Wizard of Oz and its sequels.

== Life and work ==
An avid reader of Baum's books and a lifelong children's writer, Thompson was born in Philadelphia, Pennsylvania. While in high school she sold her first fairy tale to St. Nicholas Magazine to which she continued contributing, along with The Smart Set. In 1914 she took a job with the Philadelphia Public Ledger, writing a weekly children's column for the newspaper. She had already published her first children's book, The Perhappsy Chaps, and her second, The Princess of Cozytown, was pending publication when William Lee, vice president of Baum's publisher Reilly & Lee, solicited Thompson to continue the Oz series. (Rumors among fans that Thompson was Baum's niece were untrue.)

=== Writing Oz ===
Her first Oz book, 1921's The Royal Book of Oz, concerned the Scarecrow's discovery that he was once the Emperor of the Silver Isles. To smooth the transition between Baum's books and Thompson's, Reilly & Lee published the book under Baum's name and claimed that the book was written from Baum's notes, although this has been disproven.

Between 1921 and 1939, Thompson wrote one Oz book a year. (Since Thompson was the primary supporter of her widowed mother and disabled sister, the annual income from the Oz books was important for her financial circumstances.)

Thompson returned to Oz during her final years in the 1970s with her last two books being published by The International Wizard of Oz Club: Yankee in Oz (1972) and The Enchanted Island of Oz (1976); the latter was not originally written as an Oz book.

In 1965, Thompson remarked that writing the books "has been an enchanting and wonderful experience, and the children and I have had tremendous fun together."

==== Reception to Thompson's Oz ====
Thompson's contributions to the Oz series are lively and imaginative, featuring a wide range of colorful and unusual characters. She emphasized humor to a greater extent than Baum did and more specifically targeted children as her primary audience. Scholar Russel B. Nye noted that Thompson's books are "a truer world of fun and fantasy, and a less complex one" than Baum's. In the 1983 Dictionary of Literary Biography, Michael Patrick Hearn wrote, "While her books may lack the philosophical and imaginative depth of Baum's best stories, Thompson's tales nevertheless consistently possess a zest, a vitality noticeably wanting in Baum's more somber interludes in his Oz books."

Illustrator John R. Neill wrote her on completing the illustrations for Kabumpo in Oz, "Incidentally, I would like to tell you how much I enjoyed reading the [manuscript] and making the pictures. After illustrating about seventeen Oz books, I think it worthwhile to let you know this with my congratulations on having secured an author of such superior qualifications to continue the work of supplying the 'Oz books.' Every feature of the child appeal is handled with the greatest skill. The whimsical, the humor, the interest and the zip of the book make me think it one of the very best Oz books so far."

=== Post Oz ===
After a falling out with Reilly & Lee in the 1930s, Thompson wrote articles, stories, and poems for various publications including Jack and Jill, Saturday Evening Post and Ladies Home Journal.

In addition she was the initial editor of Ace Comics, King Comics and later became also editor of Magic Comics, all for David McKay Publications. In some cases she used the pen name Jo King. Her friend Marge provided illustrations for many of the pieces she contributed. From 1965 to 1970 she did the Perky Puppet page for Jack and Jill .

== Oz books by Thompson ==
- 1921: The Royal Book of Oz
- 1922: Kabumpo in Oz
- 1923: The Cowardly Lion of Oz
- 1924: Grampa in Oz
- 1925: The Lost King of Oz
- 1926: The Hungry Tiger of Oz
- 1927: The Gnome King of Oz
- 1928: The Giant Horse of Oz
- 1929: Jack Pumpkinhead of Oz
- 1930: The Yellow Knight of Oz
- 1931: Pirates in Oz
- 1932: The Purple Prince of Oz
- 1933: Ojo in Oz
- 1934: Speedy in Oz
- 1935: The Wishing Horse of Oz
- 1936: Captain Salt in Oz
- 1937: Handy Mandy in Oz
- 1938: The Silver Princess in Oz
- 1939: Ozoplaning with the Wizard of Oz
- 1972: Yankee in Oz
- 1976: The Enchanted Island of Oz

A short collection of Thompson's Oz poetry, The Cheerful Citizens of Oz, was published in 1992.

== Non-Oz works by Thompson ==
=== Books ===
- The Perhappsy Chaps, P.F. Volland Co. (1918)
- The Princess of Cozytown, P.F. Volland Co. (1922)
- The Curious Cruise of Captain Santa, Reilly & Lee (1926)
- The Wonder Book, Reilly & Lee (1929)
- King Kojo, illustrated by Marge, Donald MacKay (1938)
- The Wizard of Way-Up and Other Wonders, The International Wizard of Oz Club (1985), edited by James E. Haff and Douglas G. Greene
- Sissajig and Other Surprises, The International Wizard of Oz Club (2003), edited by Ruth Berman and Douglas G. Greene

=== Poetry ===
- Epicurus, published in The Saturday Evening Post on May 9, 1931

== See also ==
- Children's literature
