= John R. Neill =

Children's book illustrator (1877–1943)

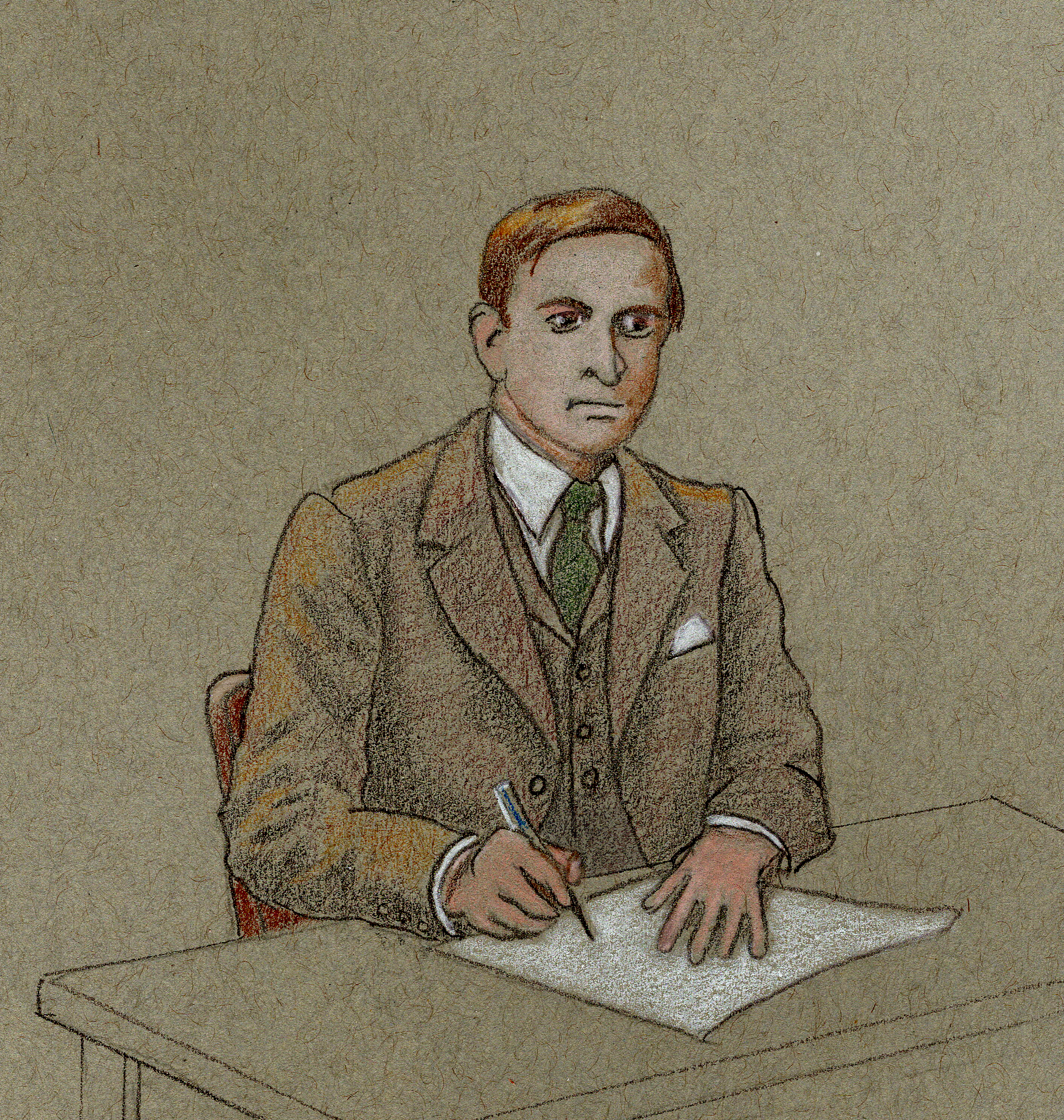
- Born: John Rea Neill; November 12, 1877; Philadelphia, Pennsylvania, US
- Died: September 13, 1943 (aged 65); Flanders, New Jersey, US
- Occupation: Illustrator
- Notable work: Land of Oz
- Spouses: Elsie G. Barrows (m. 1902; div. 1915) Margaret Carroll (m. 1919)
- Children: 3

John Rea Neill (November 12, 1877 – September 19, 1943) was a magazine and children's book illustrator primarily known for illustrating more than thirty books set in the Land of Oz. Those books include all but one of those written by L. Frank Baum, as well as those written by Ruth Plumly Thompson, and three that Neill himself wrote. He also illustrated other books, and magazine and newspaper stories.

It has been said that "Neill possessed a sweeping flair and whimsicality that brought Oz even more vividly to life," and that although Neill "is particularly remembered for his imaginative concepts; his technique, composition, and draftsmanship were equally outstanding."

== Early life ==
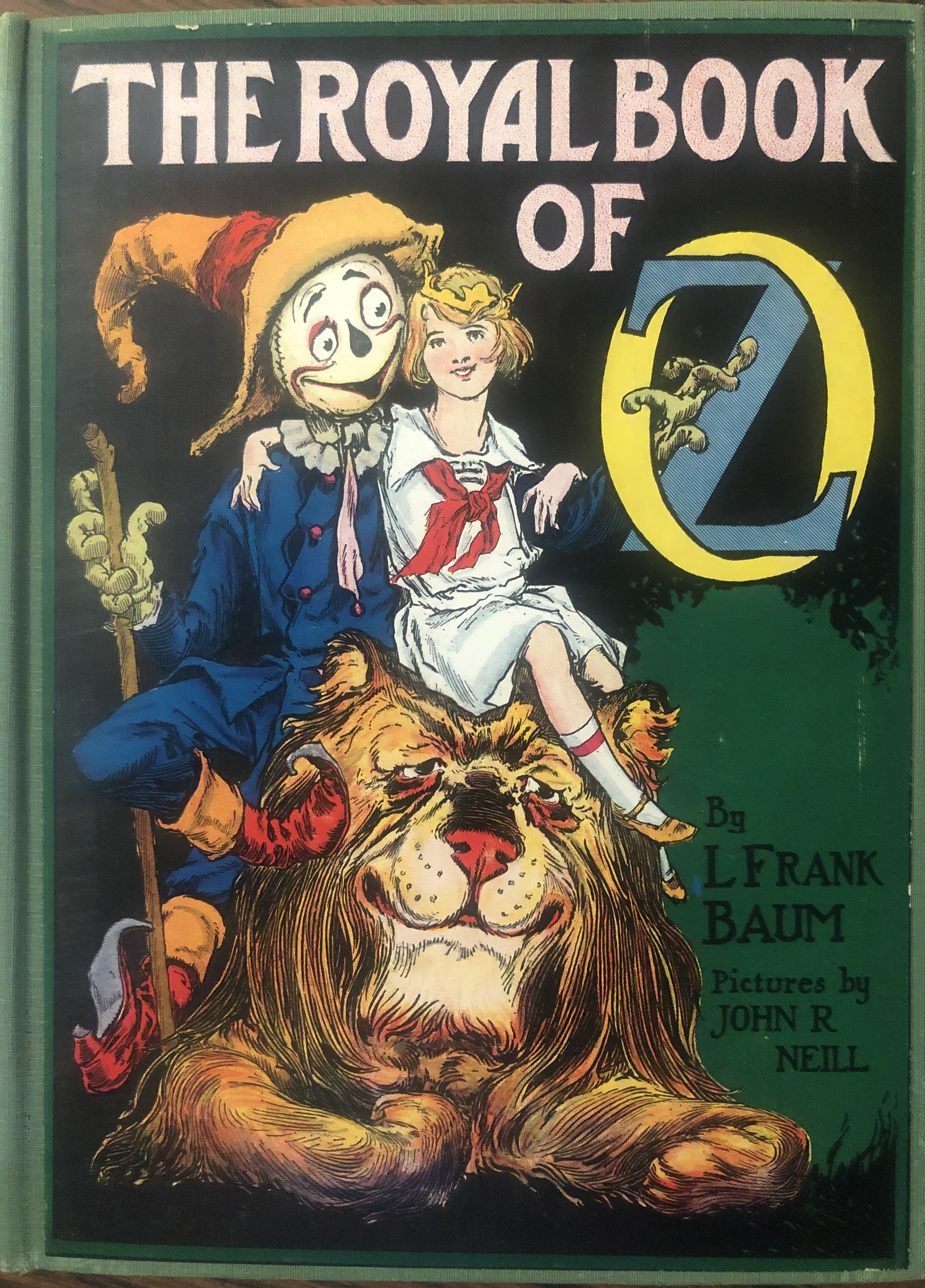
John R. Neill's artwork for the cover of The Royal Book of Oz (1921)

Neill was born in Philadelphia, Pennsylvania. Neill’s father, Robert Rea Neill, was born in Ireland in 1845, and came to the United States when he was 17. Neill’s mother, Mary, was born in Nyack, New York in 1847. Robert and Mary wed in 1870; they had eight children. They settled in the Bella Vista area of Philadelphia. Robert ran a neighborhood laundry. Neill’s father died when Neill was 10.

John R. Neill did his first illustration work for the Philadelphia's Central High School newspaper and yearbook in 1894–95. Neill then enrolled in Pennsylvania Academy of the Fine Arts, but left after one semester, purportedly saying, "They have nothing to teach me". He was 18.

In 1900 he settled in Brooklyn, New York. He was hired by The New York Evening Journal, where he met the artist Joseph Clement Coll.

He moved back to Philadelphia in 1901, and was hired by The Philadelphia Public Ledger. He married Elsie Barrows in Philadelphia on October 7, 1902. He then turned to advertising art for Wanamaker's department store in Philadelphia. In 1904, he became a staff artist of the Philadelphia North American newspaper, where he met L. Frank Baum, and he produced features including the comics strip Toyland, illustrations for the serialization of The Fate of a Crown (a book by L. Frank Baum), Children's Stories That Never Grow Old, and the Sunday comics page "The Little Journeys of Nip and Tuck" with verses by W.R. Bradford (1909–1910).

He was first commissioned to illustrate The Marvelous Land of Oz, the second Oz book L. Frank Baum wrote, published in 1904. For each Oz book, Baum's publishers would send Neill the manuscript, and Neill would work on the illustrations in a studio in Lumberville, Pennsylvania.

He and Margaret Carroll, an actress, were wed in 1919. She gave birth to three children, and they moved to Kensington Gardens, on Long Island, New York, where he had a studio and a small theater, where his daughters staged plays, and Neill painted sets. His daughters sometimes served as models for Neill as he drew the characters in the Oz books. They bought a farm in Flanders, New Jersey, where they lived for almost a decade, before Neill died of a heart ailment.

The first Oz book The Wonderful Wizard of Oz, had been illustrated by W. W. Denslow. Baum and Denslow shared the copyright for books they worked on. A disagreement arose when Denslow published images from his works with Baum, but gave Baum a diminished credit line, and again in 1900 minimized Baum’s contribution. In a letter to his publishers in 1915 Baum said, "Denslow was allowed to copyright his pictures jointly with my claim to authorship," and "having learned my lesson from my unfortunate experiences with Denslow, I will never permit another artist to have an interest in the drawings he makes of my described characters, if I ever can help it." Then in 1901 Denslow insisted on a share of the royalties for the dramatization of the musical version of The Wizard of Oz and threatened to sue. To avoid that Baum agreed to his terms, but they parted ways.

== Career ==
Neill's illustrations were published in the leading magazines of the first few decades of the twentieth century, including Collier's, Vanity Fair, The Saturday Evening Post, The Ladies Home Journal, Century, Pictorial Review, The Delineator, Boys' Life, St. Nicholas, The People's Home Journal, Adventure and many others. In 1930 and 1931, he contributed a great deal of artwork to Argosy.

== Dorothy ==
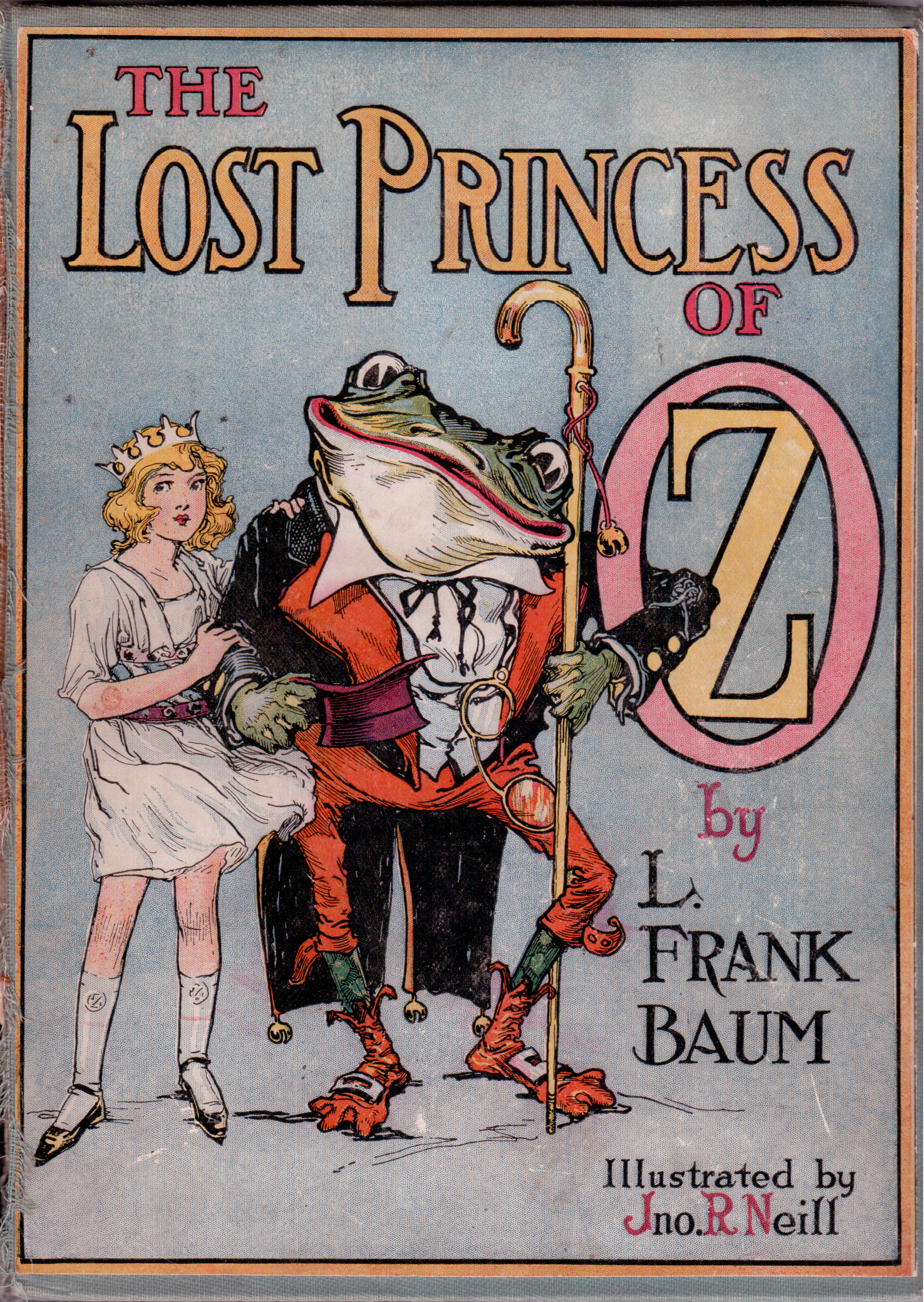
John R. Neill's depiction of Dorothy in The Lost Princess of Oz (1917)

Dorothy drawn by Denslow appeared to be a chubby five- or six-year-old with long brown hair in two thick braids that remained untied at the ends. Neill chose to illustrate a new Dorothy in 1907 when the character was reintroduced in Ozma of Oz. He illustrated the young girl in a more fashionable appearance. She is shown to be about ten years old, dressed in contemporary American fashions, with blonde hair cut in a fashionable bob. A similar modernization was given to other female characters.

Neill and Denslow each had their own way or style of drawing the characters of Oz. In The Road to Oz, Neill toys with that difference: In the Tin Woodman’s garden, Dorothy and her dog, Toto come across statues of themselves–just as "they first appeared in the Land of Oz." Neill portrays Dorothy and Toto in his graceful pen-and-ink style, while the statues are portrayed in Denslow’s style. Toto seems especially amused by this encounter.

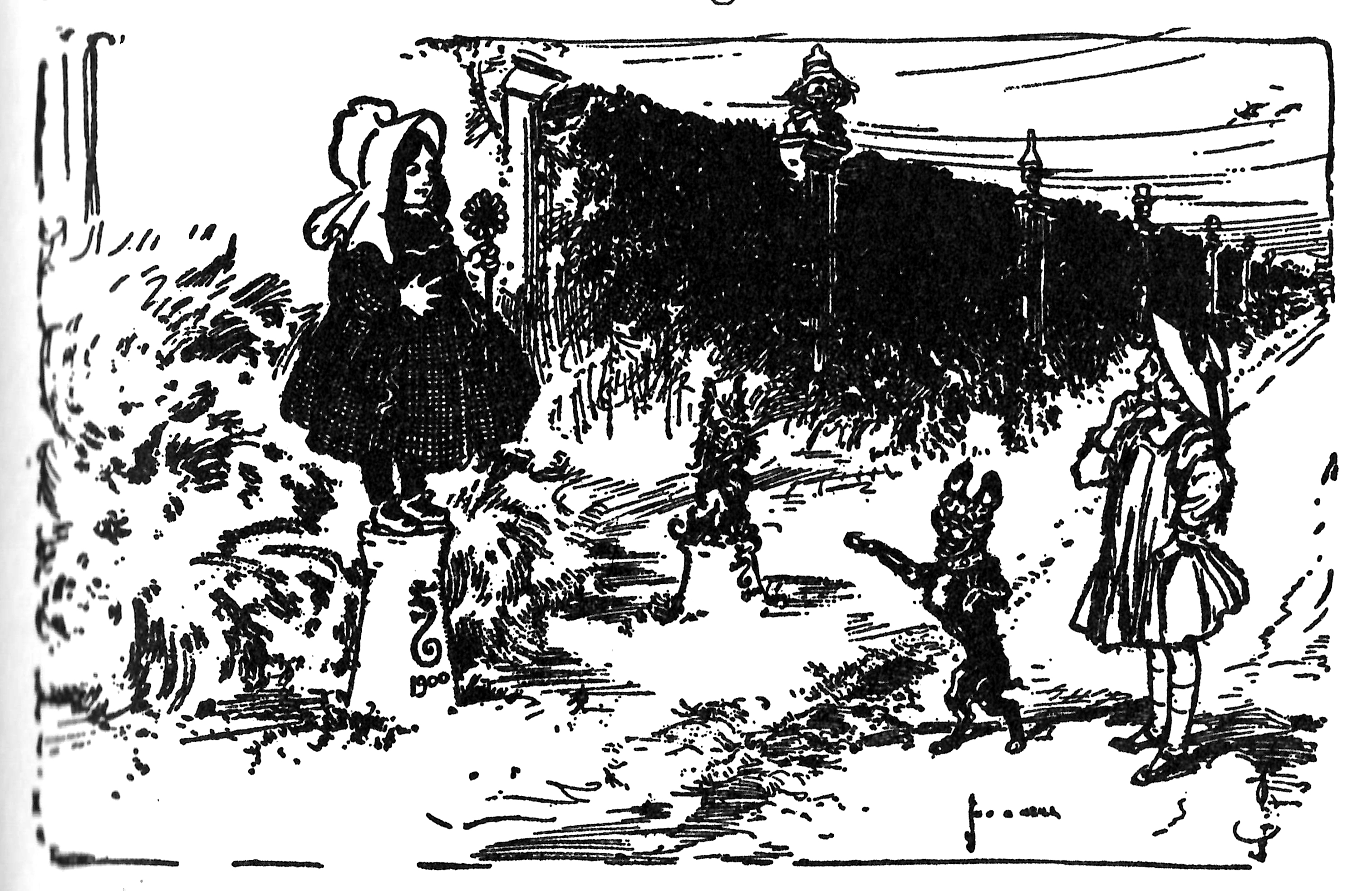
Dorothy and Toto encounter statues of themselves, illustration from The Road to Oz by L. Frank Baum

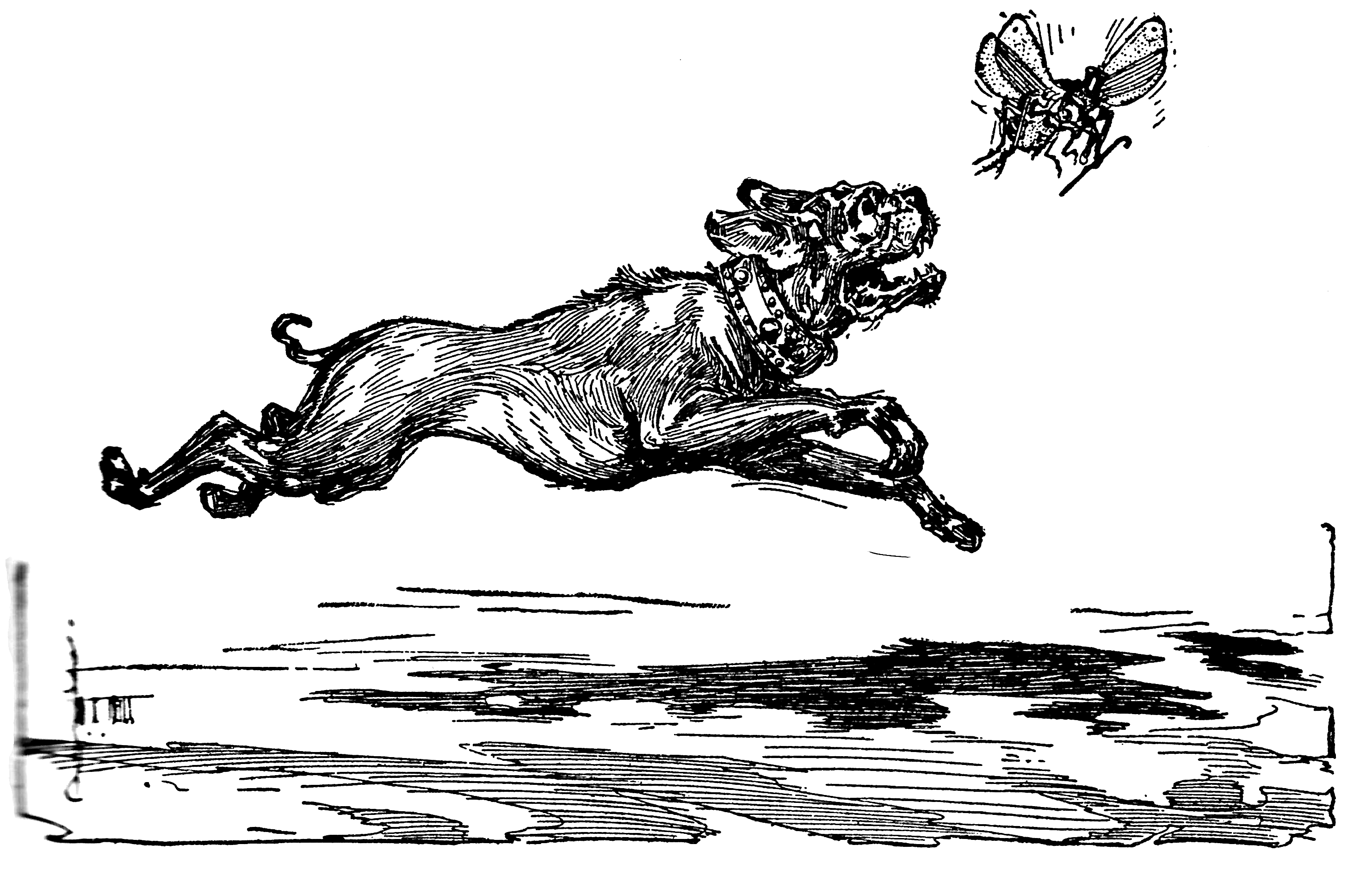
Toto from The Road to Oz

== Oz work ==
Neill illustrated 13 Oz books written by L. Frank Baum, 19 by Ruth P. Thompson, and 3 that he wrote himself. Neill has been referred to as the "Imperial Illustrator of Oz".

Neill continued to illustrate the Oz books after Baum's death. His artwork was praised for helping to give Ruth Plumly Thompson's books "legitimacy" in the eyes of Baum's fans. Neill would eventually succeed Thompson as the designated "Oz historian" and write several books himself.

Author John Goldthwaight states that "Much of the credit for those images of Oz that settle lastingly in the mind must go to his illustrators, W. W. Denslow in the inaugural volume and John R. Neil thereafter."

The Wonder City of Oz, The Scalawagons of Oz, and Lucky Bucky in Oz, which debuted each year from 1940 to 1942, were written by Neill for the publisher Reilly & Lee and are considered part of the Famous Forty. His last work, The Runaway in Oz, was drafted before his death, but the full illustrations were never finished and Reilly & Lee decided not to publish the manuscript. However, Neill's widow kept the manuscript safe, and, in 1995, it was finally published by Books of Wonder and edited and illustrated by Eric Shanower. The book's design reproduces the design used throughout almost all of the Baum, Thompson, and Neill Oz books (without the color plates), and the story itself follows the adventures of the Patchwork Girl with some new characters invented by Neill.

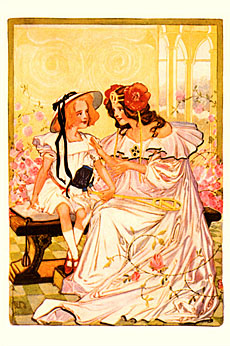
Dorothy and Ozma by John. R. Neill (1908)

== Non-Oz work ==
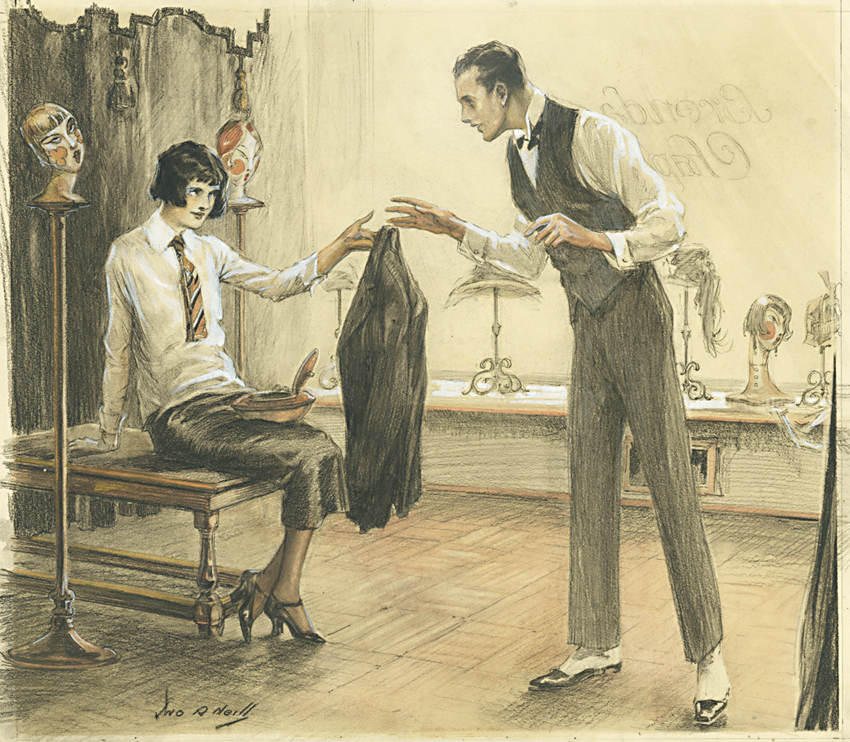
Illustration by John R. Neill for the story "An Actor's Love Story" written by R. Connell, published in Pictorial Review magazine

Here is a partial list of books, illustrated by Neill, that are not part of the Oz series.

- The Enchanted Castle; a Book of Fairy Tales, edited by Hartwell James, 1906
- Alice's Adventures in Wonderland, by Lewis Carroll, 1908
- Black Beauty, by Anna Sewell, 1908.
- The Story of Peter Rabbit & Dick Whittington and His Cat, by Beatrix Potter, 1908
- The Story of Little Black Sambo, and The Story of Topsy from Uncle Tom's Cabin, by Helen Bannerman, 1908, a book originally written in 1899, and is now disfavored.
- Cinderella, or the Little Glass Slipper, 1908
- Snow-bound, by John Greenleaf Whittier, 1909
- Hiawatha : a Poem, by Henry Wadsworth Longfellow, 1909
- The Raven and other Poems, by Edgar Allan Poe, 1910
- The Sea Fairies, by L. Frank Baum, 1911
- A Man of Means, by P. G. Wodehouse and C. H. Bovill, 1914
- A Christmas Carol, by Charles Dickens, 1915.
- Andersen’s Fairy Tales, by Hans Christian Anderson, 1923.

== Legacy ==
In 2018, "The Lost Art of Oz" project was initiated to locate and catalogue the surviving original artwork John R. Neill, W.W. Denslow, Frank Kramer, Richard 'Dirk' Gringhuis and Dick Martin created to illustrate the Oz book series. According to "The Lost Art of Oz" project, as he worked on illustrating the Oz books, Neill "created approximately 4,000 pen and ink and watercolor illustrations. Only about 350 are known to have survived."
