= The Tik-Tok Man of Oz =

Musical play by L. Frank Baum

- A Companion Play to The Wizard of Oz
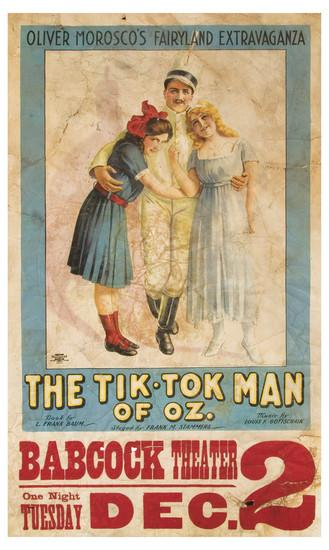
- Poster depicting Private Files, Betsy Bobbin, and Polychrome
- Music: Louis F. Gottschalk; Victor Schertzinger
- Lyrics: L. Frank Baum; Oliver Morosco
- Book: L. Frank Baum
- Basis: Ozma of Oz by L. Frank Baum
- Productions: Oliver Morosco, 1913; Eric Shanower, 2014

The Tik-Tok Man of Oz is a musical play with book and lyrics by L. Frank Baum and music by Louis F. Gottschalk that opened at the Majestic Theatre in Los Angeles, California on March 31, 1913. It is loosely inspired by Baum's book Ozma of Oz (1907), incorporates much of the material from Baum's book The Road to Oz (1909), and was the basis for his 1914 novel, Tik-Tok of Oz. It was promoted as "A Companion Play to The Wizard of Oz" and directed by Frank M. Stammers. The play is known from its advertising and published music, but survives only in earlier manuscript.

== Genesis ==
The Shubert Organization expressed interest in an extravaganza based on Ozma of Oz in 1909. The play began as a collaboration between Baum and composer Manuel Klein, an employee of the Shuberts, which they worked on during February–April 1909, first under the title, The Rainbow's Daughter, or the Magnet of Love, but eventually retitled Ozma of Oz, or The Magnet of Love. It incorporated elements of The Road to Oz, which was published that July, mainly in the inclusion of two of its new characters, the Shaggy Man and Polychrome, the Rainbow's daughter (which created some continuity inconsistencies when it was adapted to the novel), both of which were influenced by Prince Silverwings. Betsy Bobbin was intended to be Dorothy Gale, but the characters in The Wizard of Oz and The Woggle-Bug were contractually unavailable to him—although "Ozma" remained from The Woggle-Bug, she was a wholly different character renamed Ozga for the books. It also adapted the Rose Kingdom from the Kingdom of Mangaboos in Dorothy and the Wizard in Oz, and Queen Ann was derived from General Jinjur in spite of the failure of The Woggle-Bug. The show languished before 1912, when Oliver Morosco agreed to produce it.

== Adaptation ==
The musical play The Tik-Tok Man of Oz was based on L. Frank Baum's 1907 Oz book Ozma of Oz, which in turn had incorporated material from Baum's unpublished manuscript King Rinkitink. The play incorporated material that Baum also used in his 1908 Oz book Dorothy and the Wizard in Oz. Baum used his characters of the Shaggy Man and Polychrome in both the play and his 1909 Oz book The Road to Oz, which he was working on at the same time. Newspaper accounts indicate that Baum began work on the play in late 1906 or early 1907, but it would take until March 1913 to be produced on stage.

L. Frank Baum based two of his Oz stories, the novel Tik-Tok of Oz and the short story Tiktok and the Nome King, on this play.

In the play, Ozma is a princess in the Rose Kingdom and is analogous to Ozga in the novel, who is Private Files's love interest, as is Ozga in the novel, there described as Ozma's cousin. Michael Patrick Hearn speculates that both names are in honor of Baum's wife, Maud Gage (MAud GAge).

The play introduces several characters that will be familiar with readers of the novel, Tik-Tok of Oz, such as Private Jo Files, who was portrayed by Charles Ruggles during the beginning of his career, and Queen Ann Soforth of Oogaboo, who was ultimately played by Charlotte Greenwood near the end of the run.

== Production ==
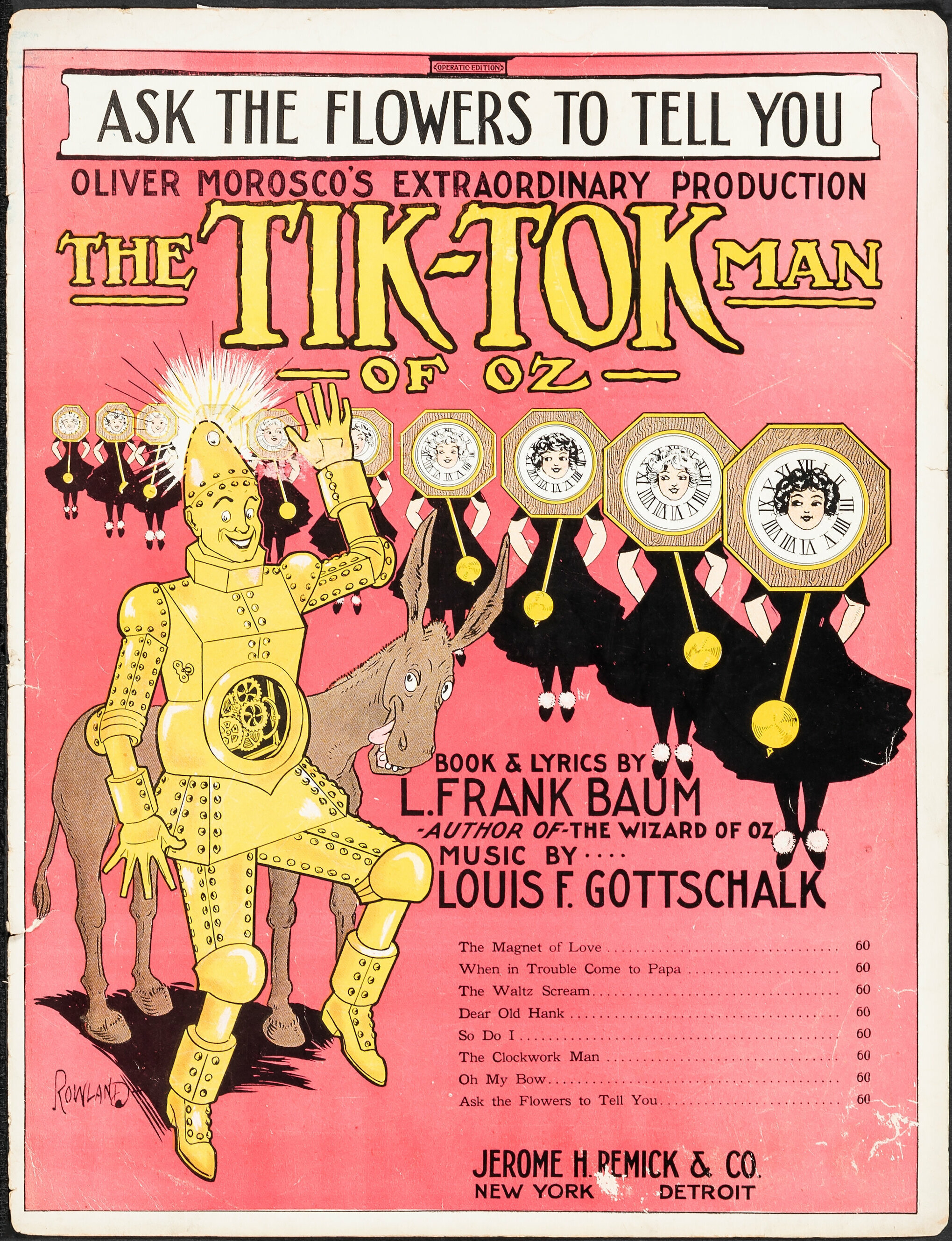
A 1913 sheet music cover for the song, Ask the Flowers to Tell You

The musical was directed by Frank Stammers, with scenery designed by Robert Brunton. It was produced by Oliver Morosco. The production opened at the Majestic Theatre in Los Angeles on March 31, 1913. By September 1913 Morosco deemed it not successful enough to take it to Broadway, even though he had inserted three songs of his own writing with music by Victor Schertzinger. The show was extremely popular in Los Angeles and San Francisco, but it was greeted lukewarmly by critics in Chicago, who consistently compared it to the earlier 1902 play The Wizard of Oz. Among the mixed to negative reviewers was Amy Leslie of the Chicago Daily News, who described it as a "revival instead of a sequel," finding Gottschalk's music "delicious" but inconsequential to the spectacle of pretty girls and special effects. Leslie claimed that Baum "has no more sense of humor than one of his talking bats or mealy kittens." The show ran successfully through much of the summer in Chicago, despite critical boredom. The New York Review on October 18, 1913, noted that the play was to close for two weeks for practical reconstruction of the sets, and noted it was likely to open in winter in one of the three largest Eastern cities, but this was still up to Morosco. The article described it as "a Western production." Although The Tik-Tok Man of Oz was still making money, Morosco decided it was too expensive to continue running or to risk the Broadway run that had been originally planned. After the Chicago run, it continued for five months on the road throughout the American midwest, Canada, and the American west, before closing once again in Los Angeles in late January 1914.

Oliver Morosco would later cast Charlotte Greenwood, the final Queen Ann, in So Long Letty, a role he had commissioned for her that would make her a star. The Oz Scrapbook erroneously captions Josie Intropidi as Queen Ann with Charlotte Greenwood's name.

== Revivals ==
An early draft of Ozma of Oz, provided by Michael Patrick Hearn, has been performed in readings at conventions of The International Wizard of Oz Club. It was performed with the Gottschalk songs (Klein was still assigned to the project when it had this title, but it is not known what, if anything, he composed) at the Ozmopolitan Convention (Holland, Michigan) in 1982 and the Munchkin (Wilmington, Delaware) and Winkie (Pacific Grove, California) Conventions in 1984. This production premiered at the Castle Club Theatre, June 19, 1982, and starred Marc Lewis as Tik-Tok and Ruggedo, John Fricke as Private Files, Rob Roy MacVeigh as The Shaggy Man, and Robin Olderman as Betsy, Polychrome, Ozma, and Queen Ann. For the 1984 performances, Jeryl Metz joined the cast to play Polychrome and Dick Martin provided the promotional artwork.

A fully staged revival prepared by Eric Shanower from the surviving portions of The Tik-Tok Man of Oz script supplemented by the earlier Ozma of Oz draft was performed on August 9, 2014, at Winkie Con 50 in San Diego, California. All nineteen of the surviving musical pieces were heard, along with commercially released "Selections" and music provided by Louis F. Gottschalk's daughter Gloria Gottschalk Morgan. Chrissy Burns directed a cast of nineteen, Joseph Grienenberger music directed, Jennifer Solomon-Rubio choreographed, Christopher Boltz designed the lighting, and David Maxine and Eric Shanower co-designed sets and costumes.

Eric Shanower who prepared the 2014 revival wrote and published All Wound Up: The Making of The Tik-Tok Man of Oz in 2023 after 9 years of research on the show.

== Plot ==
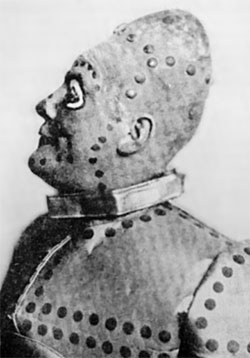
James C. Morton as Tik Tok

The plot, similar to the novel Tik-Tok of Oz, but lacking Quox and the journey to the kingdom of Tititi-Hoochoo, deals with the Shaggy Man's attempt to rescue his brother, Wiggy (unnamed in the novel), from the Dominions of Ruggedo, the Metal Monarch. Meanwhile, Queen Ann Soforth seeks to lead an army against the world with every man (17 officers and one private) in her tiny kingdom of Oogaboo. Betsy Bobbin and her companion, a mule named Hank, are brought to the land in a shipwreck and storm not unlike the one in Ozma of Oz. In the Rose Kingdom they meet the Shaggy Man and rescue Ozma, the Rose Princess. Later they meet Polychrome, the Rainbow's Daughter, whom Ruggedo tries to keep in his kingdom to brighten it up. As Baum put it in the introduction of Tik-Tok of Oz, "There is a play called The Tik-Tok Man of Oz, but it is not like this story of Tik-Tok of Oz, although some of the adventures recorded in this book, as well as those in several other Oz books, are included in the play. Those who have seen the play and those who have read the other Oz books will find in this story a lot of strange characters and adventures that they have never heard of before."

== Cast ==
- Tik-Tok—James C. Morton
- Shaggy Man—Frank Moore
- Betsy Bobbin—Lenora Novasio
- Hank the Mule—Fred Woodward
- Queen Ann Soforth—Josie Intropidi (later replaced with Charlotte Greenwood)
- Private Files—Charles Ruggles (later replaced with Charles Purcell and then with Sydney Grant)
- Ozma—Vera Doria (later replaced with Adele Rowland, Ilon Bergere, Beatriz Michelena, and Gipsy Dale)
- Polychrome—Dolly Castles
- Ruggedo—Eugene Cowles (later replaced with John Dunsmure)
- The Shaggy Man's brother—Thomas Meegan

Harry Kelly, who had previously turned down the title role in The Woggle-Bug, and Joe Whitehead replaced Morton and Moore in the leads while they vacationed.

== Songs ==
My Wonderful Dream Girl
A 1913 sound recording of My Wonderful Dream Girl performed by John Barnes Wells

All songs are written by Baum and Gottschalk unless otherwise specified. Fourteen of the Baum/Gottschalk collaborations and three of the Morosco/Schertzinger collaborations survive. At least twelve musical numbers are lost.

- Prelude – “A Storm at Sea” – Dance of Waves
- “An Apple’s the Cause of It All” – Shaggy Man
- “The Magnet of Love” – Betsy
- “Oh! My Bow” with Dance of the Rainbows – Polychrome with Rainbow Girls
- “I Want to Be Somebody’s Girlie” – Polychrome * (Victor Schertzinger and Oliver Morosco)
- “The Clockwork Man” – Tik-Tok, Betsy, Shaggy
- “The Army of Oogaboo” – Queen Ann, Files, and the Army of Oogaboo
- “There’s a Mate in This Big World for You” – Ozma * (Victor Schertzinger and Oliver Morosco)
- “Ask the Flowers to Tell You” – Ozma and Files
- “Dear Old Hank” – Betsy
- “Act One Finale” – Principals and Field Flowers
- “Imps March” – Dance of Metal Imps
- “Work, Lads, Work” – Ruggedo with Metal Imps
- “When in Trouble Come to Papa” – Ruggedo and Polychrome
- “Fight for Oogaboo” – Ann and Officers of the Army of Oogaboo
- “Rainbow Bride” – Polychrome with Ruggedo, Ann, Shaggy, Betsy, and Tik-Tok
- “My Wonderful Dream Girl” – Files * (Victor Schertzinger and Oliver Morosco)
- “Folly!” – Tik-Tok, Betsy, and Shaggy
- “Oh! Take Me” – Ozma and Files * (Victor Schertzinger and Oliver Morosco)
- “Just for Fun” – Ozma and Files
- “Forgotten” – Ruggedo * (Eugene Cowles and Flora Wulschner)
- “So Do I!” – Tik-Tok and Ruggedo
- “One! Two! Three! All Over” – Shaggy, Tik-Tok, and Ruggedo * (Safford Waters and Paul West)
- “The Waltz Scream” – Ann and Shaggy
- “The Magnet of Love” (Chorus) Reprise – All

Songs added throughout the tour are denoted by *

Two player piano rolls of suites and vintage recordings of "Ask the Flowers to Tell You" and "My Wonderful Dream Girl" can be found on Disc 2 of David Maxine's collection of Vintage Recordings from the 1903 Musical The Wizard of Oz (2003), while James Patrick Doyle performs a suite of many of the songs on synthesizer in his collection Before the Rainbow: The Original Music of Oz (1999), both released by Hungry Tiger Press.

== See also ==
- The Wizard of Oz (adaptations)
