= Prince Silverwings =

Children's book

First edition (publ. McClurg)

Prince Silverwings and Other Stories is a 1902 children's book by Edith Ogden Harrison. The book is best known because she collaborated with L. Frank Baum on an uncompleted stage adaptation of the book as a musical extravaganza in 1903. Baum composed music for the play as well, and at least one of these songs, "Down Among the Marshes," survives and has been recorded by James Patrick Doyle on his 1999 album, Before the Rainbow: The Original Music of Oz, and Baum scholar Michael O. Riley published a complete edition of their Scenario and General Synopsis for the play through the Pamami Press in 1982 in a limited run of 125 copies in white cloth bound in purple with illustrations by Dick Martin. It is otherwise known only from a typescript in the Chicago Historical Society.

The play, which was never staged, is discussed at length in "The Faltering Flight of Prince Silverwings" by David L. Greene, Peter Hanff, and Michael Patrick Hearn in the Autumn, 1974 issue of The Baum Bugle (18:2). They argue that the work depicts the beginnings of such Oz characters as the Nome King, Trot, the Shaggy Man, Polychrome, and John Dough as well as the premises for Ozma of Oz, Tik-Tok of Oz, and Rinkitink in Oz owe a debt to this collaboration.
