= The Giant Garden of Oz =

1993 novel written and illustrated by Eric Shanower

- Author: Eric Shanower
- Illustrator: Eric Shanower
- Language: English
- Genre: Children's novel Fantasy
- Publisher: Emerald City Press / Books of Wonder
- Publication date: 1993
- Publication place: United States
- Media type: Print (Hardcover)
- Pages: 178
- ISBN: 0-929605-41-1
- OCLC: 34199606
- Preceded by: The Wicked Witch of Oz
- Followed by: The Runaway in Oz

The Giant Garden of Oz is an unofficial entry in the Oz series by L. Frank Baum and his successors written and illustrated by Eric Shanower, first published in 1993 by Emerald City Press, a division of Books of Wonder.

== Synopsis ==
Temporally, Shanower places his novel at the end of the twentieth century; he takes up the story of Uncle Henry and Aunt Em, the surrogate parents of Dorothy Gale. In his sixth Oz book, The Emerald City of Oz, Baum had brought the two characters from the mundane world of Kansas to the Emerald City, where they enjoyed a blissful retirement. At the start of The Giant Garden of Oz, the couple, "after eighty-some years of a life of luxury," have decided to return to farming. (Inhabitants of Oz do not age, unless they want to.) They have acquired a small farm in the Munchkin Country; with magical aids designed by the Wizard of Oz, their farm labor is much less demanding than in the Kansas of their past.

Dorothy comes to pay her first visit to the new farm — but encounters an unprecedented problem. Overnight, the couple's vegetable garden grows to enormous size, with giant beets, broccoli, peppers, and watermelons, and heads of cabbage twenty feet high. The farmhouse is hemmed in by a vegetable wall. Dorothy sets out for the Emerald City, climbing a landscape of mountainous produce. Outside the garden, she crosses the Munchkin Country and meets new friends, principally a white-and-purple cow named Imogene, who gives varying dairy products depending upon her mood:

When I'm content I give regular plain old milk. When I'm thinking hard and get into a brown study I give chocolate milk. When I'm sad and blue I give skim milk. When I get excited, which doesn't happen often, I give butter. And when I get real angry, sour cream.

In a crisis, Imogene can yield a healing golden milk; and in the course of the tale, she gives whipped cream and ice cream too. (Imogene the cow originated in The Wizard of Oz, the 1902 stage adaptation of The Wonderful Wizard of Oz.)

Imogene talks Dorothy into accepting her companionship (the cow wants to see the Emerald City). With the help of the Wizard, Dorothy begins to unravel the mystery of the giant garden, and to follow the trail of a would-be witch called Old Magda who is its cause. The task isn't easy; the trio endure a thunderstorm and a near-crash-landing during a balloon flight.

Magda created a giantism potion to make her gardening more productive and her life easier — but lost control of it; giant moles, eating the giant vegetables, become a pest to all and sundry. Dorothy falls prey to giantism herself and endures a subterranean ordeal before she, the Wizard, and Princess Ozma resolve the problem and restore the normal order of Oz.

In the end, Dorothy and her friends face a choice. They rescue Old Magda and Imogene the cow from being buried alive; then they learn that they can revive one or the other, but not both. Saving the old witch can lead to the antidote for Dorothy's giantism; but Dorothy finds she cannot allow her bovine companion to die. Once recovered, however, Imogene supplies the golden milk that restores Magda too. The antidote is obtained, and Dorothy is restored to her normal size. Old Magda reforms, and Imogene gets her tour of the Emerald City.

The Oz books
Previous book: The Wicked Witch of Oz	The Giant Garden of Oz; 1993	Next book: The Runaway in Oz
