= The Emerald City of Oz =

1910 novel by L. Frank Baum

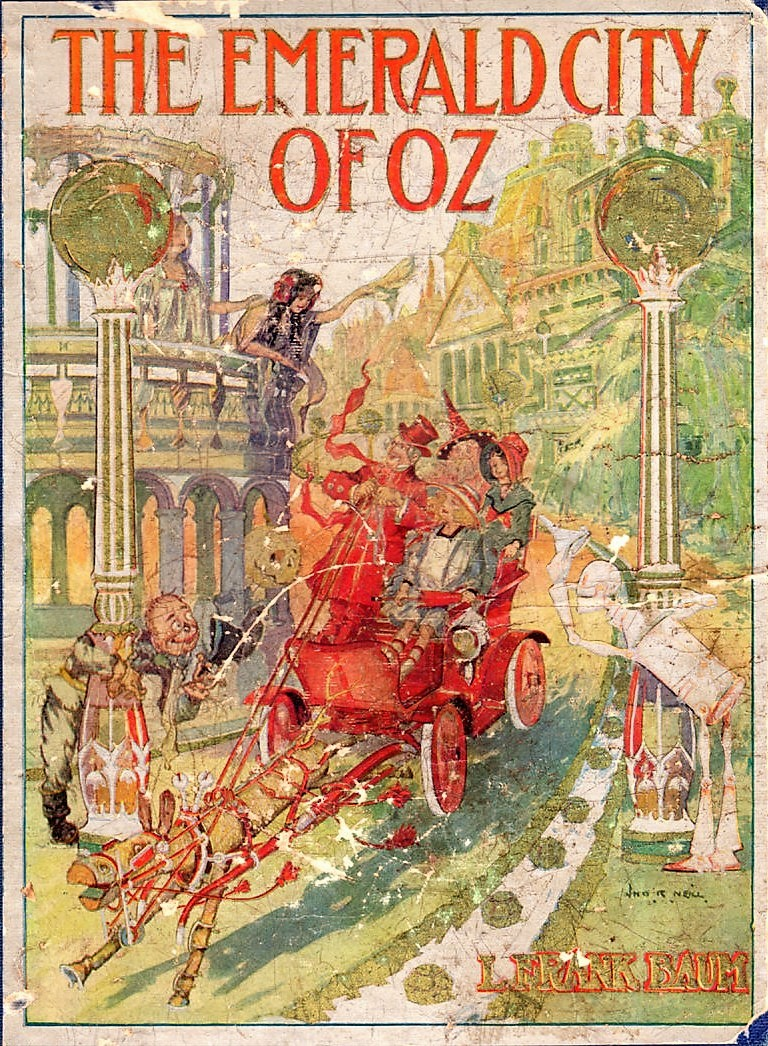
- First edition design
- Author: L. Frank Baum
- Illustrator: John R. Neill
- Language: English
- Series: The Oz Books
- Genre: Children's novel
- Publisher: Reilly & Britton
- Publication date: 1910
- Publication place: United States
- Media type: Print (hardcover)
- Pages: 296
- Preceded by: The Road to Oz
- Followed by: The Patchwork Girl of Oz
- Text: The Emerald City of Oz at Wikisource

The Emerald City of Oz is the sixth book in L. Frank Baum's Oz series. Originally published on July 20, 1910, it is the story of Dorothy Gale and her Uncle Henry and Aunt Em coming to live in Oz permanently. While they are toured through the Quadling Country, the Nome King is assembling allies for an invasion of Oz. This is the first time in the Oz series that Baum made use of double plots for one of the books.

Baum had intended to cease writing Oz stories with this book, but financial pressures prompted him to write and publish The Patchwork Girl of Oz three years later, with seven other Oz books to follow.

== Plot summary ==
At the beginning of this story, it is made quite clear that Dorothy Gale (the primary protagonist of many of the previous Oz books), is in the habit of freely speaking of her many adventures in the Land of Oz to her only living relatives, her Aunt Em and Uncle Henry. Neither of them believes a word of her stories, but consider her a dreamer, as her dead mother had been. She is undeterred.

Later, it is revealed that the destruction of their farmhouse by the cyclone back in The Wonderful Wizard of Oz has left Uncle Henry in terrible debt. In order to pay it, he has taken out a mortgage on his farm. If he cannot repay his creditors, they will seize the farm, thus leaving Henry and his family homeless. He is not too afraid for himself, but both he and his wife, Aunt Em, fear very much for their niece's future. Upon learning this, Dorothy quickly arranges with Princess Ozma to let her bring her guardians to Oz where they will be happier and forever safe. Using the Magic Belt (a tool captured from the jealous Nome King Roquat), Ozma transports them to her throne room. They are given rooms to live in and luxuries to enjoy, including a vast and complex wardrobe, and meet with many of Dorothy's old friends, including the Cowardly Lion and Billina the Yellow Hen.

In the underground Nome Kingdom, the Nome King Roquat is plotting to conquer the Land of Oz and recover his magic belt, which Dorothy took from him in Ozma of Oz. General Blug suggested that King Roquat have their forces dig a tunnel under the Deadly Desert. After ordering the expulsion of General Blug (who will not agree to such an attack due to the powers of Princess Ozma) and the death of Colonel Crinkle (who also refuses) where he was sliced thin in a torture chamber and fed to a bunch of Seven-Headed Dogs, King Roquat holds counsel with a veteran soldier called Guph. Guph believes that against the many magicians of Oz (the reputation of which has grown in the telling), the Nome Army has no chance alone. He therefore sets out personally to recruit allies from other parts of Nonestica.

Dorothy, accompanied by the Wizard of Oz and several other friends, departs the Emerald City in a carriage drawn by the Wooden Sawhorse, intending to give her aunt and uncle a tour of the land.

The Nome General Guph visits three nations: the Whimsies, the Growleywogs and the diabolical Phanfasms of Phantastico. Having learned of this through Ozma's omniscient Magic Picture, the people of Oz become worried. As the Nomes dig a tunnel for the combined armies to get under the Deadly Desert to the heart of the Emerald City, Ozma uses her Magic Belt to wish for a large amount of dust to appear in the tunnel. Upon emerging, the Nome King's allies therefore drink thirstily from the nearby Fountain of Oblivion, whose waters make them forget their evil plans. The Nome King himself avoids the drink, but is thrown into the fountain by the Scarecrow and the Tin Woodman, which erases his memory too.

Ozma uses the Magic Belt to send the Nome King and his allies back to their respective lands. To forestall a future invasion of Oz, Glinda the Good Witch uses a magic charm to render Oz invisible and unreachable to everyone except those within the land itself.

== Commentary ==
The Emerald City of Oz contains more material on the social organization of Oz than most of the earlier books, and as a consequence has attracted commentary on its Utopian aspects. The "explicitly socialist" economy of Oz has been contrasted to other "fantasy" projections of socialist societies, like Edward Bellamy's Looking Backward (1888) and William Morris's News from Nowhere (1890). How far such analyses and comparisons should be pursued is, of course, open to debate; as Baum writes of the social structure of Oz in Chapter Three, p. 31, "I do not suppose such an arrangement would be practical with us...." There are also strong similarities between The Emerald City of Oz (and to a certain extent the other Oz books) and the 1915 feminist utopia Herland (novel) by Charlotte Perkins Gilman. Today probably best known for The Yellow Wallpaper, Gilman was, like Baum, a newspaper editor who used her publication as a platform for social reform. The literary connection between Gilman and Baum is thought to be another campaigning newspaper editor, Matilda Joslyn Gage, the women's rights activist who happened to be the mother of Baum's wife, Maud Gage Baum. Sally Roesch Wagner of The Matilda Joslyn Gage Foundation published The Wonderful Mother of Oz describing how Matilda Gage's feminist politics were sympathetically channeled by her son-in-law into his Oz books.

Gregory Maguire, author of the revisionist Oz novels Wicked and Son of a Witch, has written that The Emerald City of Oz "is suffused with an elegiac quality" and compares its tone with that of The Last Battle, the final volume of C. S. Lewis' Chronicles of Narnia.

The Forbidden Fountain that Baum introduces in this book recurs in later books, by him and by his various successors. The Fountain is an important feature in The Magic of Oz (1919), by Baum and in The Forbidden Fountain of Oz (1980), The Wicked Witch of Oz (1993), and Paradox in Oz (1999).

== Adaptations ==
The 1986 Japanese animated series Oz no Mahōtsukai included the story. It was later shortened and edited into a single feature for US video and DVD release.

== In popular culture ==
In the 2004 movie Blade: Trinity, Sommerfield is shown reading a Braille copy of the book to her daughter Zoe, including a short description of the Nome King and how he had "never tried to be good". Later in the movie, Zoe is confronted by the film's main antagonist, Drake, and initially guesses that he is the Nome King.

== Footnotes ==
The Oz books
Previous book: The Road to Oz	The Emerald City of Oz; 1910	Next book: The Patchwork Girl of Oz
