= Queen Ann in Oz =

1993 children's novel written by Karyl Carlson and Eric Gjovaag

- Author: Karyl Carlson & Eric Gjovaag
- Illustrator: William Campbell & Irwin Terry
- Cover artist: William Campbell & Irwin Terry
- Language: English
- Series: The Oz Books
- Genre: Children's Novel Fantasy
- Publisher: Emerald City Press / Books of Wonder
- Publication date: 1993
- Publication place: United States
- Media type: Print
- Pages: 116
- ISBN: 978-0-929605-25-8
- OCLC: 30045005

Queen Ann in Oz is a 1993 children's novel written by Karyl Carlson and Eric Gjovaag, and illustrated by William Campbell and Irwin Terry. The book is an entry in the large and growing literature in the Oz series, begun by L. Frank Baum and continued by many successors.

Queen Ann in Oz is a sequel to Baum's 1914 novel Tik-Tok of Oz, and derives characters and plot elements from that book. The sequel occurs "several years" after the original story. Queen Ann Soforth of Oogaboo (the title character), the Shaggy Man, and Tik-Tok all re-appear; and Moretomore, a small orange dragon, is a hatchling of Quox, the big dragon in Baum's book.

== Synopsis ==
At home in Oogaboo, a tiny principality in the northwestern corner of Oz, Queen Ann is restless for a new adventure; she decides to search for her lost parents, King Jol Jemkiph Soforth and Queen Dede Soforth. Her attempt to re-muster her army is a total failure; but four enterprising children are eager to join her search party. They are a girl and three boys, Jody Buttons, Jo Musket, Jo Fountainpen, and Jo Dragon (with his pet Moretomore). Ann also writes to the Shaggy Man, inviting him to meet them on their way.

After receiving Ann's letter via mailbird, the Shaggy Man investigates the situation, but with limited success. Glinda's Great Book of Records is surprisingly unhelpful on the location of the missing royals. It follows their activities well enough, up to a point — then breaks off with a cryptic "forget it." Princess Ozma tries to find them in the Magic Picture, but it shows only a pink haze with the inscription "no data available."

Shaggy meets Ann and her party; they travel to Sand City, ruled by King Lysander and Queen Cassandra. (Puns and word play on "sand" flow freely.) A patch of quicksand speeds them on their way. They encounter the overly eager practitioners of Barberville, and spend an idyllic interval at the Friendly Forest.

Finally they reach a wall with a gate in it. The gate bears a strange warning:

FORGETVILLE

Beware the

The wall surrounds a fog-shrouded village. When the members of the party enter, they lose their memories. Moretomore is immune from the spell, because he carries with him a fragment of his natal eggshell, which prevents him from ever forgetting anything. The little dragon is desperate to help his companions, but doesn't know what to do. Ozma, however, has been monitoring the Shaggy Man's progress, as she told him she would; and she sends Tik-Tok to help. The mechanical man brings the search party members out of Forgetville. The searchers learn to counter the memory spell with forget-me-nots, and they draw the inhabitants out too — including the lost King and Queen of Oogaboo. They also seek to end the spell on the town.

They find and read the journal of Amnesia, the witch who cast the spell. They learn that they can bring the wall down with the "Ancient Traditional Wall Removal Method." Shaggy suspects that this is a reference to the story of Jericho. The searchers and townspeople re-enact the siege of Jericho; they march around the city seven times, Jo Musket plays his trumpet, and the multitude shouts at dawn. The wall falls and the spell is broken. Forgetville returns to being the town of Goldendale, as it was before.

Ozma arrives with breakfast; together, the characters piece out the story of how Goldendale lost its memory, a tale that involves Jo Jemkiph, the witch Amnesia, and the Love Magnet (from The Road to Oz). Ozma uses the Magic Belt to bring the former Amnesia, now Amy, from Butterfield, Kansas, where the Shaggy Man knew her and stole the Love Magnet from her (closing a story loop with Baum's original books). In the process, the Shaggy Man's true name is revealed: he's Shagrick Mann (but Ozma agrees to keep this knowledge secret).

Ann's reunion with her parents is a happy one. The people of Goldendale choose Jol Jemkiph and Dede Soforth as their rulers. Ann remains in power in Oogaboo.

== Old-time religion ==
The story of the siege of Jericho is told in the Old Testament of the Bible, primarily in the Book of Joshua, Chapter 6. Baum, however, was not a traditional Christian; to the contrary, he was skeptical of organized religion, and influenced by spiritualism and Theosophy. Biblical allusions and references are generally not found in Baum's work. In bringing the story of Jericho into Queen Ann in Oz, Carlson and Gjovaag take the Oz mythos in an atypical direction.
