= Billina =

- Oz character
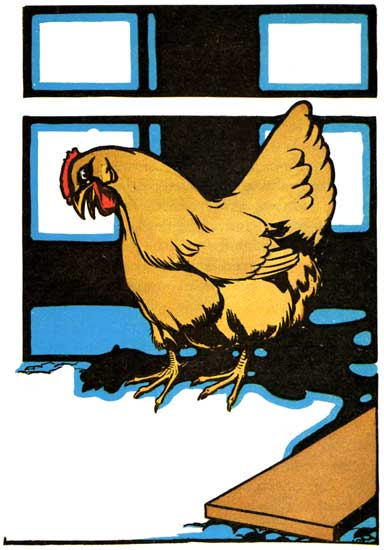
- Billina illustration by John R. Neill
- First appearance: Ozma of Oz (1907)
- Created by: L. Frank Baum
- Portrayed by: Mak Wilson (Return to Oz)
- Voiced by: Denise Bryer (Return to Oz)

In-universe information
- Alias: Bill
- Species: Chicken
- Gender: Female
- Children: multiple Dorothys and Daniels

Billina is a fictional character in the classic children's series of Oz books by American author L. Frank Baum. She is introduced in Ozma of Oz (1907).

== History ==
In Ozma of Oz, Billina becomes Dorothy Gale's animal companion after she and the girl are on a small ship and are thrown overboard. Dorothy was traveling on an ocean voyage to Australia with her Uncle Henry when a violent storm hit, thus tossing the ship over the waves. The two wash up on the uncharted shores of the enchanted country of Ev in a chicken coop they had taken refuge in. Billina serves in this adventure the role that Dorothy's pet dog Toto served in the first Oz book, The Wonderful Wizard of Oz (1900).

A spunky, sassy and talkative chicken, Billina was originally named Bill because, she tells Dorothy, "no one could tell whether I was going to be a hen or a rooster". Dorothy insists on changing the hen's name to a feminine form. Billina endures several scares with the Kansas farm girl before they defeat the Nome King as only a hen can since eggs are poisonous to Nomes. At the end of the novel, Billina settles in the Emerald City in the magical Land of Oz.

In The Road to Oz (1909), Billina accompanies Tik-Tok in welcoming Dorothy, Shaggy Man, Button-Bright, and Polychrome to Oz. Billina is later present at Princess Ozma's royal birthday party.

Later books reveal that Billina has hatched many chicks (their father unknown). She names all of them Dorothy after her young friend. Gender confusion reappears, however, and the proud mother discovers that some of those chicks will be "horrid roosters"; she changes the males' names to Daniel.

One of Baum's earliest books described raising Hamburg chickens, and he drew on that expertise in depicting Billina.

== Other adaptations ==
Billina appears in The Fairylogue and Radio-Plays (1908) with the credit "The Yellow Hen as Herself". Presumably a real hen was used in this lost film, as a real dog was used for Toto, also credited with playing himself.

In Disney's Return to Oz (1985), Billina is a main character. She is an animatronic puppet performed by Mak Wilson and voiced by Denise Bryer. Like the books, Billina arrived in the Land of Oz with Dorothy Gale. Later on, she hides in Jack Pumpkinhead's head. During the final battle against the Nome King in his monstrous form, Billina unintentionally lays an egg which falls into the Nome King's mouth enough to kill him. When Princess Ozma is crowned, upon being freed from the mirror by Dorothy, Billina elects to remain in the Land of Oz.

Billina appears in Dorothy and the Wizard of Oz. She is depicted as a red hen whose clucking can be understood by Scarecrow and is often seen inside Tin Man's chest compartment.

== See also ==
- Return to Oz
- List of fictional birds
