= Frank M. Stammers =

American actor

- Died: June 27, 1921; New York City, New York, U.S.
- Occupation(s): Theatre director, Choreographer, Playwright, Lyricist, Actor

Frank M. Stammers (died June 27, 1921 in New York City) was a theatre director, choreographer, playwright, lyricist, and actor who directed L. Frank Baum and Louis F. Gottschalk's The Tik-Tok Man of Oz for producer Oliver Morosco in 1913 in Los Angeles and on tour.

He is also noted for his role as Dave Kinney in The Ninety and Nine by Ramsay Morris, and in October 1903 he appeared in Morris and Franklyn Fyles's adaptation of Hallie Erminie Rives's novel, Hearts Courageous in the role of Philip Frenau. He also wrote the book and lyrics as well as directed the Harold Orlob musical comedy about mermaids, Nothing but Love, which played on Broadway in 1919. Other Broadway directing credits include See My Lawyer by Max Marcin (1915), His Little Widows by William Schroeder (music), Rida Johnson Young and William Carey Duncan (book and lyrics); (1917), and It's Up to You [Book by Augustin MacHugh and Douglas Leavitt; Lyrics by Edward Paulton, Harry Clarke and John L. McManus; Music by Manuel Klein (who was originally attached to Tik-Tok Man)] (1921).

With Frank Rainger, he choreographed Morosco's Broadway production, Canary Cottage (book by Morosco and Elmer Blaney Harris, music by Earl Carroll) (1917).

He was theatrical director at Delmar Garden in St. Louis, Missouri, in 1910.

Stammers died of typhoid pneumonia at Roosevelt Hospital and was buried at his summer home in North Brookfield.
