= Polychrome (Oz) =

- Oz character
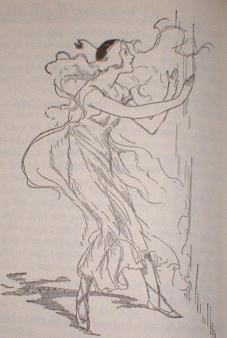
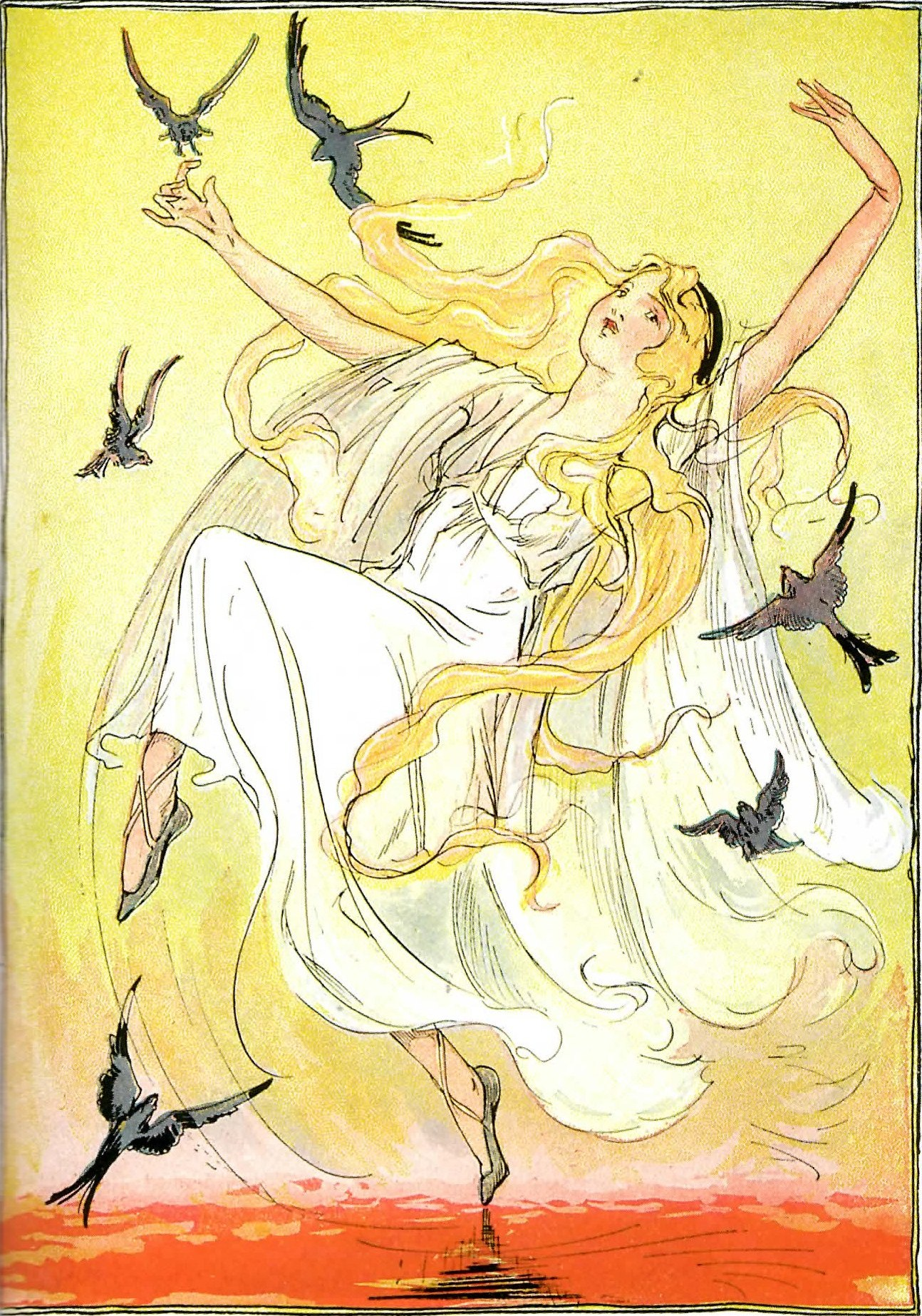
- as illustrated by John R. Neill in The Tin Woodman of Oz (1918)
- First appearance: The Road to Oz (1909)
- Created by: L. Frank Baum

In-universe information
- Nickname: Polly
- Species: Fairy
- Gender: female
- Title: Daughter of the Rainbow
- Family: Rainbow (father), unnamed sisters

Polychrome is a cloud fairy and the youngest daughter of the Rainbow, thus she is a "sky princess". She first appears in The Road to Oz (1909), which is the fifth book of the original fourteen Oz books by American author by L. Frank Baum. She also appears several times in later Oz stories of the classic series and in literature written by authors other than Baum.

== Appearances ==
When Dorothy Gale, her pet dog Toto, the Shaggy Man, and Button-Bright first encounter Polychrome in the fifth chapter of The Road to Oz, she is seen dancing to keep herself warm, after accidentally sliding off her father's rainbow and landing on the surface of the Earth. (Her father withdrew his bow without realizing she had been left behind.) Polychrome is described as:

A little girl, radiant and beautiful, shapely as a fairy and exquisitely dressed.... She was clad in flowing, fluffy robes of soft material that reminded Dorothy of woven cobwebs, only it was colored in soft tintings of violet, rose, topaz, olive, azure, and white, mingled together most harmoniously in stripes which melted one into the other with soft blendings. Her hair was like spun gold and floated around her in a cloud, no strand being fastened or confined by either pin or ornament or ribbon.

In personality she is sweet and ethereal, a archetypical good fairy. She is very sensitive to cold and, while on Earth, often dances to keep warm. Polychrome states that she normally only consumes insubstantial foods such as dewdrops and mist. While on Earth, she can subsist on only minuscule morsels of human food. She is well known in the series for her daintiness and grace, and is considered to be an equal in beauty to Princess Ozma herself.

Polychrome is more a decorative than an active presence in The Road to Oz, but she makes positive contributions in her subsequent appearances in Baum's fictions. In Sky Island (1912), she provides the solution to the central characters' main problem.

In Tik-Tok of Oz (1914), she summons the dragon Quox to rescue the captured Ozites from the Nome King (The Nome King is dazzled by the beautiful fairy and begs her to remain in his underground realm, which she refuses).

In The Tin Woodman of Oz (1918), she rescues the rusted Captain Fyter the Tin Soldier by oiling his joints, just as Dorothy had done for the Tin Woodman in The Wonderful Wizard of Oz (1900), and she uses her magic to let the protagonists fit through a rabbit hole. She also restores Tommy Kwikstep to normal.

== Portrayals ==
Polychrome was played by Dolly Castles in the 1913 stage play, The Tik-Tok Man of Oz by Baum, Louis F. Gottschalk, Victor Schertzinger, and Oliver Morosco. In the play, she sings a duet with Ruggedo titled "When in Trouble Come to Papa".

Polychrome is portrayed by Juanita Hansen in the silent film The Patchwork Girl of Oz (1914), where she briefly appears as the bell-ringer of the Emerald City.

Polychrome has a cameo in the coronation sequence of the 1985 feature film Return to Oz. Though the role is an extra, Allen Eyles's The World of Oz features a production still crediting the role to Cherie Hawkins, who later served for a time on the staff of the theatre department at University of Alaska Anchorage.

Polychrome makes guest appearances in the animated series The Oz Kids and Dorothy and the Wizard of Oz.

== In works by other authors ==
Within the "canonical" Oz books, Polychrome appears in Ruth Plumly Thompson's Grampa in Oz (1924) and The Purple Prince of Oz (1932), John R. Neill's The Wonder City of Oz and Lucky Bucky in Oz, and Eric Shanower's The Giant Garden of Oz (1993, accepted as canon by some sources). Her role in these stories is often that of a deus ex machina who shows up to transport the main characters via Rainbow Bridge.

"Non-canonical" book appearances of Polychrome include Dark Witch Rising: Rainbow's Emissary by Mike LaMontagne, Magician of Oz and its sequels by James C. Wallace II, and Polychrome: A Romantic Fantasy by Ryk E. Spoor.
