= Tik-Tok of Oz =

1914 book by L. Frank Baum

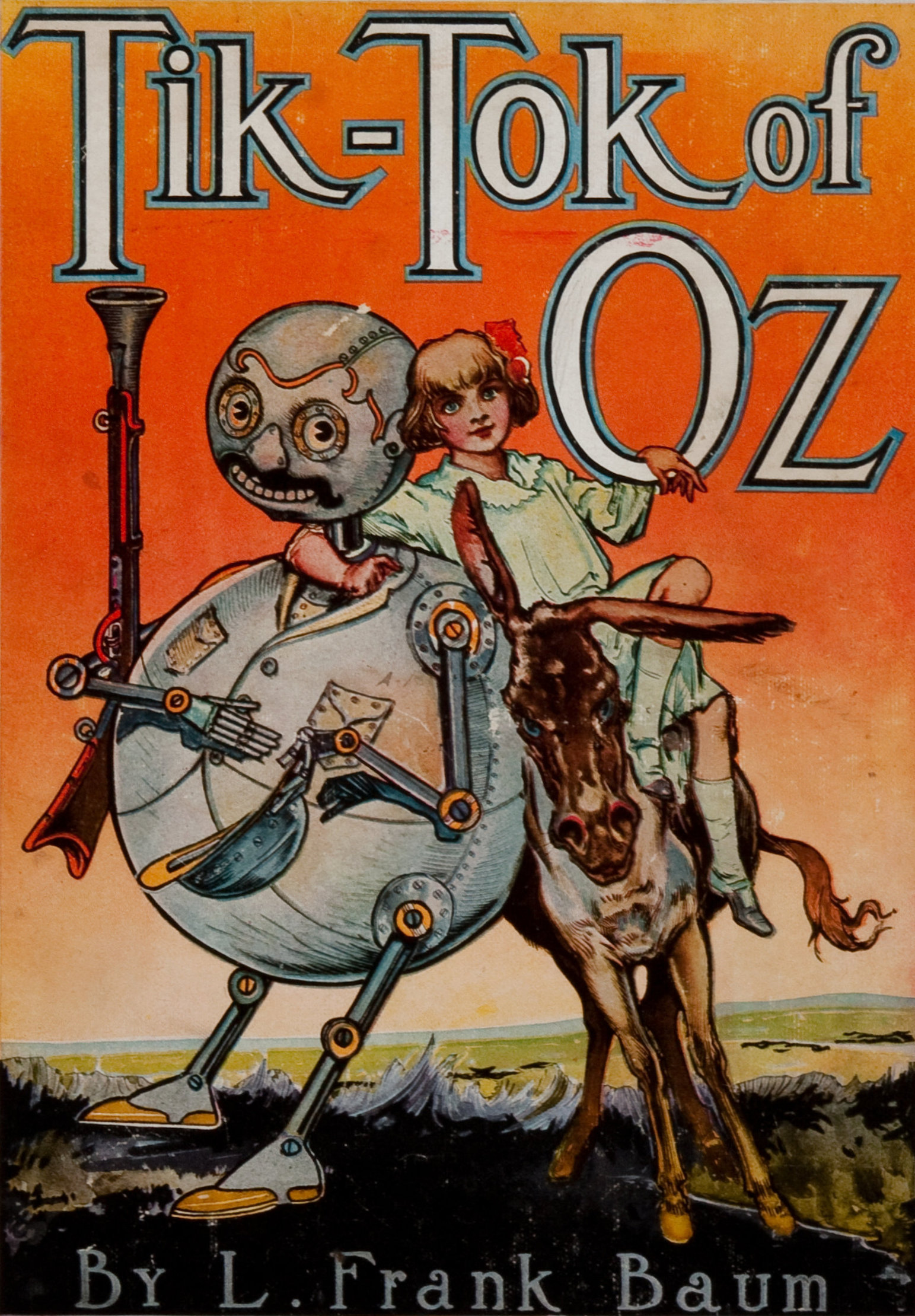
- Cover of Tik-Tok of Oz
- Author: L. Frank Baum
- Illustrator: John R. Neill
- Language: English
- Series: The Oz books
- Genre: Children's novel
- Publisher: Reilly & Britton
- Publication date: 1914
- Publication place: United States
- Media type: Print (hardcover)
- Preceded by: The Patchwork Girl of Oz
- Followed by: The Scarecrow of Oz

Tik-Tok of Oz is the eighth book in the Oz series written by L. Frank Baum, published on June 19, 1914. The book has little to do with Tik-Tok and is primarily the quest of the Shaggy Man (introduced in The Road to Oz) to rescue his brother, and his resulting conflict with the Nome King. The book was based on Baum's play The Tik-Tok Man of Oz, which was produced in Los Angeles in spring 1913. It was followed by The Scarecrow of Oz (1915).

The endpapers of the first edition held maps: one of Oz itself, and one of the continents on which Oz and its neighboring countries belonged. These were the first maps printed of Oz.

== Plot summary ==
Queen Ann Soforth of Oogaboo, a small monarchy separated from the rest of Oz's Winkie Country, sets out to raise an army to conquer Oz.

Betsy Bobbin, a girl who is a year older than Dorothy Gale, and her loyal mule Hank have washed ashore during a storm. They arrive at a large greenhouse that is the domain of the Rose Kingdom, where the roses tell them that no strangers are allowed. Just as the Royal Gardener is about to pass sentence on Betsy and Hank, the Shaggy Man falls through the greenhouse's roof, and charms the Gardener into sparing all of their lives with his Love Magnet. The travelers leave, taking with them the newly plucked Rose Princess Ozga, a cousin of Princess Ozma, the ruler of Oz.

The Shaggy Man relates how Ozma sent him here via the Magic Belt because he wanted to find his brother, who went digging underground in Colorado and disappeared. He surmised that the Nome King, ruler of the underground Nome Kingdom, captured him. They meet up with Polychrome the Rainbow's Daughter, and they rescue Tik-Tok from the well where the Nome King had tossed him. Once Tik-Tok is wound up, he accompanies Betsy, Hank, the Shaggy Man, Ozga, and Polychrome to their chance encounter with Queen Ann and her army. When Queen Ann learns of the riches to be found in the Nome King's underground kingdom, she calms down and accepts the services of Tik-Tok as her new private.

The Nome King is aghast at this group coming toward his underground kingdom. Since no one can be killed in Oz, the Nome King seeks to discourage them, first by taking them through the Rubber Country, and then disposing of them by dropping them through the Hollow Tube, a conduit leading to the other side of the world. There the party enters the jurisdiction of the immortal called Tititi-Hoochoo, the Great Jinjin, who vows to punish the Nome King for using the Hollow Tube. He sends Tik-Tok and the others back with his Instrument of Vengeance, a lackadaisical dragon named Quox.

When Quox bursts through the Nome King's cavern, the Nome King sees the ribbon around Quox's neck and forgets all the magic he ever knew. The Nome King is driven out of his kingdom when Quox releases six eggs from the padlock around his neck. The eggs, poisonous to Nomes, follow the Nome King to the Earth's surface and confine him there.

The new Nome King, the former chief steward Kaliko, vows to help the Shaggy Man find his brother, whom he knows is in the Metal Forest. The Shaggy Man meets his brother in the center of the Forest, but the brother is cursed with a charm of ugliness by the former Nome King. The fairy Polychrome's kiss restores the Shaggy Man's brother to his former self.

There is a banquet of rejoicing in the Nome Kingdom, and the former Nome King earnestly pleads to be let back into the underground lair. Once on the surface again, Polychrome ascends her rainbow and Ozma uses the magic belt to send the citizens of Oogaboo back home. The Shaggy Man only agrees to return when his brother, Betsy, and Hank are allowed to enter Oz too. Betsy decides to stay in Oz forever.

== Commentary ==
In 1913, Baum's long-delayed and heavily-adapted stage version of Ozma of Oz, re-titled The Tik-Tok Man of Oz, was produced in Los Angeles, with moderate success. The music was composed by Louis F. Gottschalk, Baum's favorite composer, who would also be the dedicatee of the Tik-Tok novel a year later. Baum adapted some of the material from the stage production for the novel. As in Ozma of Oz, a shipwreck precipitates the heroine into her adventure, and the quest of the Shaggy Man for his brother, who was named Wiggy in the play, is another attempt to rescue a prisoner of the Nome King. The picking of Ozma is a motif found in Dorothy and the Wizard in Oz.

The book has several continuity errors with earlier books in the series, particularly The Road to Oz. Whereas Polychrome met the Shaggy Man in that book, this point is neglected by Baum in Tik-Tok. Also, whereas the Shaggy Man merely needs to carry the Love Magnet on his person for it to work in The Road to Oz, in this book it is necessary for him to remove it from his pocket and physically show it to those he wishes to love him.

Tik-Tok of Oz was more modestly produced than earlier Oz books, with twelve color plates instead of sixteen. Its first edition sold a little over 14,000 copies — a respectable figure, but 3,000 fewer than The Patchwork Girl of Oz had done the year before. Baum's books were facing stiff new competition — from his own earlier books. The reprint house M. A. Donohue & Co. had purchased the rights to several early Baum works from Bobbs-Merrill, and was marketing cut-rate editions. People were less willing to pay the usual $1.25 for a new Oz book when the original Wizard of Oz was selling for $0.35.

Tik-Tok of Oz also contained the first map of Oz and its neighboring countries, which proved to be a very popular feature. Unfortunately for the principle of consistency, this initial map of Oz was drawn backwards, with the Munchkin Country on the left and the Winkie Country in the right, with the compass rose reversed to keep the Munchkin Country in the east and the Winkie Country in the west. [See: Land of Oz.] Subsequent maps from the publisher "corrected" the compass rose, but not the locations. This may explain why Ruth Plumly Thompson reversed the locations from Baum's -- in her books the Munchkin country is west; and her Winkies East (see for instance Ozoplaning with the Wizard of Oz but also in several other books). James E. Haff and Dick Martin ultimately corrected these in new maps designed for The International Wizard of Oz Club. A squarish map that largely follows Haff and Martin appears in The Dictionary of Imaginary Places. The presence of a "Davy Jones Island" on this map indicates that the inclusion of the character Davy Jones, a wooden whale, as a decoration on the map, was misinterpreted by the book's recartographers, as no such place appears in any Oz books up to that book's publication.

The 1993 novel Queen Ann in Oz is a sequel to Tik-Tok of Oz.

The Oz books
Previous book: The Patchwork Girl of Oz	Tik-Tok of Oz; 1914	Next book: The Scarecrow of Oz
