= Land of Oz =

Fantasy land created by L. Frank Baum

Oz
- Oz books location
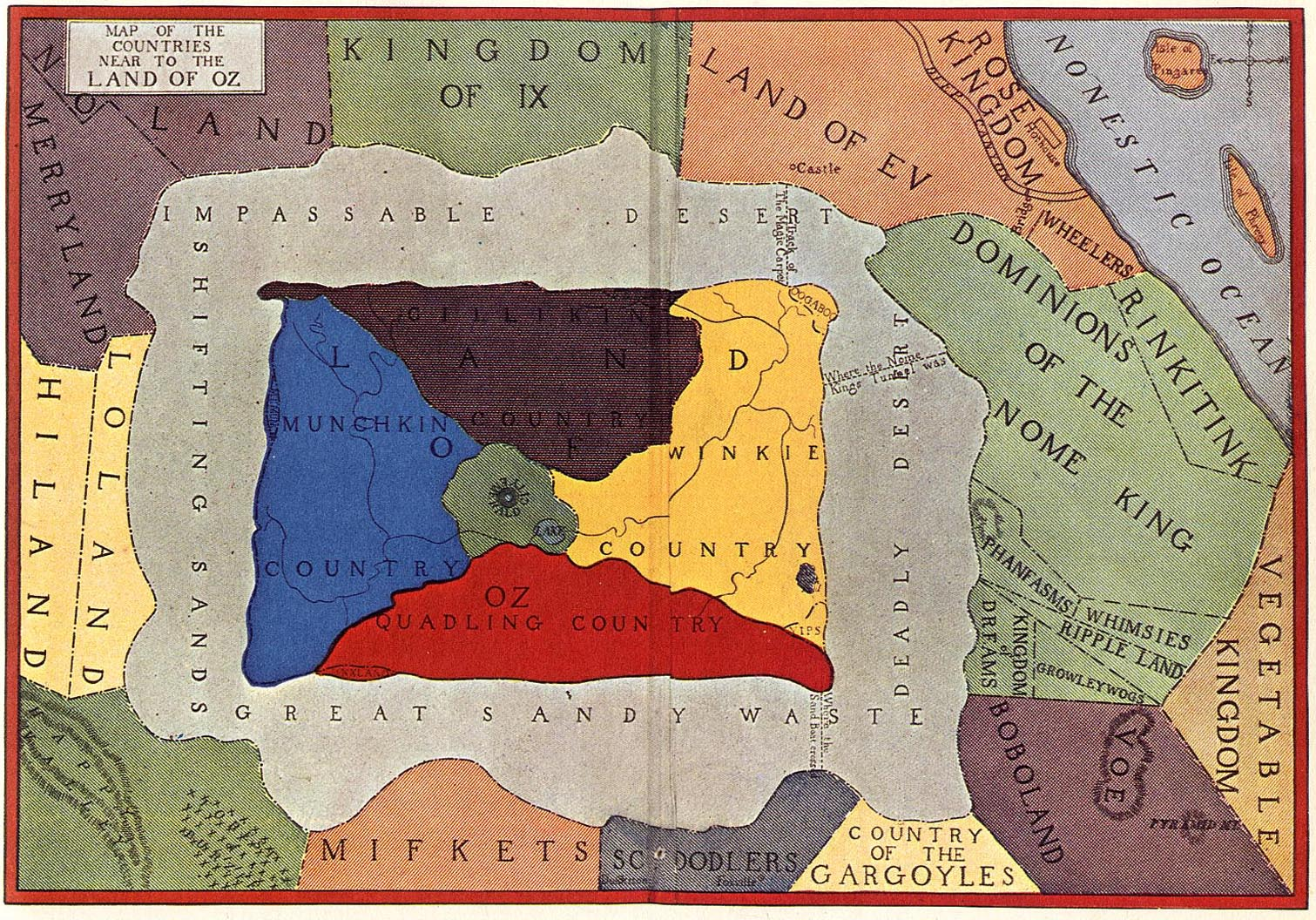
- 1914 map of Oz and its neighboring countries. The regions beyond Oz's surrounding deserts were introduced after the first Oz book.

- Flag of Oz
- First appearance: The Wonderful Wizard of Oz
- Created by: L. Frank Baum
- Genre: Children's fantasy

In-universe information
- Other name: Land of Oz
- Type: Fairy country
- Ruled by: Princess Ozma
- Ethnic groups: Munchkins, Winkies, Quadlings, Gillikins
- Location: Nonestica
- Locations: Emerald City (capital), Munchkin Country, Gillikin Country, Quadling Country, Winkie Country, Yellow brick road, Deadly Desert
- Characters: Dorothy Gale, Toto, Wicked Witch of the East, Good Witch of the North, Wizard of Oz, Princess Ozma, Scarecrow, Tin Woodman, Cowardly Lion, Glinda the Good Witch, Wicked Witch of the West
- Population: 500,000
- Anthem: "The Oz Spangled Banner"
- Language: English
- Currency: none

The Land of Oz is a fantasy world introduced in the 1900 children's novel The Wonderful Wizard of Oz written by L. Frank Baum and illustrated by W. W. Denslow.

Oz consists of four vast quadrants: the Gillikin Country in the north, Quadling Country in the south, Munchkin Country in the east, and Winkie Country in the west. Each province has its own ruler, but the realm itself has always been ruled by a single monarch. According to Dorothy and the Wizard in Oz, the ruler has mostly either been named Oz or Ozma. According to The Marvelous Land of Oz, the current monarch is Princess Ozma.

Baum did not intend for The Wonderful Wizard of Oz to have any sequels, but it achieved greater popularity than any of the other fairylands he created, including the land of Merryland in Baum's children's novel Dot and Tot in Merryland, written a year later. Due to Oz's success, including a 1902 musical adaptation, Baum decided to return to it, in 1904, with The Marvelous Land of Oz. For the next 15 years, he described and expanded upon the land in the Oz Books, a series which introduced many fictional characters and creatures. Baum planned to end the series with The Emerald City of Oz (1910), in which Oz is forever sealed off and rendered invisible to the outside world, but this was not received well by fans, and he quickly abandoned the idea, writing eight more Oz books and even naming himself the "Royal Historian of Oz".

In all, Baum wrote fourteen best-selling novels about Oz and its enchanted inhabitants, as well as a spin-off series of six early readers. After his death in 1919, publisher Reilly & Lee continued to produce annual Oz books, passing on the role of Royal Historian to author Ruth Plumly Thompson, illustrator John R. Neill (who had previously collaborated with Baum on his Oz books), and several other writers. The forty books in Reilly & Lee's Oz series are called "the Famous Forty" by fans and are considered the canonical Oz texts.

Baum characterized Oz as a real place, unlike MGM's 1939 musical movie adaptation, which presents it as a dream of lead character Dorothy Gale. According to the Oz books, it is a hidden fairyland cut off from the rest of the world by the Deadly Desert.

== Characteristics ==
Oz is, in the first book The Wonderful Wizard of Oz, distinguished from Dorothy's native Kansas by not being civilized; this explains why Kansas does not have witches and wizards, while Oz does. In the third book, Ozma of Oz, Oz is described as a "fairy country", new terminology that remained to explain its wonders.

== Geography ==
=== The Land of Oz ===
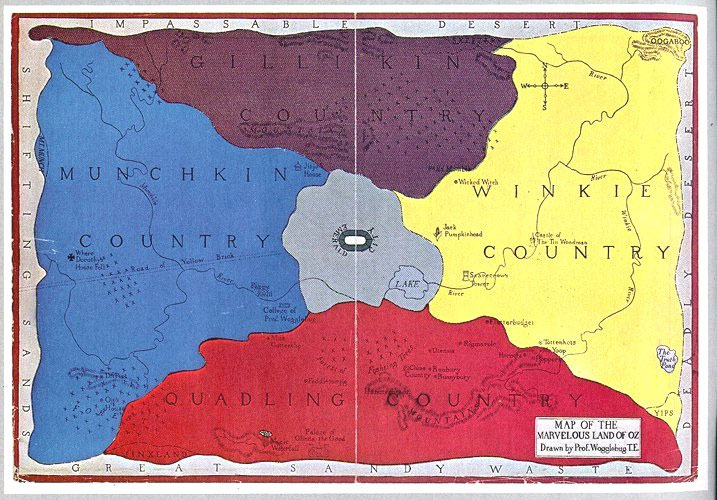
The Land of Oz; this map's compass rose shows East pointing to the right (as is typical in real life), though East pointing to the left, or a mirror image of this map, is regarded as the correct orientation in many publications. For reasons why, see West and East.

Oz is roughly rectangular in shape and divided along the diagonals into four countries: Munchkin Country (but commonly referred to as 'Munchkinland' in adaptations) in the East, Winkie Country in the West, Gillikin Country in the North, and Quadling Country in the South. In the center of Oz, where the diagonals cross, is the fabled Emerald City, capital of the land of Oz and seat to the monarch of Oz, Princess Ozma.

The regions have a color scheme: blue for Munchkins, yellow for Winkies, red for Quadlings, green for the Emerald City, and (in works after the first) purple for the Gillikins, which region was also not named in the first book. This emphasis on color is in contrast with Kansas; Baum, describing it, used "gray" nine times in four paragraphs. In The Wonderful Wizard of Oz, this is merely the favorite color of each quadrant, used for clothing and other man-made objects, and having some influence on their choice of crops, but the basic colors of the world are natural colors. The effect is less consistent in later works. In The Marvelous Land of Oz, the book states that everything in the land of the Gillikins is purple, including the plants and mud, and a character can see that he is leaving when the grass turns from purple to green, but it also describes pumpkins as orange and corn as green in that land. Baum, indeed, never used the color scheme consistently; in many books, he alluded to the colors to orient the characters and readers to their location and then did not refer to it again. His most common technique was to depict the man-made articles and flowers as the color of the country, leaving leaves, grass, and fruit their natural colors.

Most of these regions are settled with prosperous and contented people. However, this naturally is lacking in scope for plot. Numerous pockets throughout the Land of Oz are cut off from the main culture, for geographic or cultural reasons. Many have never heard of Ozma, making it impossible for them to acknowledge her as their rightful queen. These regions are concentrated around the edges of the country and constitute the main settings for books that are set entirely within Oz. The Lost Princess of Oz, for instance, is set entirely in rough country in Winkie Country, between two settled areas. In Glinda of Oz, Ozma speaks of her duty to discover all these stray corners of Oz.

In The Wonderful Wizard of Oz, a yellow brick road leads from the lands of the Munchkins to the Emerald City. Other such roads featured in other works: one from Gillikin Country in The Marvelous Land of Oz and a second one from Munchkin Land in The Patchwork Girl of Oz.

==== Gillikin Country ====
Gillikin Country is the northern part of the Land of Oz. It is the home of the Gillikins. It is distinguished by the color purple worn by most of the local inhabitants as well as the color of their surroundings.

Martin Gardner suggests the name Gillikin may be named after the purple blossoms of the gillyflower. Jerry Griswold summarized Gillikin Country as "a place of mountains and lakes". In his observation of parallels between the land of Oz and the United States of America, he saw this northern part as similar to Michigan, which was familiar to L. Frank Baum from vacations.

In Gregory Maguire's revisionist Oz novels Wicked: The Life and Times of the Wicked Witch of the West and Son of a Witch, the Gillikin Country is simply called 'Gillikin'. It is portrayed as more prosperous and industrially developed than other regions of Oz, and it is the home of Shiz University. Much of both of Edward Einhorn's novels, Paradox in Oz and The Living House of Oz, are set in Gillikin Country. They feature the kingdom of Tonsoria, homes to Princesses Ayala and Talia, and in Absurd City, home of the Parrot-Ox.

==== Quadling Country ====
Quadling Country is the southern part of the Land of Oz. It is the home of the Quadlings and ruled by Glinda. Michael Patrick Hearn suggests the name Quadling means "a small inhabitant of the fourth country". In Gregory Maguire's novel, Quadling country is described as a marshland that is left almost uninhabited after the conquest of the wizard.

==== Munchkin Country ====
Munchkin Country is the eastern part of the Land of Oz. It is the home of the Munchkins. In the story, the novel's protagonist Dorothy Gale, attends a celebration upon her arrival to Oz at the mansion of Boq, who is the friendliest and wealthiest Munchkin man.

Michael Patrick Hearn suggests the name Munchkin may have been inspired by the fabulous Baron Munchausen. He also points out that the 1961 Russian edition derives the name from the verb "to munch". Evan Schwartz suggests a reference to the Münchner Kindl. In The Wonderful Wizard of Oz, the country was called "the land of Munchkins", but it is referred to as "Munchkin Country" in all subsequent Oz books. In the 1939 film The Wizard of Oz, it is called Munchkinland.

==== Winkie Country ====
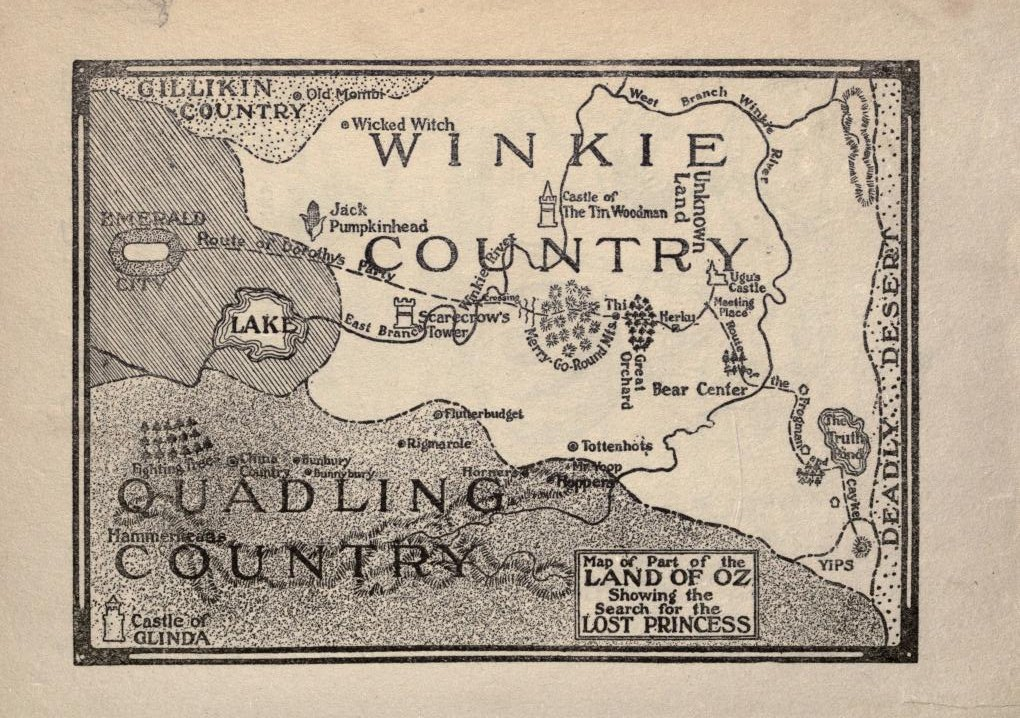
Map of the Winkie Country from The Lost Princess of Oz (1917)

Winkie Country is the western part of the Land of Oz. It is the home of the Winkies. Michael Patrick Hearn suggests the name Winkie means "a little bit of light", referring to the country "where the sun sets".

This quadrant is strictly distinguished by the color yellow. This color is worn by most of the native inhabitants called the Winkies and predominates in the local surroundings. The Winkies are relatively normal in appearance with the exception of their yellow-tinted skin. Tin abounds there and it is said that the Winkies are some of the most skillful tinsmiths in the world. This was the country once ruled by the malevolent Wicked Witch of the West before Dorothy Gale "melted" her with a bucket of water, as narrated in The Wonderful Wizard of Oz. After that, the Winkies asked the Tin Woodman to be their new monarch ruler which he gladly accepted. He now lives in a vast palace made of tin that his loyal subjects built in his honor as a present for their new king.

The most famous depiction of the Winkies is in the 1939 musical film where they appear as the regimental army of the Wicked Witch of the West, marching in formation and chanting repeatedly.

In Gregory Maguire's revisionist Oz novels Wicked: The Life and Times of the Wicked Witch of the West and Son of a Witch, this area is called the Vinkus, and it is revealed that "Winkie" is considered a derogatory term.

=== Deadly Desert ===
Oz is completely surrounded on all four sides by a desert which insulates the citizens of the Land of Oz from discovery and invasion. Although the desert is mundane in the first two books, in the third book, Ozma of Oz (1907), it is described as having life-destroying sands and noxious fumes, features that remain constant for the rest of the series. In the fifth book, The Road to Oz (1909), a sign is posted on the edge of the desert to warn travelers:

ALL PERSONS ARE WARNED NOT TO VENTURE UPON THIS DESERT
For the Deadly Sands Will Turn Any Living Flesh to Dust in an Instant.
Beyond This Barrier is the
LAND OF OZ
But no one can Reach that Beautiful Country because of these Destroying Sands.

The desert is used as a literary device to explain why Oz is essentially cut off from the rest of the world and the surrounding countries of Nonestica. No one in the Oz series is ever seen to die in the desert, but it has nonetheless been breached numerous times by children from the primary world, by the Wizard of Oz himself, and by more sinister characters such as the Nome King, who attempted to conquer Oz. After such an attempt in The Emerald City of Oz (1910), Glinda creates a barrier of invisibility around the Land of Oz to further protect it. This was an effort on Baum's part to end the series, but the insistence of readers meant the continuation of the series and, therefore, the discovery of many ways for people to pass through this barrier as well as over the sands. Despite this continual evasion, the barrier itself remained; nowhere in any Oz book did Baum hint that the inhabitants were even considering removing the magical barrier.

The Deadly Desert is seen in Wicked and its sequel Wicked: For Good, though it is renamed as "The Impassible Desert" due to its vast size and no longer has the life-destroying sands and noxious fumes. Elphaba and Fiyero are seen treking it at the end of the film after leaving Oz following their staged deaths.

==== Notable crossings ====
- In the 1900 novel The Wonderful Wizard of Oz, Dorothy Gale is carried into Oz in her house by a cyclone and back over again by her Silver Shoes, which fall off during her flight and are lost in the desert. Although she commands the Winged Monkeys to carry her home, they are unable to do so because it would take them outside the lands of Oz. The Wizard of Oz originally arrived in Oz by a circus balloon (which he implies functioned by a gas lighter than air, rather than hot air), and years later leaves Oz in a hot-air balloon of his own design.
- In The Marvelous Land of Oz, Tip and his companions fly over it using The Gump who was granted flight with its palm leaf parts. The witch Mombi tries to cross the desert in the form of a griffin while Glinda chases her over the sands.
- In Ozma of Oz, Princess Ozma crosses the desert with her whole court by use of an infinitely unrolling carpet.
- In The Road to Oz, Dorothy Gale, Shaggy Man, Polychrome and Button-Bright cross the desert into Oz by use of a sand ship.
- In The Emerald City of Oz, the Nome King and his allies the Whimsies, the Growleywogs, and the Phanfasms dug a tunnel underneath the desert.
- In The Scarecrow of Oz, Trot, Cap'n Bill, and Button-Bright flew over the desert carried by birds and led by Flipper the Ork.
- In The Magic of Oz, Kiki Aru transformed himself into a bird and flew over the Deadly Desert from the Land of Oz, exploring the various countries of Nonestica.
- In Kabumpo in Oz, a giant Ruggedo hopped right over the Deadly Desert and ran back to his mountain in the Land of Ev after Princess Ozma's palace got stuck in his hair spikes. In the same book, Kabumpo, Peg Amy, Pompadore, and Wag crossed over the Deadly Desert on a runaway country.
- In The Purple Prince of Oz, Polychrome allowed Prince Randy, Kabumpo, and Jinnicky the Red Jinn to ride her rainbow across the Deadly Desert.
- In Handy Mandy in Oz, a geyser beneath Mt. Mern in an unidentified area erupted underneath Handy Mandy sending her and the large boulder she was on over the Deadly Desert where she landed in Munchkin Country.
- In The Silver Princess in Oz, Kabumpo and King Randy were blown across the Deadly Desert by a powerful storm.
- In the 1985 film Return to Oz, Dorothy Gale crosses the edge of the Desert by stepping upon stones. Later, the pack of Wheelers working for Mombi fail to get across the Deadly Desert in pursuit of Dorothy and the Gump, who cross the desert to reach the Nome King's mountain. Four of the Wheelers fall into the desert and are subsequently turned into sand and killed. The remaining Wheelers later return with Princess Mombi and cross the desert through the tunnel that was dug underneath the desert to reach the Nome King's mountain.
- In Dorothy and the Wizard of Oz, the Deadly Desert contains a monster made of sand.

=== West and East ===
The first known map of Oz was a glass slide used in Baum's Fairylogue and Radio-Play traveling show, showing the blue land of the Munchkins in the east and the yellow land of the Winkies in the west. These directions are confirmed by the text of all of Baum's Oz books, especially the first, in which the Wicked Witch of the East rules over the Munchkins, and the Wicked Witch of the West rules over the Winkies.

Like traditional western maps, the Fairylogue and Radio-Play map showed the west on the left and the east on the right. However, the first map of Oz to appear in an Oz book had those directions reversed and the compass rose adjusted accordingly. It is believed that this is a result of Baum copying the map from the wrong side of the glass slide, effectively getting a mirror image of his intended map. When he realized he was copying the slide backward, he reversed the compass rose to make the directions correct. However, an editor at Reilly and Lee reversed the compass rose, thinking he was fixing an error, resulting in further confusion. Most notably, this confused Ruth Plumly Thompson, who frequently reversed directions in her own Oz books as a result.

Another speculation stems from the original conception of Oz, which at first appeared to be situated in an American desert. If Baum thought of the country of the Munchkins as the nearest region to him, it would have been in the east while he lived in Chicago but, when he moved to California, it would have been in the west.

Modern maps of Oz are almost universally drawn with Winkie country on the right (west) and Munchkin Country on the left (east), with an inverted compass rose. Many Oz fans believe this is the correct orientation, perhaps as a result of Glinda's spell, which has the effect of confusing most standard compasses; perhaps resembling its similarity to the world Alice found through the looking glass in which everything was a mirror image, or perhaps just reflecting the alien nature of Oz. In Robert A. Heinlein's 1980 book The Number of the Beast, he posits that Oz is on a retrograde planet, meaning that it spins in the opposite direction of Earth so that the sun seems to rise on one's left as one faces north. March Laumer's The Magic Mirror of Oz attributes the changes to a character named Till Orangespiegel attempting to turn the Land of Oz orange.

=== Location ===
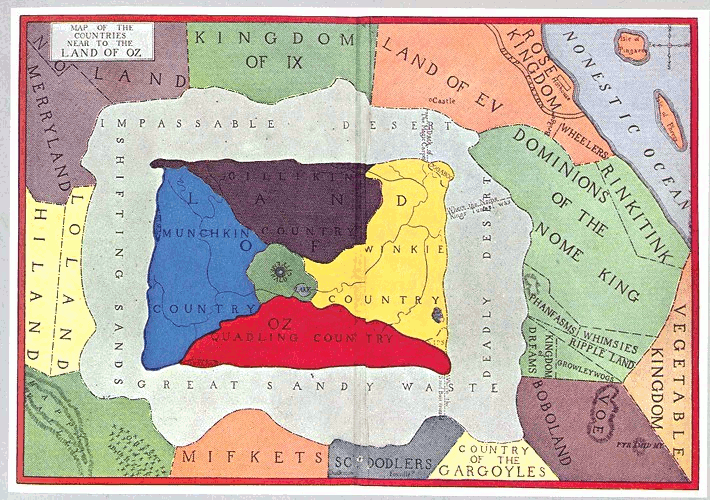
A map of Oz and nearby countries, first published in Tik-Tok of Oz in 1914.

Oz, like all of Baum's fantasy countries, was presented as existing as part of the real world, albeit protected from civilization by natural barriers. Indeed, in the first books, nothing indicated that it was not hidden in the deserts of the United States. It gradually acquired neighboring magical countries, often from works of Baum's that had been independent, as Ix from Queen Zixi of Ix and Mo from The Magical Monarch of Mo. The first of these is Ev, introduced in Ozma of Oz.

In Tik-Tok of Oz (1914), Baum included maps in the endpapers which definitively situated Oz on a continent with its neighboring countries. Oz is the largest country on the continent unofficially known by names proposed by Robert R. Pattrick: Nonestica, for the whole of the countries surrounding Oz; and "Ozeria," for the whole continent. The land also includes the countries of Ev, Ix, and Mo, which has also been known as Phunniland, among others. Nonestica is, according to the map, adjacent to the Nonestic Ocean.

Continent of Imagination, as mapped by John Drury Clark and John Burton Hatcher.

Later maps, such as that drawn by John Drury Clark and John Burton Hatcher, or the map by James E. Haff and Dick Martin, show Oz on a small continent surrounded by an ocean full of islands, and they attempt to reconcile contradictions in the books, such as the east–west orientation of locations. A fair amount of evidence in the books points to this continent as being envisioned as somewhere in the southern Pacific Ocean. At the opening of Ozma of Oz, Dorothy Gale is sailing to Australia with her Uncle Henry when she is washed overboard (in a chicken coop, with Billina the yellow hen), and lands on the shore of Ev—a rare instance in which an outsider reaches the Oz landmass through non-magical (or apparently non-magical) means. Palm trees grow outside the Royal Palace in the Emerald City, and horses are not native to Oz, both points of consistency with a South-Pacific location; illustrations and descriptions of round-shaped and domed Ozite houses suggest a non-Western architecture. Conversely, Oz has technological, architectural, and urban elements typical of Europe and North America around the turn of the twentieth century; but this may involve cultural input from unusual external sources (see History below).

An argument against the South Pacific is that the seasons in Oz are shown as the same seasons in the United States at the same time. In addition, in The Wishing Horse of Oz, Pigasus follows the North Star when he flies to Thunder Mountain, which could only be done in the Northern Hemisphere. Ruth Plumly Thompson asserts in her first Oz book, The Royal Book of Oz, that the language of Oz is English, which also suggests European or American influence.

=== Inspiration ===
Literary scholar Michael Riley posited that Baum's creation of the Emerald City may have been inspired by the White City of the World Columbian Exposition, which he visited frequently. Riley drew parallels between the White City's construction, which took less than a year, with the quick construction of the Emerald City in the first book.

Schematically, Oz is much like the United States, with the Emerald City taking the place of Chicago: to the East, mixed forest and farmland; to the West, treeless plains and fields of wheat; to the South, warmth and lush growth, and red earth.

Ruth Plumly Thompson took a different direction with her Oz books, introducing European elements such as the title character of The Yellow Knight of Oz, a knight straight out of Arthurian Legend.

Historian Henry Littlefield proposed that The Wonderful Wizard of Oz is an allegory on the Election of 1896. Under this interpretation, the diagonal design of the land of Oz in the engravings for the Oz books is meant to symbolize William Jennings Bryan's Cross of Gold.

== Inhabitants ==
=== Gillikins ===
The Gillikins are a race of people that live in Gillikin Country. They mostly wear purple and have purple in their landscapes.

=== Quadlings ===
The Quadlings are a race of people that live in Quadling Country. They mostly wear red and have red in their landscapes.

=== Munchkins ===
The Munchkins are a race of short people that live in Munchkin Country. They mostly wear blue and have blue in their landscapes.

=== Winkies ===
The Winkies are a race of people that live in Winkie Country. They mostly wear yellow and have yellow in their landscapes.

=== Witches and wizards ===
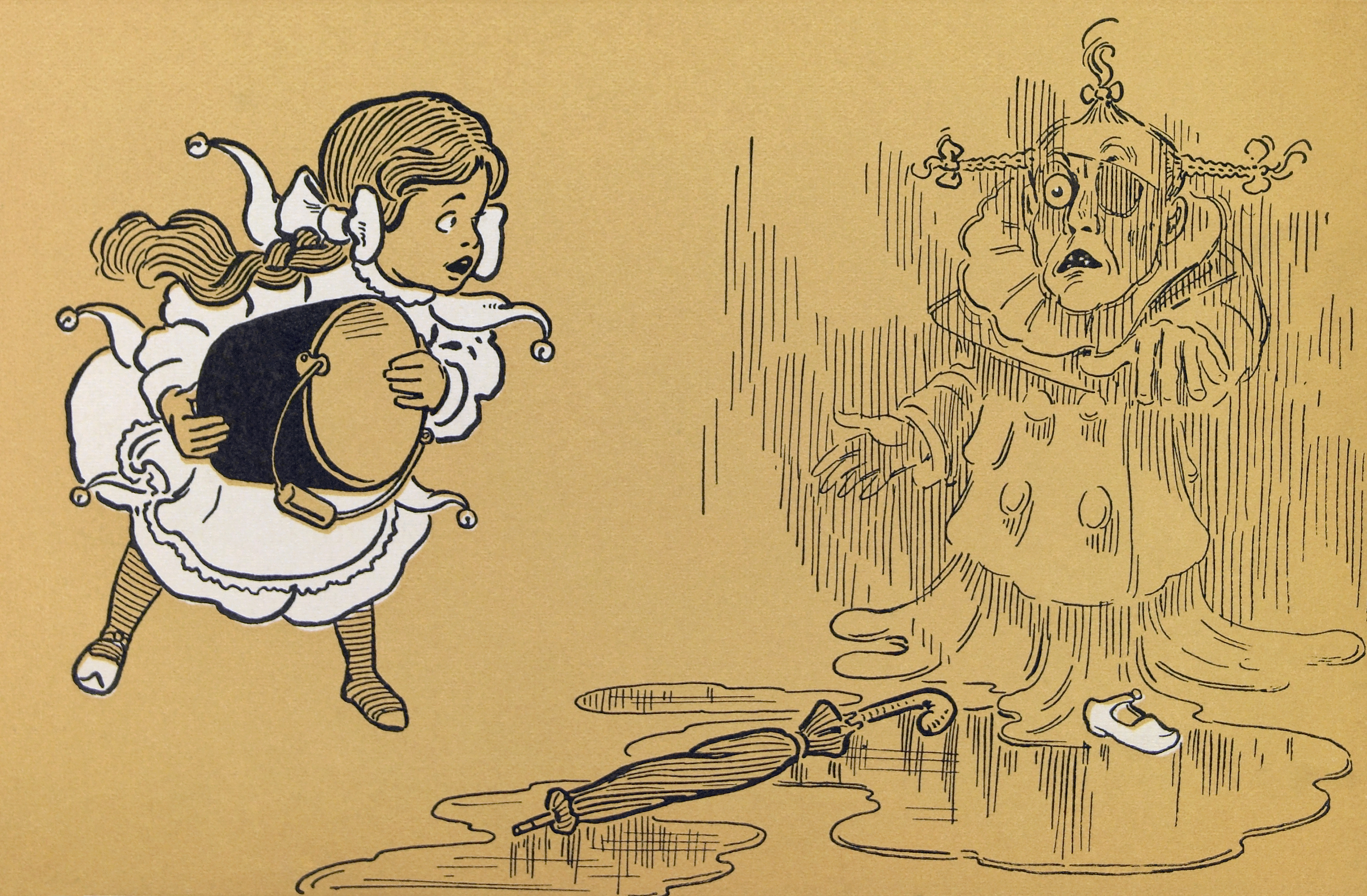
The Wicked Witch of the West melts, from the William Wallace Denslow illustration in the first edition of The Wonderful Wizard of Oz (1900)

At the time of The Wonderful Wizard of Oz, the lands in the North, South, East, and West of Oz are each ruled by a Witch. The Witches of the North and South are good, while the Witches of the East and West are wicked. Glinda (the Good Witch of the South) is later revealed to be the most powerful of the four, although later Oz books reveal that the Wicked Witch of the West was so powerful, even Glinda feared her. After Dorothy's house crushes the Wicked Witch of the East, thereby liberating the Munchkins from bondage, the Good Witch of the North tells Dorothy that she (the Witch of the North) is not as powerful as the Wicked Witch of the East had been, or she would have freed the Munchkins herself.

During the first scene in Oz in The Wonderful Wizard of Oz, the Good Witch of the North (Locasta or Tattypoo) explains to Dorothy that Oz still has witches and wizards, not being civilized, and goes on to explain that witches and wizards can be both good and evil, unlike the evil witches that Dorothy had been told of. That book contained only the four witches (besides the humbug wizard), but, despite Ozma's prohibition on magic, many more magicians feature in later works.

White is the traditional color of witches in Oz. The Good Witch of the North wears a pointed white hat and a white gown decorated with stars, while Glinda, the Good Witch of the South (called a "sorceress" in later books), wears a pure white dress. Dorothy is taken for a witch not only because she had killed the Wicked Witch of the East, but because her dress is blue and white checked.

Ozma, once on the throne, prohibits the use of magic by anyone other than Glinda the Good, the Wizard of Oz, and herself – as, earlier, the Good Witch of the North had prohibited magic by any other witch in her domains. The illicit use of magic is a frequent feature of villains in later works in the series, appearing in The Scarecrow of Oz, Rinkitink in Oz, The Lost Princess of Oz, The Tin Woodman of Oz, and The Magic of Oz.

=== Animals ===
There are different kinds of animals living in Oz. According to Baum, all animals in Oz have the ability to speak because it is a "fairy" kingdom. When asked by his readers why Dorothy's dog Toto did not speak, Baum insisted that he had the ability to, but did not choose to speak. Toto finally does so in Tik-Tok of Oz.

Among the many animals in Oz are:

- A-B-Sea Serpent – A 200-foot-long (61 m) sea serpent that is composed of alphabet blocks.
- Chiss – An evil porcupine spirit that can launch his quills.
- Comfortable Camel – A bactrian camel from outside of the Land of Oz who found his way into the country along with the Doubtful Dromedary and they joined Dorothy Gale's party to find the Scarecrow. He almost always feels comfortable during his eventful journey.
- Cowardly Lion – The Cowardly Lion is one of Dorothy Gale's friends.
- Crab – A crab ended up in an argument with a Zebra to determine if the world had more water, or more land.
- Doubtful Dromedary – A dromedary from outside of the Land of Oz who along with the Comfortable Camel found their way into the country and they joined Dorothy Gale's party to find the Scarecrow. He doubts nearly everything that anyone says.
- Dragons – Dragons are the toughest creatures in the Land of Oz and its neighboring countries. The ones in Gillikin Country live underground and are allowed to come out once every 100 years in search of food.
- Field Mice – The Tin Man once saved the Queen of the Field Mice from a wildcat. Her kind later help Dorothy and her friends get out of a deadly poppy field. The mice also reappear in the Marvelous Land of Oz to help the Scarecrow on his quest to reclaim his throne from General Jinjur, by hiding inside his clothes and jumping out to scare Jinjur and her guards.
- Foolish Owl – The Foolish Owl lives in Munchkin Country. She and the Wise Donkey are public advisers.
- Giant Purple Spiders – A race of spiders in Gillikin Country that catch travelers in their webs and make them their servants.
- Glass Cat – A glass sculpture brought to life by the Powder of Life.
- Gump – Gumps are common creatures in the Land of Oz. They are elk-like creatures with wide-spreading antlers, caprine whiskers, and a turned-up nose.
- Hippocampus – A race of half-horse half-fish aquatic creatures that live in Lake Orizon within Munchkin Country. The lake monster Quiberon once ate them into extinction. After Quiberon was turned to stone by the Wizard of Oz, he used his magic to reconstitute the bones of the Hippocampuses, causing their species to live once more.
- Hip-po-gy-raf – A Hip-po-gy-raf lives in Munchkin Country west of Mount Munch. It appears to be a combination of a hippopotamus and a giraffe.
- Hungry Tiger – The Hungry Tiger is the Cowardly Lion's best friend.
- Jackdaws – A bunch of Jackdaws live in Quadling Country.
- Kabumpo – The elegant elephant of Pumperdink.
- Kalidahs – The Kalidahs have the head and back legs of a tiger and the arms, torso, and feet of a bear. Their claws are known to rip a lion in half.
- Kangaroo – A mittens-wearing kangaroo lives near the village of Fuddlecumjig.
- Lonesome Duck – The Lonesome Duck is the only duck in the Land of Oz.
- Orks – Orks are unusual flying animals that have the blended characteristics of a common ostrich and a parrot.
- Rak – A terrible beast with a horrible appetite and a bad disposition. It is said to be bigger than 100 men and can eat any living thing.
- Rattlesnake – A rattlesnake serves as a companion of the A-B-Sea Serpent.
- Squirrel King – The King of the Squirrels that live in Winkie Country.
- Stork – A stork once helped Dorothy and her companions rescue Scarecrow.
- Unicorns – A group of unicorns that live at Unicorners within Munchkin Country.
- Winged Monkeys – Monkeys with bird wings. They obey the owner of the Golden Cap that summons them three times.
- Wise Donkey – The Wise Donkey was a former citizen of the Land of Mo who often advised the King of Mo. He now lives in Munchkin Country with the Foolish Owl.
- Zebra – A Zebra ended up in an argument with a Crab to determine if there was either more water in the world or more land.

=== Other races ===
A multitude of other races populate the land of Oz, many of which only appear once. These races include:

- Bun People of Bunbury – made of baked goods like breads, buns, cakes, and muffins of all varieties.
- Bunnies of Bunnybury – civilized rabbits.
- China People – beings made of porcelain china from Quadling Country.
- Cuttenclips – living paper dolls from Quadling Country.
- Dicks – topsy-turvy inhabitants of Dicksy Land.
- Equinots – centaurs.
- Flatheads – flat-headed humans who carry their brains in cans.
- Flutterbudgets – people who entertain foolish fears and spend time worrying over nothing.
- Fuddles – anthropomorphic jigsaw puzzles from Fuddlecumjig.
- Hammerheads – armless folks with extensible necks and hard heads.
- Hoopers – 10 ft. tall humanoids from the Purple Forest of Gillikin Country who roll into hoops by grabbing their toes with their hands.
- Hoppers – one-legged people living inside a mountain in Quadling Country.
- Horners – strange one-horned people living inside a mountain in Quadling Country.
- Hyups – subspecies of Munchkins that live on Mount Munch.
- Loons – living balloon people from Loonville.
- Magical Mimics – evil shape-shifting creatures that are a type of Erb living on Mount Illuso.
- Middlings - large mud creatures with dry grass hair from beneath the surface of Munchkin Country.
- Rigmaroles – people that make long deliberate speeches which make use of many words.
- Scares – grotesque beings that reside in Scare City within Quadling Country.
- Scooters – aquatic people living in the Gillikin River, with long boat-like feet and sails growing from their wrists to their ribs.
- Skeezers – anatomically normal humans who are often in conflicts with the Flatheads.
- Thists – creatures with diamond-shaped heads and heart-shaped bodies from Thi.
- Tottenhots – small mischievous people who live on the borders of Quadling Country and Winkie Country.
- Utensians – living utensils from Utensia in Quadling Country.
- Yips – small community of people that resemble the Hyups.

Many other strange races are often found living in the wilderness of Oz. Despite the rulership of Ozma, many of the communities live autonomously. Oz has great tolerance for eccentricity and oddness.

Many characters in Oz are animated objects. Such figures as the Glass Cat, the Scarecrow, Jack Pumpkinhead, the Sawhorse, and others are common. Entire regions are the homes of such animated beings. The Dainty China Country is entirely filled with creatures made of china, who would freeze into figurines if removed. The China Princess lives in fear of breaking because she would never be as pretty again, even if repaired.

Many other characters are highly individual, even unique members of a species. Many such people from the outer worlds find refuge in Oz, which is highly tolerant of eccentricity.

== History ==
=== Prehistory ===
The history of Oz before The Wonderful Wizard of Oz (often called the prehistory of Oz as it takes place before Baum's "histories") is often the subject of dispute, as Baum himself gave conflicting accounts. In The Wonderful Wizard of Oz, the title character recounts that he was a ventriloquist and a circus balloonist from Omaha. During one flight, the rope for his parachute vent became tangled, preventing him from descending until the next morning. Oz awoke to find that he was floating over a strange land. When he landed, the people thought that Oz was a great wizard because of his ability to fly. He did not disabuse them of this notion and, with his new power over them, he had them build a city with a palace in the center of Oz. He also ordered them to wear green glasses so it would appear to be made entirely of emeralds. However, in the later Oz books, the city is depicted as actually being made of emerald or other green materials. The Wizard was a young man when he first arrived in Oz and grew old while he was there. Afraid of the Wicked Witches of the West and the East, who, unlike him, could do real magic, the Wizard hid away in a room of his palace and refused to see visitors. He lived in this way until the arrival of Dorothy in the first book.

In The Marvelous Land of Oz the prehistory was changed slightly. Glinda, the Good Witch of the South, reveals that the Wizard usurped the previous king of Oz Pastoria and hid away his daughter Ozma. This was Baum's reaction to the popular 1903 Broadway extravaganza Baum adapted from his book, The Wonderful Wizard of Oz, in which the Wizard took the role of the main antagonist and the Wicked Witch of the West was left out.

The Wizard, however, had been more popular with his readers than he thought. In Ozma of Oz, he omitted any mention of the Wizard's having usurped the throne of Ozma's father, but the largest changes occurred in the next book.

In the preface to Dorothy and the Wizard in Oz, Baum remarks that the Wizard had turned out to be a popular character with the children who had read the first book; as such, he brought the Wizard back. During it, the Wizard relates yet another account of his history in Oz, telling Ozma that his birth name was Oscar Zoroaster Phadrig Isaac Norman Henkle Emmanuel Ambroise Diggs, which, being a very long and cumbersome name and, as his other initials spelled out "PINHEAD," he preferred to leave just as O.Z. The balloon part of his story was unchanged, except for the detail added by Ozma, that the people probably saw his initials on his balloon and took them as a message that he was to be their king. She relates that the country was already named Oz (a word which in their language means "great and good") and that it was typical for the rulers to have names that are variations of Oz (King Pastoria being a notable exception to this rule).

Ozma elaborates further, saying that there were once four Wicked Witches in Oz, who leagued together to depose the King, but the Wicked Witches of the North and South were defeated by Good Witches before the Wizard arrived in Oz. According to this version, the King at the time was Ozma's grandfather. This version of prehistory restores the Wizard's reputation, but adds the awkwardness of both Ozma and her father having been born in captivity.

In The Tin Woodman of Oz Baum writes how Oz came to be a fairyland:

Oz was not always a fairyland, I am told. Once it was much like other lands, except it was shut in by a dreadful desert of sandy wastes that lay all around it, thus preventing its people from all contact with the rest of the world. Seeing this isolation, the fairy band of Queen Lurline, passing over Oz while on a journey, enchanted the country and so made it a Fairyland. And Queen Lurline left one of her fairies to rule this enchanted Land of Oz, and then passed on and forgot all about it.

Thenceforward, no one in Oz would ever age, get sick, or die. After becoming a fairyland, Oz harbored many Witches, Magicians, and Sorcerers until the time when Ozma made magic illegal without a permit. In yet another inconsistency, it is implied that Ozma was the fairy left behind by Queen Lurline to rule the country, contradicting the story where she was Pastoria's daughter. This is later confirmed in Glinda of Oz:

"If you are really Princess Ozma of Oz," the Flathead said, "you are one of that band of fairies who, under Queen Lurline, made all Oz a Fairyland. I have heard that Lurline left one of her own fairies to rule Oz, and gave the fairy the name of Ozma."

While this explains why no one dies or ages, and nevertheless there are people of different ages in Oz, it is completely inconsistent with the earlier versions of the prehistory.

Maguire, author of Wicked addresses this inconsistency by saying that the people of Oz believe that Ozma is reincarnated—that her spirit was left behind by Lurline, but her body is reborn to different mortal queens.

In Jack Snow's The Magical Mimics in Oz, the prehistory story is retold. This version relates that Ozma was given to the king of Oz as an adoptive daughter, for he was old and had no children.

In the Magic Land stories of Alexander Melentyevich Volkov, the prehistory is quite different. The land was created 6,000–7,000 years ago by a wizard named Hurricap, who was tired of people coming to him with requests, so he decided to find a place without them annoying him. He found a remote land and separated it from the rest of the world, along with putting the enchantments of eternal spring and talking animals (Volkov's version doesn't include any forms of immortality). However, he failed to notice that the land already contained people (since he was a giant, already suffering from nearsightedness in his advanced age, and the people in the Magic Land were much shorter than in other places), but, upon discovering the fact, decided that removing the enchantments would be unnecessary. Instead, he ordered the people to keep away from his castle. After that, the notable events included a conquest attempt by a sorceress named Arachna (Gurrikap was still alive and put her in an enchanted sleep for 5,000 years. Her awakening formed the story for the fifth book in Volkov's series), an unsuccessful coup by a prince named Bofaro to overthrow his father about 1,000 years ago (He and his accomplices were banished to a cave and became the Magic Land's main source of metal and gems, an analog to the Nomes), and the arrival of the Four Witches (which only occurred about 500 years ago in this continuity).

=== History through the first six books ===
Eventually, Dorothy Gale and her whole house are blown into Oz from Kansas by a tornado. When the house lands, it crushes the Wicked Witch of the East, ruler of the Munchkins. In an attempt to get back to her home, she journeys to the Emerald City. Along the way, she meets the Tin Woodman, the Cowardly Lion, and the Scarecrow, all of whom accompany her. Once there, they become the first people to gain an audience with the Wizard since he went into seclusion, although he disguises himself because Dorothy now has the Wicked Witch of the East's magic silver shoes, and he is afraid of her. The Wizard sends Dorothy and her party to destroy the Wicked Witch of the West and in exchange promises to grant her request to be sent home. Surprisingly, Dorothy "destroys" the Witch by throwing a pail of water on her, causing her to melt. Defeated, the Wizard reveals to the group that he is in fact not a real wizard and has no magical powers, but he promises to grant Dorothy's wish and take her home himself in his balloon. He leaves the Scarecrow in his place to rule Oz.

Finally, it is discovered that the wizard had given the daughter of the last king of Oz, Princess Ozma, to the old witch Mombi to have her hidden away. Mombi had turned Ozma into a boy named Tip, whom she raised. When all of this is revealed Tip is turned back into Ozma and takes her rightful place as the benevolent ruler of all of Oz. Ozma successfully wards off several attempts by various armies to overthrow her. To prevent any upheaval of her rule over Oz, she outlaws the practice of all magic in Oz except by herself, the returned and reformed wizard, and by Glinda, and she has Glinda make all of Oz invisible to outsiders. Ozma remains the ruler of Oz for the entire series.

The Royal flag of Oz, as described in Dorothy and the Wizard in Oz

== Economy and politics ==
Some political analysts have claimed that Oz is a thinly disguised socialist utopia, though some Baum scholars disagree. Advocates of this theory support it using this quotation from The Emerald City of Oz:

There were no poor people in the land of Oz because there was no such thing as money, and all property of every sort belonged to the Ruler. Each person was given freely by his neighbors whatever he required for his use, which is as much as anyone may reasonably desire. Every one worked half the time and played half the time, and the people enjoyed the work as much as they did the play because it is good to be occupied and to have something to do. There were no cruel overseers set to watch them, and no one to rebuke them or to find fault with them. So each one was proud to do all he could for his friends and neighbors and was glad when they would accept the things he produced.

This is a revision of the original society: in the first two books, the people of Oz lived in a money-based economy. For instance, the people of the Emerald City use "green pennies" as coinage. Money was not abolished in the course of the series, but excised from the conception of Oz. Indeed, in The Magic of Oz, a character from Oz gets into trouble when he goes to Ev because he was unaware of the concept of money. This decision to remove money from Oz may reflect Baum's own financial difficulties in the times when he was writing these books.

Since Oz is ruled by a monarch, benevolent though she may be, Oz is closer in nature to an absolute monarchy than a communist or Marxist state. When she was first introduced, Ozma was the monarch specifically of the Emerald City, but in the description of Ozma of Oz, Oz is presented as a federal state, rather like the German Empire, in monarchies rather than republics: having an overall ruler in Ozma, and individual kings and queens of smaller portions.

The society grew steadily more utopian, in that its peace and prosperity were organized. However, from the first book, it was a stupendously wealthy country; this is in contrast to Kansas's crop failures, droughts, and mortgages, just as it also is colorful to contrast with Kansas's gray. On the other hand, despite the presence of the Emerald City, Oz is an agrarian country, similar to Kansas; the story has been interpreted as a populist parable, and it certainly contains many populist themes.

In The Wonder City of Oz, Princess Ozma (called "Queen Ozma" in this book) is seen running for election ("ozlection") to her office as a ruler against Jenny Jump, a half-fairy newcomer from New Jersey. However, this book was not written by Baum, but by John R. Neill, Baum's second successor. Further, the concept of the "ozlection" was not in Neill's manuscript for the book but was added by an editor at Reilly and Lee, the publisher.

At times the rulers of Oz's territories have grander titles than would normally be customary, but this is done mostly for the satisfaction of the incumbents. The ruler of the Winkie Country is the Emperor, the Tin Woodman. The ruler of the Quadling Country is Glinda the Good. The Munchkin Country is ruled by a king, later identified as Cheeriobed, who is revealed to be married to the Good Witch of the North, who, a spell broken, abdicates leadership of the Gillikin Country to Joe King and Queen Hyacinth of Up Town.

The Royal Flag of Oz is based on the map of the Land of Oz; the four colors represent the four countries, and the green star represents the Emerald City.

== Defense ==
Oz is mostly a peaceful land and the idea of subversion is largely unknown to its people. Most military positions are only formal. This has caused many problems, such as in The Marvelous Land of Oz when the Emerald City (which was only guarded by an elderly doorman and one soldier who was the entire Army of Oz at the time) was easily conquered by the Army of Revolt led by General Jinjur. This army was in turn overwhelmed by another army of girls led by Glinda.

Security of Oz is mostly maintained by magic such as Glinda's spell making Oz completely invisible. Oz also has a natural barrier in the form of a desert that surrounds the land: anyone who touches the desert turns to sand. The Nome King has tried to conquer Oz on several occasions. A nominal army once existed, but it had an extremely large officers/privates ratio; other than its commander the Tin Woodman and one private, the portion of it seen in Ozma of Oz was composed entirely of cowardly officers. At the end of the book, it was said that there are three privates all in all, and it is unknown how many—if any—officers were left at home during Ozma's travel to Ev. The private seen in the book named Omby Amby, is later promoted to Captain-General.

In the book The Emerald City of Oz, there are two towns called Rigmarole Town and Flutterbudgets that are the defensive settlements of Oz.

In the movie Return to Oz, the mechanical man Tik-Tok is the entire Royal Army of Oz.

Attempts by outsiders to conquer the Land of Oz are frequent, particularly in the Oz books by Ruth Plumly Thompson. But these attempts are always successfully thwarted in the end, usually by Ozma or by forces sympathetic to her.

== Characters ==
Recurring characters in the classic Oz series include:

- Dorothy Gale – A heroic little orphan girl from Kansas. In later Oz books, she eventually moves to Oz permanently after visiting the land several times and having several adventures there. Dorothy ultimately becomes best friends with Princess Ozma who proclaims her an official princess of Oz.
- Toto – Dorothy's little black dog whom she loves dearly. Toto is a sidekick companion, loyally following his mistress Dorothy on most of her adventures. It is revealed in "Tik-Tok of Oz" that even though Toto is not a fairy dog, he can still talk in Oz, he just chooses not to.
- Princess Ozma – The long-lost child Queen and rightful ruler of Oz. She is the only child of Oz's deceased mortal king, Pastoria, who ruled before the Wizard arrived. She is established upon the throne as the true heir shortly after The Wonderful Wizard of Oz takes place.
- Uncle Henry – Dorothy's uncle who is a Kansas farmer and the husband of Aunt Em. He ultimately moves to Oz with Dorothy and Aunt Em when the bank forecloses on his farm.
- Aunt Em – Dorothy's aunt and the wife of uncle Henry. She ultimately moves to Oz with Dorothy and uncle Henry.
- The Good Witch of the North – The elderly ruler of the northern Gillikins. She is known by Locasta Tattypoo and became the ruler of the Gillikin Country after she overthrew Mombi, the Wicked Witch of the North. She was also the first witch Dorothy encountered upon her first arrival in Oz in The Wonderful Wizard of Oz.
- The Scarecrow – A living stuffed man of straw who was made in Oz's eastern quadrant called Munchkin Country. He is also a good friend of Dorothy. At the end of The Wonderful Wizard of Oz he became the King of Oz and ruled its imperial capital called the Emerald City after the Wizard left. However, he gladly relinquished the title when Ozma was found.
- The Tin Woodman (a.k.a. Nick Chopper) – An enchanted woodsman made entirely out of tin and is a good friend of Dorothy. He was a Munchkin but is the current Emperor of the western Winkies and lives in a tin castle. He became the official ruler of the Winkie Country after the Wicked Witch of the West was destroyed by Dorothy in The Wonderful Wizard of Oz.
- The Cowardly Lion – The talking lion who is a good friend of Dorothy. At the end of The Wonderful Wizard of Oz, he became the King of the Beasts and overcame his cowardly ways. In later Oz books, he becomes best friends with the Hungry Tiger; together they rule Oz's Animal Kingdom and are the royal chariot pullers for Princess Ozma.
- The Wizard (Oscar Diggs) – The former ruler of Oz and the Emerald City before the Scarecrow and Princess Ozma. A skilled circus entertainer and ventriloquist from Omaha, Nebraska, he used his magic tricks to create illusions that made it appear as if he had real powers. Once a humbug, he is now a real wizard after being trained by both Ozma and Glinda, who successfully taught him how to perform honest magic.
- Glinda – The beautiful and wise Good Witch of the South who rules the southern Quadlings in a ruby palace. She became the benevolent sorceress of the Quadling Country after she vanquished the Wicked Witch of the South (although the classic MGM musical movie of 1939 portrays her as the Good Witch of the North).
- Guardian of the Gates – The friendly gatekeeper responsible for adorning the visitors who wish to enter Oz's capital with the green-tinted spectacles. He is described as being a very jolly and short man who wears fancy green clothing and has green-tinted skin.
- Soldier with the Green Whiskers – The Captain-General of the Royal Army of Oz who guards the main entrance of the royal palace in the Emerald City. His real name is Omby Amby Wantowin Battles. He is a very tall man who has a very long green beard.
- Jellia Jamb – The young maid who works in the Emerald City's royal palace. She is also known as the "pretty green girl", with pretty green eyes and pretty green hair. Jellia becomes Ozma and Dorothy's favorite servant out of the city's staff administration.
- Jack Pumpkinhead – An enchanted man made out of wooden branches with a carved jack-o-lantern pumpkin for a head. Jack was brought to life with the magic "Powder of Life" potion.
- The Sawhorse – An animated sawhorse who becomes a steed of sorts for Princess Ozma and her friends. He was brought to life with the "Powder of Life".
- H. M. Woggle-Bug, T.E. – An intelligent insect who was magnified into a human-sized bug.
- Jinjur – A former General of the all-female Army of Revolt.
- Billina – A yellow hen and good friend of Dorothy. Upon arriving in Oz, Billina becomes Queen of the chickens.
- Tik-Tok – A mechanical and super-intelligent clockwork robot (one of the first robots in literature).
- The Hungry Tiger – The Cowardly Lion's closest companion besides the Scarecrow and Tin Woodman.
- The Shaggy Man – A homeless but friendly man from "the real world". He ends up living in Oz permanently.
- Button-Bright – A lost little boy of only four- or five-years-old. He is from a wealthy family in Philadelphia but has many adventures in Oz and its neighboring kingdoms.
- Eureka – Dorothy's pink and purple kitten.
- The Patchwork Girl (a.k.a. "Scraps") – A life-size living doll made entirely of a colorful patchwork quilt. She was brought to life with the magic "Powder of Life" potion by a young Munchkin boy named Ojo. Scraps also becomes the love interest of the Scarecrow.
- Ojo – A young boy of Munchkin descent.
- Betsy Bobbin – A girl a year older than Dorothy from Oklahoma who comes to Oz with a talking mule named Hank after being shipwrecked.
- Polychrome – A colorful and ethereal sky fairy and the youngest daughter of the Rainbow.
- Trot – A girl who comes to Oz by accident and who is a year younger than Dorothy.
- Cap'n Bill – An ex-sailor with a wooden leg who visits Oz and is friends with Trot.
- Kabumpo – The Elegant Elephant of Pumperdink.
- Jenny Jump – A 15-year-old girl from New Jersey who became a half-fairy.
- Pastoria – The former mortal King of Oz who ruled long before the Wizard came and is the deceased father of Princess Ozma.
- Mombi – The former Wicked Witch of the North. Mombi once ruled the northern quadrant of Oz until the Good Witch Locasta Tattypoo overthrew her. She also was partially responsible for the mysterious disappearance of Princess Ozma.
- The Nome King – The main villain and antagonist in the Oz books. He is Oz's most threatening enemy who resides in the neighboring Nome Kingdom separated from Oz by the Deadly Desert. The Nome King is always trying to conquer Oz or thinking of ways to overthrow it throughout most of the entire series.

A shorthand reference for a person living in Oz is "Ozite". The term appears in Dorothy and the Wizard in Oz, The Road to Oz, and The Emerald City of Oz. Elsewhere in the books, "Ozmie" is also used. In the animated 1974 semi-sequel to the MGM film, Journey Back to Oz, "Ozonian" is in the script. The term "Ozian" appears in the Royal Shakespeare Company's stage adaptation of the MGM movie and in the work Wicked. "Ozmite" was used in Reilly & Lee marketing in the 1920s, a fact which has suggested to some critics that "Ozmie" may have been a typographical error.

== Other media ==
=== The 1939 MGM film's Oz ===
The Land of Oz as portrayed in the classic MGM musical movie of 1939, is quite different from that portrayed in Baum's books. The most notable difference is that in the film the entire land of Oz appears to be dreamed up by Dorothy Gale (thus making it a dream world), although Dorothy earnestly corrects the adults at the end that she was indeed there, and an image of Dorothy's falling farmhouse returning to earth is presented. The apparent message is that one should appreciate one's home, no matter how dull it may look or uninteresting its surroundings may be, for having a home and a family is not something that should be taken for granted. This contrasts sharply with the books, in which Dorothy and her family are eventually invited to move to Oz due to a bank foreclosure on the farm, showing both that Oz is a real place and that it is a utopia compared to the prairies of Kansas.

There are many other small differences between the books and the movie. For example, when Dorothy arrives in Munchkinland the Munchkins are seen wearing colorful costumes, but in the book, Munchkins are said to only wear blue as blue is the official dominant color of the east. The first witch Dorothy meets in Oz in the book is the Good Witch of the North, a minor character that only had one other appearance in Baum's books but is an important figure of Oz nonetheless. In the movie, this character is conflated with that of Glinda, who is the Good Witch of the South and does not make an appearance until the very end of Baum's story. The character of Glinda in the books dresses in all white silk, as white is the traditional color for good witches, whereas in the film she is seen in pink.

It is also worthy of note that the Dorothy of the books is only a little girl who is no more than twelve years old. However, she is mature and very resourceful, only crying when faced with ultimate despair, whereas the older Dorothy of the movie (portrayed as a twelve-year-old by sixteen-year-old Judy Garland) spends several portions of the film crying and being told by others what to do. This is more consistent with Thompson's portrayal of Dorothy—Baum is known for his strong and independent female characters.

The nature of the Emerald City is changed in the film. In the book, the city is not actually all green, but everyone is forced to wear green-tinted spectacles (ostensibly to protect their eyes from the glory and splendor of the luxurious city), thus making everything appear green. In the film, the city is actually green. The architecture of the Emerald City in the movie uses a much more contemporary Art Deco style than Baum could have imagined. In the book, a giant green wall studded in glittering emeralds surrounds the entire city, whereas in the movie there is only a gate opening.

=== Gregory Maguire's revisionist Oz ===
In his revisionist Oz novels Wicked: The Life and Times of the Wicked Witch of the West, Son of a Witch, A Lion Among Men and Out of Oz, Gregory Maguire portrays a very different version of the Land of Oz. Maguire's Oz is not Baum's utopia, but a land troubled by political unrest and economic hardship. One political issue in Maguire's novels is the oppression of the Animals (Maguire distinguishes speaking Animals from non-speaking animals by the use of initial capital letters). There are many religious traditions in Maguire's Oz, including Lurlinism (which regards the Fairy Lurline as Oz's creator), Unionism, which worships the Unnamed God, and the pleasure faiths which had swept Oz during the time that the witches were at Shiz. An example of the pleasure faiths was tic-tok (where creatures were enchanted to tell secrets or the future and run by clockwork) and sorcery.

Maguire's presentation of Oz's geography is also tinged with politics. A large political prison, Southstairs, exists in caverns below the Emerald City. Gillikin, home of Shiz University, has more industrial development than other parts of Oz. Munchkinland is Oz's breadbasket and at one point declares its independence from the rule of the Emerald City. Quadling Country is largely marshland, inhabited by the artistic and sexually free Quadlings. The Vinkus (Maguire's name for Winkie Country) is largely open grassland, populated by semi-nomadic tribes with brown skin.

The musical Wicked, based on Maguire's first Oz novel, portrays an Oz slightly closer to the version seen in Baum's novels and 1939 film. The oppression of the Animals is still a theme, but the geographical and religious divisions portrayed in Maguire's novel are barely present.

In both the book and musical, several characters from the traditional Oz stories are present with different names. Glinda was called Galinda but changed her name. The Wicked Witch of the West is called Elphaba, the Wicked Witch of the East is called Nessarose. In the musical, but not in the book, Boq becomes the Tin Man, and Fiyero becomes the Scarecrow.

=== Alexander Melentyevich Volkov's Magic Land ===
Alexander Melentyevich Volkov was a Russian author best known for his translation of The Wizard of Oz into Russian and for writing his own original sequels, which were based only loosely on Baum's. Volkov's books have been translated into many other languages and are better known than Baum's in some countries. The books, while still aimed at children, feature many mature political and ethical elements. They have been retranslated into English by Peter L. Blystone and partially by March Laumer, who used elements of them in his own books.

=== Philip José Farmer's Oz ===
Philip José Farmer portrays a very different Oz in his book A Barnstormer in Oz. The premise is that nothing after the first book occurred—Dorothy never returned to Oz and instead grew up, got married, and had a son. Her son, Hank Stover, is the main character, a World War I veteran flier and the titular barnstormer. While flying in his Curtiss JN-4 biplane he enters a green haze and emerges in the civil war-stricken land of Oz.

Farmer portrays the land of Oz as a science fiction author, attempting to explain scientifically many of the "magical" elements of Baum's story.

=== Robert A. Heinlein's Oz ===
The main characters of Robert A. Heinlein's books The Number of the Beast and The Pursuit of the Pankera pass through many famous fictional worlds including those of Alice's Adventures in Wonderland; Gulliver's Travels, specifically Lilliput; E.E. "Doc" Smith's Lensman universe; Asgard, connected to Heinlein's own Future History universe by the Rainbow Bridge for one specific reason in one specific location; and Ringworld; as well as some of Heinlein's own works, specifically those set in his Future History through which Lazarus Long moves; and of course the Land of Oz itself.

The Oz portrayed in the book is very close to Baum's Oz, although Heinlein does make an attempt to explain some things from the standpoint of a science fiction author. He explains that Oz is on a retrograde planet, where the direction of rotation relative to the poles is reversed, resulting in the sun seeming to rise in what would normally be the west.

Heinlein also explains that the population remains steady in Oz despite the lack of death because it is impossible for children to be born in Oz. When the population does increase through immigration, Glinda just extends the borders an inch or two in each direction, which makes more than enough space for all additional people.

=== L. Sprague de Camp's Oz ===
L. Sprague de Camp, like Heinlein, brings his own characters to Oz in his book Sir Harold and the Gnome King, part of the collaborative Harold Shea series. Unlike Heinlein, he does not attempt to explain Oz as science fiction, though he does deviate from the original corpus. He follows Thompson's Oz books, thus using her spelling of "Gnome" and her final fate of the character, but he postulates an incident that has removed the Ozites' immortality, with the result that both Ozma and Dorothy have aged and married by the time his story takes place.

=== Tad Williams' Otherland Oz ===
In the Otherland series, by Tad Williams, a virtual reality version of Oz exists, wherein real-world antagonists play sadistic versions of the roles of the Tin Man, The Scarecrow, and the Cowardly Lion, in a twisted, martial, and post-apocalyptic version of Oz, populated both by characters from the novels and a large quantity of male and female humans who go by the names "Henry" and "Em" respectively. The humans, computer-generated characters based on the lost minds of children drawn into the Otherland program, look forward to a messianic prophecy foretelling the coming of "The Dorothy", where a child would be born among them.

=== The Outer Zone (Tin Man) ===
2007 Sci Fi television miniseries Tin Man reinvents Oz as the Outer Zone (O.Z.), a parallel universe that was first visited by Dorothy Gale during the latter Victorian Era and is ruled over by her descendants. It is implied, by reference to centuries having elapsed since Dorothy came to the O.Z., that time has progressed at different rates in the O.Z. and "the other side". The reimagined Oz is described as a place where "the paint has peeled, and what was once the goodness of Oz has become the horrible bleakness of the O.Z." The scenic design of the O.Z. features elements of steampunk, particularly the "1930s fascist realist" decor of the evil sorceress's palace and the computer-generated Central City, analog of the Emerald City.

=== Emerald City Confidential ===
The 2009 point-and-click adventure video game Emerald City Confidential reinvents Oz in a film noir style, with Dorothy Gale as a femme fatale, the Lion as a corrupt lawyer, and some other changes.

=== Once Upon a Time ===
The Land of Oz appears in the TV series Once Upon a Time and is the focus of the episodes "It's Not Easy Being Green", "Kansas", "Heart of Gold", "Our Decay", "Ruby Slippers", and "Where Bluebirds Fly". It was also seen briefly in the episodes "Sisters" and "Chosen".

=== OZ: A Fantasy Role-Playing Setting ===
In 2022, Andrew Kolb released OZ: A Fantasy Role-Playing Setting, designed for use with tabletop role-playing games, in particular 5th Edition Dungeons and Dragons. In this version of Oz, the kingdom is more akin to a city, closely resembling an art deco style in the vein of the 1920s. The city of Oz is broken up into a variety of districts, many of which can be found in the original novel, but adds certain modernizations including a monorail, a complex judiciary system, and a number of political factions.

== Magic of Oz ==
Being a fantasy series Oz is rich in magic. In particular, there are many magic items that play an important role in the series.

=== Silver Shoes/Ruby Slippers ===
When Dorothy leaves Oz after having several adventures there and befriending many of Oz's natives, she is magically carried over the Deadly Desert by means of the charmed Silver Shoes she had been given shortly after her unexpected arrival when her farmhouse landed on and killed the previous pair's owner, the Wicked Witch of the East. After knocking her heels together three times and wishing to return home, Dorothy is lifted into the air and transported to Kansas. The shoes, however, slip off of Dorothy's feet and are lost forever in the desert. Baum states the silver shoes are never recovered. In the 1939 film, the shoes are changed to Ruby Slippers. When Dorothy clicks her heels together she closes her eyes and says: "There's no place like home". She then wakes up in her bedroom in Kansas believing her experience in Oz to be an elaborate dream.

Silver shoes and ruby slippers are found in adaptations of Baum's Oz books. In Gregory Maguire's Wicked, the shoes are decorated with thousands of glass beads that can change color or appear to be several colors at once. The shoes are also lost when Dorothy is teleported back home just like in Baum's novel. In the Broadway musical adaption of Wicked, the silver shoes belonged to Melena, the mother of Elphaba and her paraplegic sister Nessarose. A gift presented to Nessarose on her first day at Shiz University, Elphaba later enchants them to allow Nessarose to walk, changing their color to red in the process.

In 1985's Return to Oz, the ruby slippers have been recovered from their place in the Deadly Desert by the Nome King. Dorothy retrieves the slippers, using them to wish for Oz's restoration. Princess Ozma uses them to send Dorothy home to Kansas.

A little-known adaptation of the original story made for British television in the mid-90s starring Denise van Outen explained that they had belonged to a visitor from over the rainbow who came to Oz before Dorothy and they were obtained by the Witch when the visitor wished herself home and they fell off her feet on the return trip.

=== Powder of Life ===
The Powder of Life is a magic substance from the book series, which first appears in The Marvelous Land of Oz.

It is a magical powder that brings inanimate objects to life. The witch Mombi first obtained it from a "crooked magician." Later in the series, it is revealed that the substance is made by a Dr. Pipt. In order to make the substance, Dr. Pipt had to stir four large cauldrons for six years. Only a few grains of the powder could be made at a time. It is always described as being carried in a pepper box.

In The Marvelous Land of Oz, the Powder of Life was used to bring Jack Pumpkinhead, the Sawhorse, and the Gump to life. The first batch of the powder in Mombi's possession was activated by the following incantation and the action that had to be associated with:

- Raise the left hand, little finger pointing upward, and say: "Weaugh!"
- Raise the right hand, thumb pointing upward, and say: "Teaugh!"
- Raise both hands, with all the fingers and thumbs spread out, and say: "Peaugh!"

In The Road to Oz, Dr. Pipt's sister Dyna activated the Powder of Life with a simple wish that brought the rug of her late blue bear pet to life.

In The Patchwork Girl of Oz it brings the title character to life, also the glass cat and a phonograph.

Mombi's shaker also contained three "wishing pills" fabricated by Dr. Nikidik.

The Powder has been used by Volkov in his series. There, it is produced from a certain plant of such viability that the smallest piece can grow into a plant within a day, on any surface except for solid metal. However, if it is sun-dried on such a surface, it turns into the Powder of Life. No incantation is required to make the powder work. The second book of the series is centered around a man who animates an army of wooden soldiers with the Powder and uses them for conquering the Magic Land.

In Return to Oz, the magic words to bring the inanimate object to life were "WEAUGH, TEAUGH, PEAUGH".

=== Magic Belt ===
The Magic Belt is first introduced in Ozma of Oz. The belt belonged to the Nome King, but Dorothy Gale stole it and defeated him. When she leaves Oz, she gives it to Ozma for safekeeping.

In most Oz books, the Magic Belt grants its wearer the ability to transform anyone into any form, and the ability to transport anyone anywhere, and also makes its wearer impervious to harm. In some books, it also grants limited wishes.

In Ozma of Oz, its power is limited: its magic cannot affect objects which are made of wood.

In the non-canonical The Oz Kids animated series, the Magic Belt belonged to Dot.

=== Magic Picture ===
In Ozma's boudoir hangs a picture in a radium frame. This picture usually appears to be of pleasant countryside, but when anyone wishes for the picture to show a particular person or place, the scene will display what is wished for. Sometimes the onlooker is able to hear sounds from the scene within the Magic Picture and sometimes an additional device is necessary to transmit sound.

A similar device is present in Volkov's series. There, it is given as a present to the Scarecrow by the Good Witch of the South. It is a box of pink wood with a thick frosted glass screen. The device is password activated and limited in range to the Magic Land (with the exception of deep caverns and certain types of magical interference). The box is shown to be virtually indestructible; it withstood repeated abuse from a villain attempting to use it.

=== Great Book of Records ===
Glinda's 'Great Book of Records is introduced in Chapter 29 of The Emerald City of Oz: " 'It is a record of everything that happens,' replied the Sorceress. 'As soon as an event takes place, anywhere in the world, it is immediately found printed in my Magic Book. So when I read its pages I am well informed.' " The Book proves useful in The Scarecrow of Oz and Glinda of Oz; and it recurs in many of the stories of Baum's successors and imitators. For instance, in The Number of the Beast, the Book is shown to cover more than simply Oz. It provided information concerning the "Black Hats" attempting to murder the four protagonists which enabled Glinda to devise a set of magical glasses requested by Hilda Burroughs that enable her to spot a Black Hat no matter how disguised. It is one of the prime magic devices of Oz; villains steal it when they can (as in The Lost Princess of Oz or in Handy Mandy in Oz). Since it covers the planet and not merely Oz, the Book's entries are compressed, sometimes cryptic, and difficult to decipher (as in Paradox in Oz or Queen Ann in Oz).

The book is also featured in the fantasy series Once Upon a Time. Zelena reads the book ignoring Glinda's warning and turns green again because she felt betrayed as it was mentioned in the book that Dorothy would save Oz from a great evil (Zelena thought that evil was her but this was never revealed).

=== The Love Magnet ===
A rusty-looking horseshoe magnet that causes everyone to love its owner. It is closely associated with the Shaggy Man. In The Road to Oz, he finds that being loved by everyone can be inconvenient. In Tik-Tok of Oz he reveals that Ozma has modified its powers so that it only works when it is displayed and affects only the feelings of those who see it. It is an essential plot-element in The Shaggy Man of Oz. Ozma keeps it hanging over the gate into the Emerald City so that all who enter will come with love, although this does not always seem to happen.

=== Magic Fan ===
The Magic Fan is brought to Oz by Dorothy in The Royal Book of Oz. Several subsequent books mention it. It creates a powerful wind, capable of blowing away an invading army.

=== Fountain of Oblivion ===
A fountain in the Emerald City, erected by the witch Glinda to reform a wicked king of Oz in the past. Anyone who drinks from it forgets everything he knows, including his own name. It appears in Baum's The Emerald City of Oz and The Magic of Oz, and it also plays an important role in the later contributor stories The Forbidden Fountain of Oz, The Shaggy Man of Oz, The Wicked Witch of Oz, and Paradox in Oz.

=== Magic Dinner Bell ===
Created by the Red Jinn, it summons a slave named Ginger, who appears bearing a tray full of delicious food when the bell is rung. Besides providing food, the bell also provides a means of escape from danger: anyone who holds onto the slave when he disappears after bringing the food is transported with him to the Red Jinn's castle. There are actually two magic dinner bells, one in the Emerald City and another which the Red Jinn keeps for himself and uses while traveling. The bell is first introduced in Jack Pumpkinhead of Oz and also appears in The Purple Prince of Oz and The Silver Princess in Oz.

== Miscellaneous ==
=== Talking animals ===
In Oz, animals such as the Cowardly Lion and the Hungry Tiger can talk, and all native animals appear to be capable of speech. Wicked: The Life and Times of the Wicked Witch of the West emphasized the difference between Animals and animals. Animals (capitalized) are sentient beings that can talk. Several theories exist as to how animals gained the gift of speech.

The treatment of non-native animals was inconsistent. In the first book, the dog Toto never speaks, although brought to Oz; in The Patchwork Girl of Oz, Dorothy specifies that he cannot speak because he is not a fairy dog. However, in Ozma of Oz, the chicken Billina acquires speech merely by being swept to the lands near Oz and, in Dorothy and the Wizard in Oz, the same is true of the kitten Eureka and the cab horse Jim when reaching the land of Mangaboos, a similarly magical land. In Tik-Tok of Oz, Baum restored the continuity: Toto can speak, and always could, but never bothered to, because it was unnecessary.

An additional inconsistency is introduced with Tik-Tok of Oz: Hank the Mule cannot speak until reaching the Land of Oz, although he lands on the shore of Ev first, where Billina the chicken gained the ability to speak. This might be because Tik-Tok of Oz was originally a stage play version of Ozma of Oz; Dorothy was replaced by Betsy because he had sold the stage rights for Dorothy, and Billina was replaced by Hank because a mule could more convincingly be played by two people in a costume. Hank probably could not talk because Baum already had two speaking comedy characters, the Shaggy Man and Tik-Tok. Thus Hank would fill a better niche as a visual comedy character, in the tradition of British pantomime. The part of Hank was also an analog to the part of Dorothy's cow Imogene, Toto's replacement on stage in the immensely successful 1903 Broadway version of The Wizard of Oz, a success that Baum sought to duplicate for the rest of his life.

There is one small kingdom in Oz where animals are unable to talk: Corumbia.

=== Origin of the name Oz ===
A legend of uncertain validity is that when relating bedtime stories (the earliest form of the Oz books) Baum was asked by his niece, Ramona Baxter Bowden, the name of the magical land. He glanced at a nearby filing cabinet, which had three drawers, labeled A–G, H–N, and O–Z. Thus he named the land Oz. This story was first told in 1903, but his wife always insisted that the part about the filing cabinet was not true. In Dorothy and the Wizard in Oz, the name is translated as "great and good". Several of Baum's fairy stories that take place in the United States were situated on the Ozark Plateau, and the similarity of the name may not be a coincidence.

== Legacy ==
In 2018, The Lost Art of Oz project was initiated to locate and catalog the surviving original artwork John R. Neill, W. W. Denslow, Frank Kramer, Richard "Dirk" Gringhuis and Dick Martin created to illustrate the Oz book series.
