= The Wicked Witch of Oz =

Book by Rachel Cosgrove Payes

- First edition
- Author: Rachel Cosgrove Payes
- Illustrator: Eric Shanower
- Language: English
- Series: The Oz Books
- Genre: Fantasy
- Publisher: The International Wizard of Oz Club
- Publication date: 1993
- Publication place: United States
- Media type: Print (Hardcover)
- Pages: 320
- ISBN: 1-930764-04-9
- Preceded by: The Ozmapolitan of Oz
- Followed by: The Giant Garden of Oz

The Wicked Witch of Oz is a novel by Rachel Cosgrove Payes. Written in the early 1950s but not published until four decades later in 1993, the book is an unofficial entry in the series of Oz books by L. Frank Baum and his successors.

Cosgrove Payes had published her first Oz book, The Hidden Valley of Oz, in 1951 with Reilly & Lee, the publisher of the Oz series since the time of Baum. The Wicked Witch of Oz would have been the next book in the series, and was intended for publication in 1954 but Reilly & Lee cancelled the project, since the Oz books were no longer selling well. The book remained unpublished until the International Wizard of Oz Club brought out the first edition in 1993, with illustrations by Eric Shanower. The club declared it book 45 in the series. In the documentary, Oz: The American Fairyland, Payes states that she refused all requests to read her manuscript with "not 'til it's a book."

== Synopsis ==
The title character is Singra, the Wicked Witch of the South. She awakens after sleeping for a century; her Magical Musical Snuffbox informs her of all the events she has missed in the last hundred years. Armed with this knowledge, Singra sets out to brew a spell of revenge against Dorothy Gale, the main agent of unwelcome change. Grudgingly rescuing a water nymph along the way, she is granted her wish to become impervious to water so that she will not melt like her late cousin, the Wicked Witch of the West.

Singra waylays the Scarecrow, and tricks the girl she thinks is Dorothy into drinking her potion. Singra, however, has blundered: she has mistaken Trot for Dorothy, turning the little girl into a piece of green cheese. Dorothy sets out to rescue Trot, while Singra continues to seek her vengeance.

Dorothy is aided by Percy, a giant talking white rat - a character that Cosgrove Payes introduced in The Hidden Valley of Oz. In their efforts, they encounter a rubber band (that is, a band of rubber musicians), and an animated neon man named Leon the Neon. The trio of Dorothy, Percy, and Leon confront a giant beehive, and Dorothy and Percy take flight on hummingbird wings. Singra enchants Dorothy into a statue, but her friends, Ozma, the Wizard, Jellia Jamb, and the rest, manage to unravel Singra's scheme. Singra drinks from the Forbidden Fountain, and is purged of her malicious intent along with her memory.

The Oz books
Previous book: The Ozmapolitan of Oz	The Wicked Witch of Oz; 1993	Next book: The Giant Garden of Oz
