= The Road to Oz =

1909 novel by L. Frank Baum

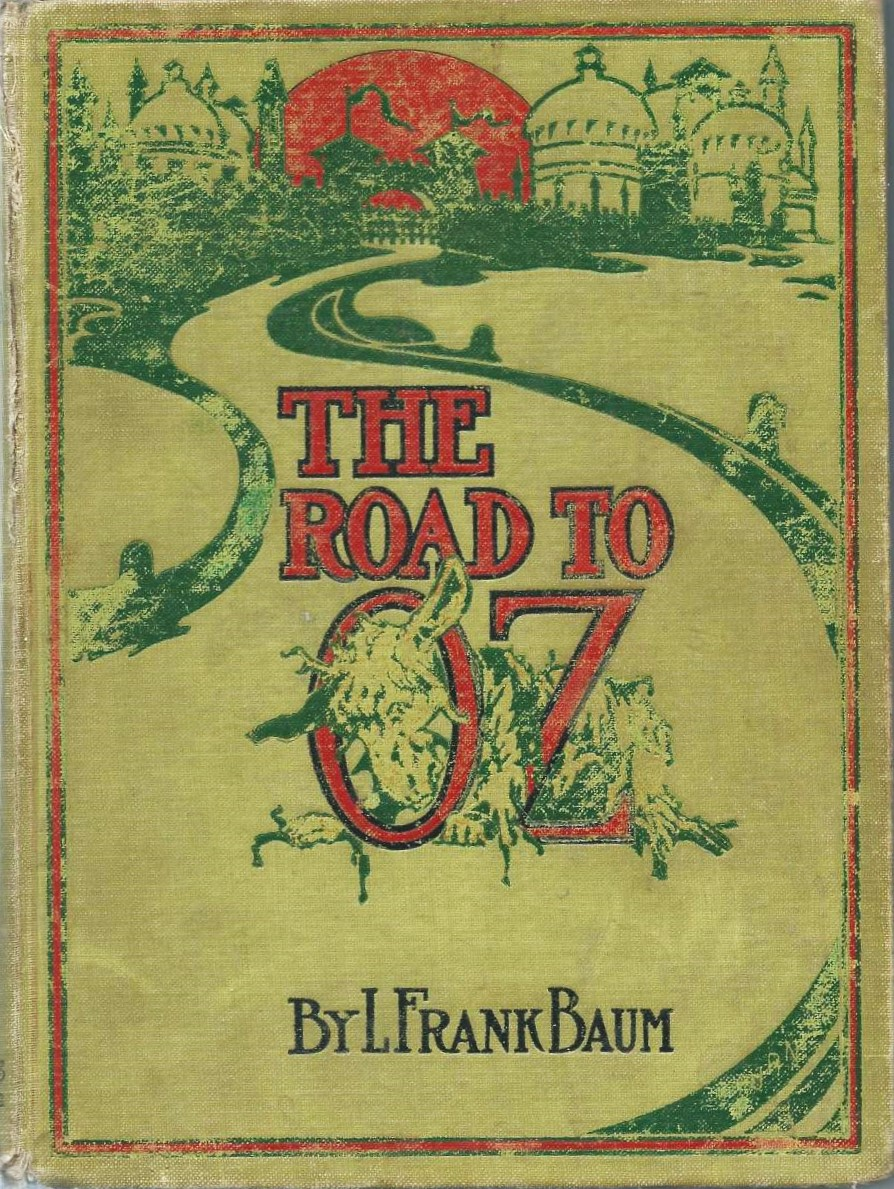
- First edition
- Author: L. Frank Baum
- Illustrator: John R. Neill
- Language: English
- Series: The Oz Books
- Genre: Children's novel
- Publisher: Reilly & Britton
- Publication date: 1909
- Publication place: United States
- Media type: Print (hardcover)
- Pages: 261
- Preceded by: Dorothy and the Wizard in Oz
- Followed by: The Emerald City of Oz
- Text: The Road to Oz at Wikisource

The Road to Oz is the fifth book in L. Frank Baum's Oz series. It was originally published on July 10, 1909 and documents the adventures of Dorothy Gale's fourth visit to the Land of Oz. It was followed by The Emerald City of Oz (1910).

== Plot ==
While Dorothy Gale is at home in Kansas one day, she and her pet dog Toto meet the Shaggy Man who comes walking past the Gale farm. He is a friendly, yet slightly senile hobo with an optimistic, care free mentality. He politely asks Dorothy for directions to Butterfield, which is the nearest town on the prairie. The girl agrees to show him the way, bringing her dog with her.

Further on, the road splits into seven paths. They take the seventh one and soon find themselves lost in what appears to be another dimension. The trio meets Button-Bright, a cute and wealthy little boy in a sailor's outfit who is always getting lost. Later, the companions encounter Polychrome, the beautiful and ethereal Daughter of the Rainbow who is stranded on Earth. Polychrome explains that she accidentally fell off her father's bow while dancing on it. The bow ascended into the atmosphere and back into the clouds before she was able to climb her way back on it, thus being left behind.

Dorothy, Toto, the Shaggy Man, Button-Bright, and Polychrome come to the peculiar town of Foxville, where anthropomorphic foxes live. With prompting from King Dox of Foxville, Dorothy deduces that she and Toto are obviously on another "fairy adventure" that will ultimately lead them to the magical Land of Oz, just in time for Princess Ozma's royal birthday party. The king takes a particular liking to Button Bright, whom he considers astute and clever due to his tabula rasa-like mind. Believing that the human face does not suit one so clever, Dox gives him a fox's head which he is unable to remove. A similar event subsequently happens to the Shaggy Man, when King Kik-a-Bray of Dunkiton confers a donkey's head upon him — also in reward for cleverness, even though it is implied that Foxville and Dunkiton exist at odds with one another. Though both of them ask Dorothy to procure them invitations to Princess Ozma's birthday party.

After meeting the Musicker (who produces music from his breath) and fighting off the Scoodlers (who fight by removing their own heads and throwing them at the travelers), Dorothy and her companions reach the edge of the fatal Deadly Desert completely surrounding the Land of Oz. There, the Shaggy Man's friend Johnny Dooit builds a "sand-boat" by which they may cross. This is necessary because physical contact with the desert's sands, as of this book and Ozma of Oz (1907), will turn the travelers to dust.

Upon reaching the Land of Oz, Dorothy and her companions are warmly welcomed by the mechanical man Tik-Tok and Billina the Yellow Hen. They proceed in company to come in their travels to the Truth Pond where Button Bright and the Shaggy Man regain their true heads by bathing in its waters. They meet the Tin Woodman, the Scarecrow, and Jack Pumpkinhead who journey with them to the imperial capital known as the Emerald City for Ozma's grand birthday bash. Dorothy meets up with Ozma as her chariot is pulled in by the Cowardly Lion and the Hungry Tiger.

As preparations for Ozma's birthday party are made, the guests include Dorothy, Scarecrow, Tin Woodman, Cowardly Lion, the Wizard of Oz, Jack Pumpkinhead, the Sawhorse, Tik-Tok, Billina, Jellia Jamb, Woggle-Bug, Hungry Tiger, the Good Witch of the North, Shaggy Man, Button-Bright, Polychrome, and characters from all over Nonestica such as Santa Claus, a band of Ryls, and a bunch of Knooks from the Forest of Burzee, Queen Zixi of Ix, the Queen of Merryland, four wooden soldiers, and the Candy Man from Merryland, the Braided Man from Boboland's Pyramid Mountain, the Queen of Ev, King Evoldo, and his nine siblings from the Land of Ev, King Bud and Princess Fluff from Noland, and John Dough, Chick the Cherub, and Para Bruin the Rubber Bear from Hiland and Loland. While invitations were sent to King Dox, King Kik-a-Bray, and Johnny Dooit, Princess Ozma couldn't procure an invitation to the Musicker due to a chance that his uncontrollable vocal tic might arouse violence against him. The Shaggy Man receives permission to stay in Oz permanently. He is also given a new suit of clothes having bobtails in place of his former costume's ragged edges, so that he may retain his name and identity.

After everyone has presented their gifts and feasted at a lavish banquet in Ozma's honor, the Wizard of Oz demonstrates a method of using bubbles as transportation by which to send everyone home. Polychrome is finally found by her rainbow family and she is magically lifted into the sky when she climbs back onto her bow. Button-Bright leaves with Santa Claus in a soap bubble with the Sawhorse loaned to Santa Claus. Dorothy and Toto are finally wished back home to Kansas again by Ozma's use of the Magic Belt.

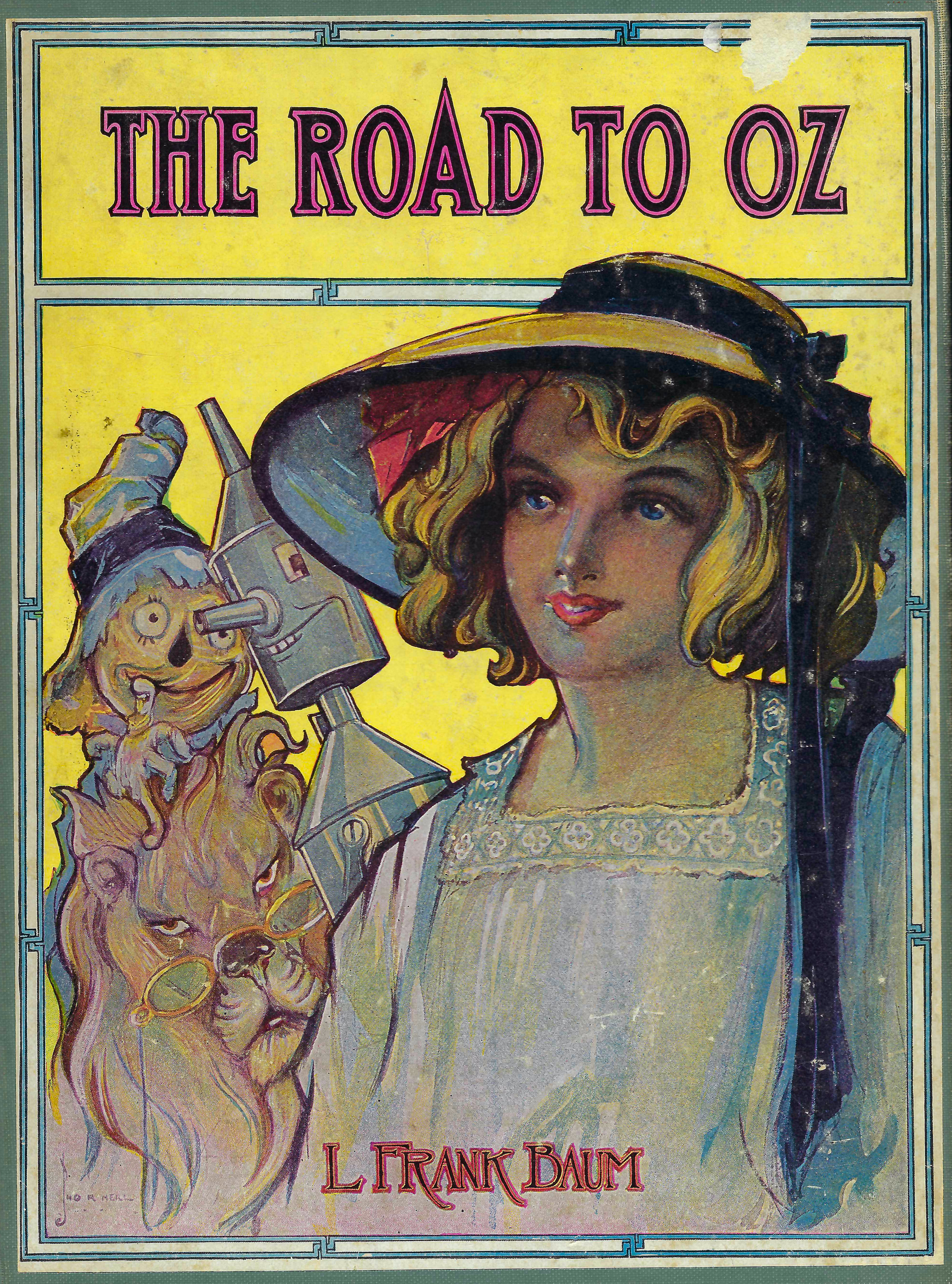
Original dust jacket art used as cover for later printings

== Publication history ==
The sales figures of Baum's other fantasy novels always lagged behind his Oz novels; it has therefore been theorized that the "guest appearances" of his non-Oz characters in The Road to Oz were a marketing ploy to raise interest in those other titles.

This is the only Oz book to be printed on colored pages instead of with colored pictures. The colored pages represent the signature colors of the various countries of Oz that Dorothy and her companions travel through on their way to the Emerald City.

The Tin Woodman's garden features images of Dorothy and Toto, representing them as they first arrived in Oz. The illustrator, John R. Neill, apparently takes this description literally, by causing the statues to resemble the illustrations made by his predecessor, W.W. Denslow. This is in contrast to the "real" Dorothy, who is drawn here much as she is drawn in all of the Oz books illustrated by Neill. It is implied that she is amused by the differences present.

== Reception ==
In A Brief Guide to Oz, Paul Simpson notes, "The Road to Oz contradicts earlier stories by claiming there's no money in Oz, with many Oz scholars speculating that Baum is suggesting a very communist ethos at work."

The Oz books
Previous book: Dorothy and the Wizard in Oz	The Road to Oz; 1909	Next book: The Emerald City of Oz
