= Shaggy Man =

The Shaggy Man
- Oz character
- First appearance: The Road to Oz (1909)
- Created by: L. Frank Baum

In-universe information
- Alias: Shagrick Mann
- Nickname: Shaggy
- Species: Human
- Gender: Male
- Title: Governor of the Royal Storehouses
- Occupation: Wireless telegraph operator
- Family: Brother, sometimes known as "Ugly One" or "Wiggy"
- Nationality: American

The Shaggy Man is a character in the Oz books by L. Frank Baum. He first appeared in the book The Road to Oz in 1909.

He is a kindly old wandering hobo, dressed in rags. His philosophy of life centers on both love and an aversion to material possessions. His one possession of value is the Love Magnet. His individuality is not welcome in the United States, but is accorded respect in the Land of Oz, where Princess Ozma provides him with a fine wardrobe of silks, satins, and velvets, but as shaggy as his old rags.

== Character biography ==
The Shaggy Man appears at the Kansas home of Dorothy Gale one day in August, asking for directions to the nearby town of Butterfield so as to avoid going there by accident, for he wants to avoid a man who would return a loan of fifteen cents: as "Money...makes people proud and haughty. I don't want to be proud and haughty." Dorothy agrees to show him the way, but after a short time the two become inexplicably lost. The Shaggy Man tells Dorothy about a magical device he has called the Love Magnet, which causes the owner to be loved by everyone he meets. He claims that this artifact was given to him by "an Eskimo in the Sandwich Islands."

Eventually Dorothy and the Shaggy Man realize that they are wandering in an unknown fairyland. After a series of adventures, he and Dorothy reach the Deadly Desert, where his ingenuity lets them pass safely over the sands. Arriving in the Land of Oz, they find that their journey has been prearranged so that Dorothy can attend a birthday party for Princess Ozma. The Shaggy Man is awed by the splendor of the fairy-realm, and resolves to live there permanently. Upon being questioned by Ozma, he reveals that he has actually stolen the Love Magnet from a girl in Butterfield, but is without remorse because doing so has allowed him to travel to Oz with Dorothy. Nevertheless, eager to be a good subject to the princess, he agrees to Ozma's decree that the Love Magnet be donated to the Emerald City and hung over the city gates.

In The Patchwork Girl of Oz, the Shaggy Man serendipitously arrives to rescue Ojo and his traveling companions from man-eating plants that attack them along a yellow brick road in the Munchkin Country. In Tik-Tok of Oz, it is revealed that the Shaggy Man has a long-lost brother who is being held prisoner by the Nome King. Much of that book revolves about his efforts and those of his companions to rescue and disenchant this brother. Finally, the Shaggy Man decides to give up Oz to remain with his brother and other companions; the prospect of losing him from Oz persuades Ozma to allow these others to enter Oz. Much like the Shaggy Man himself, this brother has no name which is ever revealed to the readers, and is simply identified as "the Shaggy Man's brother." He was called Wiggy in the stage version.

In The Shaggy Man of Oz, the love magnet has worn through the nail and broken, and the Shaggy Man must go to the creator of the love magnet, Conjo (a retcon) in order to have it fixed. To get there, he visits many of the places visited in John Dough and the Cherub.

In the modern Oz book Queen Ann in Oz (1993), authors Carlson and Gjovaag give the Shaggy Man a personal name — Shagrick Mann.

== Portrayal ==
Although Baum used The Shaggy Man a great deal in his books from his first appearance onward, he did not appear in any productions of The Oz Film Manufacturing Company, nor did he appear much in the work of Baum's successors other than Jack Snow.

Frank F. Moore portrayed the role on the Los Angeles stage opposite James C. Morton as Tik-Tok in the 1913 play The Tik-Tok Man of Oz. The role was modeled on Fred Stone's Scarecrow in The Wizard of Oz, and Moore later played the Scarecrow in His Majesty, the Scarecrow of Oz.

In comics, Shaggy Man appeared briefly in Eric Shanower's The Ice King of Oz and in issue #19 of Oz.

== In other media ==
The Shaggy Man appears in Return to Oz. He is seen in the background at Princess Ozma's coronation.
