= List of Oz characters (post-Baum) =

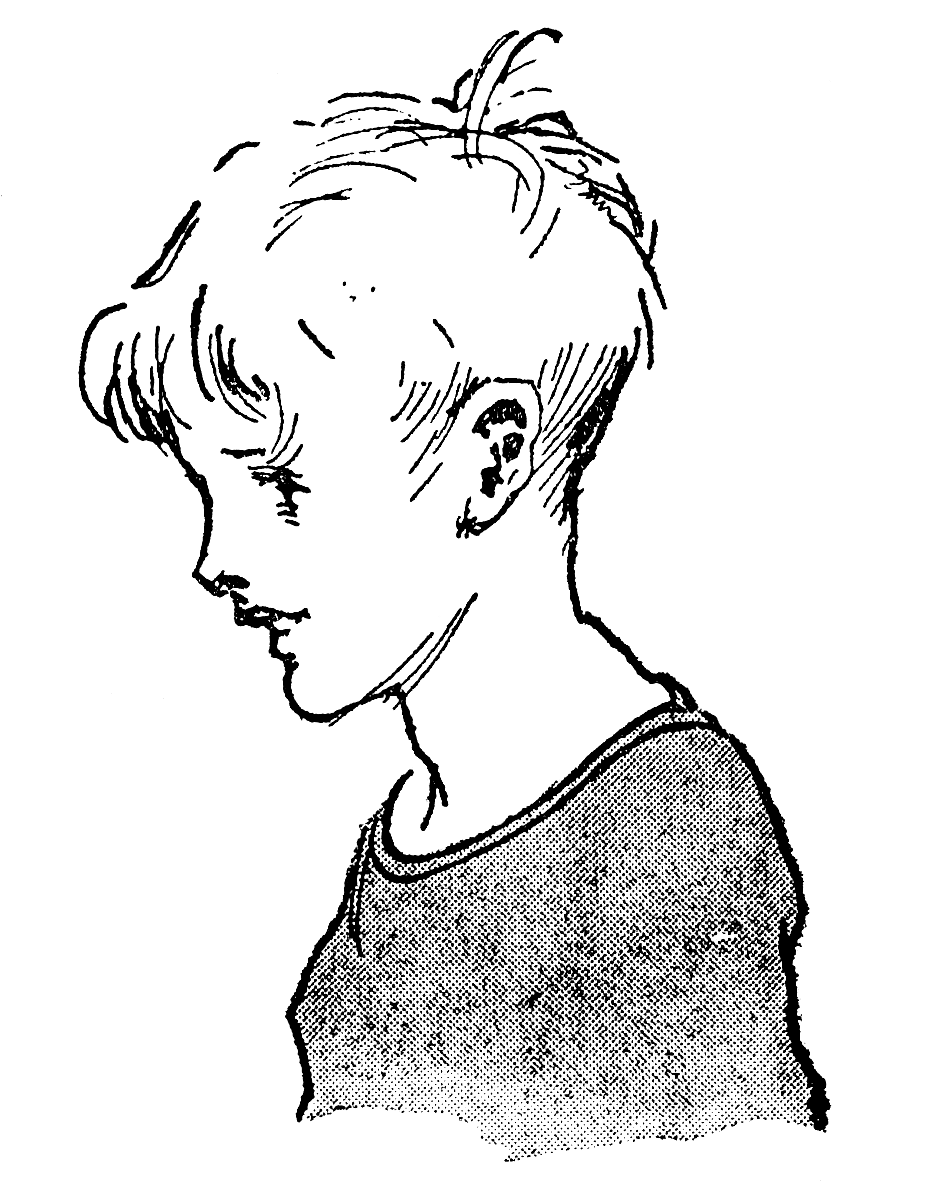
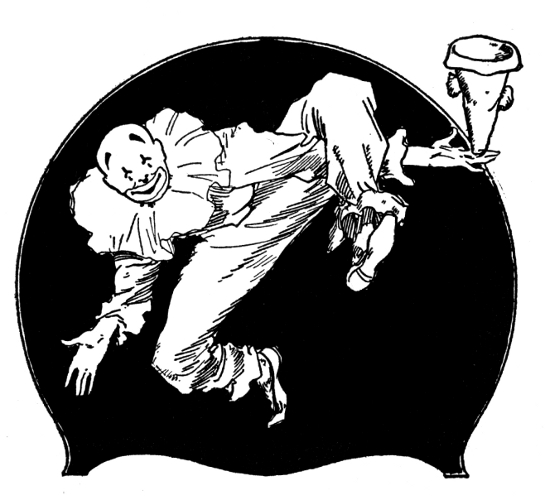
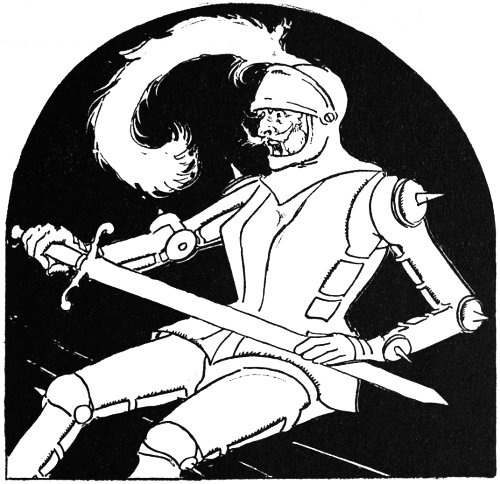
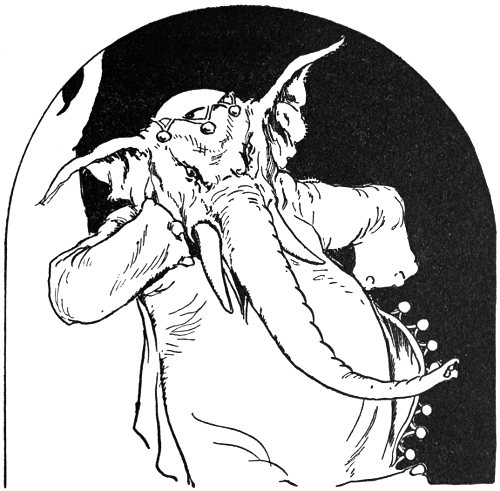
A group of prominent characters introduced by Ruth Plumly Thompson following Baum's death. From the top left, clockwise: Peter Brown, Notta Bit More, Kabumpo and Sir Hokus of Pokes.

This is a list of characters in the original sequel Oz books by L. Frank Baum's successors.

After Baum's death in 1919, publisher Reilly & Lee continued to produce annual Oz books, passing on the role of Royal Historian. Ruth Plumly Thompson took up the task in 1921, and wrote nineteen Oz books yearly through 1939. After Thompson, Reilly & Lee published seven more books in the series: three by John R. Neill, two by Jack Snow, one by Rachel R. Cosgrove, and a final book by Eloise Jarvis McGraw and Lauren Lynn McGraw. The books in Reilly & Lee's Oz series are called "the Famous Forty" by fans, and are considered the canonical Oz texts.

== A–K ==
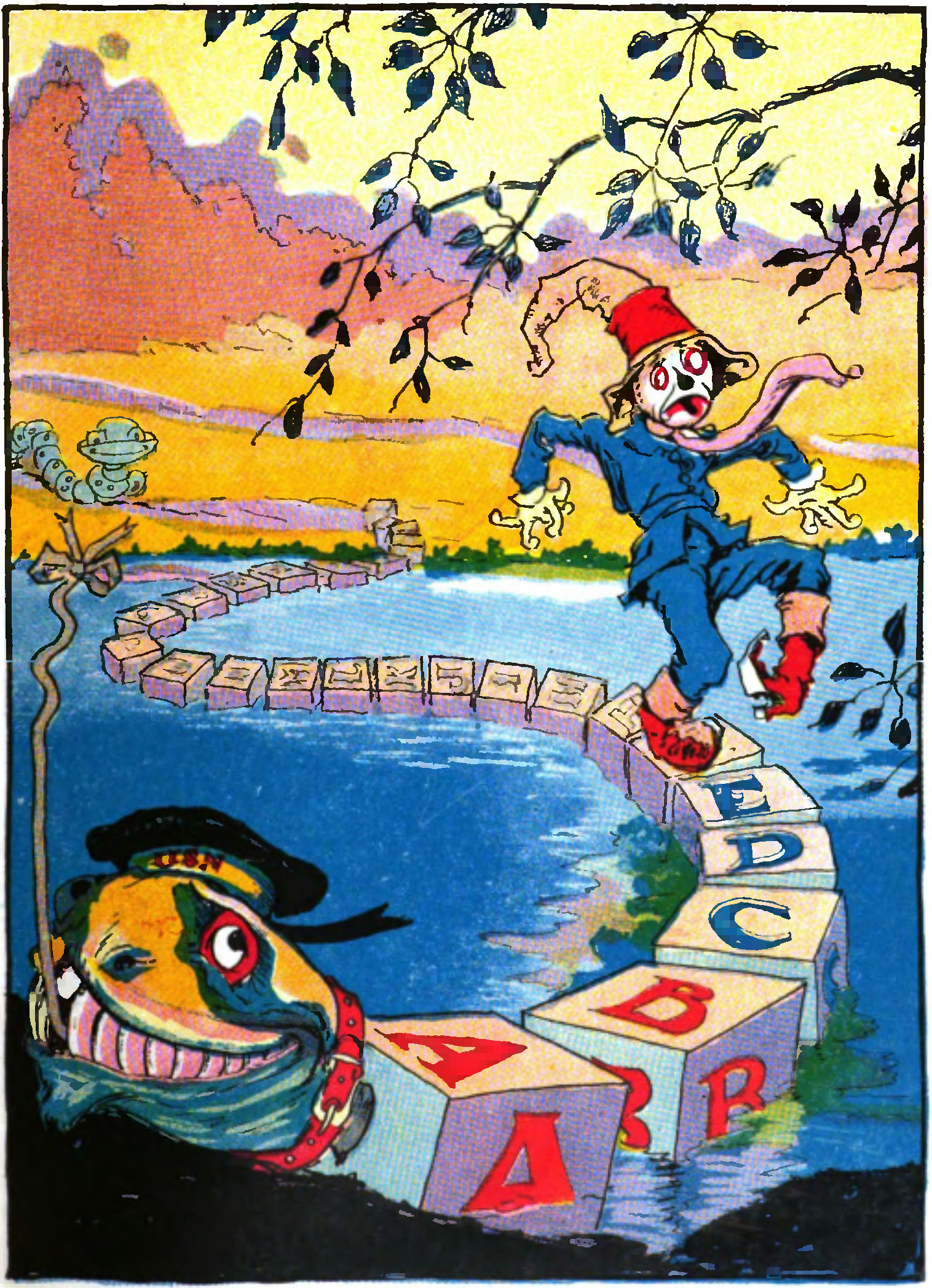
The Scarecrow on the A-B Sea Serpent in an illustration by John R. Neill

=== A-B-Sea Serpent ===
The A-B-Sea Serpent is a large snake made of alphabet blocks who comes from Mer City in the Nonestic Ocean.

First appearing in Thompson's The Royal Book of Oz (1921), the A-B-Sea Serpent and the Rattlesnake were on vacation in the Munchkin River where they encounter the Scarecrow. After A-B-Sea Serpent helped Scarecrow cross the Munchkin River, he invited A-B-Sea Serpent and Rattlesnake to the Emerald City to meet Princess Ozma, Betsy Bobbin, Patchwork Girl, and Tin Woodman.

=== Agnes ===
Agnes is a dragon who appeared in Thompson's The Giant Horse of Oz (1928). She is the close friend and assistant of the Good Witch of the North.

=== Belfaygor of Bourne ===
Belfaygor of Bourne is a major character in Thompson's Jack Pumpkinhead of Oz (1929).

Belfaygor resides in the Land of the Barons location of Bourne in the Quadling Country. He is in love with Shirley Sunshine, but because of a magic spell poorly cast by his Miserable Mesmerizer when he asked for a beard for his wedding day, his beard grows at such a rapid rate that he must carry scissors to constantly cut it. This causes severe problems when sleeping. When he is locked in a prison cell with Peter Brown, Jack Pumpkinhead, and Snif the (Gr)iffin, all except Jack get a close-call as his beard grows in the night, filling so much of the cell that it makes it difficult to breathe.

Belfaygor's curse is often brought up in discussions of the inconsistencies about aging and death in the Land of Oz, as it indicates that mitosis continues to exist in Oz.

After Shirley Sunshine is rescued from Mogodore the Mighty, Belfaygore's beard disappears when he is caught and released from the pirate sack Peter found in Thompson's The Gnome King of Oz as well as the enchantment being broken by the Wizard of Oz. Afterward, he vows never to grow a beard again as he finally marries Shirley.

Jack Snow's encyclopedia Who's Who in Oz (1954) describes Belfaygor as ruler over all the other barons, although Thompson never implied that this was the case.

In the 2013 film Legends of Oz: Dorothy's Return, Belfaygor is shown among the captives of the Jester that were turned into marionettes.

Belfaygor's name is similar to Belphegor, a spirit of sloth in medieval European demonology, but has no demonic attributes himself.

With the expiration of his source novel's copyright on 1 January 2025, Belfaygor entered the public domain.

=== Bell-snickle ===
Bell-snickle is the major villain of Neill's The Scalawagons of Oz (1941). He is described as being like a blue-green buckwheat cake, and is proud to be a mystery. He interferes with the flabber-gas that operates the Scalawagons, sending them out of control. After his defeat, Jenny Jump used him as a rubber stamp in her shop.

Bell-snickle appears to be named after the German folkloric character Belsnickel, but does not have any obvious resemblance to him.

=== Captain Samuel Salt ===
Captain Samuel Salt is the sea captain of the Crescent Moon who first appears in Thompson's Pirates in Oz (1931).

While he gained fame as a pirate captain, he was most interested in exploring causing his crew to abandon him and take two of his ships. When he arrived on Octagon Island, he encountered King Ako whose men also deserted him. The two of them left alongside Ako's companion Roger the Read Bird. The three of them met Peter Brown when they were looking for their deserted crew. After Ruggedo and the pirates are defeated, Captain Salt leaves the pirate business and remains in Oz as the Royal Explorer.

In Thompson's Captain Salt in Oz, Captain Salt had the Crescent Moon refitted by Jinnicky the Red Jinn. He, King Ako, Roger the Read Bird where they discovered Patrippany, Ozamaland, Peakenspire Island, the Sea Forest, and Seeweegia.

Captain Salt is one of Thompson's more popular Oz creations, but his copyright status has restricted his use by other authors. While his titular novel entered the public domain in 1965 due to a clerical oversight, his first appearance remains protected until 1 January 2027.

=== Clocker ===
Clocker is a clock-headed man who serves as the wise man of Menankypoo and first appears in Thompson's Pirates in Oz (1931).

He can only speak once every 15 minutes when the clock sounds and its cuckoo emerges with a note. The people of Menankypoo confined Clocker to Kadj the Conqueror's cave for "putting ideas in the former king's head." Clocker forms an alliance with Ruggedo in his latest plot to conquer the Land of Oz. This starts when they take advantage of the invading pirates and persuade them to side with Ruggedo. With help from Peter and Captain Salt, Princess Ozma thwarts the invasion and one of the things she does is keep Clocker so that he can be reprogrammed.

=== Comfortable Camel ===
The Comfortable Camel is a Bactrian camel who came to the Land of Oz in Thompson's The Royal Book of Oz (1921). He and his companion the Doubtful Dromedary got lost in a sandstorm and ended up in Oz near the Deadly Desert where they met Dorothy Gale. The two of them assisted Dorothy Gale, Cowardly Lion, and Sir Hokes of Pokes in searching for Scarecrow

=== Crunch ===
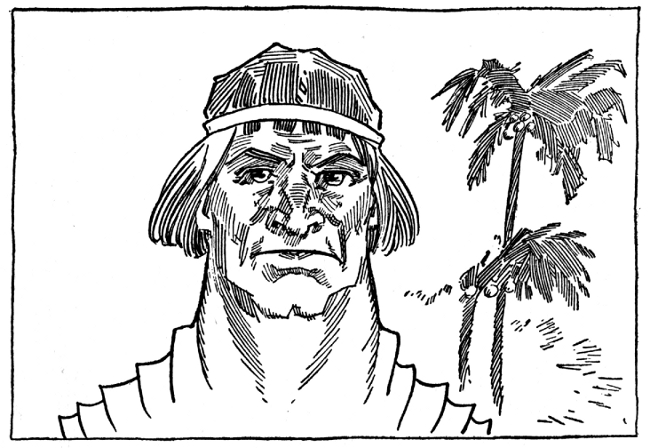
Crunch in The Cowardly Lion of Oz, illustrated by John R. Neill

Crunch is a gigantic stone man who appears in Thompson's The Cowardly Lion of Oz (1923). He was created by the wizard Wam during the early history of the Land of Oz. When Crunch came to life, he didn't know what to make of it, and stood still, watching the landscape and passersby, for over 1000 years.

Many years later, Crunch met Notta Bit More and the Cowardly Lion when they fell from the Skyle. He did join their party until he got impatient with the customs of non-magical beings. Crunch took the Cowardly Lion to Mustafa in Mudge so that Mustafa could add the Cowardly Lion to his collection of lions. Then Crunch recited a spell which turned the Cowardly Lion and Mustafa's collection of lions to stone. Glinda and the Wizard of Oz used their magic to freeze Crunch. Ozma states that Crunch's frozen body will remain in Mudge as her way to punish Mustafa.

=== Davy Jones ===
Davy Jones is a wooden whale who appears in Neill's Lucky Bucky in Oz (1942).

Davy Jones originally served as a ship for some pirates until he abandoned them on an island they attacked. He met Bucky Jones who stated that he is not a pirate and they traveled the ocean. They came across various obstacles when making their way to the Land of Oz. The Wizard of Oz later offered Davy Jones a job where he now resides in Lake Quad which is two miles south of the Emerald City.

Davy is popular among fans as one of Neill's more innovative and memorable creations, with his origin (unaddressed by Neill) being a popular matter for speculative guesswork. Due to copyright protection, Davy will not become available for other authors to use without special permission, until his novel enters the public domain on 1 January 2038.

=== Doubtful Dromedary ===
The Doubtful Dromedary is a dromedary who came to the Land of Oz in Thompson's The Royal Book of Oz (1921) and doubts everything that anyone says. He and his companion the Comfortable Camel got lost in a sandstorm and ended up in Oz near the Deadly Desert where they met Dorothy Gale. The two of them assisted Dorothy Gale, Cowardly Lion, and Sir Hokes of Pokes in searching for Scarecrow.

=== Handy Mandy ===
Handy Mandy is a goatherder who appears in Thompson's Handy Mandy in Oz (1937).

She comes from Mt. Mern somewhere in the eastern part of Nonestica where its inhabitants have seven arms. She described each of her hands to King Kerr and his nobles:

"This iron hand...I use for ironing, lifting hot pots from the stove and all horrid sort of work; this leather hand I keep for beating rugs, dusting, sweeping and so on; this wooden hand I use for churning and digging in the garden; these two red rubber hands for dishwashing and scrubbing, and my two fine white hands I keep for holding and braiding my hair."

A geyser transports Handy Mandy to Keretaria in Munchkin Country. After being reprieved from the dungeon by Nox the Royal Ox, Handy Mandy joins him in finding King Kerry, who is the rightful heir to Keretaria. They stumble upon a plot by the Wizard of Wutz to take over the Land of Oz even when Ruggedo is accidentally freed from his jar. When she strikes her silver hammer, she summons an elf named Himself who turns the Wizard of Wutz and Ruggedo into potted cacti. After order is restored by Ozma, Mandy is finally given gloves. After a month back on Mt. Mern, she uses a wishing pill given to her to bring herself and her goat herd to Keretaria to start a new life.

=== Herby ===
Herby is introduced in Thompson's 1928 novel, The Giant Horse of Oz, as a medical doctor who had been transformed into a bottle of cough syrup by Mombi. He is freed from his transformation by Prince Philidor of Ozure Isles early in the novel, but retained a three-shelf medicine chest in his chest and cough drop eyes, and by the end of the novel, was proclaimed the Court Physician in the Emerald City palace, although, because Ozites are almost never sick and cannot die of natural causes, he does not have much work to do, only treating occasional injuries.

Herby's name probably derives from the medicinal herbs that would have been contained in his chest. He appeared subsequently in Thompson's Jack Pumpkinhead of Oz, Ojo in Oz, The Wishing Horse of Oz, Handy Mandy in Oz, and Ozoplaning with the Wizard of Oz, although never in a prominent role.

Mark E. Haas (1952-2007) wrote a novel featuring Herby, The Medicine Man of Oz (2000). Due to copyright problems, the novel only enjoyed a limited circulation.

The entry of Herby and all other Giant Horse characters into the public domain in 2024, allows the chance for a reprint of Haas' novel, and use of Herby by other authors as well.

=== High Boy ===
High Boy is a giant horse introduced in Thompson's The Giant Horse of Oz (1928). He belongs to Joe King, the monarch of Up Town, and he has telescopic legs that enable him to grow to an astonishing height. He accompanies Prince Philador on his quest to find the good witch Tattypoo.

=== Sir Hokus of Pokes ===
Sir Hokus of Pokes is first introduced in Thompson's The Royal Book of Oz (1921). His name is a reference to hocus pocus. He is an elderly knight, who doesn't realise that he is obsolete, in the vein of Don Quixote. Sir Hokus was discovered in the kingdom of Pokes, where he had been snoring for several centuries. Pokes is a small, sleepy (literally) kingdom by the road in Winkie Country, by the Winkie River. After joining Dorothy, Cowardly Lion, Comfortable Camel, and Doubtful Dromedary on an adventure, Sir Hokus returns with her to live at the Palace in the Emerald City.

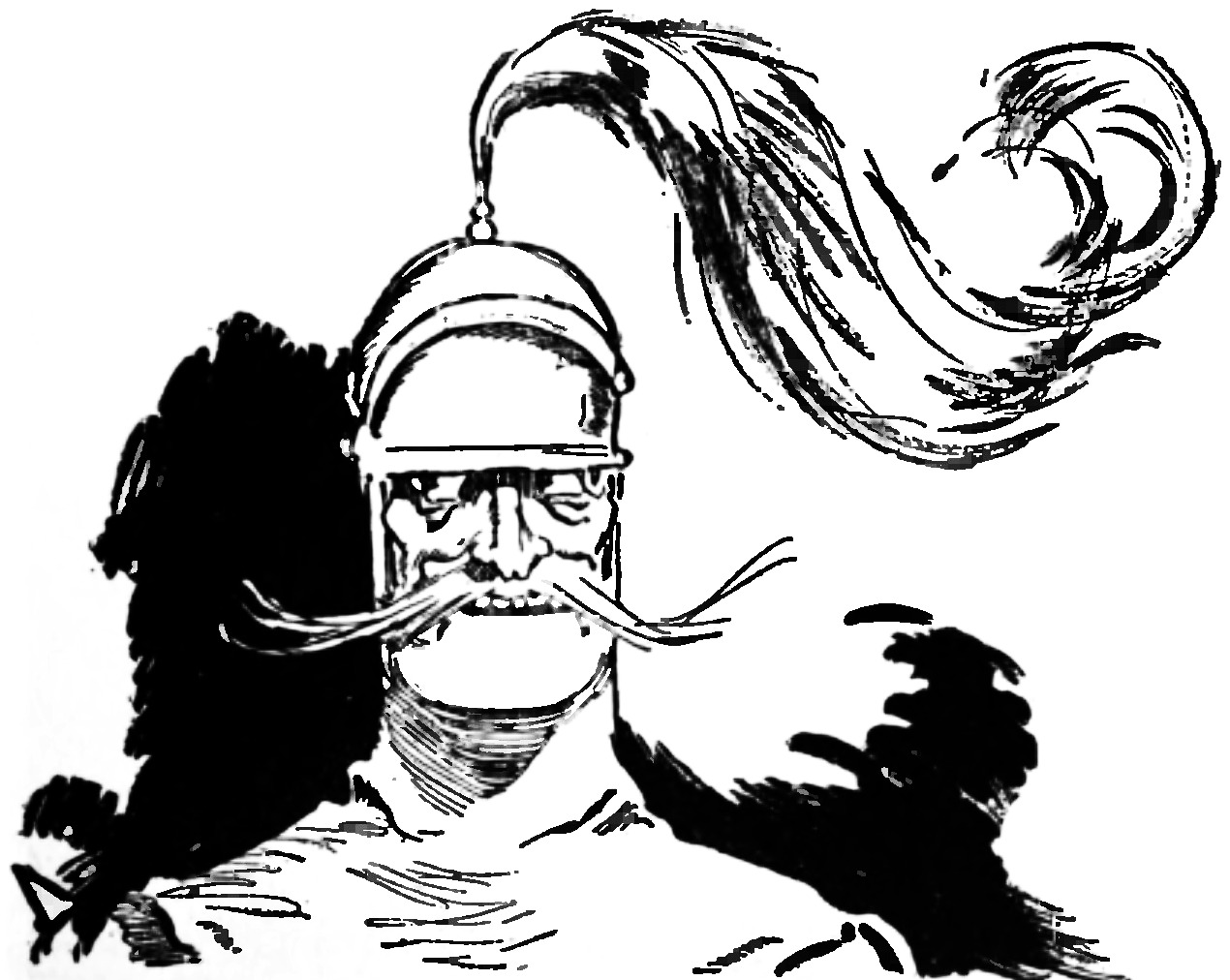
Sir Hokus as illustrated by John R. Neill for The Royal Book of Oz

In later books, he accompanies the main characters on several quests, and has a particularly significant adventure in Thompson's The Yellow Knight of Oz and marries Princess Marygolden of Corabia. In that book, we learn that his current state is the result of magic of the Sultan of Samandra, a kingdom between Corumbia and Corabia where animals cannot speak. His favorite steed, the Comfortable Camel is immediately stuck dumb upon entering it. At the end of the novel, he becomes the younger Corum, Prince of Corumbia, the Yellow Knight of Oz, struck with the pit of a magic date that turns his silver armor golden and transforms him into a young, blond-haired man. Although Sir Hokus's disenchantment changed his appearance significantly, after his initial identification as Corum, he was referred to as Sir Hokus for the rest of the book. He does, however, receive a new steed, Stampedro, whom Speedy frees from enchantment and who facilitates Hokus's restoration.

This character shift was met with negative reaction from the fan base, and Thompson is reported to have been planning away to undo this element. In John R. Neill's writing, Hokus tends to be back to his old self, such as in The Scalawagons of Oz, when he play-fights a two-headed Dragonette. Even Thompson showed him as his implicitly old self and referred to him as Sir Hokus in a brief appearance in the Emerald City in Yankee in Oz (1972).

The entry of his first appearance into the public domain in 1997 made Hokus freely available to be used by other authors.

In an episode of the 2017 series Dorothy and the Wizard of Oz, he is voiced by Tom Kenny.

=== Humpy ===
Humpy is a live test dummy that appears in Thompson's The Lost King of Oz (1925).

He was originally in Hollywood until Dorothy briefly arrived and brought him to the Land of Oz. After escaping the Back-woodsmen of the Back Woods, the two of them run into Kabumpo who carries them on his back. Humpy, Dorothy, and Kabumpo come across Mombi, Snip, Tora, and Pajuka where it was thought that Humpy was the long-lost King Pastoria. After it was discovered that Tora is actually King Pastoria and he allows his daughter Princess Ozma to continue ruling the Emerald City, King Pastoria started a tailor shop in the Emerald City with Humpy working as his tailor's dummy.

=== Jam ===
Jonathan Andrew Manley, nicknamed "Jam", is a boy from Ohio who is the son of a biologist and first appears in Rachel Cosgrove Payes' The Hidden Valley of Oz (1951). He alongside two guinea pigs and a laboratory rat (Percy) arrived in Gillikin Country on a large collapsible kite. After escaping from Terp the Terrible, Jam befriended Dorothy, Scarecrow, Tin Man, Cowardly Lion, and Hungry Tiger who agreed to help him against Terp the Terrible. They even get a new party member in the form of the Leopard with the Changeable Spots. After Terp the Terrible is defeated, Jam attends a celebratory banquet before he is returned to Ohio by Princess Ozma and the Wizard of Oz.

While Payes brought Percy the rat back for further appearances, Jam never appeared again in her work.

Jam is a main character in The Blue Emperor of Oz (1966) by Henry Blossom, which enjoyed a limited circulation due to copyright issues.

=== Jenny Jump ===
Jenny Jump is an important character in the Oz books of John R. Neill, beginning with The Wonder City of Oz in 1940. Living in New Jersey at the time, Neill named her after Jenny Jump Mountain.

Jenny begins as a fifteen-year-old in New Jersey, who one day finds a leprechaun stealing her cheese. She is clever enough to capture him with her stare, so that the leprechaun, called Siko Pompus must grant her a wish. She wishes to become a fairy, and the leprechaun transforms her. In the midst of this psychedelia, however, Jenny's gaze falters, and the leprechaun eludes her control, leaving her part-fairy and part-human. Still, Jenny has remarkable new abilities. With her fairy foot, she leaps all the way to the Land of Oz, to begin her adventures.

Jenny is not a fan of the traditional, single-color fashions favored by the Ozites, and she sets up a shop with a magic turnstile that dresses people according to their personalities.

Jenny is regularly accompanied by a Munchkin boy called Number Nine, who loves her even though she treats him like a slave during the first book. She has him wear whistling breeches that alert her to his presence.

In The Scalawagons of Oz (1941), Jenny is again a main character, when she joins the trans-Oz search for the stolen magical cars. In Lucky Bucky in Oz (1942), she is one of the planners of the grand Emerald City gala, but is only a background character, while Number Nine is a more prominent actor in the plot. In The Runaway in Oz, whose publication was delayed over a half-century after the author's death, Jenny helps get the story started by quarreling with Scraps the Patchwork Girl; but once Scraps runs away, Jenny spends the rest of the book helping to look for her.

As Jenny is a copyrighted character, she is not found in modern Oz expanded universe stories, save Oziana magazine.

=== Jinnicky the Red Jinn ===
Jinnicky the Red Jinn is a character who frequently appears in Ruth Plumly Thompson's Oz books. He first appeared as "the Red Jinn" in Jack Pumpkinhead of Oz (1929), and was reintroduced as "Jinnicky" in The Purple Prince of Oz (1932). He is depicted as a character who owns a lot of slaves and has his red body enclosed in a ginger jar. For long-distance travel he uses a magic jinriskishka. He maintains a friendly but sincere rivalry with the Wizard of Oz and is anxious to stop Faleero in "The Purple Prince of Oz" before the Wizard of Oz does.

=== Kabumpo ===
Kabumpo is an Indian elephant who appears in several of the Ruth Plumly Thompson Oz books, including a titular role in Kabumpo in Oz (1922). He is called the "Elegant Elephant", because of his grand demeanour and fine adornments. He's a bit of a snob, really, but good-hearted, and he makes many friends in the Oz stories. In Kabumpo in Oz, he helps Prince Pompa to find a princess to marry, and he returns for more adventures in The Lost King of Oz (1925) and The Purple Prince of Oz (1932).

=== King Ato the Eighth ===
King Ato the Eighth ruled the tiny Octagon Island, and was content with having a small kingdom, as long as his companion Roger the Read Bird would read him stories. When Peter Brown and Captain Salt visited his island in Thompson's Pirates in Oz (1931), King Ato was seized with a desire to travel aboard Captain Salt's ship. He signed on as the ship's cook, which he was surprisingly good at. King Ato returned for another voyage on board the ship in another Thompson book, Captain Salt in Oz (1936).

=== King Kinda Jolly ===
King Kinda Jolly of Kimbaloo is a character in Thompson's The Lost King of Oz (1925). The short and stout king of Kimbaloo, is a jolly little Gillikin in the kingdom known for its button trees and the crops they provide. Kinda Jolly wears a silver crown to match his silver beard, and is married to the sweet little Queen, Rosa Merry. He is the leader of the 249 other male citizens of Kimbaloo, and in charge of the button crops. He loves his people dearly and is loved by them. He once hired the witch Mombi as a cook in his palace, against the advice of Hah Hoh, the town laugher of the kingdom, since he took pity on the friendless old woman, and did not know she was, in fact, a former witch.

== L–S ==
=== Leopard with the Changeable Spots ===
The Leopard with the Changeable Spots, nicknamed "Spots", is a leopard that lives in an unnamed jungle in Gillikin Country as seen in Rachel Cosgrove's The Hidden Valley of Oz (1951). He gets his name from the markings on his coat which change, both randomly and in response to his feelings. They shift "from pink diamonds, to violet hearts, to spinning pinwheels; and so on and on...from golden snow flakes to silver crosses," plus "green apples" and "pink elephants," "red dots" and "big, black exclamation marks," "blue moons" and "electric lights." When he's in doubt, he produces "blue question marks," and when he is angry he has "brightly colored swords and muskets spinning madly on his back." It's because of his uniqueness that he is considered an outcast to his fellow leopards. Dorothy's group befriend the Leopard with the Changeable Spots where they nickname him "Spots". He joins them on their quest to defeat Terp the Terrible.

=== Mooj ===
Mooj is a "bent and hideous" old Munchkin magician who appears in Thompson's Ojo in Oz (1933).

He usurped the throne of Seebania and dwells in a clock-filled hut on Moojer Mountain. It took Princess Ozma, Realbad, and the Wizard of Oz to defeat Mooj. Princess Ozma turned him into a drop of water that is sent into the Nonestic Ocean.

=== Notta Bit More ===
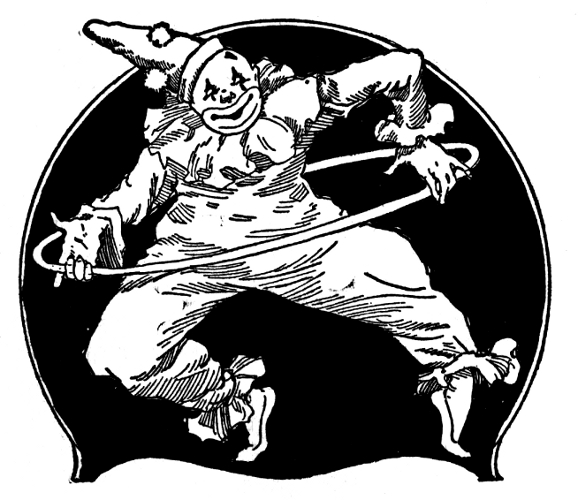
Notta Bit More in The Cowardly Lion of Oz, illustrated by John R. Neill

Notta Bit More is a circus clown from North America.

He first appears in Thompson's The Cowardly Lion of Oz (1923) where he stumbles upon a magic phrase that sends him and a little orphan boy named Bobby Downs (also called Bob Up) to the Munchkin Country kingdom of Mudge. King Mustafa wanted them to bring the Cowardly Lion to him. When the two of them met the Cowardly Lion, he joined their party alongside a bird named Nickadoodle as she fell in love with Notta. When King Mustafa has been defeated by Princess Ozma and her allies, Notta Bit More accepted Princess Ozma's offer to live in the Land of Oz where he resides in a tent outside the Royal Palace. He also adopts the orphan Bob.

Notta Bit More appears in the 1985 film Return to Oz. He is seen in the background at the coronation scene at the end.

=== Peg Amy ===
Peg Amy is a wooden doll from Thompson's Kabumpo in Oz (1922) who is revealed to be the long-lost princess of Sun Top Mountain in Winkie Country. After being freed from her enchantment, Peg Amy married Prince Pompadore and they ruled Sun Top Mountain together, though they spent part of their time in his father's kingdom, Pumperdink. In Thompson's The Purple Prince of Oz they have a daughter named Pajonia, making Peg the only named human in Oz to have given birth in the "present day" of Ruth Plumly Thompson's stories.

=== Percy ===
Percy is a laboratory rat from Ohio who debuts in Rachel Cosgrove Payes' The Hidden Valley of Oz (1951). He came to the Land of Oz with Jam and two guinea pigs where they landed in Gillikin Country. At different points when it comes to the quest to defeat Terp the Terrible, Percy ate some of Terp the Terrible's special muffins that caused him to grow 10 times his usual size. After Terp the Terrible was defeated and Jam was sent back to Ohio, Percy persuaded the Wizard of Oz to permanently enlarge him. Percy has a "smart aleck" personality, frequently referring to everyone he meets as "kiddo."

In Payes' The Wicked Witch of Oz (1993), Percy accompanied Dorothy Gale when the Wicked Witch of the South awakens from her long slumber.

In the early 1990s, Payes was interviewed by The Baum Bugle in preparation for a rerelease of Hidden Valley and the first edition of the hitherto unpublished Wicked Witch. She explained that many of Percy's more bizarre traits, such as the "kiddos," were added in by Reilly & Lee editors without her consent, in an attempt to make the book more relevant with the slang of 1951.

=== Peter Brown ===
Peter Brown is a boy from Philadelphia and protagonist of several Oz books by Ruth Plumly Thompson. He is first introduced in The Gnome King of Oz (1927), and reappears in Jack Pumpkinhead of Oz (1929) and Pirates in Oz (1931). The first and third of these feature Ruggedo the Nome King as the primary antagonist, while Pumpkinhead pits Peter and Jack against a "Red Baron" who seeks to invade and conquer the feudal domains of his neighbors before marching on the Emerald City. Peter's athleticism, as an ace pitcher in little league baseball, often comes into play in defeating obstacles.

Peter entered the public domain on January 1, 2023, with subsequent appearances scheduled to be become available for other authors to use on January 1, 2025 and 2027.

=== Pigasus ===
Pigasus is a flying pig who first appears in Thompson's Pirates in Oz (1931). As with Pegasus, his riders gained the gift of poesy, being magically compelled to speak in rhyming jingles while on his back. The character also played a major role in Thompson's The Wishing Horse of Oz (1935).

=== Pinny and Gig ===
Pinny and Gig are two guinea pigs from Ohio who debut in Rachel Cosgrove Payes' The Hidden Valley of Oz (1951). They came with Jam and Percy to the Land of Oz where Jam's kite landed in Gillikin country. After escaping from Terp the Terrible's castle, Pinny and Gig did not have the taste for adventure and moved in with a farmer and his wife who allowed Jam to stay at their farm for the night.

=== Prince Pompadore ===
Prince Pompadore (called Pompa for short) is the prince of Pumperdink who first appears in Thompson's Kabumpo in Oz (1922). He is the son of King Pompus. Kabumpo the Elephant is his mentor and bodyguard. The plot focuses on Kabumpo and Pompa as they search for the "proper princess" described in a disturbing prophecy delivered to the Pumperdink palace. After many slapstick-filled misadventures, Pompa finds his intended mate, Princess Peg Amy of Suntop Mountain. While Kabumpo becomes a mainstay in Thompson's work, Pompa fades into the background, with his "niche" in the Kabumpo adventures taken by Randy of Regalia. Pompadore appears in Thompson's The Purple Prince of Oz ten years later when his family is kidnapped by the wicked fairy Faleero, he and Peg Amy are shown to have a daughter, Pajonia, giving Pompa the distinction of being the only human character explicitly stated to have fathered a child during the "present day" portions of Thompson's Oz books.

=== Rattlesnake ===
The Rattlesnake is a snake made of 100 rattles who is the A-B-Sea Serpent's companion.

First appearing in Thompson's The Royal Book of Oz (1921), the A-B-Sea Serpent and the Rattlesnake were on vacation in the Munchkin River where they encounter the Scarecrow. After A-B-Sea Serpent helped Scarecrow cross the Munchkin River, he invited A-B-Sea Serpent and Rattlesnake to the Emerald City to meet Princess Ozma, Betsy Bobbin, Patchwork Girl, and Tin Woodman.

=== Realbad ===
Realbad is a tall, strong, and handsome man who appears in Thompson's Ojo in Oz (1933).

He is the chieftain of a bandit gang in Munchkin Country. He is later revealed to be Ree Alla Bad, the rightful King of Seebania, Ojo's father, and nephew of Unc Nuckie.

=== Robin Brown ===
Robin Brown is the protagonist of Eloise Jarvis McGraw's Merry Go Round in Oz (1963). He is a small boy raised by an adoptive family of large boys who mistreat him before he escapes to Oz on Merry Go Round, a living Merry Go Round horse. He becomes King of Roundabout for a short time against his will.

=== Roger the Read Bird ===
Roger the Read Bird is a servant and companion to King Ato the Eighth of Octagon Island, who was originally employed to read books to the king. When King Ato met up with Peter and Captain Salt in Thompson's Pirates in Oz (1931), both the king and his faithful bird eagerly joined the Captain's crew. Roger returned for another voyage, in Thompson's Captain Salt in Oz (1936).

=== Snif ===
Snif is a character who appears in Thompson's Jack Pumpkinhead of Oz (1929).

Snif is an -iffin which is a doggerel-spouting griffin that lost its "gr." He first appears where he joins up with Peter Brown and Jack Pumpkinhead. Snif, Peter, and Jack later meet Baron Belfaygore and help in rescuing his fiancé Shirley Sunshine from Mogodore the Mighty. After Mogodore is defeated, Snif regains his "gr" and becomes a griffin again.

=== Snip ===
Snip is a boy who appears in Thompson's The Lost King of Oz (1925). He was captured by Mombi to aid her and Pajuku in finding King Pastoria. When traversing through Blankenberg, the three of them met an amnesiac tailor named Tora who joins them on their quest. When Dorothy, Humpy, and Kabumpo meet up with them, Snip is among those who thought that Humpy was the enchanted form of King Pastoria. It turns out that Tora was actually the enchanted form of King Pastoria. After King Pastoria allows his daughter Princess Ozma to continue ruling the Emerald City, he became a tailor where Snip became his apprentice.

=== Snufferbux ===
Snufferbux, full name, Snufforious Buxorious Blundorious Boroso, is a bear who appears in Thompson's Ojo in Oz (1933). A group of gypsies captured Snufferbux with a bucket of honey and used him to perform for them. He gained his freedom when he fell in with Ojo and Realbad. Snufferbux accompanied them in their journey across Munchkin Country. After Mooj is defeated, Ozma provided Snufferbux with satisfaction by having the gypsies that captured him exiled from the Land of Oz.

=== Speedy ===
Speedy is the protagonist of Thompson's The Yellow Knight of Oz (1930) and Speedy in Oz (1934). He is the nephew of William J. Harmstead, an eccentric inventor from Long Island, who raised Speedy after his parents were killed in a maritime accident in the South Seas. Speedy's first name appears to be William as well, although whether he shares his uncle's surname is unclear. He first comes to Oz when Uncle Billy's rocket ship, which Speedy was test-piloting, flies out of control. Landing in the underground nation of Subterranea, Speedy escapes to the surface and finds himself in the Winkie Country, where he joins a quest to rescue the kingdom of the Yellow Knight from an evil enchantment. Four years later, Speedy and Uncle are on a paleontological expedition in Wyoming, where a magic geyser brings a large dinosaur skeleton to life. Speedy and the dinosaur (named Terrybubble after a stuttering exclamation which Speedy made impulsively) land on Umbrella Island as it flies through the sky, and Speedy soon discovers an insidious plot to kidnap Gureeda, the island king's daughter, with whom Speedy is beginning to fall in love.

Copyright has made it difficult for other authors to use Speedy. His first novel entered the public domain on 1 January 2026.

== T–Z ==
=== Terrybubble ===
Terrybubble is a living dinosaur skeleton that appears in Thompson's Speedy in Oz (1934). He comes to life when an underground geyser shoots him and Speedy into the air, and the loyal dino accompanies Speedy on his adventures on Umbrella Island.

=== Wag ===
Wag is a rabbit who appeared in Thompson's Kabumpo in Oz (1922). He was bribed by Ruggedo the Nome King into being his servant, but when Ruggedo disappears and Wag magically grows in size, he happily joins Kabumpo and Prince Pompadore in their quest to stop the wicked Nome.

=== Witch of the North ===
The Witch of the North was not named in The Wonderful Wizard of Oz nor was she named in any of Baum's Oz books. However, Baum gave her the name of Locasta in the 1902 musical extravaganza, The Wizard of Oz. Ruth Plumly Thompson revamped the character and gave her the name of Tattypoo in Thompson's The Giant Horse of Oz (1928).

This version may or may not be the same as Baum's Good Witch of the North.

=== X. Pando ===
X. Pando is a tall man with accordion-like legs who appears in Thompson's Ojo in Oz (1933).

X. Pando is an elevator man who lifts people to the top of Moojer Mountain. The payment is something minor like a brief dance. Though it isn't certain how much traffic he bears.

=== Zif ===
Zif is a Munchkin who appears in Thompson's The Royal Book of Oz (1921). He is a student at Wogglebug's College of Art and Athletic Perfection.

== See also ==
- List of Oz characters (created by Baum)
- List of Wicked characters
