= The Giant Horse of Oz =

1928 novel

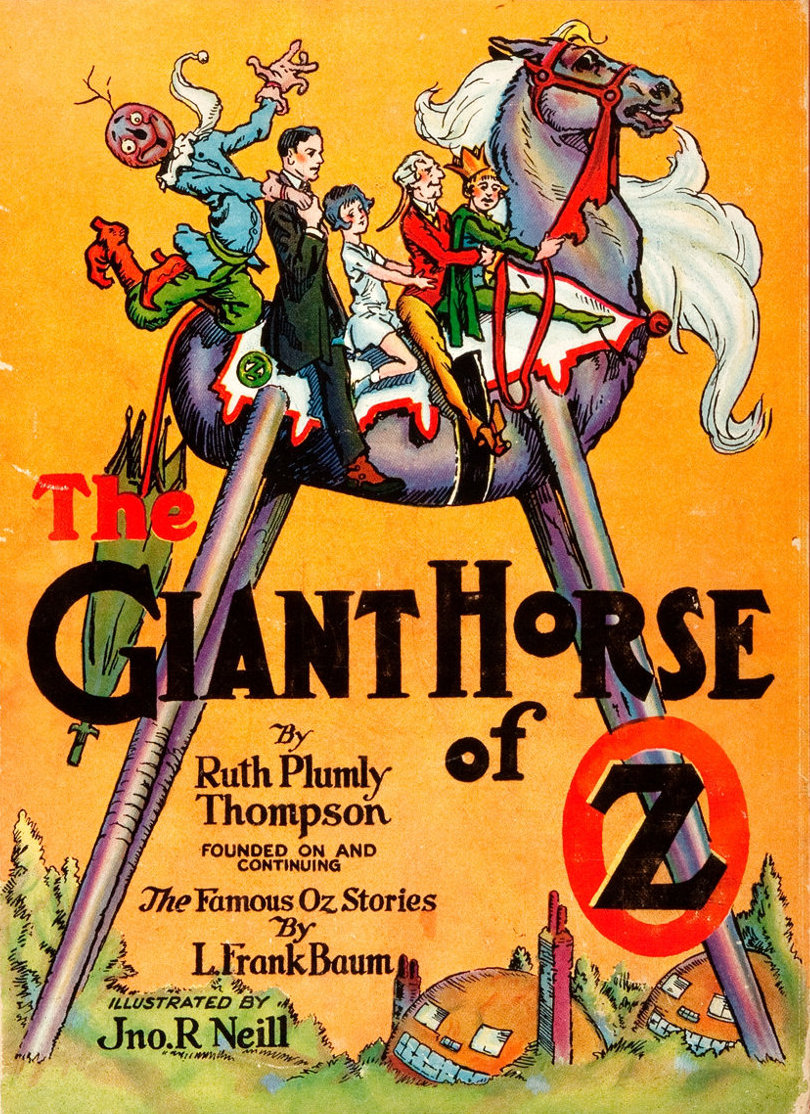
- Cover of The Giant Horse of Oz.
- Author: Ruth Plumly Thompson
- Illustrator: John R. Neill
- Language: English
- Series: The Oz books
- Genre: Children's novel
- Publisher: Reilly & Lee
- Publication date: May, 1928
- Publication place: United States
- Media type: Print (hardcover)
- Pages: 283
- Preceded by: The Gnome King of Oz
- Followed by: Jack Pumpkinhead of Oz

The Giant Horse of Oz (1928) is the twenty-second book in the Oz series created by L. Frank Baum and his successors, and the eighth written by Ruth Plumly Thompson. It was illustrated by John R. Neill. The novel was followed by Jack Pumpkinhead of Oz (1929).

== Plot ==
The tiny kingdom of the Ozure Isles, perched on five islands in Lake Orizon, surrounded by high mountains in a remote region of Munchkin Land, has little contact with the outside world—of Oz. The evil witch Mombi has turned her malice in the Ozure direction. After kidnapping Queen Orin, Mombi has left a fire-breathing lake monster named Quiberon in Lake Orizon to keep the natives prisoner. Even after Mombi was vanquished, Quiberon remains.

Conditions grow worse when Quiberon orders the Ozurites to kidnap a mortal maiden to keep him company. Since Oz is a fairyland, the only mortal maidens are three American girls living in the Emerald City: Dorothy Gale, Betsy Bobbin, and Tiny Trot. Two Ozurites respond to the crisis in two separate ways. The heroic Prince Philador escapes from the islands to seek the aid of the Good Witch of the North, whose name is Tattypoo. The unheroic Akbad, the Ozure Isles soothsayer, steals a pair of magic wings, flies to the Emerald City, and kidnaps Trot. He also accidentally kidnaps the Scarecrow and an animated statue called Benny (short for "public benefactor") along with Trot.

In his search for Tattypoo, Prince Philador teams up with High Boy, a giant horse with telescoping legs, Herby the Medicine Man, an eighteenth-century doctor with a medicine chest in his own chest due to an incomplete disenchantment, and Jo King, a monarch with a sense of humor. Various adventures ensue, in strange locations like Cave City, and with even stranger beings like the Roundabouties and Shutterfaces. Eventually, matters are sorted out satisfactorily: the Wizard turns Quiberon into a great bronze and silver statue, and the good Witch Tattypoo is revealed to be the missing and amnesiac Queen Orin. She is restored to her family and kingdom. Trot becomes a princess of the Ozure Isles, welcome in their Sapphire City whenever she chooses to visit. By Ozma's decree, Jo King is made ruler of the entire Gillikin Country of Oz.

== Reception ==
The Oakland Tribune said that the book "is fully as entertaining and delightful as any" in the Oz series, adding, "Perhaps it is a bit more marvelous." The Spokane Chronicle said the book was "written in an entertaining and easily read style."

== Copyright status ==
The Giant Horse of Oz, and all characters therein, entered the public domain on January 1, 2024.

The Oz books
Previous book: The Gnome King of Oz	The Giant Horse of Oz; 1928	Next book: Jack Pumpkinhead of Oz
