= Jack Pumpkinhead of Oz =

1929 book by Ruth Plumly Thompson

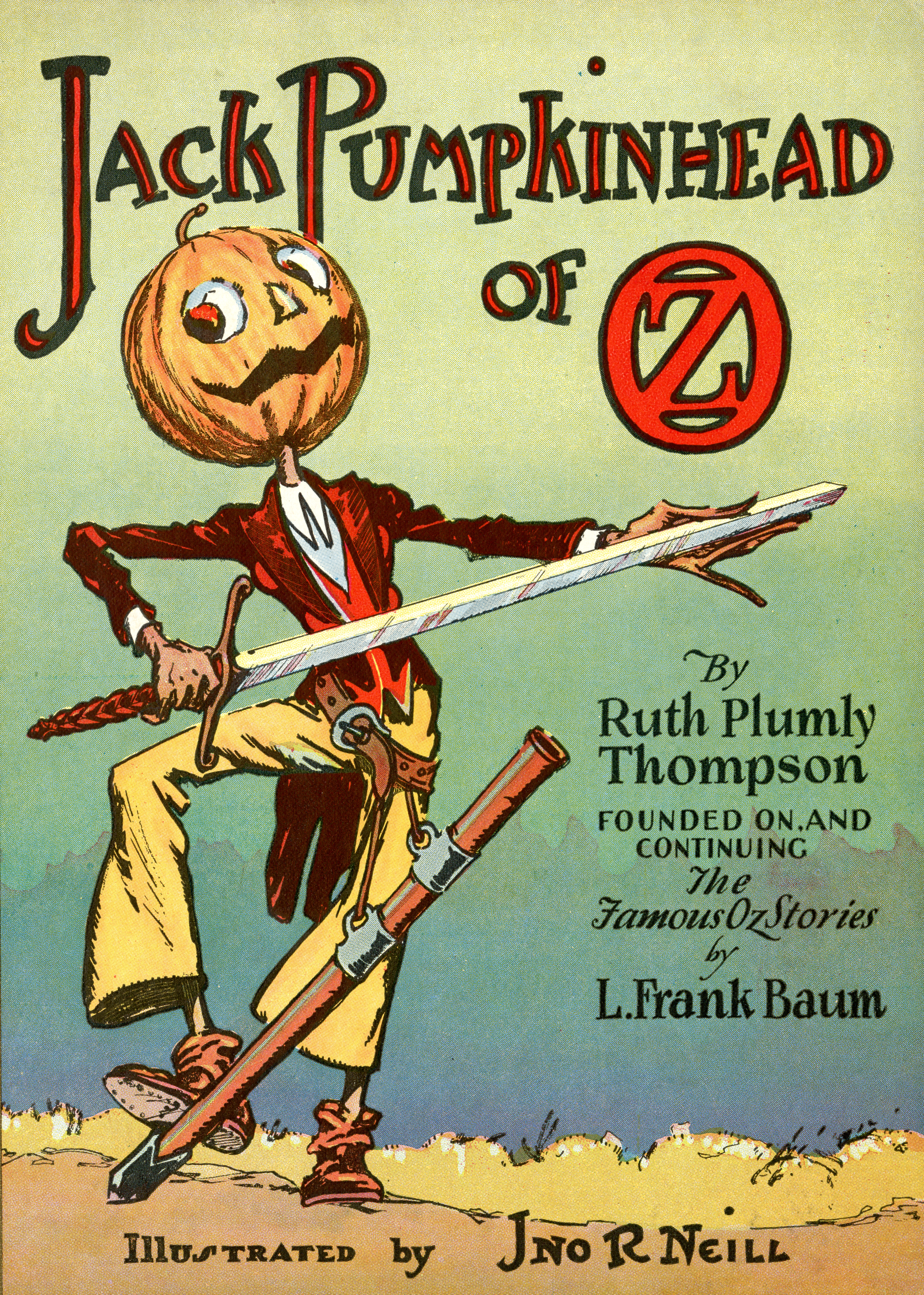
- Cover of Jack Pumpkinhead of Oz.
- Author: Ruth Plumly Thompson
- Illustrator: John R. Neill
- Language: English
- Series: The Oz Books
- Genre: Children's novel
- Publisher: Reilly & Lee
- Publication date: 1929
- Publication place: United States
- Media type: Print (Hardcover)
- Pages: 252
- Preceded by: The Giant Horse of Oz
- Followed by: The Yellow Knight of Oz

Jack Pumpkinhead of Oz (1929) is the twenty-third book in the Oz series created by L. Frank Baum and continued by other writers; it is the ninth Oz book written by Ruth Plumly Thompson. It was illustrated by John R. Neill. The novel was followed by The Yellow Knight of Oz (1930).

== Synopsis ==
A rainy day in Philadelphia means no baseball; Peter Brown, the child protagonist introduced by Thompson in The Gnome King of Oz, mopes in his attic. He finds the sacks that were full of gold when he brought them back from his previous Oz adventure; and one of those sacks contains an odd gold coin. Toying with the coin and thinking of Oz, he wishes himself back in the magic land — and suddenly finds himself there, in the front yard of Jack Pumpkinhead.

The sensible thing for Peter to do is to head for the Emerald City; and Jack is ready to act as his guide. They lose their way in the Quadling Country, where they blunder into Chimneyville and Scare City. By chance, Peter finds that his empty sack will fly from his hand and consume objects and creatures that are scooped into its open mouth, protecting him from danger. The two also find the magic dinner bell of Jinnicky the Red Jinn, which supplies Peter with needed provisions.

The travelers adopt a third member for their party when they meet the doggerel-spouting Snif the Iffin (he's a griffin who has lost his "gr-" and is no longer able to growl). The three then encounter the unfortunate Baron Belfaygor of Bourne. He has been accidentally cursed with a rapidly growing beard that he must constantly cut away. Even worse, his fiancée, the princess Shirley Sunshine, has been kidnapped by the local villain, Mogodore the Mighty, the Baron of Baffleburg. Belfaygor had wanted a beard to have for his wedding to Shirley.

Peter, Belfaygor, Snif, and Jack set out to rescue her, and are quickly taken prisoner in Baffleburg. While escaping, they acquire a Forbidden Flagon and a talkative and abusive Sauce Box. When Mogodore sets out to conquer Oz and actually succeeds in seizing the Emerald City, the travelers have to mount a desperate rescue effort. Eventually Jack, with help from the Red Jinn (here introduced for the first time; his name, Jinnicky, is not revealed until later books), manages to save the day: using the Forbidden Flagon, he reduces Mogodore and his thousand warriors to little beings "no bigger than brownies."

The miniaturized aggressors are confined to their homeland, also miniaturized. Snif the Iffin recovers his lost "gr-." The rapid-growing beard enchantment on Belfaygor is removed by the Wizard of Oz as he finally marries Shirley Sunshine. Order in Oz is restored, with a great celebratory banquet before Peter is sent home, with thanks, once again.

== Reception ==
The Pasadena Post referred to Jack's adventures as "strange and wonderful", and mentioned the Iffin as "one of the most curious and remarkable creatures ever discovered in Oz." The Detroit Free Press commended the illustrations, saying, "John R. Neill illustrates the book with pictures as fantastic as the events themselves." The Montreal Gazette promised, "The coming Christmas will be a breath-taking adventure for children to whom Santa Claus presents this book."

== Copyright status ==
Jack Pumpkinhead of Oz, and all characters therein, entered the public domain on January 1, 2025.

The Oz books
Previous book: The Giant Horse of Oz	Jack Pumpkinhead of Oz; 1929	Next book: The Yellow Knight of Oz
