= The Wonderful Land of Oz =

- Theatrical release poster
- Directed by: Barry Mahon
- Written by: Barry Mahon
- Based on: The Marvelous Land of Oz by L. Frank Baum
- Produced by: Barry Mahon
- Starring: Channy Mahon; Zisca Baum; Caroline Berner; George Wadsworth
- Cinematography: Barry Mahon
- Edited by: Steve Cuiffo
- Music by: George Linsenmann
- Production companies: Childhood Productions; Cinetron
- Distributed by: Childhood Productions
- Release date: October 31, 1969
- Running time: 71 minutes
- Country: United States
- Language: English

The Wonderful Land of Oz is a 1969 American film directed by Barry Mahon. It is a low budget but faithful adaptation of the 1904 novel The Marvelous Land of Oz by L. Frank Baum.

== Plot ==
When Tip's witch guardian Mombi threatens to granitize him, Tip evades Mombi and flees to the Emerald City with his recently animated companion, Jack Pumpkinhead. Along the way, he meets up with General Jinjur, leader of the Army of Revolt, who imprisons Tip and marches her troops to take over the Emerald City. Tip escapes to warn the Scarecrow, now the ruler of the city, and together they leave to find the Tin Woodman and assemble their own army.

== Cast ==
- Chandos Castle Mahon (credited as Channy Mahon) as Tip
- Zisca Baum as Mombi
- Caroline Berner as General Jinjur
- George Wadsworth as Jack Pumpkinhead
- Gil Fields as H. M. Woggle-bug T. E.
- Michael R. Thomas as the Scarecrow
- Al Joseph as the Tin Woodman
- Joy Webb as Ozma
- Hilary Lee Gaess as Glinda
- Ray Menard as The Gump (voice)

Jellia Jamb and Omby Amby also appear but are uncredited.

== Differences from the novel ==
Characters and incidents difficult to stage are left out, including the Sawhorse, the river crossing, the Jackdaws, the Wishing Pills, the Sunflowers, and the Griffin. The Field Mice are represented by a single white rat who does not speak. The Gump appears but its screen time is minimal.

The Soldier with the Green Whiskers and the Guardian of the Gates are combined into a single unnamed character. This conflation was originally done by Jack Snow in the novel The Magical Mimics in Oz (1946), in which case it was a continuity error, and has been done deliberately by some more recent film adaptations, including Oz the Great and Powerful.

In an apparent plot hole, Jack Pumpkinhead, speaking shortly after his "birth," knows that although Mombi enlivened him, Tip built him, and thus he considers Tip his father. By this point in the story, neither Tip nor Mombi had told him about his origin.

The Emerald City appears to have a population of exactly three (The Scarecrow, Omby Amby, and Jellia Jamb) prior to Jack Pumpkinhead's arrival.

The younger female characters, such as Jinjur and Jellia Jamb, wear 1960s miniskirts and go-go boots, and have then-fashionable haircuts. The "girlish" grievances of the Army of Revolt, set in the context of suffragettes in the 1904 novel, have been updated to include "homework" and "babysitting," and they are played as typical "rebellious teenage" stock characters of 1969.

The most radical departure comes at the end, when Tip's spiritual essence flies away to dwell in all the boys in the land, leaving an amnesiac Ozma who has no memory of the whole adventure. The idea that Tip and Ozma could exist as separate entities originated in Jack Snow's short piece "A Murder in Oz," published posthumously in 1958, and has been recycled by other authors.

== Production ==
Mahon told Variety that he was planning to get Judy Garland to narrate, but eventually she did not. A popular rumor is that Jinjur's Army of Revolt is composed of actors who had previously appeared in Mahon's nudie films. This is, however, not the case. The nudie films were made in New York City, while the children's films were made in Florida. Mahon did not bring any of his former performers to appear in the film.

According to Michael R. Thomas, Hilary Lee Gaess, the actress who played Glinda, had extreme bouts of stage fright.

Mahon and songwriters Linsenmann and Falco re-teamed for Jack and the Beanstalk and Thumbelina, both released in 1970. All three films are owned by Jeffrey C. Hogue.

=== Music ===
- "The Land of Oz" - Chorus
- "The Powder of Life" - Mombi and Tip
- "I Don't Want to Be a Statue" - Tip
- "Try to Touch a Star" - Glinda
- "On This Great Take Over Day" - Jinjur and Army
- "I've Watched Over You" - Glinda
- "The Land of Oz" (reprise) - Chorus

Another oft-repeated error is the claim that the songs are by Loonis McGlohan and Alec Wilder. This is derived from the fact that they wrote music for the Land of Oz theme park in Banner Elk, North Carolina, released on a vinyl record titled The Land of Oz. Their songs were inspired by The Wonderful Wizard of Oz, not The Marvelous Land of Oz. The songs for the film were composed by George Linsenmann with lyrics by Ralph Falco.

== Release ==
The Wonderful Land of Oz played in Saturday "kiddie matinee" venues, but was not released on VHS until after it had been issued on DVD, making it something of a lost and often misreported legend. Some sources, such as Allan Eyles's 1985 book, The World of Oz, claim that Dorothy Gale accompanied Tip on his journey in this film, but this is not the case. (It is, coincidentally, the case in Ozu no Mahōtsukai from 1986.)

The film was released on VHS in 2001 and DVD in 2002, as a double feature with Jack and the Beanstalk, by Something Weird Video. That it remained unavailable on any home media until the 21st century may explain the rumors published by Eyles and others. RiffTrax released a comedy commentary track in 2017.

== See also ==
- List of American films of 1969
- Santa and the Ice Cream Bunny
