= Jellia Jamb =

- Oz character
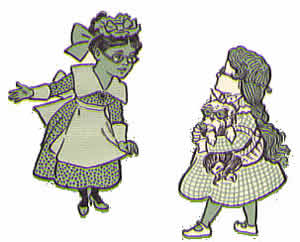
- Jellia Jamb welcomes Dorothy and Toto to the Emerald City in The Wonderful Wizard of Oz (1900). --illustration by W.W. Denslow
- First appearance: The Wonderful Wizard of Oz (1900) (unnamed); The Marvelous Land of Oz (1904) (named)
- Created by: L. Frank Baum

In-universe information
- Species: Human
- Gender: female
- Occupation: head of Emerald City staff and personal attendant to Ozma
- Nationality: Gillikin

Jellia Jamb is a fictional character from the classic children's series of Oz books by American author L. Frank Baum. She is first introduced in The Wonderful Wizard of Oz (1900), as the head maid who works in the royal palace of the Emerald City which is the imperial capital of the Land of Oz. In later books, Jellia eventually becomes Princess Ozma's favorite servant out of the Emerald City's staff administration. She is also the protagonist of Ruth Plumly Thompson's 1939 novel Ozoplaning with the Wizard of Oz. Her name is a pun on the phrase "Jelly or jam?"

== Classic Oz books ==
Jellia Jamb is a character in the Oz Books by L Frank Baum and she lives in The Emerald City where everything there is green (everything just looks green because the people there in the Emerald City wear a pair of green spectacles so they think that the Emerald City is green when it is really not) She is introduced (though unnamed), in The Wonderful Wizard of Oz (1900), and is described as having pretty green hair and green eyes. She wears a green silk dress with green satin sashes and a green apron. In the novel, she is the young and charming maid who immediately responds to the Soldier with the Green Whiskers after he blows upon his green whistle, informing the staff that guests have arrived at the royal palace in the Emerald City. She handles the separate rooms of Dorothy, the Scarecrow, Tin Woodman, and Cowardly Lion during their stay and upon their first visit to the city to see the great Wizard. She leads Dorothy through seven hallways and up three grand staircases to her private chambers, and even provides the little girl with a fancy green dress made of brocaded satin. She also adorns Dorothy's pet dog Toto with a green silk ribbon she ties around his neck (both Dorothy's dress and Toto's ribbon become pure white upon leaving the Emerald City. This is because of the green tinted spectacles the city citizens are forced to wear by the Guardian of the Gates to protect their eyes from being blinded by the city's brilliancy). Her character is strictly referred to as "the pretty green girl" in this story, and her youthfulness and kindness are emphasized by Baum.

She is finally introduced by name in the second Oz book, The Marvelous Land of Oz (1904), where Baum elaborates more about her appearance in detail. She often wears a green silk knee-length skirt, matching silk stockings embroidered with peapods, and green satin slippers with bunches of fresh lettuce for decorations instead of bows or buckles. All around her silken waist four leaf clovers are delicately sewn into the sash and she wears a little jacket trimmed with sparkling emeralds of a uniform size. The reader also learns in the plot that she is a northern Gillikin by birth. Scarecrow, then the ruler of Oz in the Wizard's stead, uses Jellia to act as an interpreter between him and the Gillikin Jack Pumpkinhead, who does not realize that all Ozites speak the same language, so Jellia "translates" Jack's words as insults as a prank. After General Jinjur and Mombi have joined forces and taken over the Emerald City, Jellia is compelled to retain her job. She is brought before Mombi who uses her dark magic to exchange forms with Jellia in order to trick Glinda the Good Witch into thinking Mombi has surrendered herself, but Glinda is not fooled by this trick and undoes Mombi's curse. Jellia refuses to speak about what happened until Glinda promises to protect her from harm.

She is seen briefly in the third Oz book Ozma of Oz (1907), and shown to have an affectionate relationship with the Scarecrow (despite him no longer being the ruler of the Emerald City).

In the fourth Oz book Dorothy and the Wizard in Oz (1908), she and the Omby Amby are among the first to greet the Wizard upon his second return to Oz, and he recognizes them as the "green girl" and the "Soldier with the Green Whiskers", as he does not know them by their real names.

In the fifth Oz book The Road to Oz (1909), Jellia Jamb is among the guests at the royal birthday party held in honor of Oz's official ruler, Princess Ozma.

=== In other books ===
Jellia Jamb has supporting parts in some of the sequel books written by Baum's successors. She is prominent in Ozoplaning with the Wizard of Oz (1939), Ruth Plumly Thompson's nineteenth Oz book.

== Portrayals ==
Jellia has not proven a major figure in Oz adaptations. Glenna Vaughn is the first person credited with the role in the Meglin Kiddies film The Land of Oz (1932). Some fans like to think that the Wash and Brush-Up girl portrayed by Lois January in The Wizard of Oz (1939) is Jellia.

In The Shirley Temple Show's 1960 adaptation of The Land of Oz, she appears for the famous translation scene, and is depicted as a beautiful, yet comical young woman.

She appears in The Wonderful Land of Oz (1969) to do the translation scene, but her role in the climax is eliminated, and the actor, a day player, went unbilled.

In the 1988 Polish cutout cartoon series W krainie czarnoksiężnika Oza (In the Land of the Wizard of Oz), which adapts The Wonderful Wizard of Oz and The Marvelous Land of Oz, Jellia is merged with character of Jinjur. She is young woman with blue hair and wearing oriental attire. She served as one of servant of Wizard, but after the Scarecrow became ruler of Emerald City, she change name to Jinjur and became self-appointed general leading an all-woman force "Army of Revolt". She voiced by Ewa Ziętek.

In the anime feature film The Wizard of Oz (1982), she is an unnamed young, tawny-haired girl voiced by Elizabeth Hanna, who is unbilled for that role, and dressed like a soldier instead of a maid.

The Wonderful Wizard of Oz anime (1986) portrayed her as a woman of middle age.

She is also the titular character in Dave Hardenbrook's Jellia Jamb: Maid Of Oz, which is a sequel to The Unknown Witches of Oz.
