= The Scalawagons of Oz =

1941 book by John R. Neill

- Cover of The Scalawagons of Oz.
- Author: John R. Neill
- Illustrator: John R. Neill
- Language: English
- Series: The Oz books
- Genre: Children's novel Fantasy
- Publisher: Reilly & Lee
- Publication date: 1941
- Publication place: United States
- Media type: Print (Hardcover)
- Pages: 309 pp.
- Preceded by: The Wonder City of Oz
- Followed by: Lucky Bucky in Oz

The Scalawagons of Oz (1941) is the thirty-fifth book in the Oz series created by L. Frank Baum and continued by his successors; it is the second volume in the series both written and illustrated by John R. Neill. The novel was followed by Lucky Bucky in Oz (1942).

== Plot ==
In Scalawagons, Neill exploits two characters he introduced in his previous novel, The Wonder City of Oz, Number Nine and Jenny Jump. Jenny is the book's protagonist, though the story begins with Number Nine, who is now an assistant to the Wizard of Oz. The Wizard tends to disappear suddenly, as he pursues various projects. His latest project is the creation of a new form of transportation for the Land of Oz. In a red-domed facility atop Carrot Mountain in the Quadling Country, the Wizard has established a factory to build scalawagons, intelligent cars that can also fly. They spread their running boards like wings. In his illustrations, Neill makes them resemble the "kiddie cars" of amusement-park rides; their heads are in turrets on their roofs.

The Wizard makes Tik-Tok the superintendent of the scalawagon factory. The scalawagons are conscious, but not very smart; Tik-Tok pounds sense into them with a rubber mallet. His new duties wear on the mechanical man, however, and he runs down sooner than expected. A blue-green buckwheat cake named Bell-snickle finds the factory; bent on mischief, the monster knocks the stationary Tik-Tok out a window. Bell-snickle ignores Tik-Tok's warning signs, and fuels the scalawagons with "flabber-gas" (apparently a pun on the word "flabbergast"); they quickly fly away. In the disorder, Bell-snickle is soaked in the fluid; blown up like a balloon, he/she/it sails away into the sky — and disappears from the plot for ten chapters. "Flabber-gas" is a liquid — "gas" as in gasoline — but has the effect of lighter-than air gasses like hydrogen and helium.

The palace of Glinda is located not far away; from her Great Book of Records Glinda learns of the scalawagons' existence and their escape. A party sets out to investigate, consisting of Jenny Jump, The Scarecrow, the Tin Woodman, and the Sawhorse. The four are quickly involved in chaotic adventures, complicated by the Sawhorse's tendency to race off uncontrolled, and involving a menagerie of beings that includes "Lollies" and their "Pops," water spirits and kelpies, talking animals and a grumpy grandfather clock. Jenny Jump uses her fairy powers to take to the air and meets a group of fairy bell-ringers called the Nota-bells. When Number Nine joins Jenny, they find and wind up Tik-Tok, and eventually locate the scalawagons flying over the Deadly Desert and herd them back to Oz.

Bell-snickle returns to cause more trouble. It comes to dominate a stand of walking talking trees, and drives them toward the Emerald City in a vain attempt at conquest. At the gate of the city, the Tin Woodman terrifies the trees with his axe, and the threat is quickly disposed of. Bell-snickle is captured, and is cowed into agreeing to a new way of life: Jenny runs the monster through the turnstile of her style shop until it is reduced to a rubber stamp. Ozma also uses the converted monster as a stopper, to stop trends she doesn't approve. The Nota-bells are given quarters in a high tower of Ozma's palace, where they supply pleasant music to the city below. The story ends with a great party and dance.

== Bell-snickle analysis ==
The antagonist of Neill's plot is a mysterious monstrosity called Bell-snickle. It first appears as "a large bluish-green object, flat as a buckwheat cake, and rolling along on its edge like a cartwheel." The creature does have arms and legs, as well as facial features; it wears bells on its ears, explaining at least one portion of its name. (The thing has no apparent relation to the Belsnickel of Christmas lore, except their common nomenclature.)

Neill gives no account of Bell-snickle's origin and no explanation of its nature or abilities. The creature prides itself on being a "mystery," and attacks anything that shares that designation. It has the egotism and petulance of a spoiled child.

== Puns ==
Baum introduced pun-dependent humor into the Oz books from the start of the series; Neill carried punning farther than any other Oz writer. In the course of her adventures, Jenny Jump lands in a field of conscious and talkative potatoes; they are ruled by a spud named Dick — he is their "Dick Tater." Late in the book, the Scarecrow and Tin Woodman enjoy "a game of squash" — which they play "with ripe bananas and brickbats."

== Reception ==
In A Brief Guide to Oz, Paul Simpson writes: "Even less well regarded than Neill's effort from the previous year, perhaps unsurprisingly, copies of The Scalawagons are very hard to find!"

The Oz books
Previous book: The Wonder City of Oz	The Scalawagons of Oz; 1941	Next book: Lucky Bucky in Oz
