= The Royal Book of Oz =

Book by Ruth Plumly Thompson

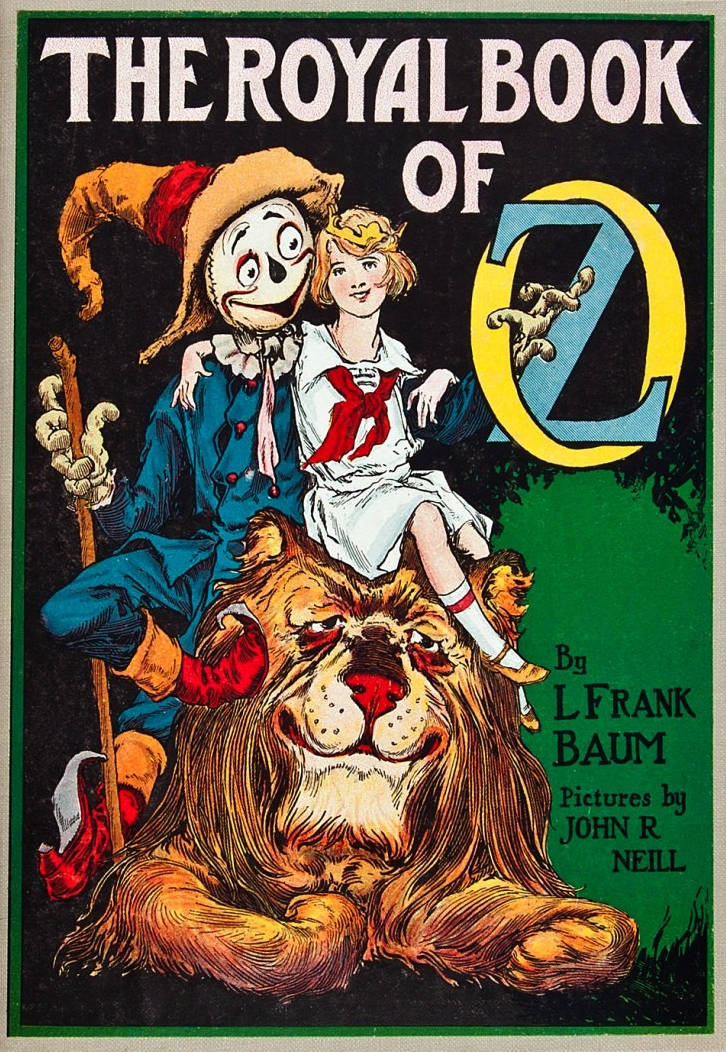
- Cover of The Royal Book of Oz
- Author: Ruth Plumly Thompson (some editions list L. Frank Baum as author)
- Illustrator: John R. Neill
- Language: English
- Series: The Oz books
- Genre: Children's novel
- Publisher: Reilly & Lee
- Publication date: May 1, 1921
- Publication place: United States
- Media type: Print (hardcover)
- Pages: 303
- Preceded by: Glinda of Oz
- Followed by: Kabumpo in Oz

The Royal Book of Oz (1921) is the fifteenth book in the Oz series, and the first to be written after L. Frank Baum's death. Although Baum was credited as the author, it was written entirely by Ruth Plumly Thompson. It was followed by Kabumpo in Oz (1922).

== Plot summary ==
The Scarecrow is upset when Professor Woggle-Bug tells him that he has no family, so he goes back to the corn-field where Dorothy Gale found him to trace his "roots." When he fails to return, Dorothy and the Cowardly Lion set out to search for him. They meet an elderly knight, Sir Hokus of Pokes. They also meet the Doubtful Dromedary and the Comfortable Camel. Together, they have several curious adventures while searching for the Scarecrow.

The Scarecrow discovers that, in a previous incarnation, he was human. More specifically, he was Chang Wang Woe, Emperor of the Silver Islands, a kingdom located deep underground beneath the Munchkin region of Oz, inhabited by people who resemble Chinese people. When Dorothy first discovered the Scarecrow (in The Wonderful Wizard of Oz) he was hanging from a beanpole in a cornfield; it now develops that this pole descends deep underground to the Silver Islands. The Emperor had been transformed into a crocus by an enemy magician; this magical crocus had sprouted and grown into the beanpole all the way up to the surface of the earth. When the farmer placed his scarecrow on the beanpole, the spirit of the transformed Emperor entered the Scarecrow's body, causing him to come to life.

The Scarecrow digs at the base of the beanpole and slides down the beanpole to the Silver Islands. The islanders hail him as the Emperor, returned to save his people. After spending some time in his former kingdom ruling the quarrelsome Silver Islanders, the Scarecrow decides to return to Oz and continue his carefree existence there. The islanders, however, are reluctant to let him go, and plot to change him back into his human form, an 85-year-old man. Dorothy and her party reach the Silver Islands, rescue the Scarecrow from the islanders, and accompany him back to the Emerald City. Sir Hokus, the Comfortable Camel, and the Doubtful Dromedary become residents of the Emerald City.

== Authorship ==
The original introduction claimed that the book was based on notes by Baum, but this claim has been contested and disproven. The notes, titled "An Oz Book", are known from four typewritten pages found at his publisher's, but their authenticity as Baum's work has been disputed. Even if genuine, they are tied to John Dough and the Cherub and bear no resemblance to Thompson's book.

In 1964, Thompson, in a letter, claimed that this note idea was fabricated by the publishers "to bridge the gap between Baum's books and" hers. Thompson also asserted that she did not utilize any notes of Baum's. After submission of the manuscript, the publisher requested the story be completely rewritten. However, Thompson threatened to publish the book elsewhere without the Oz elements, and the publisher decided to publish the book as written.

Beginning in the 1980s, some editions have correctly credited Thompson, although the cover of the 2001 edition by Dover Publications credits only Baum.

== Later Oz stories ==
Sir Hokus and the Comfortable Camel return as principal characters in The Yellow Knight of Oz.

The Oz books
Previous book: Glinda of Oz	The Royal Book of Oz; 1921	Next book: Kabumpo in Oz
