= Journey Back to Oz =

1972 animated film by Hal Sutherland

- Theatrical release poster
- Directed by: Hal Sutherland
- Written by: Fred Ladd; Norm Prescott; Bernard Evslin
- Based on: The Marvelous Land of Oz: Being an Account of the Further Adventures of the Scarecrow and the Tin Woodman by L. Frank Baum
- Produced by: Preston Blair; Fred Ladd; Norm Prescott; Lou Scheimer
- Starring: Milton Berle; Herschel Bernardi; Paul Ford; Margaret Hamilton; Jack E. Leonard; Paul Lynde; Ethel Merman; Liza Minnelli; Mickey Rooney; Risë Stevens; Danny Thomas; Mel Blanc; Dallas McKennon; Larry Storch
- Edited by: Joseph Simon
- Music by: Walter Scharf
- Production company: Filmation
- Distributed by: Seymour Borde
- Release date: December 14, 1972
- Running time: 88 minutes
- Country: United States
- Language: English

Journey Back to Oz is a 1972 American animated fantasy film produced by Filmation. Although L. Frank Baum received no screen credit, the film is loosely based on his second novel The Marvelous Land of Oz (1904). While a commercial flop in theaters, the film received a better reception on television, premiering December 5, 1976 on ABC.

For television broadcast, Filmation produced live-action interstitial segments with a celebrity playing the Wizard, flying in his balloon with two Munchkins. Filmation contracted with Bill Cosby for two airings of the live-action segments, while Milton Berle was cast for the live-action interstitials used in subsequent syndication.

== Plot ==
After a cyclone in Kansas causes a loose gate to knock Dorothy unconscious, she awakes in the Land of Oz with Toto, and encounters a talking Signpost (voiced by Jack E. Leonard), whose three signs point in different directions, all marked "Emerald City". They later meet Pumpkinhead (voiced by Paul Lynde), the unwilling servant of antagonist Mombi – cousin of the deceased Wicked Witches of the East and West. Toto chases a cat to a small cottage where Dorothy is captured by Mombi's pet crow (voiced by Mel Blanc) and Mombi (voiced by Ethel Merman) herself. Pumpkinhead sneaks into the house in Mombi's absence, and discovers her creation of green elephants, to use as her army to conquer the Emerald City. Pumpkinhead frees Dorothy, and they flee. After finding Dorothy gone, Mombi threatens that their warning the Scarecrow will not help when her green elephants "come crashing through the gate".

Dorothy and Pumpkinhead acquire Woodenhead Stallion III (voiced by Herschel Bernardi), a former merry-go-round horse (a combination of the Sawhorse from The Marvelous Land of Oz and the title character of the last Oz book of all, Merry Go Round in Oz), who takes them to the Emerald City, where Dorothy warns the Scarecrow (voiced by Mickey Rooney) about Mombi's green elephants. Mombi arrives moments later, and Toto and the Scarecrow are captured. Dorothy, Pumpkinhead, and Woodenhead flee to Tinland to convince the Tin Man (voiced by Danny Thomas, who sang, and Larry Storch, who spoke in the final film as Thomas' speaking parts went missing when production resumed in 1970) to help them. He declines upon learning of the green elephants and suggests that they ask the Cowardly Lion (voiced by Milton Berle), who promises to slay the elephants, but he also declines when informed of the elephants being made with magic and suggests consulting Glinda the Good Witch (voiced by Rise Stevens), who appears to them with a "Glinda Bird" that uses its Tattle Tail to show what is occurring at the palace. She also admits she cannot help Dorothy fight Mombi, telling Dorothy that self-faith is the only thing she needs. As Dorothy understands this, Glinda then gives her a little silver box of "countermagic", to open only in the Emerald City, and only in a dire emergency.

Mombi, having seen their progress in her crystal ball, brings the nearby trees to life; whereupon Glinda sends a golden hatchet to Pumpkinhead. One of the trees snatches it from him, but changes its fellows and itself into gold and turns them from bad to good. Woodenhead carries Dorothy and Pumpkinhead back to the Emerald City, where Mombi's elephants surprise them. When Dorothy opens Glinda's box, mice emerge, scaring the elephants. Mombi brews a potion to shrink Toto to mouse-size so she can feed him to her cat; but when startled, miniaturizes her crow and cat instead. Thereafter Mombi disguises herself as a rose with poisonous thorns, but Toto goads the elephants into fatally trampling over her, causing them to disappear, to which the Scarecrow explains that Mombi's death has caused all her magic to die with her. Unfortunately, Pumpkinhead, another product of Mombi, also dies; however, he is revived by one of Dorothy's tears.

The Scarecrow makes Woodenhead the head of the Oz cavalry and knights Pumpkinhead; and Dorothy and Toto leave Oz by another cyclone (created by Pumpkinhead and Glinda), promising to return.

== Cast ==
- Liza Minnelli as Dorothy Gale
- Mickey Rooney as the Scarecrow
- Danny Thomas as the Tin Woodman (singing voice)
- Milton Berle as the Cowardly Lion
- Paul Lynde as Jack Pumpkinhead
- Herschel Bernardi as Charelsworth Pinto "Woodenhead" Stallion III
- Ethel Merman as Mombi, the Wicked Witch
- Risë Stevens as Glinda the Good Witch
- Margaret Hamilton as Aunt Em
- Paul Ford as Uncle Henry
- Jack E. Leonard as the Signpost
- Larry Storch as the Tin Woodman (speaking voice) and Amos, Aunt Em and Uncle Henry's farmworker
- Dallas McKennon as Omby Amby
- Mel Blanc as Mombi's crow
- Lou Scheimer as Tin Woodman's guard (uncredited)

== Credits ==
- Animators: Bob Bransford, Bob Carlson, Jim Davis, Otto Feuer, Ed Friedman, Fred Grable, Laverne Harding, Lou Kachivas, Les Kaluza, Anatole Kirsanoff, George Kreisl, Paul Krukowski, Michael Lah, Bill Nunes, Jack Ozark, Manny Perez, Virgil Raddatz, Bill Reed, George Rowley, Ed Solomon, Ralph Somerville, Reuben Timmins, Jack Zander, Lou Zukor

== Production ==
Development began in 1962; however, Filmation ran out of money and the unfinished film was shelved for nearly eight years. It was only after the Filmation studio profited on their numerous television series that it was finally able to complete the project, copyrighted 1971, released in 1972 in the United Kingdom and 1974 in the United States.

The film features Liza Minnelli as the voice of Dorothy (played in the 1939 film by her mother Judy Garland, and in what would have been her first major role had the film been released as originally intended, as it released after Cabaret). Other voices were supplied by Peter Lawford, Milton Berle, Ethel Merman, Paul Lynde, Herschel Bernardi, Paul Ford, Danny Thomas, Margaret Hamilton (also from the 1939 film, but now playing Aunt Em instead of the Wicked Witch of the West), and Metropolitan Opera mezzo-soprano Risë Stevens as Glinda the Good Witch. Lawford and Thomas recorded their lines as the Scarecrow and the Tin Woodman, respectively, but were replaced with Mickey Rooney (a former co-star and lifelong friend of Garland's) and Larry Storch, though Thomas' vocals for the song "H-E-A-R-T" were kept in.

For the film's American release, Filmation partnered producer Seymour Borde and distributed through a process called four wall distribution, whereupon the studio rented venues to show it and kept all of the box office revenue. Outside the United States and Canada, Warner Bros. distributed the film.

=== Music ===
The film contains twelve original songs by Sammy Cahn and Jimmy Van Heusen. The arrangements and some of the film's score was by Walter Scharf. The original songs (which were featured on a ℗1980 soundtrack album released in conjunction with the film's television airings on the SFM Holiday Network) include the following:

No.	Title	Performer(s)	Length
1.	"A Faraway Land"	Liza Minnelli
2.	"Signpost Song"	Jack E. Leonard
3.	"Keep a Happy Thought"	Liza Minnelli
4.	"The Horse on the Carousel"	Herschel Bernardi
5.	"B-R-A-N-E"	Mickey Rooney
6.	"An Elephant Never Forgets"	Ethel Merman
7.	"H-E-A-R-T"	Danny Thomas
8.	"N-E-R-V-E"	Milton Berle
9.	"You Have Only You"	Risë Stevens
10.	"If You're Gonna Be a Witch - Be a Witch"	Ethel Merman
11.	"Return to the Land of Oz March"	Liza Minnelli
12.	"That Feeling for Home"	Liza Minnelli

A majority of the film contains library music from other sources. The piece of music heard in the opening titles is The Awakening from Johnny Pearson, recorded in 1967 (three years after production on this film began). It is otherwise used as theme for ITN's News at Ten.

== Reception ==
On the review aggregator website Rotten Tomatoes, 30% of 20 critics' reviews are positive. The website's consensus reads: "Journey Back to Oz amounts to nothing more than a crude, awkwardly animated, charm-starved misfire."

== Television broadcast ==
While Journey Back to Oz was a financial failure in its original theatrical release, the film eventually found an audience through repeated television broadcast. When Filmation sold the television rights to ABC in 1976, Bill Cosby was in the midst of success with both the Filmation series Fat Albert and the Cosby Kids, and starring in the new Cos variety series for ABC. Filmation decided to expand and reformat the film to a Christmas television special. The film's running time was extended to include new live-action connecting segments with Cosby as the Wizard, a character otherwise not seen in the original theatrical release. The live-action subplot involved two lost Munchkins, Sprig and Twig, trying to get home to spend Christmas with Dorothy, while helping to move the plot along. This extended TV version would later air in syndication via SFM Holiday Network. The last known broadcast of this Christmas version was in 1984. SFM produced another television version minus the holiday tie-in for broadcast during the rest of the year. New live-action sequences for this version were filmed featuring cast member Milton Berle, replacing the Bill Cosby segments.

== Home media ==
A special edition DVD was released on October 24, 2006. This DVD features a audio commentary, interviews with creators Lou Scheimer, Hal Sutherland and Fred Ladd, behind the scenes photo gallery, image galleries featuring poster art and animation cels, a sing-a-long feature, most of the Bill Cosby interstitials used in the TV version (presented separately from the original theatrical version contained on the disc and sourced from an incomplete PAL transfer of the TV version, as a complete version of the latter cut was unavailable), the first draft script and storyboards, and a photo gallery (mostly containing behind-the-scenes photos of the Cosby and Berle live-action interstitials used in syndicated broadcasts).

== See also ==
- List of American films of 1972
- List of films about witchcraft
