= Lucky Bucky in Oz =

1942 book by John R. Neill

- Cover of Lucky Bucky in Oz.
- Author: John R. Neill
- Illustrator: John R. Neill
- Language: English
- Series: The Oz books
- Genre: Children's novel Fantasy
- Publisher: Reilly & Lee
- Publication date: 1942
- Publication place: United States
- Media type: Print (Hardcover)
- Pages: 309 pp.
- Preceded by: The Scalawagons of Oz
- Followed by: The Magical Mimics in Oz

Lucky Bucky in Oz (1942) is the thirty-sixth book in the Oz series created by L. Frank Baum and his successors, and the third and last written and illustrated solely by John R. Neill. (He wrote a fourth, The Runaway in Oz, but died before illustrating it.) The book was followed by The Magical Mimics in Oz (1946).

Bucky Jones is aboard a tugboat in New York Harbor when the boiler blows up. He is soon blown into the Nonestic Ocean where he meets Davy Jones, a wooden whale. The pair take an undersea route to the Emerald City, and have many adventures along the way.

The Oz books
Previous book: The Scalawagons of Oz	Lucky Bucky in Oz; 1942	Next book: The Magical Mimics in Oz
