= Good Witch of the North (Baum) =

Character from The Wonderful Wizard of Oz

- Oz character
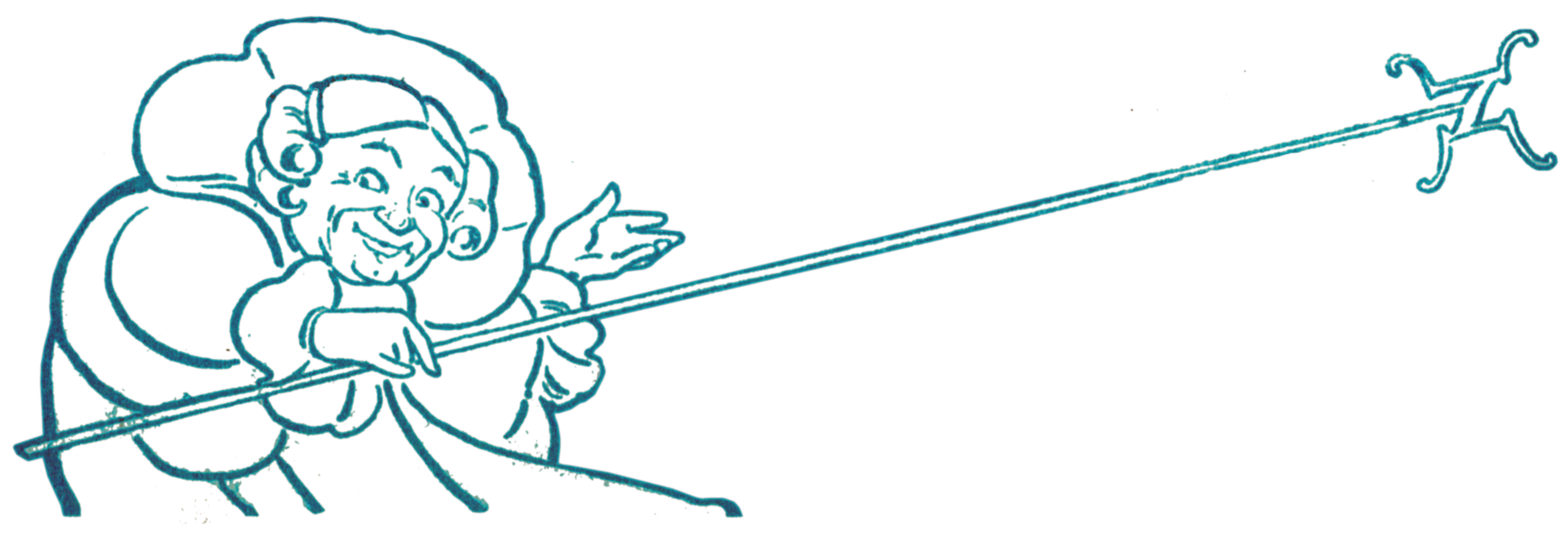
- The Witch of the North (without her hat) as illustrated by W. W. Denslow (1900)
- First appearance: The Wonderful Wizard of Oz (1900)
- Created by: L. Frank Baum
- Portrayed by: Karen Holness (Once Upon a Time)

In-universe information
- Aliases: Locusta (1902) (Stage play); Tattypoo / Queen Orin (1928) (The Giant Horse of Oz); Villina (1939) (The Wizard of the Emerald City); Glinda the Witch of the North (1939) (The Wizard of Oz); Addaperle (1974) (The Wiz); Miss One (1978) (The Wiz film adaptation); Hellwedo (1982) (Barnstormer in Oz by Philip Jose Farmer); Galinda Upland (1995) (Wicked); Locasta (2000) (The Unknown Witches of Oz); Splenda the Sweet But Non-Fattening Fairy (2007) (The Wonderful Wizard of Ha's); Witch of the North (2014) (Once Upon a Time); Gert (2014) (Dorothy Must Die); Addaperle the Feel Good Girl (2015) (The Wiz Live!); Glinda the Good (2015 - 2018) (Lost in Oz); Glinda / Mistress North (2017) (Emerald City)
- Species: Human (witch)
- Gender: Female
- Title: The Good Witch of the North
- Occupation: Ruler of the Gillikin Country
- Nationality: Ozian of Gillikin descent

The Good Witch of the North, sometimes named Locusta or Tattypoo, is a fictional character in the Land of Oz, created by American author L. Frank Baum. She is the elderly and mild-mannered Ruler of the Gillikin Country. Her only significant appearance in Baum's work is in Chapter 2 of The Wonderful Wizard of Oz (1900), in which she introduces Dorothy Gale to Oz and sends her to meet the Wizard, after placing a protective kiss on her forehead. She makes a brief cameo appearance at Princess Ozma's birthday party in The Road to Oz (1909), but is otherwise only mentioned elsewhere in the series.

L. Frank Baum presented her as a kind and gentle character who opposed the oppression and subjugation of people. She became the Ruler of the Gillikin Country in the North after freeing the Gillikins from the clutches of Mombi, the erstwhile Wicked Witch of the North. However, the character's kindness and magnanimity of spirit was not confined to her own domain, and she was loved not only by her own subjects but also by other people in Oz, such as the Munchkins. Although she wasn't as powerful as the Wicked Witch of the East and was hence unable to depose her the way she deposed Mombi, the Good Witch of the North was nonetheless exceedingly sensitive to the plight of the enslaved Munchkins, who regarded her as their friend. She also appears as a highly altered player in Ruth Plumly Thompson's The Giant Horse of Oz (1928), in which she is called Tattypoo.

Her role was significantly expanded in the 1902 musical extravaganza, in which L. Frank Baum named her Locusta. The character was more famously conflated with that of Glinda, the Good Witch of the South, for the 1939 film version, making Glinda the Good Witch of the North who fulfills both of their roles in Dorothy's adventure.

== Literature ==
=== The classic books ===
In the original novel The Wonderful Wizard of Oz, the Good Witch of the North is summoned to the Munchkin Country when Dorothy Gale's falling house kills the Wicked Witch of the East. She arrives at the site of the Wicked Witch's death with three Munchkins and is the only one brave enough to speak to Dorothy, who, having killed the Witch of the East, is believed to be a powerful sorceress. She welcomes Dorothy to the Land of the Munchkins, points out the body of the dead witch and then introduces herself as the Witch of the North. Having been told that all witches are evil, Dorothy is initially frightened of her, but she assures Dorothy that she is a good witch who is much loved by her people. She also mentions that she is not as powerful as the Witch of the East had been, or she would have liberated the Munchkins from slavery herself. Using a magic slate formed from her hat, she advises Dorothy to travel to the Emerald City to seek the aid of the powerful Wizard of Oz in returning to Kansas. She kisses Dorothy on the forehead, a magical act that serves to protect Dorothy on the journey, because "no one will dare injure a person who has been kissed by the Witch of the North". This statement is proven to be correct later in the book, when the sight of the shining mark left by the kiss prevents Dorothy from being harmed by the Winged monkeys or the Wicked Witch of the West. The sight of this mark is also one of the factors which convinces the Wizard to admit Dorothy to his presence.

At the beginning of The Marvelous Land of Oz, it is revealed that the Good Witch of the North had banned the practice of magic by any other witch in Gillikin Country (thereby minimizing potential future threats). The Gillikin Country had once been under the power of Mombi, but she was overpowered and routed by the Good Witch of the North, as revealed in Dorothy and the Wizard in Oz. Thus, the Wicked Witch of the North was forced to be no more than a lowly wizardess, under the Good Witch of the North's rule.

In Baum's fifth Oz book, The Road to Oz, the Witch of the North is one of the many guests who attend Ozma's birthday party. She amuses the attendees by transforming ten stones into ten birds, the ten birds into ten lambs, and the ten lambs into ten little girls, who gave a pretty dance and were then transformed back into ten stones once again.

The name of the Good Witch of the North in Baum's own stage version of The Wizard of Oz is Locusta.

== The 1939 movie ==
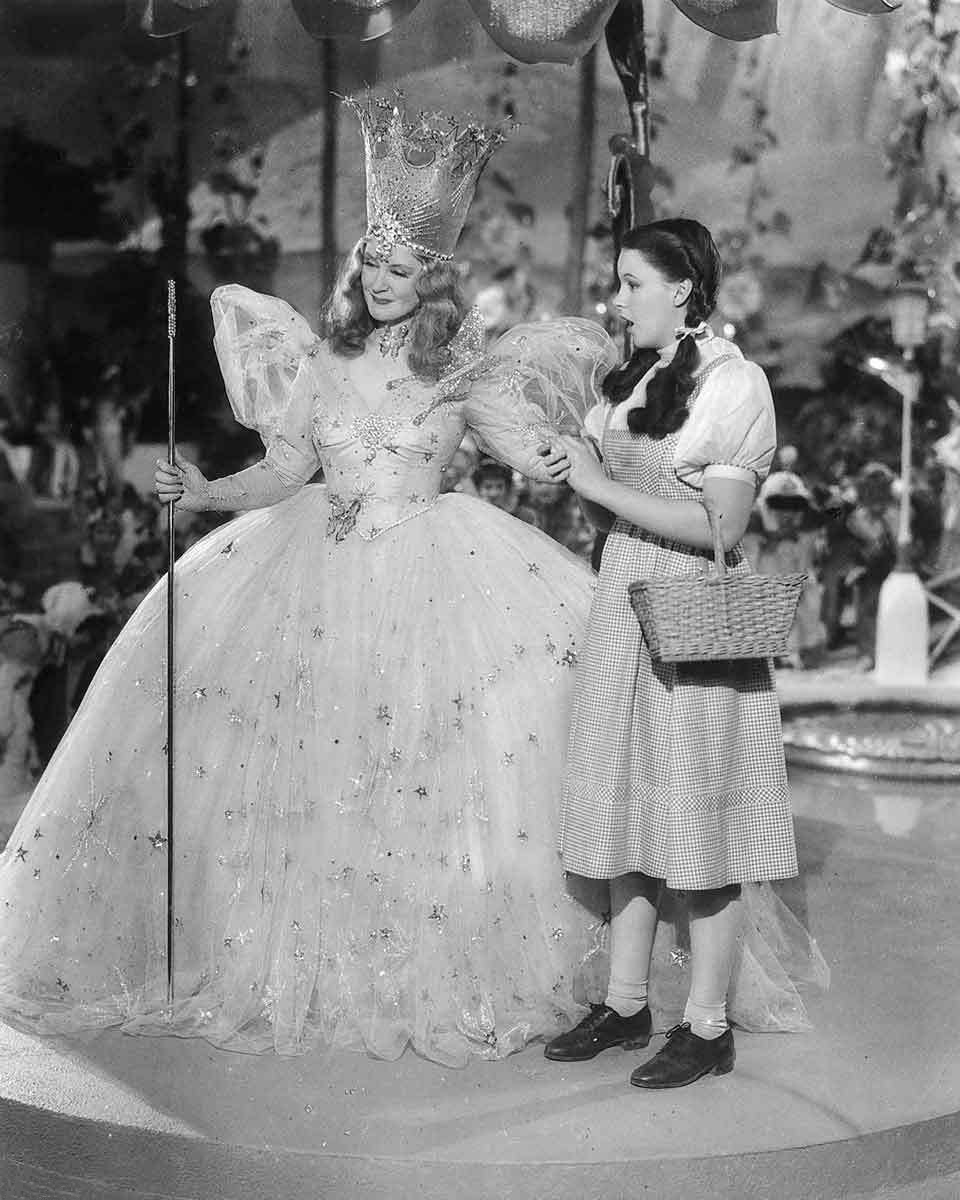
Dorothy Gale (Judy Garland, right) with Glinda, the Good Witch of the North (Billie Burke) in 1939 film The Wizard of Oz

In the classic 1939 MGM movie The Wizard of Oz, the Good Witch of the North is called Glinda, which is the name of the Good Witch of the South in the Oz novels. In the movie, Glinda the Good Witch of the North, portrayed by Billie Burke, is only slightly matronly and quite beautiful, and in addition to meeting Dorothy on her arrival in Oz, she also supervises her progress on her journey to the Wizard and helps her find her way back to Kansas at the end of the story. She wears a coral pink ball gown with a matching crown and carries a long magic wand with a glittering star on the tip. Although the existence of a "Good Witch of the South" is implied by the cardinal point names of Glinda and the other two witches, the film makes no direct reference to such a character.

== Later works ==
In The Giant Horse of Oz, Ruth Plumly Thompson names the Good Witch of the North "Tattypoo"; as the story unfolds, Tattypoo turns out to be the bewitched form of a beautiful Munchkin queen named Orin. Orin had originally been kidnapped by the former Wicked Witch of the North, Mombi, who was in love with her husband, King Cheeriobed of the Ozure Isles. In order to remove her rival, Mombi kidnapped Orin soon after the birth of her son, Prince Philador. She then transformed Orin into an old witch who had no recollection of her former life as Queen of the Ozure Isles. Eventually, as Tattypoo, Orin was able to displace Mombi as the ruler of the Gillikins. After being restored to her real self, twenty five years later, Orin loses the magical powers she acquired as the Good Witch of the North. She returns to her husband and son and resumes her life as Queen of the Ozure Isles, no longer wishing to rule the Gillikin Country. At the end of the book, Princess Ozma proclaims Jo King and Queen Hyacinth from a Gillikin province named Up Town as the new rulers of the Gillikins.

Glinda, along with her other good witch counterpart, appear in a little-known 1995 version of The Wizard of Oz made for British television. After the defeat of the Wicked Witch of the West, she reveals to Dorothy (Denise Van Outen) that the Ruby Slippers ended up in the possession of the Wicked Witch of the East after falling off the feet of a previous visitor from over the rainbow (Zöe Salmon, in a cameo appearance) after she wished to go back to where she came from. She refuses to take possession of them, as she's afraid of being tempted by their power, so she summons the other good witch, who takes them after Dorothy wishes herself home.

In 2000, Dave Hardenbrook published The Unknown Witches of Oz, with Locasta, the Good Witch of the North, as the main protagonist. Dave Hardenbrook wished to reconcile L. Frank Baum's original version of the character with Ruth Plumly Thompson's version. In Hardenbrook's novel, Locasta and Queen Orin were "switched" by Mombi, the same way Mombi "switched" herself with the maid Jellia Jamb in L. Frank Baum's novel, The Marvelous Land of Oz. Locasta, the true Good Witch of the North, was lost in the Great Outside World, while the enchanted Queen Orin took her title under the name of Tattypoo. Hardenbrook's novel outlines Locasta's return to the Land of Oz.

In Alexander Melentyevich Volkov's Magic Land series, the Witch's name is Villina. When the Wicked Witch of the East tried (in that continuity) to exterminate the humanity by means of a magical hurricane, Villina changed the spell so that it only affected one house (which, as her magical book said, was always empty during storms), and dropped it upon the Wicked Witch. Her magical slate is changed into a tiny book which transforms into a giant tome when blown upon, and, in addition to the divination qualities, also functions as an encyclopedia. She appears in two books after the first one (although in one of them she appears off stage, and it is narrated to the main characters).

== Wicked ==
Both Gregory Maguire's 1995 revisionist novel Wicked: The Life and Times of the Wicked Witch of the West and the musical Wicked (based on the book), follow the model of the 1939 movie in giving the name "Glinda" to the character who grows up to become The Good Witch of the North.

== The Wiz ==
In William F. Brown and Charlie Smalls's Broadway hit, The Wiz, the Good Witch of the North is named "Addaperle". She is portrayed by Clarice Taylor. Amber Riley played the role in the 2015 television special. In the 1978 film version, her name is "Miss One" (played by Thelma Carpenter). Glinda, the Good Witch of the South, is a separate character in both stage and film versions.

== Animation ==
In the 1982 anime film, The Good Witch of the North is again the grandmotherly figure of the novel. In the American version, she is voiced by an unbilled Elizabeth Hanna, who also played the Wicked Witch of the West. While appearing very young, Glinda (Wendy Thatcher) refers to the Good Witch of the North as her sister.

The VeggieTales episode The Wonderful Wizard of Ha's from Big Idea Productions contains Madame Blueberry as "Splenda the Sweet But Non-Fattening Fairy" (brand name for a sugar substitute) replacing both of the two Good Witches.

In the Amazon Prime Video 2015 animated series, Lost in Oz, the Witch appears as Glinda the Good, the ruler of the Emerald City who disappeared years ago, due to unknown reasons.

== Television ==
The "Witch of the North", played by Karen Holness, makes an appearance in the third season of Once Upon a Time. She is initially a good witch, helping out Glinda as part of the Sisterhood of Witches. Later, after the Wicked Witch of the West takes over Emerald City, She is relocated back to the North, where she becomes the cruel "Wicked Witch of the North" and is responsible for turning Stanum into the Tin Man. However it is possible that said Witch is in fact Mombi, and the two are distinct characters.

In The Muppets' Wizard of Oz, Glinda and the Good Witch of the North are again distinct characters (and the Good Witch of the North has the name Tattypoo), although they are both played by Miss Piggy (as are the two Wicked Witches). Miss Piggy's other role was herself. Prior to Dorothy's return, she appears with Kermit and tries to get rid of Dorothy. After Dorothy's return, she returns for the Muppets' show. Unlike the original version, North gets an angry Dorothy snapping at her for making her go on a pointless journey; since the slippers were how Dorothy could go home the whole time.

== Novel ==
In the 2014 novel Dorothy Must Die, by Danielle Paige, former Good Witch of the North Gert is a member of the Order of the Wicked.
