= The Runaway in Oz =

Book by John R. Neill

- Author: John R. Neill
- Illustrator: Eric Shanower
- Cover artist: Eric Shanower
- Language: English
- Series: The Oz Books
- Genre: Fantasy
- Publisher: Books of Wonder
- Publication date: 1995
- Publication place: United States
- Media type: Print (Hardcover)
- Pages: 242
- ISBN: 978-0-929605-39-5
- OCLC: 34360375
- LC Class: PZ7.N4287 Ru 1995

The Runaway in Oz is an unofficial follow-up to the Oz series by long-time Oz illustrator John R. Neill, published posthumuously in 1995. It was originally written in 1943, and was meant to be the thirty-seventh novel entry in the Oz series, but Neill died before editing or illustrating the book. Oz publisher Reilly & Lee decided not to publish the book due to shortages caused by World War II. The text remained a possession of Neill's family.

In 1995, the book was published by Oz specialty house Books of Wonder illustrated by Eric Shanower. Shanower also edited and expanded Neill's text. Another version exists, printed privately, with different editing by Fred M. Meyer, longtime Secretary of The International Wizard of Oz Club.

== Synopsis ==
On the eve of an important ceremony in the Emerald City, Scraps the Patchwork Girl has been making more of a nuisance of herself than usual. After confrontations with Jellia Jamb and Jenny Jump, Scraps decides to run away on her spoolicle (a bicycle made of thread spools). She visits Jinjur's Munchkin Country farm; but Jinjur wants to put Scraps to work, so Scraps leaves quickly.

At Prof. Wogglebug's Royal Athletic College, Scraps falls in with a 12-year-old prodigy named Alexample. They marvel at the air castle the Professor has dreamed into existence for his coming vacation, as it hovers above the college. Through unfortunate clumsiness, Scraps knocks the mooring line loose and the air castle floats away, with Alexample hanging onto the tethering rope. Scraps flees from the pursuit of the irate Wogglebug.

Scraps meets a Repairman who magically fixes the damage and staining she's endured in her recent actions. The exasperated Scraps longs to run away from Oz entirely, but doesn't know how to cross the Deadly Desert. The Repairman informs her of a Weather Witch who lives on the highest mountain in Oz; she makes weather for the entire Earth from her windmill there. Scraps decides to get the Weather Witch to blow her across the Desert with wind, and sets out for the mountain.

On the way, Scraps meets Popla, "the one and only power plant...the most powerful plant in the world." (Popla looks like a large shrub, with the face of a beautiful young woman.) Popla longs for release from her bleak and stationary existence, and eagerly transfers herself into a flowerpot to join with Scraps; Popla's strength and resourcefulness prove to be important advantages in their coming adventures. Despite tempestuous winds, the two intrepid travelers reach the top of the mountain. Fanny the Weather Witch agrees to blast them across the Deadly Desert; but additional clumsiness gets them stuck on one of the windmill's blades, which hurls them high into the atmosphere.

Meanwhile, Prof. Wogglebug stomps toward the Emerald City to complain about Scraps to the Wizard. He encounters Jenny Jump and Jack Pumpkinhead, who have set out in search for the missing Scraps. The Wogglebug decides to join up with them, as the most direct approach to recovering his air castle. (The later chapters of the book alternate between the two plots: the runaway Scraps and her companions, and the searchers pursuing her.)

Scraps and Popla land on a friendly cloud, who takes them to a nearby star. The star is a kind of semi-mechanical conveyance, commanded by Captain Batt, who is built of wires and electric components. Predictably, Scraps gets into a fight with him; she punches him in his button nose, which proves to be his on-off button. With Captain Batt shut down, they meet the Twinkler, the star's maintenance man (he looks like Cap'n Bill). Popla tries piloting the star — and crashes into the missing air castle. They find Alexample there, and endure a few peaceful days in its palatial environs. They get to know the inhabitants of the upper air, who include sky fairies and air sprites, and cloud sheep herded by cloud-pushers and sky-sweepers. Scraps and company also repel an attack from sky pirates.

Things go badly for the searchers below; they are caught in a storm, in which Jack loses his pumpkin head. Jenny and the Professor have to lead or drag his headless stick-body along with them. They wander into an enchanted orchard, where they confront an army of rebellious quinces. By this time, the week of the Wogglebug's planned vacation has expired, and the air castle's time is up: it melts, cracks, dissolves, shatters, and otherwise falls apart around its occupants. They come tumbling down upon the enchanted orchard, and the search party, and the quince army. In a final confrontation, the quince soldiers commit mass suicide by shooting their sooty stems at Scraps. She is so blackened by the soot that she tries to hide from the world.

The others convince Scraps to return to the Emerald City, where she can be magically repaired. Scraps agrees, but she hides herself under a sheet as she walks through the city streets (like Ojo in The Patchwork Girl of Oz); she causes a panic when she is mistaken for a ghost. Yet Ozma has no trouble in restoring Scraps to normal (if that term applies) with her Magic Belt. Popla and Alexample are welcomed into the ever-growing circle of Ozma's followers.

The Oz books
Previous book: Merry Go Round in Oz	The Runaway in Oz; 1995	Next book: N/A
