= Mombi =

- Oz character
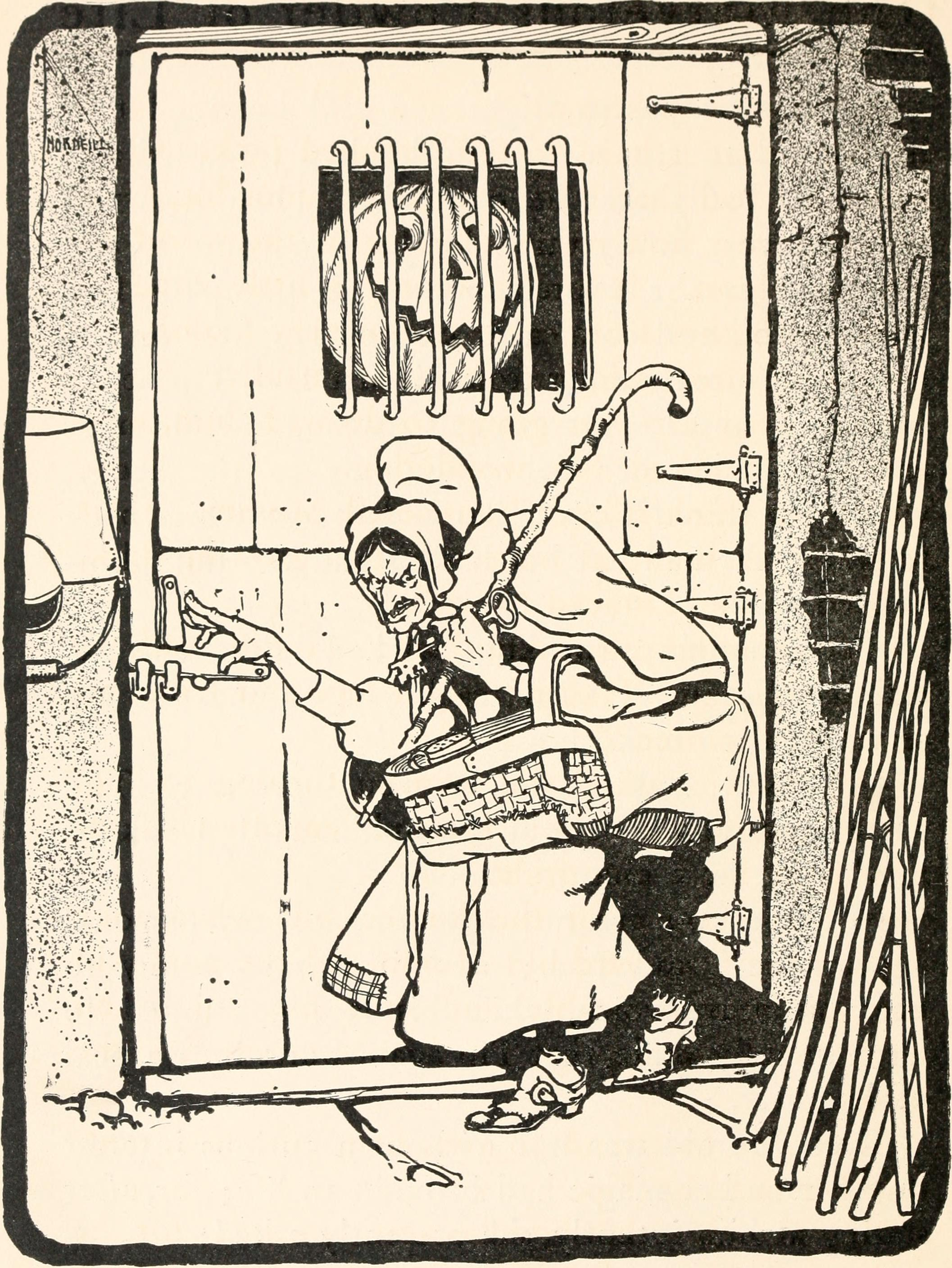
- Mombi--Wicked Witch of the North--Illustration by John R. Neill in The Marvelous Land of Oz
- First appearance: The Marvelous Land of Oz (1904)
- Created by: L. Frank Baum
- Portrayed by: Mai Wells (His Majesty, the Scarecrow of Oz); Agnes Moorehead (Shirley Temple's Storybook); Jean Marsh (Return to Oz); Fiona Shaw (Emerald City)
- Voiced by: Ethel Merman (Journey Back to Oz)

In-universe information
- Alias: The Wicked Witch of the North
- Species: Human (witch)
- Gender: Female
- Title: Ruler of the Gillikin Country (until the Good Witch of the North overthrew her)
- Children: Tip (foster-child)
- Nationality: Gillikin

Mombi is a fictional character in L. Frank Baum's classic children's series of Oz Books. She is the most significant antagonist in the second Oz book The Marvelous Land of Oz (1904), and is alluded to in other works. Mombi plays a very important role in the fictional history of Oz.

The character was originally presented as a lowly hag who had enchanted Princess Ozma in order to prevent her from ascending to the throne. Later in the series, Baum specified that she had once conquered and ruled the Gillikin Country, as the Wicked Witch of the North, only to be deposed by the Good Witch of the North.

Furthermore, Mombi had enslaved Ozma's father (King Pastoria) and grandfather, thereby removing the Royal Family of Oz, and enabling herself and the Wicked Witches of the East, West and South to conquer and divide the land between them.

After forcing her to disenchant Princess Ozma, Glinda the Good Witch of the South made Mombi drink a powerful draught that stripped the old witch of all her magic powers.

Mombi made no further appearances in Baum's books. In Ruth Plumly Thompson's The Lost King of Oz (1925), the witch raises havoc once again, and at the end of the book, in a rare act of Ozite capital punishment, Mombi is ruthlessly doused with water and melts away like the Wicked Witch of the West, so that nothing is left of her but her buckled shoes. Baum never said that all witches in Oz would die upon contact with water, but Ruth Plumly Thompson and several subsequent writers such as Rachel Payes had made that conclusion.

Mombi is apparently resurrected by Jack Pumpkinhead in Lucky Bucky in Oz (1942).

== The Marvelous Land of Oz ==
After arriving in Oz and proclaiming himself as the new dominant ruler, the Wizard made arrangements in three secret visits to an irrelevant witch known as simply Mombi. She lived in Oz's northern quadrant and practiced dark magic, casting curses and spells upon her enemies. Since the complex fall of Oz's deceased former King Pastoria, the Wizard took the King's baby daughter Princess Ozma and handed her over to the old witch in secrecy, thus leaving no heir to Oz's imperial throne and allowing the Wizard to become ruler of the land. Upon receiving her, Mombi kept the infant hidden away. To disguise her from ever being recognized by the people in Oz, Mombi cleverly transformed the princess into a young boy she nicknamed Tip. (transformations seemed to be Mombi's forte). Having been the jailor of Ozma's father and grandfather before, Mombi treated Tip as a slave, too, as he grew up.

Mombi's first match was the Good Witch of the North. After freeing the Gillikins from Mombi's clutches, the Good Witch forbade any other witch to live in her domain. Even after her defeat, Mombi was still a survivor. She made herself appear to be a lowly wizardess and settled down on a quiet farmland which included corn fields, a four-horned cow, and some pigs.

One day Mombi visited a Crooked Magician called Dr. Nikidik, and purchased the Powder of Life from him, which she used to bring Jack Pumpkinhead to life. Tip created Jack to scare her, so as punishment Mombi brewed a potion that would turn Tip into a marble statue. That night, Tip ran away and took Jack with him. When General Jinjur's Army of Revolt conquered the Emerald City, Jinjur feared that the deposed Scarecrow would return with the Tin Woodman to take back the throne of the kingdom. Jinjur asked Mombi for help and she agreed, hoping to recapture Tip, who had joined the Scarecrow.

After leaving the Gillikin Country to join forces with Jinjur, the new self-appointed Queen of Oz, Mombi was no longer under the jurisdiction of the Good Witch of the North. Scarecrow went to Glinda to ask for help in regaining the throne, but she refused and explained that Princess Ozma was the rightful ruler. She then set out to learn the fate of Pastoria's daughter.

Mombi tried to trick and escape from Glinda with a series of transformations ranging from the maid Jellia Jamb to a Rose and ultimately a Griffin, but the former Wicked Witch of the North was no match for the Good Witch of the South. Indeed, Glinda turned out to be an even tougher adversary than the Good Witch of the North. She captured Mombi and forced her to reveal the princess's location. Mombi restored Ozma to her proper form, and Glinda took away Mombi's magical powers. Just before being disenchanted, Tip promised to provide for Mombi in her old age, despite her fiendish actions. Baum wrote Ozma as a gentle, forgiving and compassionate individual, not a vengeful ruler.

== Later books ==
In Ruth Plumly Thompson's The Lost King of Oz, Dorothy suggests that Mombi be put out with a pail of water for her misdeeds, and Princess Ozma herself commands it. L. Frank Baum never suggested that water could destroy all witches, but Thompson certainly surmised as much. Moreover, L. Frank Baum's original Dorothy and Ozma would never have had anyone executed; Dorothy was unwilling to kill the Wicked Witch of the West even for the sake of seeing Aunt Em and Uncle Henry in Baum's The Wonderful Wizard of Oz, while Ozma was unwilling to destroy her enemies even when they were on the verge of conquering her entire land in Baum's The Emerald City of Oz. Above all, the events in Thompson's book directly contradict Baum's specification that Mombi would be provided for by Ozma herself in her old age.

"Mombi" appears in Lucky Bucky in Oz, when Jack Pumpkinhead's magic painting of the old witch comes off a wall and causes trouble.

March Laumer reversed her "death" from Ruth Plumly Thompson's book, regenerating and reforming the witch into a harmless character in his revisionist A Farewell to Oz. Similarly, in Oziana magazine, the official fiction-journal of the International Wizard of Oz Club, issue #38, the story "Executive Decisions," by David Tai, reconciles the account in The Lost King of Oz with the Ozma that Baum described, demonstrating that, in fact, she did not have Mombi executed as everyone was led to believe.

Mombi and Tip make a cameo appearance in Gregory Maguire's second Oz novel, Son of a Witch (though only Tip is named). In Maguire's fourth Oz novel, Out of Oz, Mombi (spelled "Mombey") plays a more significant role. In this book, Mombey has become the ruler of Munchkinland, which is at war with the rest of "Loyal Oz"; the Munchkinland armies are under the command of General Jinjuria. Maguire presents Mombey as a powerful woman who changes her appearance every day, probably a reference to the film Return to Oz, in which Mombi is conflated with the head-swapping Evite Princess Langwidere. Tip tells Rain (granddaughter of Elphaba, the Wicked Witch of the West) that Mombey traveled across the sands and learned how to change the shape of her head and her body from "some second-rate duchess" in "one of the duchy principalities, I think it was Ev". As in The Marvelous Land of Oz, Mombi/Mombey has enchanted the Princess Ozma into the form of the boy Tip; however, in Maguire's Oz the enchantment lasts for nearly a century. Mombey kidnaps Liir (son of Elphaba and father of Rain) and transforms him into an elephant. Later, Mombey's forces attack the Emerald City with the aid of dragons. At a subsequent conference for terms of surrender, Mombey uses a spell called "To Call the Lost Forward" in order to return Liir to his proper form; the spell inadvertently also returns Tip to his true form (Ozma) and restores Rain's natural green skin. Although the circumstances of the spell are quite different from those in The Marvelous Land of Oz, details of it closely resemble Baum's description and the illustration of Mombi's spell by John R. Neill.

== Film and television ==
The Wicked Witch of the West is given the similar name, "Momba" in the 1910 silent film The Wonderful Wizard of Oz, but is based on that character, not Mombi. A witch named Mombi also appears in the 1914 film His Majesty, the Scarecrow of Oz. The character resembles W. W. Denslow's depiction of the Wicked Witch of the West (complete with eyepatch, pigtails and umbrella), and her role in the story is based on the Wicked Witch of the West in The Wonderful Wizard of Oz and inspired the witch Blinkie in the novel The Scarecrow of Oz.

Mombi appears in the 1969 feature film The Wonderful Land of Oz, played by Zisca, whose real name is Franzisca Baum (no relation to L. Frank Baum). She sings the eerie song, "The Powder of Life," proudly proclaiming herself as a witch and not minding at all that Tip has called her one. Her appearance is largely modeled on Margaret Hamilton's in The Wizard of Oz (1939), but with her hair more down, dark circles under her eyes, a paler appearance and a more strained gait. There is purple highlighting in her clothes, emphasizing her Gillikin origins, in keeping with Baum's books.

Mombi is the main antagonist of the 1972 animated film Journey Back to Oz, which is a sequel to Victor Fleming's The Wizard of Oz and is loosely based on The Marvelous Land of Oz. In the film, Mombi (voiced by Ethel Merman) is the cousin of the late Wicked Witches of the East and West who tries to overthrow the Scarecrow with magical green elephants. When her plans are thwarted by Dorothy, Glinda and "Pumpkinhead", she transforms herself into a rose, as in The Marvelous Land of Oz; however, in this adaptation, the rose is trampled by one of the elephants, and Mombi is killed. She sings two comical solos in the film, titled "An Elephant Never Forgets" and "If You're Gonna Be a Witch (Be a Witch!)", in Ethel Merman's trademark brash style.

In the 1985 movie Return to Oz, the character of Mombi (portrayed by Jean Marsh) was combined with head-exchanging Princess Langwidere from the third book in the series, Ozma of Oz and she is renamed Princess Mombi. Here, she is portrayed as a dark-haired, deranged and evil middle-aged sorceress. She is a coward at heart who grovels before the Nome King and begs for her life when he is displeased with her. She makes a deal with the Nome King for if she trapped Princess Ozma in her enchanted mirror, he would make her a princess and gives her thirty beautiful heads (two of them are portrayed by Sophie Ward and Fiona Victory) which she could switch depending on her mood. He also gives her the Emerald City after he took away the emeralds. Mombi also guards the Powder of Life. When Dorothy encounters "Princess Mombi" in her palace, Mombi develops a fondness for Dorothy's head and locks her in the tower, planning to remove her head and take it once the girl has reached adulthood. Dorothy however escapes and steals the Powder of Life from a case which also contains Mombi's true head. Unfortunately, she awakens the head, which screams Dorothy's name, thereby awakening the other heads in turn, which all begin screaming her name. Ultimately, all the screaming awakens Mombi's headless body, which relentlessly pursues Dorothy, although the girl manages to escape. Donning her true head, Mombi sends her sinister minions the Wheelers after Dorothy. At the climax of the film, the Nome King imprisons Mombi in a magical cage for failing him. Like in Baum's original book, Mombi is stripped of all her magical powers at the end of the story (except by Dorothy, rather than Glinda, in this film). Though Princess Ozma forgives an imprisoned Mombi, on Earth, her counterpart is Nurse Wilson, the head nurse at the mental clinic that is run by Dr. J.B. Worley. The two of them have been using the machines at the clinic to secretly give their patients brain damage. When a power outage occurred during a thunderstorm, Nurse Wilson chased after Dorothy and loses her. After Dorothy returned to Kansas, she sees that Nurse Wilson was arrested and locked up in a cage on a horse buggy while Dr. Worley was mentioned to have perished in the fire caused by the thunderstorm.

In the 1986 anime adaptation Ozu no Mahōtsukai, Mombi takes on a middle aged, heavier appearance. She has purple hair in this series, in keeping with her Gillikin roots. Mombi is an antagonist in the episodes "The Tricks of Old Mombi" and "Princess Ozma" from the Russian miniseries "The Wizard of Oz" 1999. In the 1988 Polish cutout cartoon series W krainie czarnoksiężnika Oza, which adapts The Wonderful Wizard of Oz and The Marvelous Land of Oz, Mombi (voiced by Alina Bukowska) appeared under the name "Wicked Witch of the West" (the actual Witch is merged with Wicked Witch of the East into one character called "Wicked Witch of the East"). She is depicted as a skinny ginger-haired hag in the brown cloak similar to the Witch from Snow White and the Seven Dwarfs. She also has a disguise of a nice chubby granny, in front of which she presents herself to Jinjur.

Mombi is an antagonist in the episodes "The Tricks of Old Mombi" and "Princess Ozma" from the Russian miniseries "Adventures in the Emerald City" 1999.

She is referenced briefly but does not appear in Once Upon a Time, as simply "The Wicked Witch of the North" who turned the Nick Chopper character called Stanum into the Tin Man instead of the Wicked Witch of the East.

In the TV series Emerald City, Mombi is portrayed by Fiona Shaw, a witch posing as an apothecary, living in a town with no name, she kept Tip captive in her house, forcing her to switch genders through a black elixir.

In The Oz Kids, Mombi, voiced by Darlene Conley, restores her powers and kidnaps Glinda, the Tin Man, the Scarecrow, the Cowardly Lion, the Nome King, Dorothy, and her husband, Zeb, in a bid to take over Oz. She also pursues their children, who attempt to keep Mombi from accessing the Magic Belt. Dot, Dorothy's daughter, manages to trick Mombi into drinking from the forbidden fountain, which causes Mombi to lose her memory. Dot then tells Mombi that she's an kindly old woman who loves children, who lives in a castle in the sky.

In the 2024 film Wicked, Shiz University students, including Glinda and Elphaba, are instructed to welcome a Professor Mombi to the faculty, but the character remains offscreen.

In the 2026 independent film, Gale: The Yellow Brick Road, Mombi disguises herself as Doctor Appleton, to torture Emily Gale, and to try to get her “rightful” throne back.
