= Jack Pumpkinhead =

Fictional character from the Land of Oz

- Oz character
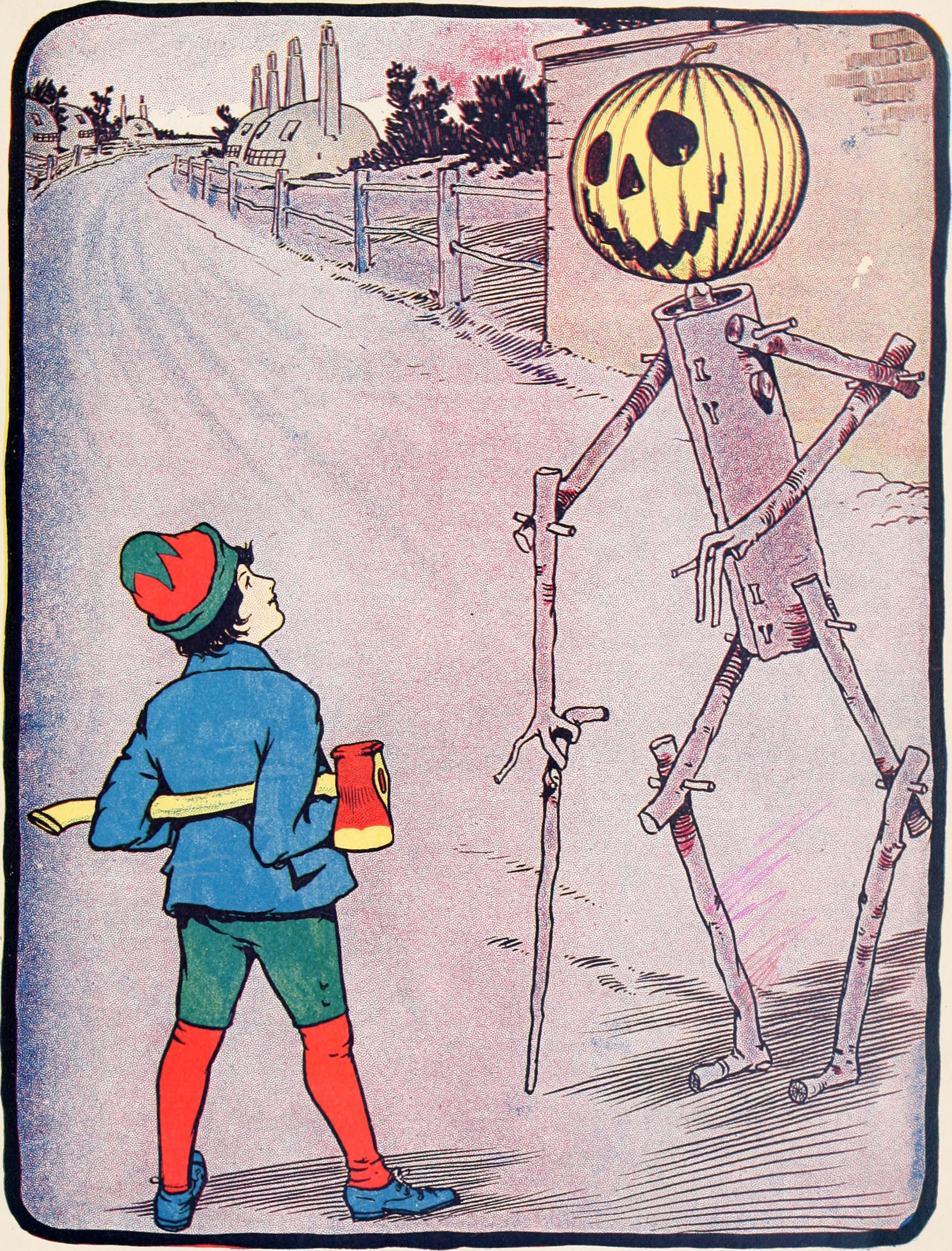
- Illustration by John R. Neill from The Marvelous Land of Oz
- First appearance: The Marvelous Land of Oz (1904)
- Created by: L. Frank Baum
- Portrayed by: Brian Henson (head, Return to Oz); Stewart Larange (body, Return to Oz)
- Voiced by: Paul Lynde (Journey Back to Oz); Brian Henson (Return to Oz); JP Karliak (Dorothy and the Wizard of Oz)

In-universe information
- Species: Animated Simulacrum
- Gender: Male
- Title: Adviser to Ozma of Oz
- Occupation: Pumpkin farmer
- Family: Tippetarius (father); Mombi (vivifier)
- Nationality: Gillikin

Jack Pumpkinhead is a fictional character from the Land of Oz who appears in several of the classic children's series of Oz books by American author L. Frank Baum. Jack first appeared as a main character in the second Oz book by Baum, The Marvelous Land of Oz (1904), and returned often in subsequent books. He got the starring role in Ruth Plumly Thompson's 1929 book Jack Pumpkinhead of Oz.

== The classic Oz books ==
Jack's incredibly tall and skinny figure is made from tree limbs and jointed with wooden pegs. He has a large carved jack-o'-lantern for a head, which is where he gets his name (unlike most jack-o'-lanterns, the pumpkin seeds and other pumpkin guts were not removed so it substitutes for his brain).

Jack was made by a little boy named Tip to scare his guardian, an old witch named Mombi. From Mombi's chest he took some old clothes for Jack; purple trousers, a red shirt, a pink vest with white polka dots, and stockings, to which he added a pair of his shoes. When Mombi saw Jack, she almost smashed him to pieces. Instead, she decided to test her new Powder of Life on him. The powder worked and Jack came to life.

Jack is not known for his intelligence, which seems to depend on the quality and number of the seeds in his pumpkin-head at that time. However, he manages to come up with random bits of wisdom and common sense often. For example, after bringing Jack to life, Mombi has the following exchange with him:

Even Mombi was not without a curious interest in the man her magic had brought to life; for, after staring at him intently, she presently asked:

"What do you know?"

"Well, that is hard to tell," replied Jack. "For although I feel that I know a tremendous lot, I am not yet aware how much there is in the world to find out about. It will take me a little time to discover whether I am very wise or very foolish."

Although Jack Pumpkinhead would not get tired from walking, his joints would still wear out. To remedy this, Tip created the Sawhorse to serve as Jack's mode of transportation. By the end of the second Oz book, Tip, who was originally born Ozma, is changed back into a female by the same magic that made him male. Jack notes that he no longer has a father.

In the fifth Oz book The Road to Oz (1909), Jack has settled in a large pumpkin-shaped house near the Tin Woodman's castle in Winkie Country. Jack spends much of his time growing pumpkins to replace his old heads, which eventually spoil and need to be replaced. Princess Ozma, now recognized as his mother, carves new heads for Jack when necessary. The old heads are buried in a graveyard on his property. In the sixth Oz book The Emerald City of Oz (1910), it is revealed that Jack designed a five-storey, jewel-encrusted, corn-shaped mansion for the Scarecrow to live in.

== In Thompson and Neill ==
In the continued series after Baum's death in 1919, Jack Pumpkinhead had to wait until the 23rd Oz book to get a book named after himself along with the starring role. Jack Pumpkinhead of Oz was written by Ruth Plumly Thompson, the writer who continued the Oz books after the death of L. Frank Baum. In the book, Peter (the little-boy baseball pitcher from Philadelphia), while reminiscing about his previous visit to Oz, suddenly finds himself landing right into Jack Pumpkinhead's front yard in the Winkie Country. Peter and Jack set off together for the Emerald City, but take a wrong turn, ending up traveling through the Quadling Country.

At one point in the book, Peter combats darkness by lighting a candle and placing it in Jack's empty head. Jack notes that it makes him feel "brighter", but also "A little light headed".

John R. Neill includes Jack in his final Oz book, The Runaway in Oz. In both the Thompson and Neill books, Jack loses his head for varying periods of time; In Neill, his headless stick body is dragged about the countryside of Oz by his companions.

== In comics ==
Jack Pumpkinhead was one of the Freedom Fighters in the 1995 comic book Oz, created by Ralph Griffth, Stuart Kerr, and Bill Bryan, and published by Caliber Comics. Jack was killed during the company-wide crossover, Daemonstorm, after having been possessed by one of the demons.

Jack also appears in the comic book The Oz/Wonderland Chronicles, created by Ben Avery and Casey Heying, which is published twice a year by Buy Me Toys.

In Neil Gaiman's The Sandman series, Mervyn Pumpkinhead, who is clearly modeled on Jack, works for Morpheus in the Dreaming, where he paints and builds dreams.

In issue 101 of Fables, Bufkin the winged monkey finds his way back to Oz's neighboring country Ev. He runs across Jack Pumpkinhead, the Sawhorse, and Bungle. Upon hearing of their resistance to the Nome King, Bufkin pledges to lead them in the revolution. This is an allusion to the Baum novel Ozma of Oz and/or the comics series Oz mentioned above.

== Portrayals ==
Jack Pumpkinhead was first portrayed on stage by Hal Godfrey in the 1905 stage play, The Woggle-Bug by Baum and Frederic Chapin. The play failed in Chicago and was never revived or recast. Bronson Ward, Jr. played the role in the 1908 film, The Fairylogue and Radio-Plays. Although photographs suggest something more realistic than the makeup worn by Godfrey was used for the film, the popular character makes no appearances in the productions of The Oz Film Manufacturing Company.

George Wadsworth plays "Jack the Pumpkinhead" in Barry Mahon's The Wonderful Land of Oz (1969).

Without a first name, Jack appears, voiced by Paul Lynde, in the animated movie sequel Journey Back to Oz (which had a different outcome for the character).

Robert Ridgely voices Jack Pumpkinhead in the 1980 TV special Thanksgiving in the Land of Oz.

Stewart Larange, an exceptionally thin actor, portrayed Jack in the live-action movie Return to Oz (1985) while Brian Henson was the animatronic puppeteer and provided his voice.

Ross Maplettoft played Jack Pumpkinhead Sr. in the animated TV series The Oz Kids (1996–1997). Jack Sr. has a son named Jack Pumpkinhead Jr. His son likes to adventure with his friends.

Viktor Sukhorukov provided the voice of Jack Pumpkinhead in the 2000 Russian adaptation of The Marvelous Land of Oz, Adventures in the Emerald City: Princess Ozma.

Gerran Howell portrayed Jack in the NBC series Emerald City.

Jack Pumpkinhead appears in the animated series Dorothy and the Wizard of Oz voiced by JP Karliak. First appearing in "Halloween Heist", Jack was created by Wilhelmina using the Potion of Life on a jack-o'-lantern to give Dorothy and her friends a scare on Halloween. However, he is too simple-minded and friendly to be scary.
