= Peter Brown (Oz) =

- Oz character
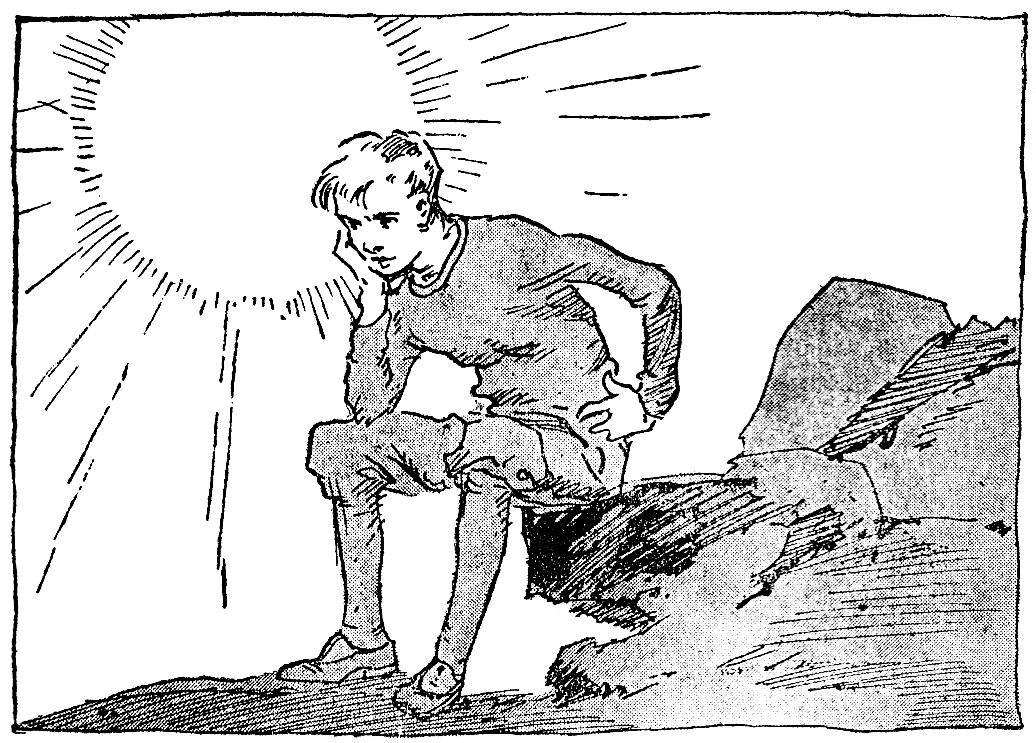
- An illustration by John R. Neill in The Gnome King of Oz (1927)
- First appearance: The Gnome King of Oz (1927)
- Created by: Ruth Plumly Thompson

In-universe information
- Species: human
- Gender: male
- Nationality: American

Peter Brown is a major character in the Oz novels of Ruth Plumly Thompson, who continued the series of Oz books after the death of their creator, L. Frank Baum. Thompson used Peter as the protagonist in three of her books: The Gnome King of Oz (1927), Jack Pumpkinhead of Oz (1929), and Pirates in Oz (1931).

Peter constitutes the first time in the Oz series in which a boy from the United States serves as the protagonist in the novels, rather than a supporting character. (Contrast Zeb in Dorothy and the Wizard in Oz, Button-Bright in The Road to Oz and other books, and Bob Up in Thompson's earlier The Cowardly Lion of Oz.) Like Trot, Peter arrives in Oz having already read an Oz book.

When Thompson introduces him in Gnome King, Peter is a nine-year-old boy from Philadelphia. Peter is being raised by his grandfather; he is one of the long list of orphans or apparent orphans in children's literature (they are notably frequent in the Oz books themselves). His travels to the world of Oz provide him opportunities to display courage, independence, loyalty and other traditional virtues; in this, he differs from Button-Bright and Bob Up, younger children with less effect on their plots. At the end of Gnome King, Peter has a chance to become a prince of Oz — which he rejects, out of loyalty to his friends and fellow baseball-team members at home in Philadelphia. Peter brings bags of gold home to his grandfather.

His attitude toward life is somewhat insouciant and devil-may-care; in the opening chapter of Jack Pumpkinhead he wonders idly if "the Gnome King has gotten into any more mischief" — giving little serious consideration to the most persistent villain in the Oz universe.

Pirates in Oz, the third book in which Peter appears, contains a contradiction on Peter's age. The book identifies him as eleven years old, but also states that five years have passed since the events of Gnome King, which would make Peter fourteen, however, she may be referring to four years in Oz, and not Philadelphia.

Thompson herself noted her tendency to favor boy heroes, in contrast to Baum's preference for girl protagonists (Dorothy Gale, Princess Ozma, Betsy Bobbin, and Trot). Peter Brown is the most prominent of these boy characters.
