= The Gnome King of Oz =

Book by Ruth Plumly Thompson

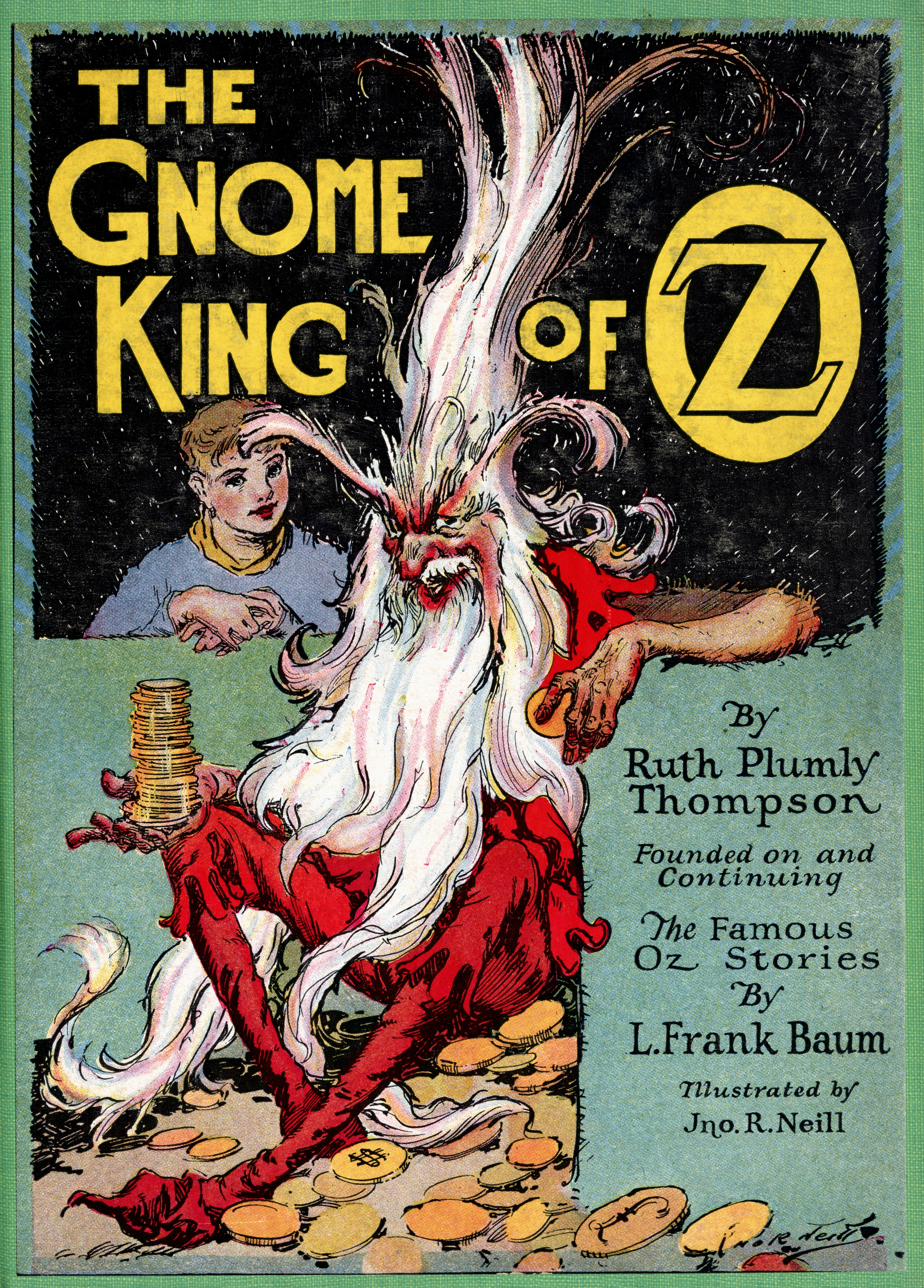
- Cover of The Gnome King of Oz.
- Author: Ruth Plumly Thompson
- Illustrator: John R. Neill
- Language: English
- Series: The Oz books
- Genre: Children's novel
- Publisher: Reilly & Lee
- Publication date: 1927
- Publication place: United States
- Media type: Print (Hardcover)
- Pages: 282
- Preceded by: The Hungry Tiger of Oz
- Followed by: The Giant Horse of Oz

The Gnome King of Oz (1927) is the twenty-first book in the Oz series created by L. Frank Baum and his successors, and the seventh by Ruth Plumly Thompson. Like nineteen of the twenty previous books, it was illustrated by John R. Neill. The book was followed by The Giant Horse of Oz (1928).

== Plot ==
Patch is the country of the Quilties, a land of seamstresses and quiltmakers; it lies in the Quadling quadrant of Oz. Its people have a serious problem. Their queen, Cross Patch the Sixth, has gone to pieces—literally; small pieces too. To find her successor, the land's Chief Scrapper and Prime Piecer unwind the Spool of Succession, and follow where the golden thread leads. It leads, in this instance, to the Emerald City, where it selects Scraps, the Patchwork Girl of Oz (first introduced in her eponymously titled novel, the seventh Oz book by L. Frank Baum) to be the new queen. The two Quilties, used to resistance from Queens-to-be (it's not that good a job), kidnap Scraps.

Meanwhile, Peter Brown, a boy from Philadelphia, is transported by a balloon bird to the Runaway Island, where Ruggedo, the wicked Gnome King has been exiled for five years (see Kabumpo in Oz). A seaquake reveals the sunken pirate ship of Polacky the Plunderer—which contains the magic chest of Soob the Sorcerer. The chest holds several magic treasures, including a magic cloak that is supposed to render the wearer invisible and teleport him anywhere he chooses. But the cloak is torn and does not work. The ship, however, derelict as it is, allows Peter and Ruggedo to drift to the Land of Ev.

Promising to make Peter a general in his army, Ruggedo returns to the Gnome Kingdom and forces the current king, Kaliko, to abdicate in his favor. Ruggedo's plan is to have the cloak mended, then use it to fly to the Emerald City and recover his magic belt, with all its power — but he learns that the tricky repair job can only be done properly by the expert tailors in Patch. With Peter, he makes his way to Patch, where he offers Peter as a slave in return for the repair of the cloak. The Patch ministers accept this offer and the cloak is repaired.

Peter meets Scraps and makes other new friends, including Grumpy the Bear and Ozwold the Ostrich. Together they escape from Patch and set out for the Emerald City in order to warn Ozma about Ruggedo's plans. Meanwhile, using the power of the repaired cloak, Ruggedo becomes invisible and teleports to the Emerald City, where he causes some mischief before Peter arrives. Still invisible, Ruggedo steals the magic belt. He is about to use its powers to teleport Ozma and her friends to the bottom of the ocean, but Peter overcomes him by throwing a "silence stone", one of the treasures he had taken from the sunken pirate ship, at Ruggedo's head, which robs Ruggedo of the power of speech. Since the magic belt only responds to spoken commands, this renders Ruggedo harmless, and the Wizard of Oz makes him visible again. Ozma makes Peter a Prince of Oz, but the boy chooses to return to Philadelphia; he can't let down his team.

== Reception ==
The Atlantic City Sunday Press celebrated The Gnome King of Oz as "Good Reading for Rainy Day". "Without diminishing praise due Mr. Baum for inventing so clever a story-idea," the reviewer wrote, "Miss Thompson tells a story with more facility. She never lets the interest slacken... When, as in the case of The Gnome King of Oz, the story-skill, the jollity, the succession of events, all continue to be so vigorously alive, the author deserves naught but praise." The Boston Globe concurred, calling it a "pleasing new Oz tale for young children."

The Oz books
Previous book: The Hungry Tiger of Oz	The Gnome King of Oz; 1927	Next book: The Giant Horse of Oz
