= Copyright status of The Wonderful Wizard of Oz and related works in the United States =

The copyright status of The Wonderful Wizard of Oz and related works in the United States is complicated for several reasons. The book series is very long-running, and written by multiple authors, so the books often fall on opposite sides of eligibility for copyright laws. There have also been multiple adaptations across many different media, which enjoy different kinds of copyright protection. The copyright law of the United States has changed many times, and impacted Oz works every time. As of 2026, thirty-one Oz books and five films are in the public domain. Starting in 2019, an Oz book has entered the public domain every year. Barring another extension of copyright terms, all of the Famous Forty will be in the public domain by 2059.

This page explains the copyright status of those works in the US only, and the copyright status of the works may vary by country. For example, L. Frank Baum died in 1919, and that means that his works entered the public domain in 1990 in most countries and in 2020 in Mexico (as Mexico has a life plus 100 year term).

== Books ==
=== L. Frank Baum ===
When L. Frank Baum began publishing the Oz books, the copyright law in effect was the Copyright Act of 1831, which provided a 28-year term with a possible fourteen more years upon renewal of the copyright. However, the Copyright Act of 1909 retroactively affected Baum's books, allowing a 28-year renewal for fifty-six total years of copyright protection. The L. Frank Baum Trust renewed the copyright on all of Baum's Oz novels.

The Wonderful Wizard of Oz was published in 1900, and was the first to enter the public domain in 1956. This allowed Reilly & Lee, the publisher of all the other Oz books (as well as Baum's other books) to issue their own edition of The Wizard of Oz, which had previously been published by George M. Hill Company and later by the Bobbs-Merrill Company after Hill went bankrupt.

The Marvelous Land of Oz, which was published in 1904, followed suit and entered public domain in 1960.

All of Baum's subsequent Oz books, published between 1907 and 1920, had their copyright extended by subsequent laws. Between 1962 and 1974, Congress passed nine copyright acts extending the copyright one or two years each time (these acts also introduced the rule that rounds the copyright term up to the end of that calendar year). This ensured that all works published after September 1906 (and renewed as necessary) stayed copyrighted until the Copyright Act of 1976 took effect. The 1976 Act extended the renewal to 47 years, meaning works could stay copyrighted for 75 years after publication. Thus, the rest of Baum's Oz books did not enter public domain until the 75-year terms were up. Ozma of Oz (published in 1907) was the first of these to enter the public domain in 1983, and the subsequent books followed, with Glinda of Oz (published in 1920) finally entering the public domain in 1996.

This accounts for all of the apocryphal Oz books that sprang forth in the 1980s; once more Oz books entered the public domain, it allowed other authors to use those elements in their own works.

All of Baum's other works—non-Oz books, plays, and musicals—are also in the public domain, and have been since 1995 at the latest.

=== Ruth Plumly Thompson ===
The first two books written by Ruth Plumly Thompson, The Royal Book of Oz (published in 1921) and Kabumpo in Oz (published 1922), entered the public domain 75 years later (1997 and 1998, respectively) pursuant to the Copyright Act of 1976. The next twelve books (The Cowardly Lion of Oz through Speedy in Oz, published between 1923 and 1934) were still copyrighted when the 1998 Sonny Bono Act extended the copyright term a further twenty years, meaning works would now be copyrighted for 95 years. These twelve books of Thompson's therefore did not begin to enter the public domain until 2019, with The Cowardly Lion of Oz coming first and Grampa in Oz following in 2020, The Lost King of Oz in 2021, and The Hungry Tiger of Oz in 2022. By 2030, all of them will be in the public domain.

Thompson did not renew the copyright on her last five canonical books: The Wishing Horse of Oz, Captain Salt in Oz, Handy Mandy in Oz, The Silver Princess in Oz, and Ozoplaning with the Wizard of Oz. Thus, these books entered the public domain 28 years after publication, between 1963 and 1967. Congress amended the copyright law in 1992 so there would subsequently be automatic renewals of copyright. Therefore, the copyright on Thompson's deutero-canonical books Yankee in Oz (published in 1972) and The Enchanted Island of Oz (published in 1976) will not expire until 2068 and 2072 respectively.

=== John R. Neill ===
John R. Neill's three canonical Oz books—The Wonder City of Oz, The Scalawagons of Oz, and Lucky Bucky in Oz—were published between 1940 and 1942. Neill's heirs renewed the copyrights, so these books will not enter the public domain until 2036 through 2038, pursuant to the 95-year term. A fourth Oz book by Neill—The Runaway in Oz—was written by Neill in 1943. It was published posthumously in 1995. It was edited, expanded and illustrated by Eric Shanower, so The Runaway in Oz will enter the public domain 70 years after the death of the last surviving author. Since Eric Shanower is still alive, The Runaway in Oz will remain copyrighted until at least 2094.

=== Jack Snow ===
Snow published two canonical Oz books: The Magical Mimics in Oz in 1946, and The Shaggy Man of Oz in 1949. The copyright was never renewed on either of these, so they entered the public domain in 1974 and 1977, respectively.

=== Rachel Cosgrove ===
The Hidden Valley of Oz was published by Rachel Cosgrove in 1951, had the copyright renewed, and therefore will enter public domain in 2047.

Cosgrove also wrote The Wicked Witch of Oz in 1954. However, it was not published until 1993. Since it was published after 1977, it will remain copyrighted for seventy years after the author's death. Cosgrove died in 1998, so The Wicked Witch of Oz will enter public domain in 2069.

=== Eloise Jarvis McGraw and Lauren Lynn McGraw ===
The McGraws' canonical book, Merry Go Round in Oz, was published in 1963. The copyright was renewed, so it will enter the public domain in 2059. It will be the last book in the Famous Forty to enter the public domain.

The McGraws co-wrote another Oz book, The Forbidden Fountain of Oz, which was published in 1980. Its copyright lasts for seventy years after the death of last living author. Lauren McGraw is still alive, so The Forbidden Fountain of Oz will enter the public domain seventy years after her death. Since it will remain copyrighted until at least 2094, it will be the last deutero-canonical work to enter the public domain.

Eloise McGraw wrote The Rundelstone of Oz by herself, and it was published posthumously in 2001. Since Eloise McGraw died in 2000, it will enter the public domain in 2071. All other Oz books (with the exception of the special cases listed below) are still copyrighted under the current laws of 70 years after author's death. Please note that the illustrations and the cover art are considered separate works from the text, so they may enter the public domain at a different date.

== Table of canonical and deutero-canonical Oz books ==
Order	Title	Year published	Author	Year entered/will enter public domain
1	The Wonderful Wizard of Oz	1900	L. Frank Baum	1956
2	The Marvelous Land of Oz	1904	L. Frank Baum	1960
3	Ozma of Oz	1907	L. Frank Baum	1983
4	Dorothy and the Wizard in Oz	1908	L. Frank Baum	1984
5	The Road to Oz	1909	L. Frank Baum	1985
6	The Emerald City of Oz	1910	L. Frank Baum	1986
7	The Patchwork Girl of Oz	1913	L. Frank Baum	1989
8	Tik-Tok of Oz	1914	L. Frank Baum	1990
9	The Scarecrow of Oz	1915	L. Frank Baum	1991
10	Rinkitink in Oz	1916	L. Frank Baum	1992
11	The Lost Princess of Oz	1917	L. Frank Baum	1993
12	The Tin Woodman of Oz	1918	L. Frank Baum	1994
13	The Magic of Oz	1919	L. Frank Baum	1995
14	Glinda of Oz	1920	L. Frank Baum	1996
15	The Royal Book of Oz	1921	Ruth Plumly Thompson	1997
16	Kabumpo in Oz	1922	Ruth Plumly Thompson	1998
17	The Cowardly Lion of Oz	1923	Ruth Plumly Thompson	2019
18	Grampa in Oz	1924	Ruth Plumly Thompson	2020
19	The Lost King of Oz	1925	Ruth Plumly Thompson	2021
20	The Hungry Tiger of Oz	1926	Ruth Plumly Thompson	2022
21	The Gnome King of Oz	1927	Ruth Plumly Thompson	2023
22	The Giant Horse of Oz	1928	Ruth Plumly Thompson	2024
23	Jack Pumpkinhead of Oz	1929	Ruth Plumly Thompson	2025
24	The Yellow Knight of Oz	1930	Ruth Plumly Thompson	2026
25	Pirates in Oz	1931	Ruth Plumly Thompson	2027
26	The Purple Prince of Oz	1932	Ruth Plumly Thompson	2028
27	Ojo in Oz	1933	Ruth Plumly Thompson	2029
28	Speedy in Oz	1934	Ruth Plumly Thompson	2030
29	The Wishing Horse of Oz	1935	Ruth Plumly Thompson	1963
30	Captain Salt in Oz	1936	Ruth Plumly Thompson	1964
31	Handy Mandy in Oz	1937	Ruth Plumly Thompson	1965
32	The Silver Princess in Oz	1938	Ruth Plumly Thompson	1966
33	Ozoplaning with the Wizard of Oz	1939	Ruth Plumly Thompson	1967
	Yankee in Oz	1972	Ruth Plumly Thompson	2068
	The Enchanted Island of Oz	1976	Ruth Plumly Thompson	2072
34	The Wonder City of Oz	1940	John R. Neill	2036
35	The Scalawagons of Oz	1941	John R. Neill	2037
36	Lucky Bucky in Oz	1942	John R. Neill	2038
	The Runaway in Oz	1995	John R. Neill & Eric Shanower	70 years after Eric Shanower dies
37	The Magical Mimics in Oz	1946	Jack Snow	1974
38	The Shaggy Man of Oz	1949	Jack Snow	1977
39	The Hidden Valley of Oz	1951	Rachel R. Cosgrove	2047
	The Wicked Witch of Oz	1993	Rachel R. Cosgrove	2069 (text only) 70 years after Eric Shanower dies (illustrations and cover art only)
40	Merry Go Round in Oz	1963	Eloise Jarvis McGraw & Lauren Lynn McGraw	2059
	The Rundelstone of Oz	2001	Eloise Jarvis McGraw	2071 (text only) 70 years after Eric Shanower dies (illustrations and cover art only)
	The Forbidden Fountain of Oz	1980	Eloise Jarvis McGraw & Lauren Lynn McGraw	70 years after Lauren McGraw dies (text only) 2061 (illustrations and cover art only)

== Infringements on the Oz books ==
=== Frank Baum ===
Baum's son, Frank Joslyn Baum, wrote his own Oz story – The Laughing Dragon of Oz. The text barely mentioned Oz, and no Oz characters were used except for his own and a brief mention of the Wizard. He tried to get it published by Reilly & Lee, but they refused, and he published it with Whitman Publishing Company in 1934. This could have been an infringing work at the time – all of the Oz books were still copyrighted, and the rights were held by Frank Baum's mother, Maud Gage Baum. Both Maud Baum and Reilly & Lee sued Frank Baum and Whitman Publishing. The case was settled and The Laughing Dragon stayed out of print until 2006. However, its copyright was renewed in 1962, so it will remain copyrighted until 2030, per the 95-year term. The Laughing Dragon of Oz was the first high-profile case of infringement on the Oz books, and it would be the first of many.

=== Alexander Volkov ===
Alexander Volkov's six Oz books were published in the Soviet Union, so they are subject to Russian copyright law. The first book – The Wizard of the Emerald City – was published in 1939, when The Wizard of Oz was still copyrighted. The Wizard of the Emerald City is an adaptation of The Wizard of Oz, borrowing liberally from the original book. The subsequent four books were published between 1963 and 1970, and the last one – The Secret of the Deserted Castle – was published in 1982. At the time of publication, The Wizard of Oz and The Land of Oz were in the public domain, but the other Oz books were still copyrighted. However, Volkov's books are mostly original sequels to The Wizard of the Emerald City, so whether they are infringing or not is difficult to say. Barely any of the elements from later Oz books are featured in Volkov's works, so most likely they were not infringing.

The Soviet Union did not have international copyright relations until 1973, when it joined the 1971 Paris version of the Universal Copyright Convention. This meant that when The Secret of the Deserted Castle was published in 1982, it was automatically copyrighted in the United States. However, the UCC did not work retroactively, so Volkov's first five works were not copyrighted in the US.

Russia joined the Berne convention in 1995, which ensured that the US and Russia (and all other member countries) had to retroactively recognize all existing copyrights in the opposite countries. That included Volkov's first five books, which were now copyrighted under US law.

The copyright lasts for seventy years after the author's death in Russia, as of a 2004 amendment. Volkov died in 1977, so all of his books will enter the public domain in 2048. In the meantime, other Russian authors are continuing Volkov's Oz series, much as American authors posthumously continued Baum's series. Volkov's works received faithful and legitimate English translations by Peter Blystone in 1991, 1993, and 2007.

=== March Laumer ===
March Laumer infringed on both American and Russian Oz writers, though he never saw any repercussions because his works were not considered significant enough to fight. He published Oz books between 1978 and 1999, but incorporated elements from all the preceding Oz writers, most of whose works were still copyrighted.

He collaborated with Chris Dulabone to release an English translation of The Yellow Fog in 1986. The two writers then adapted The Seven Underground Kings into The Underground Kings of Oz in 1993. Both of these works, while clearly infringing on Volkov's works, were legal in the US at the time. This preceded Russia's accession to the Berne convention, and the US did not recognize the copyright on any Russian work published before 1973 (The Yellow Fog and The Seven Underground Kings were published in 1970 and 1964, respectively).

== Feature film adaptations ==
=== Silent Oz films ===
The copyright on the 1910 film entered public domain in 1939. Baum's Oz Film Manufacturing Company films entered public domain in 1942. The 1925 Larry Semon film version of The Wizard of Oz entered the public domain in 1954. These films remain the only extant Oz live-action films in the public domain.

=== 1939 film ===
The 1939 version of The Wizard of Oz is the most well-known adaptation of The Wizard of Oz. Its copyright was renewed in 1967, so it will remain copyrighted for a 95-year term, entering the public domain in 2035. This has caused issues for most subsequent Oz adaptations, especially because WB/Turner Entertainment Co. (the current owners of the copyright), have been very aggressive in protecting the film's copyright. They also went after potential merchandise for 2013's Legends of Oz: Dorothy's Return.

In a landmark case, WB v. AVELA (2011), the US Eighth Circuit ruled that any visual depictions and aspects of characters in public domain developed solely for copyrighted films are under copyright protection. This was significant, because the film is not a particularly faithful adaptation of the book, so much of it is still protected. (In the case, AVELA was using the promotional materials for the film, and the court ruled that those images are not copyrighted and therefore may be used, but only those exact images may be used.)

=== Journey Back to Oz ===
Journey Back to Oz was a 1974 animated film that served as an official sequel to the 1939 film, as well as a very loose adaptation of The Land of Oz (which was in public domain by then). It is just about the only film that could borrow from the 1939 film without issue. It was copyrighted in 1971 as it was nearing completion.

=== Return to Oz ===
The 1985 film Return to Oz was based on The Land of Oz and Ozma of Oz. Disney owned the rights to adapt all of Baum's books except The Wizard of Oz, but this did not matter because by 1985 both The Marvelous Land of Oz and Ozma of Oz were in the public domain.

The only element that Return to Oz used from the 1939 film was the ruby slippers – in the book, there were silver shoes. The ruby slippers had become so iconic due to the MGM film, Disney paid handsomely for the rights to use them.

=== Oz the Great and Powerful ===
The 2013 film Oz the Great and Powerful was technically a prequel to the 1939 film, but it was not allowed to be considered as such. The filmmakers had to toe a fine line between calling the film to mind but not infringing on it. To that end, they had a copyright expert on set to ensure that no infringement occurred.

The copyright expert had to make sure that the Wicked Witch's shade of green was distinct enough from Margaret Hamilton's shade of green. The expert also ensured that the Emerald City was not too close in appearance to the Emerald City in the 1939 film.

While WB and Disney did not engage in a copyright battle, they did file rival trademarks. Disney filed a trademark on "Oz the Great and Powerful." One week later, WB filed its own trademark for "The Great and Powerful Oz." The US Patent and Trademark Office suspended WB's attempt at a trademark because Disney had filed basically the same one a week earlier.

== The Wicked Witch of the West ==
The Wicked Witch of the West is widely regarded as one of the most iconic villains in popular culture. While the character's most well-known depiction is Margaret Hamilton's portrayal in the 1939 film, this version, characterized by her green skin, is protected under copyright. Notably, in Baum's original text, the character does not have green skin. As a result, only the original, non-green-skinned version of the Witch is in the public domain, while Margaret Hamilton's green-skinned interpretation remains copyrighted. The Wicked Witch is not given a name in the books, so subsequent authors gave her their own names. All of these names are protected under copyright as part of their respective works, which means new creators have to keep coming up with their own version. Some of the most well-known incarnations of the Wicked Witch of the West are "Elphaba" (Wicked), "Theodora" (Oz the Great and Powerful), "Zelena" (Once Upon a Time), "Evillene" (The Wiz), and "Azkadellia" (Tin Man). There are similar issues regarding portrayals of the Wicked Witch of the East, but she is not as prevalent in the public consciousness as her Western counterpart.
