= The Ozmapolitan of Oz =

1986 novel written and illustrated by Dick Martin

- First edition
- Author: Dick Martin
- Illustrator: Dick Martin
- Language: English
- Series: The Oz Books
- Genre: Fantasy
- Publisher: International Wizard of Oz Club
- Publication date: 1986
- Publication place: United States
- Media type: Print
- Pages: 104 pp.
- Preceded by: The Forbidden Fountain of Oz
- Followed by: The Wicked Witch of Oz

The Ozmapolitan of Oz is a 1986 novel written and illustrated by Dick Martin. The novel is an unofficial entry in the long-running Oz series written by L. Frank Baum and various successors.

== Authorship ==
Like his predecessor John R. Neill, Dick Martin was a veteran Oz illustrator who moved into Oz authorship; The Ozmapolitan of Oz is Martin's single sustained work of Oz fiction.

As both author and artist, Martin had control over the total expression of his fiction. Like most Oz authors, he supplied a human protagonist for young readers to identify with; unusually, he made his protagonist a teenager, a fifteen-year-old boy. In his illustrations, Martin made Dorothy Gale appear somewhat older than she is generally portrayed.

== The term "Ozmapolitan" ==
The word "Ozmopolitan" was first used in 1904, in promotional material created by Baum's publisher Reilly & Britton. The idea was that the Wizard of Oz started an Oz newspaper so titled (a conceit that Martin adopts for his novel). Reilly & Britton issued press releases in this Oz-newspaper form in 1904 and 1905, publicizing Baum's The Marvelous Land of Oz and related projects. It is possible though not certain that Baum himself wrote some of these early "Ozmapolitan" press releases. The publisher (under its later name Reilly & Lee) issued more "Ozmapolitan" press releases in the 1920s, to publicize the novels of Ruth Plumly Thompson, and in the 1960s for other products (including Merry Go Round in Oz, with illustrations by Dick Martin). Three decades later, Hungry Tiger Press used the same publicity technique for issues of its Oz-story Magazine.

The name has also been employed as the title of a periodical published by the International Wizard of Oz Club, edited and illustrated by Martin. Other fan literature has used the word as well.

== Plot ==
Septimius Septentrion is three weeks into a job as a printer at the Ozmapolitan in the Emerald City of Oz. A chance meeting with Princess Dorothy leads to a plan to drum up news to promote the sleepy Ozite newspaper. Accompanied by a mifket named Jinx and Dorothy's cat Eureka, "Tim" and Dorothy embark on a cross-country trip through the Winkie Country. The plan is to meet the Scarecrow at his corncob-shaped residence; but the plan quickly goes awry. The party encounter a fortune-teller and receive cryptic gingerbread-fortune-cookie predictions: Dorothy's is "A Fat Chance," Tim's is "A Blue Moon," and Jinx's is "A Silent Melody."

The Expeditioneers, as they call themselves, learn the meanings of these fortunes as they progress through an Art Colony, a Game Preserve, and a long and complex subterranean journey. They encounter strange creatures and phenomena, including a Trade Wind, an out-of-date inventor, and a dragon-like Tyrannicus Terrificus. They rescue a frozen (and therefore silent) water spirit named Melody, a cousin of the rainbow fairy Polychrome. Melody later repays the favor by saving the travelers from the dragon.

After a long spell lost in caverns, the group meets up with the Scarecrow and his bosom friend the Tin Woodman, who are sailing in the Scarecrow's new boat, the Blue Moon. They all return to the Emerald City, with abundant material for the Ozmapolitan. In the process, Tim's secret royal background is revealed.

== The Art Colony ==
Given the fact that Martin was an artist before he became an author, his treatment of the Art Colony in his novel's Chapter Six, "Artistic Interpretations," is noteworthy. Dorothy and her friends have their portraits painted by a family of animated paintbrushes. The portraits are wildly unrealistic and distorted in varying ways — Jinx gets a cubist portrait — and the travelers are appalled to discover that they have been magically transformed to resemble their portraits, instead of the other way around. Dorothy's portrait depicts her as "a willowy, boneless, wraith-like creature with soulful eyes, gazing off in different directions." Suddenly her physical form possesses the same "elongated arms and snaky fingers...." Tim becomes "a lumpy, bow-legged clown with green skin, purple hair, and mismatched ears." Dorothy proclaims, "We're victims of a Modern Art movement." It is only with magical help (obtained from a fat man named Chance) that the sufferers can return to their natural forms. Martin may have been writing mainly to amuse his young readers; but his handling of the subject suggests that he was out of sympathy with much of twentieth-century art.

== Response ==
In 1987, a year after the appearance of The Ozmapolitan of Oz, Chris Dulabone published his The Colorful Kitten of Oz, in which Eureka is the title character. The book includes an afterword that addresses perceived inconsistencies in Martin's book.

The Oz books
Previous book: The Forbidden Fountain of Oz	The Ozmapolitan of Oz; 1986	Next book: The Wicked Witch of Oz
