= Kabumpo =

- Oz character
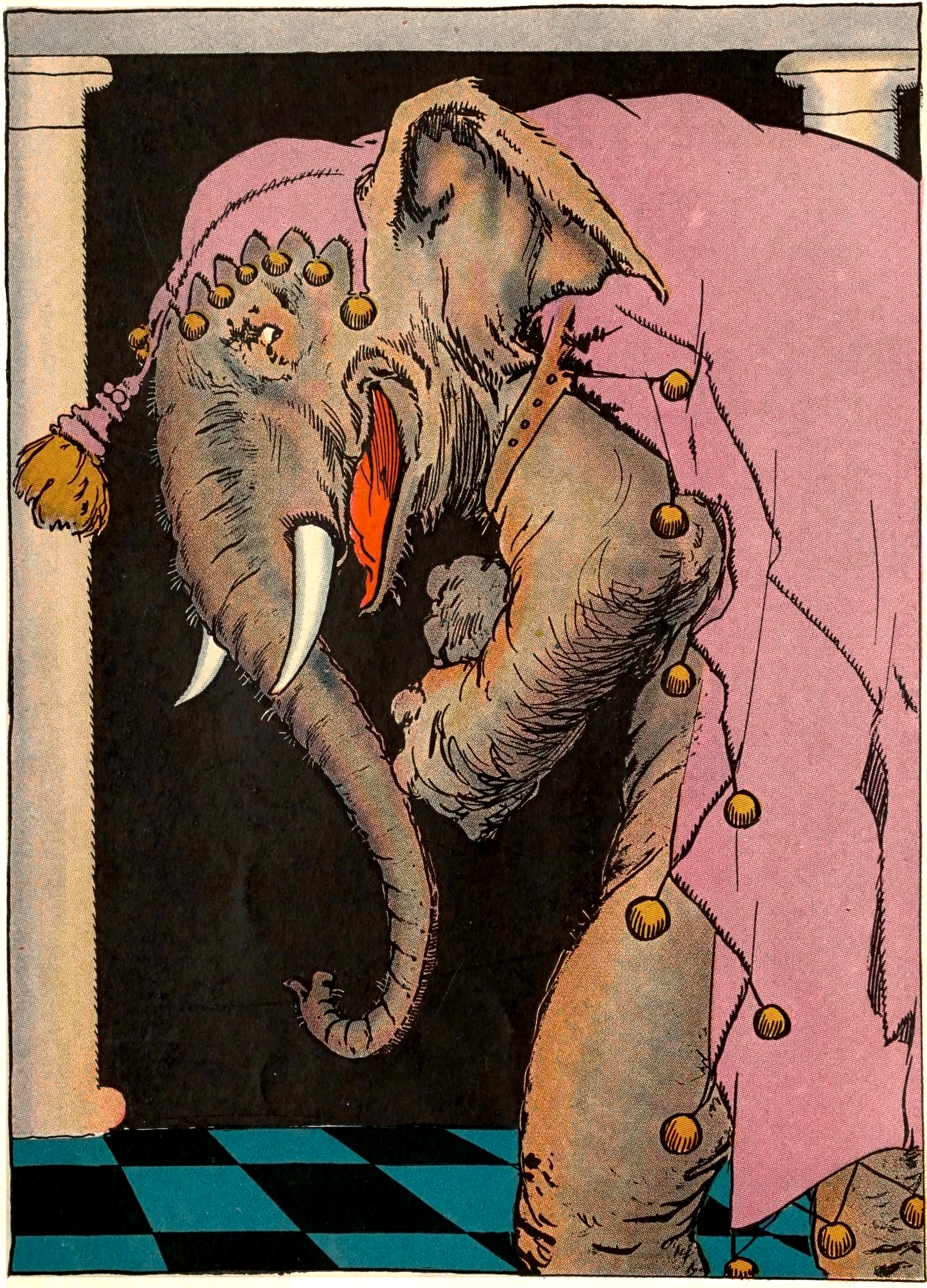
- Kabumpo in an illustration by John R. Neill
- First appearance: Kabumpo in Oz (1922)
- Created by: Ruth Plumly Thompson

In-universe information
- Nickname: Elegant Elephant of Pumperdink
- Species: Indian elephant
- Gender: male
- Title: Prince

Kabumpo, the Elegant Elephant of Pumperdink, is a character in the Oz books of Ruth Plumly Thompson. He is one of Thompson's most popular additions to the Oz cast, appearing as a major character four books in addition to various background appearances, including in books written by Thompson's successor, John R. Neill.

== History ==
Kabumpo first appears in Kabumpo in Oz, Thompson's second Oz book as a protagonist alongside Prince Pompadore of Pumperdink. He was originally a christening gift to the king of Pumperdink, Pompus. Kabumpo reappears to play major roles in The Lost King of Oz, The Purple Prince of Oz, and The Silver Princess in Oz. He had a less consequential role in The Wishing Horse of Oz.

Long-time Oz illustrator John R. Neill declared Kabumpo in Oz, which was the first book publicly credited to Thompson, to be among the very best Oz books published at that time. Neill made Kabumpo a denizen of the Emerald City, attended by Ojo, in his contributions to the series. In 1980, Eloise Jarvis McGraw and Lauren Lynn McGraw borrowed the character for The Forbidden Fountain of Oz, published by the International Wizard of Oz Club.

Kabumpo is known for his wisdom in Pumperdink, but that might be because he shines in comparison with other members of the court. He is overbearing, sarcastic, and extremely vain, but good-hearted.

Since the expiration of his first novel's copyright on 1 January 1998 (the last Thompson book to enter the public domain before the Copyright Term Extension Act took hold), Kabumpo may be used freely by any author. Of his Thompsonian appearances, only Purple Prince remains under copyright, with the expiration date being 1 January 2028.
