= Ruby slippers =

Magical shoes in The Wizard of Oz

- The Wizard of Oz element
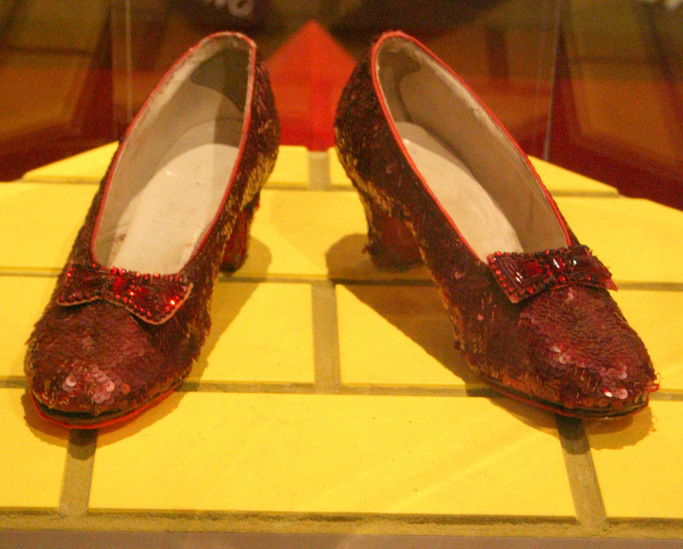
- One of the pairs used in The Wizard of Oz (1939), on display at the Smithsonian Institution National Museum of American History
- Publisher: Metro-Goldwyn-Mayer
- First appearance: The Wizard of Oz; 1939
- Created by: Gilbert Adrian (costume design)
- Based on: Silver Shoes by Frank Baum
- Genre: Fantasy

In-universe information
- Type: Magical slippers
- Owners: Wicked Witch of the East (formerly); Dorothy Gale: Ability to send Dorothy back home to Kansas; Protect the wearer

The ruby slippers are a pair of magical shoes worn by Dorothy Gale as played by Judy Garland in the 1939 Metro-Goldwyn-Mayer musical film The Wizard of Oz. Because of their iconic stature, they are as of December 2024 the most valuable items of film memorabilia in the world. Several pairs were made for the film, though the exact number is unknown. Five pairs are known to have survived; one pair was stolen from a museum in 2005 and recovered in 2018.

In L. Frank Baum's original 1900 novel, The Wonderful Wizard of Oz, on which the film is based, Dorothy wears Silver Shoes. However, the color of the shoes was changed to red to take advantage of the three-strip Technicolor film process used in some big-budget prestigious Hollywood films of the era. Screenwriter Noel Langley is credited with the idea.

== The slippers ==
=== The Wizard of Oz (1939) ===
In the MGM film, an adolescent farm girl named Dorothy Gale (played by Judy Garland), her dog Toto, and their Kansas farmhouse are swept into the air by a tornado and transported to the Land of Oz. The house falls on and kills the Wicked Witch of the East, freeing the Munchkins from her tyranny. Glinda, the Good Witch of the North arrives and shows Dorothy the dead woman's feet sticking out from under the house with the ruby slippers on them. When the Wicked Witch of the West comes to claim her dead sister's shoes, Glinda magically transfers them to Dorothy's feet. Glinda tells Dorothy never to take them off, as the slippers must be very powerful or the Wicked Witch would not want them so badly. Throughout the rest of the film, the Wicked Witch schemes to obtain the shoes. She tries to take the slippers when she captures Dorothy, but receives a painful shock. She then realizes that the slippers will only come off if the wearer is dead, so she decides to kill Dorothy. Before she does, however, Dorothy accidentally splashes her with a bucket of water, causing her to melt away. In the end, Glinda reveals that Dorothy can return home by simply closing her eyes, clicking the slippers' heels together three times, and repeating the sentence, "There's no place like home."

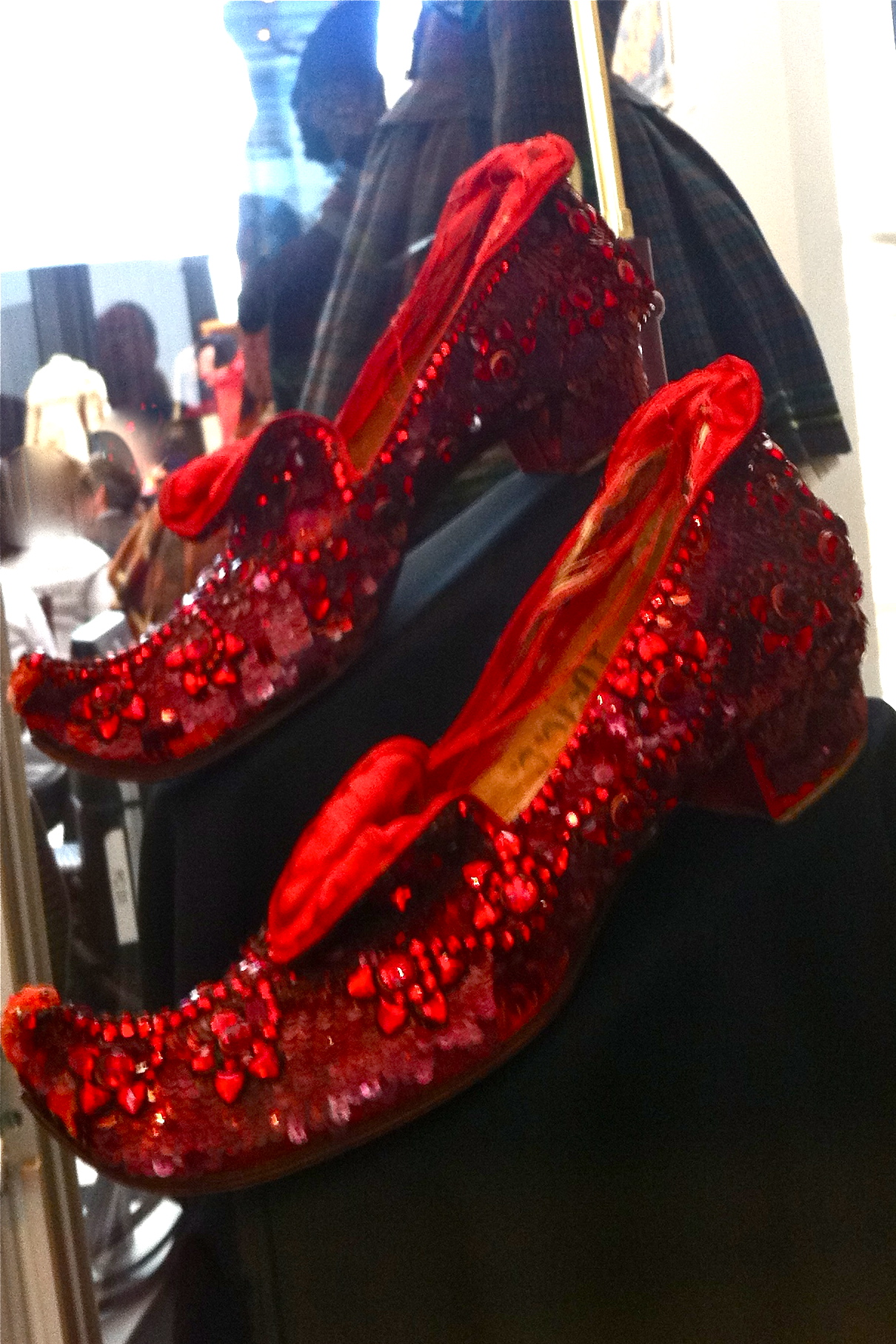
The "Arabian" ruby slippers on display at the auction of the collection of Debbie Reynolds in Beverly Hills on June 18, 2011

The slippers were designed by Gilbert Adrian, MGM's chief costume designer. Initially, two pairs were made in different styles. The so-called "Arabian test pair" was "a wildly jeweled, Arabian motif, with curling toes and heels." This pair was used in costume tests, but was rejected as unsuitable for Dorothy's farm girl image. The second design was approved with one modification. The red bugle beads used to simulate rubies proved too heavy, so they were mostly replaced with sequins, about 2,300 for each shoe.

At least six or seven pairs of the final design are believed to have been made. According to producer Mervyn LeRoy, "We must have had five or ten pairs of those shoes". The wardrobe woman who worked on the film claimed "six identical pairs" had been made. Four pairs used in the movie have been accounted for. Rhys Thomas speculates that they were likely made by Joe Napoli of the Western Costume Company, and not all at once, but as the need arose. According to Rhys Thomas in his Los Angeles Times article, "all the ruby slippers are between Size 5 and 6, varying between B and D widths."

The four surviving pairs were made from white silk pumps from the Innes Shoe Company in Los Angeles. Many movie studios used plain white silk shoes at the time because they were inexpensive and easy to dye. It is likely that most of the shoes worn by female characters in The Wizard of Oz were plain Innes shoes with varying heel heights dyed to match each costume. There is an embossed gold or silver stamp or an embroidered cloth label bearing the name of the company inside each right shoe.

The shoes were dyed red, and burgundy sequined organza overlays were attached to each shoe's upper and heel. The three-strip Technicolor film process required the sequins to be darker than most modern red sequins; bright red sequins would have looked orange on screen. Two weeks before the start of shooting, Adrian added butterfly-shaped red strap leather bows. Each of the Art Deco-inspired bows had three large, rectangular, red-glass jewels with dark red bugle beads outlined in red glass rhinestones in silver settings. The stones and beads were sewn to the bows, then to the organza-covered shoe. Three pairs of the surviving slippers had orange felt glued to their soles to deaden the sound of Garland dancing on the Yellow Brick Road.

One pair, known as "the People's Shoes," is on display at the Smithsonian Institution. However, the shoes do not belong together; their actual mates are the mismatched pair (left sized 5C, right 5BC) stolen in 2005 and recovered in 2018.

Another pair, the close-up or insert shoes, which is in the best shape of all, appears to be better made, has no orange felt on the soles, and has "#7 Judy Garland" written in the lining. According to the Library of Congress, "it is widely believed that they were used primarily for close-ups and possibly the climactic scene where Dorothy taps her heels together." Circular scuff marks on the soles support the theory that they were the ones Garland had on when she clicked her heels together (though according to some accounts it actually was one of her doubles, either Bobbie Koshay or Caren Marsh Doll, who clicked her heels in the scene). The lack of felt indicates these were likely also the shoes taken from the feet of the dead Wicked Witch of the East (since the soles are visible in the film), hence their nickname: the "Witch's Shoes".

The last known pair may have been made for Bobbie Koshay, Garland's stunt double. This is most likely the size 6B pair (owned first by Roberta Bauman, then Anthony Landini, and currently by David Elkouby) whose lining says "Double" instead of "Judy Garland". However, some believe this pair may have been the second pair created, therefore explaining the "Double" in the lining, but still worn by Garland and Koshay. Several pairs of Garland's own shoes are size 6 1/2. Garland can be seen wearing this pair in publicity photos taken after the film's primary shooting was finished in 1939.

In the film sequence where trees pelt the Scarecrow with their apples, Garland can be briefly glimpsed wearing black shoes instead of the slippers. She reportedly found the slippers so uncomfortable that she wore them only when her feet were on camera.

=== Subsequent history ===
For many years, movie studios were careless with old props, costumes, scripts, and other materials, unaware of or indifferent to their increasing value as memorabilia. Often, workers would keep them as souvenirs without permission, aware that their employers did not particularly care. One of the more notorious of these was costumer Kent Warner, who amassed a large private collection and supplemented his income with sales. He found the slippers in February or March 1970 while helping to set up a mammoth auction of MGM props and wardrobe. They had been stored and forgotten in the basement of MGM's wardrobe department. One pair became the centerpiece of the auction. Warner kept the best pair for himself, size 5B, and apparently sold the rest.

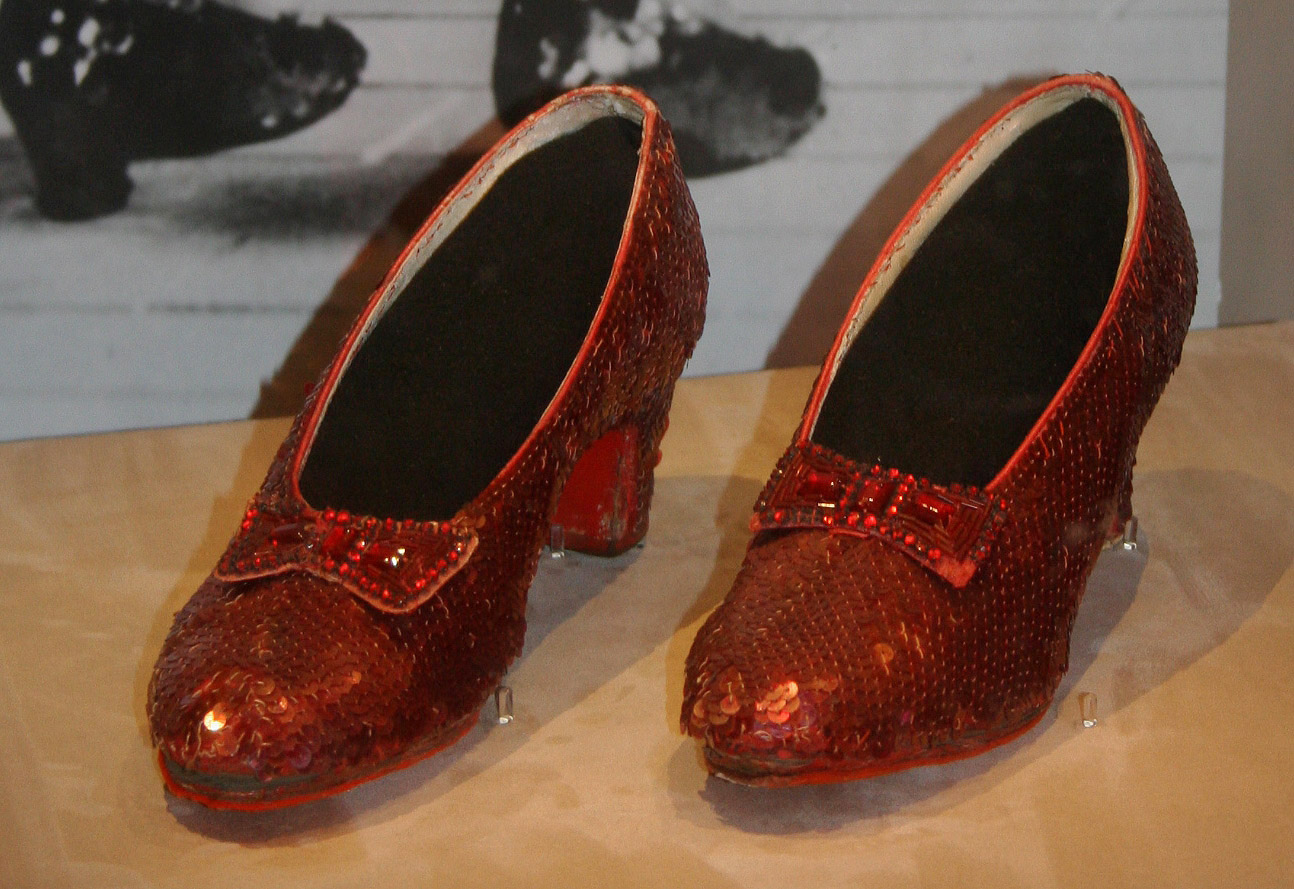
An original pair on display at the Smithsonian Institution.

The slippers in the MGM auction were bought for $15,000 by a lawyer acting for an unidentified client. This is believed to be the pair on permanent exhibition in the Popular Culture wing of the National Museum of American History at the Smithsonian Institution in Washington, D.C., though the donor insisted on anonymity. Dr. Brent Glass, the director of the museum, appeared on the January 23, 2008, The Oprah Winfrey Show with the slippers and informed Oprah Winfrey that "they were worn by Judy Garland during her dance routines on the Yellow Brick Road because there's felt on the bottom of these slippers." However, according to Rhys Thomas, all but one pair had orange felt on the soles. This pair is undergoing rapid deterioration from aging, and the museum is raising money to fund research on preservation.

Another pair was initially owned by a Tennessee woman named Roberta Bauman (1922–2009), who got them by placing second in a National Four Star Club "Name the Best Movies of 1939" contest. In 1988, auction house Christie's sold them for $150,000 plus $15,000 buyer's premium to Anthony Landini. Landini worked with The Walt Disney Company to start showing them at the Disney/MGM Studios' Florida Theme Park in the queue for The Great Movie Ride, whose facade and queue area are themed after Grauman's Chinese Theater in Los Angeles. They were visible at the ride's debut in 1989. Landini auctioned his pair of slippers, again at Christie's East, on May 24, 2000, for $666,000 (including the buyer's premium). They were sold to David Elkouby and his partners, who own memorabilia shops in Hollywood. Elkouby and Co. has yet to display the shoes.

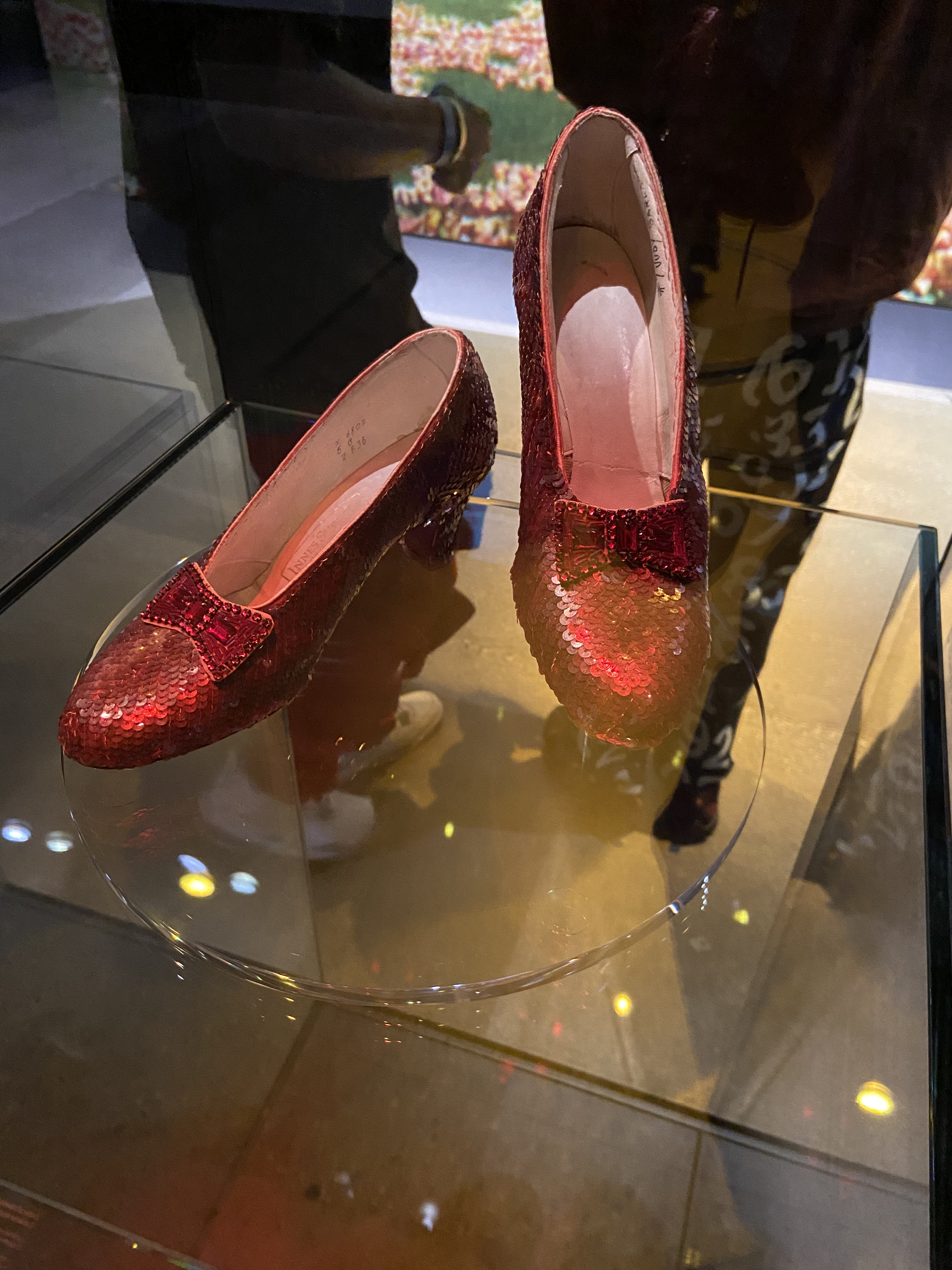
The ruby slippers at the Academy of Motion Picture Arts and Sciences in 2022.

The pair Warner kept, the "Witch's Shoes," was in the best condition. Warner sold the shoes in 1981 to an unknown buyer through Christie's East for $12,000. Two weeks after Landini bought his slippers, this pair resurfaced and was offered privately through Christie's to the under-bidder of the Bauman shoes, Philip Samuels of St. Louis, Missouri. Samuels bought them for the same price Landini had paid, $165,000. He has used his shoes to fund children's charities, and has lent them to the Smithsonian when their slippers are cleaned, repaired, or (previously) on tour. Auction house Profiles in History announced this pair would highlight its December 15–17, 2011 Icons of Hollywood auction. In an interview, Joe Maddalena, head of Profiles in History, estimated that they would go for two to three million dollars. They were offered with a starting reserve price of two million dollars on December 16, 2011, but did not sell. Actor Leonardo DiCaprio and other benefactors, including director Steven Spielberg, made it possible for the Academy of Motion Picture Arts and Sciences to acquire the pair for an undisclosed price in February 2012 for their forthcoming museum.

Kent Warner sold one pair to Michael Shaw in 1970. These were stolen from an exhibit at the Judy Garland Museum in Grand Rapids, Minnesota, on the night of August 27–28, 2005. In 2015, the Associated Press reported that an anonymous donor had offered a $1 million reward for information about the stolen slippers. On September 4, 2018, the FBI announced the stolen pair had been recovered after a 13-year search. On March 16, 2023, a federal grand jury indicted a Minnesota man on one count of theft. He pleaded guilty and was sentenced to time served in January 2024. On December 7, 2024, this pair was sold at auction for $28 million by Heritage Auctions (ultimately $32.5 million after auction house's fees are included), making it the most "valuable movie memorabilia ever sold at auction," according to Heritage Auctions. Over 800 people bid on the item, including the Judy Garland Museum, attempting to buy the slippers back from Shaw, who had regained the pair after it had been recovered by the FBI.

The very elaborate curled-toe "Arabian" pair was owned by actress and memorabilia preservationist Debbie Reynolds. She acknowledged she got them from Kent Warner. These slippers were sold for $510,000 (not including the buyer's premium) in the June 2011 auction as part of the actress's collection.

== Reproductions ==
=== Return to Oz ===
The ruby slippers play an integral role in the 1985 Walt Disney Pictures film Return to Oz, for which Disney had to obtain rights from MGM to use reproductions in the film. Unlike the originals, the hand-made British French-heeled shoes for Return to Oz were covered in hundreds of dark red crystals. The stones were soaked in sulfuric acid to remove the silver backing, and two types of glue were used to affix them to the shoes (a spray glue and an optical glue). No matter what was tried, the stones kept falling off during filming. Stagehands were specifically hired to sweep up loose "rubies" that fell off the slippers after a scene was shot. Being little girls, actresses Fairuza Balk (who played Dorothy) and Emma Ridley (who played Princess Ozma), could not keep from playing, skipping, and tapping their heels, so eventually, they were required to take off the slippers between takes. Effects were later added in post-production to give the slippers their magical glow. A simple red grosgrain ribbon, with additional stones, was used for the bows. Seven pairs were made for the filming: two pairs, size three for Ridley, three pairs (size unknown) for Balk, and two men's size 11 for the Nome King, played by Nicol Williamson.

In 1985, Walt Disney Productions gave away a pair of slippers to promote the film. They were won by a British family, who sold them to prominent Oz collector Willard Carroll in a 2001 eBay auction.

=== Western Costume Company ===
The Western Costume Company in Hollywood claims to have made Garland's original slippers. While it is likely that Western would have been contracted to make some of The Wizard of Oz's many costumes, no records of the original slippers exist to either validate or disprove their claim. Western produced the only authorized reproductions in 1989 to commemorate the movie's 50th anniversary. Hand-cast on Judy Garland's original foot mold and completely sequined and jeweled, the reproduction slippers were nearly identical to the originals. Western planned a limited edition of 500 pairs at $5000 each, but halted the project after selling only 16 pairs. One of these pairs fetched $35,000 (including buyer's premium) at a November 25, 2013, auction.

=== Other film reproductions ===
Super Mario Bros. is a 1993 science-fiction/adventure homage to The Wizard of Oz featuring red-accented 'Thwomp "Air" Stompers' that allow the wearer to fly upon clicking the heels together. An imitation pair of ruby slippers appeared in the 2002 movie The Master of Disguise. Another pair appeared in an Oz sequence in the cult comedy Kentucky Fried Movie. Reproductions were also featured in Night at the Museum: Battle of the Smithsonian, in which character Kahmunrah tosses them away after discovering the rubies are fake.

== Tribute versions ==
In honor of the fiftieth anniversary of The Wizard of Oz, the Harry Winston jewelry company created a size-four pair of slippers using "about 25 carats of diamonds and 1,500 carats of rubies". Valued at $3 million, they were reportedly the most expensive pair of shoes in the world at the time.

During the fall 2008 New York Fashion Week, the Swarovski company held a charity contest to commemorate the seventieth anniversary of the film, with nineteen designers redesigning the ruby slippers, including Gwen Stefani, Diane von Fürstenberg, and Moschino. The "Arabian" design was displayed with the designer entries.

In 2019, Ikon Design Studio released an officially licensed pair of ruby slippers. The replica slippers came in Judy Garland's size of 5B and had her name written inside the shoe. The production was limited to 250 numbered pairs worldwide, including an acrylic display case and a numbered plaque.

In 2023, a limited edition of 1500 replica pairs were created by Paragon FX Group for the 100th anniversary of Warner Bros. Warner Bros. and Turner Entertainment currently hold the copyright to the 1939 film.

== Television ==
In the 1990–1991 animated TV series The Wizard of Oz (produced by DiC Animation City), the ruby slippers' powers are significantly enhanced. Not only do they retain their movie-inspired ability to repel the Wicked Witch of the West's touch, as well as the capability to teleport their user (and an unspecified number of companions) to any location desired, but they also demonstrate numerous other attributes and capabilities as well. Among them are the ability to:

- cloud/block the view of the Witch's crystal ball, but only as long as they remain glowing
- negate, dispel, or reverse hexes or magical energy used against their wearer by the Witch
- levitate an object and control its trajectory through the air
- immediately adjust their size/shape to fit their wearer

In this series, Dorothy remains inexperienced and unfamiliar with the shoes' magic, calling upon their power only as a last resort, often resulting in a deus ex machina scenario. The Cowardly Lion and Truckle, the Wicked Witch of the West's chief Flying Monkey, also briefly wear them.

In the 2002 Charmed season 5 episode "Happily Ever After", Piper returns home using the ruby slippers after going to the Fairytale Castle to vanquish the Wicked Witch.

The slippers briefly appear in the 2012 season 4 episode "Fractures" of Warehouse 13 in the Dark Vault, seemingly having a life of their own, accompanied by a witch's cackle and a few notes of "Over the Rainbow". They are supposedly an "Artifact" – a potentially dangerous and malicious object that grants the wearer dangerous powers – since many artifacts are based on works of fact and fiction.

The season 9 episode "Slumber Party" of the series Supernatural features Dorothy and the Wicked Witch. Here portrayed as a hard-as-nails fighter, Dorothy realizes the shoes are the only thing that can kill the seemingly invincible witch. At one point, she admits she never really wore the iconic shoes, having considered it "tacky" to wear the shoes of a dead witch. Near the end of the episode, Charlie Bradbury uses the shoes to kill the Wicked Witch and foil her plot to bring her armies to Earth and take over the world.

== Books ==
The Ruby Slippers of Oz (Tale Weaver Publishing, 1989) by Rhys Thomas is a history of the famous shoes and Kent Warner's part in it.

In "At The Auction of the Ruby Slippers", a short story in Salman Rushdie's 1994 anthology East, West, various members of a destitute world attend an auction to bid for the ruby slippers of Dorothy Gale in The Wizard of Oz, in the hope their transformative powers will help them achieve personal and political ends.

According to the revisionist version of the Oz history chronicled in Gregory Maguire's 1995 novel Wicked: The Life and Times of the Wicked Witch of the West, the slippers were given to Nessarose, the future Wicked Witch of the East, by her father. They were constructed with handmade glass beads and reflected many different colors in the lighting, giving them an almost chameleon effect. After being enchanted by Elphaba's old best friend and roommate, Glinda (the Good Witch of the North), they become items of power that allow the armless and handicapped Nessarose to magically stand and walk independently without any additional support. In the musical adaptation Wicked, it is Elphaba, the Wicked Witch of the West, who enchants the shoes, giving crippled Nessarose the ability to walk without a wheelchair.

== Music ==
The progressive band Electric Light Orchestra used a frame from the 1939 film on the cover of their fourth studio album, Eldorado, released in 1974. The cover, designed by John Kehe, is a mirrored still frame of Dorothy's ruby slippers. This still was also used for the picture sleeve of "Can't Get It Out of My Head", the single release from the Eldorado album.

== Video games ==
In Wizard101, the slippers are a wearable item given after completing the sidequest "Not in Kansas Anymore". Once worn, they give +1 resistance to damage from Death spells.

In World of Warcraft, they are a pair of level 70 epic cloth shoes dropped by the Wizard of Oz-themed "opera event" in the Karazhan raid instance. The shoes function similarly to the hearthstone that all characters start with, allowing them to teleport from their current location to the inn where the hearthstone is set. The caption under the statistic lines is "There's no place like home."

The slippers are part of the twelve "Foundation Elements" in the 2015 toys-to-life video game Lego Dimensions.

== See also ==
- List of most valuable celebrity memorabilia
- List of film memorabilia
