= William Corbin =

William Corbin may refer to:

- William Corbin (author) (1916–1999), author of books for adults and children
- William E. Corbin (1869–1951), inventor of Nibroc paper towels and mayor of Berlin, New Hampshire
- William Herbert Corbin (1864–1945), American football player
