= The Moorchild =

1996 children's novel by Eloise McGraw

- Author: Eloise McGraw
- Language: English
- Publisher: Margaret K. McElderry Books
- Publication date: 1996
- Publication place: United States
- Pages: 241
- ISBN: 978-0-689-80654-4

The Moorchild is a 1996 children's novel by Eloise McGraw that centers on the life of a changeling girl. The novel draws heavily on Irish and European folklore about changelings, leprechauns, and fairies.

== Characters ==
Moql/Saaski: the protagonist, half-folk, an elfin creature, and half-human. Raised as a young elfish creature, one of the "moorfolk," she is exchanged against her will with a human child when she doesn't fit in with the other moorfolk children. She is described as "eldritch" and "freaky-odd" by the people of the village. She is not interested in the other children of the village, whom she describes as dull and primitive. Saaski has a different appearance from other villagers; she has brownish skin and pale, wild hair, and slanted, color-changing eyes.

Anwara: Saaski's adopted mother, a harassed young woman living in a small village by the moor. She often displays a kindly attitude towards Saaski, but is disheartened as the story progresses.

Yanno: the village blacksmith and Saaski's adoptive father. A huge man with the smell of iron about him, he is bemused by his daughter's oddities. He shows a gentle streak towards her and defends her from the villagers.

Tam: a lonely orphan goatherd on the moor who befriends Saaski and escapes with her to lands unknown towards the end of the book. He lives with Bruman, the drunken shepherd. He tells Saaski of "The King's Town," which the villagers don't believe in.

Old Bess: Anwara's mother, a mysterious old woman living in a hut on the outskirts of town. She is in tune with the ethereal world of which Saaski was a part. She suspects Saaski's true identity from the start, and is at first wary of the girl, but they eventually form an alliance and friendship.

== Themes ==
The Moorchild is dedicated "to all children who have ever felt different." Saaski's alienation from the people of her small village, as well as her human parents' struggle to accept and love their unusual child, even when faced with expert opinions stating otherwise, are plotlines that showcase this theme.

== Awards and nominations ==
The book was awarded the Newbery Honor in 1997. It also received an Oregon Book Award in 1997.
