= Moccasin Trail =

1952 novel by Eloise Jarvis McGraw

- First edition
- Author: Eloise Jarvis McGraw
- Language: English
- Genre: Children's Literature
- Publisher: Coward-McCann
- Publication date: 1952
- Publication place: United States
- Media type: Print

Moccasin Trail is a Newbery Honor novel by Eloise Jarvis McGraw, first published in 1952.

== Plot ==
Jim Keath hungers for adventure and to leave his home as a young boy. Without saying goodbye, he does just that, following his uncle into the wilderness where he helps him hunt and trap beaver. But when his uncle is suddenly killed, he is on his own. After an attack by a bear leaves him seriously injured, a band of Crow Indians come to his rescue, nursing him back to health. Jim lives out his adolescence among the Crows, speaking their language and living and thinking of himself as a Crow. Then, as a 19 year old young man, Jim is astonished to receive a letter from his brother, Jonathan, begging him to help his sister, brother, and himself secure land out west, since Jim is the only one of the four siblings who is of age to sign the legal documents necessary for claiming the land. As Jim tries to help, he struggles with the knowledge of his mother's death, the guilt of leaving his family 9 years ago, and who he really is, as his siblings try to convince him to give up his Indian ways and live as a family again.

== Characters ==
- James "Jim" Keath—Age 19

The main character of the book; he is a white boy with the skills and mannerisms of an Indian. He is almost always at odds with his sister Sally, who wants to get Jim to 'civilize.'

- Jonathan Keath—Age 17

The 'man' of the family after the death of the Keath parents; Jonathan, or 'Jonnie', as he is known, is simply someone who seeks better life in the Oregon territories. Serves as the 'mediator' between Sally and Jim.

- Sally Keath-Age 15

The sister of the Keath family, who fills in for the role of their mother. Is extremely distrustful of Jim for his Indian ways.

- Daniel Keath-Age 11

The youngest Keath sibling. At first he follows Jonathan around, but eventually warms up to Jim and his Indian ways, picking up most of his mannerisms and skills.
