= The Golden Goblet =

Book by Eloise Jarvis McGraw

- Author: Eloise Jarvis McGraw
- Genre: Children's Novel, Historical Fiction
- Publisher: Coward McCann, Inc.
- Publication date: 1961
- Pages: 248
- ISBN: 0-14-030335-9
- OCLC: 13064566
- LC Class: PZ7.M1696 Go 1986

The Golden Goblet is a children's historical novel by Eloise Jarvis McGraw. It was first published in 1961 and received a Newbery Honor award in 1962. The novel is set in ancient Egypt around 1400 B.C., and tells the story of a young Egyptian boy named Ranofer who tries to reveal an evil crime and reshape his life.

== Plot summary ==
Ranofer is an orphaned 12-year-old boy whose mother had died in his childbirth. Ranofer had learned many things at a goldsmith's shop with his father Thutra. Without his half brother, Gebu, he would be living on the streets. His evil half brother beats and mistreats Ranofer. Ranofer has to stay with Gebu because his father, Thutra, died when he was young. His father knew Zau, the master/best goldsmith well. When the tallies of gold sweepings do not add up, Ranofer tries to figure out why. He determines that Ibni the Babylonian porter is smuggling gold to Gebu through wineskins that Ranofer unknowingly carries home. Ranofer tries to stop this, but Gebu forces him to continue, threatening to beat again and sell him into slavery. Ranofer makes two new friends, the Ancient and Heqet, but things take a turn for the worse when Gebu moves him to his stone cutting shop to be an apprentice after Ibni is caught. Ranofer doesn't like the job as much as his dream where he is to be apprentice by Zau, the master/best goldsmith. With the help of his new friends, Ranofer discovers that someone else is stealing gold at night after getting suspicious again. After Heqet suggests they work together to spy on Gebu and his evil helpers, they meet in a thicket near the river, share food, and talk about what they have heard during midday when Ranofer gets a break from his awful job at the stonecutters' shop. Ranofer breaks into Gebu's room and discovers a golden goblet which could not have come from the area. Ranofer realizes that Gebu has been tomb robbing by the markings at the bottom which say the name of a pharaoh, Thutmose the Conqueror. Also with that evidence he realizes that no one can get as rich as Gebu was getting in one day which supports his theory. He asks the Ancient how tomb robbers are caught, and the Ancient replies, "They must be followed". Ranofer knows from Heqet's eavesdropping that Gebu will be going on another tomb robbing session during the upcoming feast, but keeps his findings to himself. Ranofer follows Gebu to the burial chamber. Meanwhile, Heqet and the Ancient have also gone to the Valley of the Kings looking for Ranofer, putting puzzle pieces together where he has gone and why. Ranofer runs out of the tomb after extinguishing the robbers' torch and one of the giant steps crumbles, trapping Gebu and his companion Wenamon. Ranofer put a boulder on top of the entrance, and then finds Heqet and the Ancient, who sit on the boulder while Ranofer returns to town. He manages to get into the palace, and tries to get an audience with the queen but is stopped by the palace guards. Qa-nefer, the queen's dwarf &"pet", believes his story although he finds Ranofer a little crazy. Ranofer finally gets an audience with the queen, and after telling her about the golden goblet with Thutmose's name on it, she decides to test his truthfulness about the tomb robbery by asking him, "What was the object leaning against the north wall of my parents' burial chamber?" Ranofer answers, "Majesty, it was your father's oaken staff," and the queen immediately sends out soldiers, who catch Gebu & Wenamon. Finally, the queen asks what Ranofer wants most in the world. "A donkey," Ranofer said, "so that I may earn a living for myself like the Ancient, be a student of Zau the Gold Master & make fine jewellery for Your Sublime Majesty." He then trots off on his magnificent new donkey and the book ends with him meeting with the Ancient and Heqet, having changed around his life circumstances.

== Historical accuracy ==
Very little is known about the lives of Egyptian artisans at the time, but some events can be traced. The grave of Thutmose the Conqueror was robbed about 200 years before the time of the novel. The tomb of Yuya and Tuya was discovered in 1905. The tomb had been penetrated, but was mostly intact. The discoverer, James Quibell, assumed that the robbers might have been disturbed in their act, giving the novel an interesting historical sense.

== Reception ==
Kirkus Reviews called it "an exhilarating story" and noted "We are given a most worthy hero in Ranofer ... This plus the vividly detailed setting make the book an excellent choice." The Golden Goblet was the central text For Los Angeles City Schools teachers who had gifted pupils in their class and is part of school study and reading programs

== Newbery Honor ==
The Golden Goblet was retroactively named a Newbery Honor book when the award for runners-up to the Newbery Medal was initiated in the year 1971.
