= The Rundelstone of Oz =

Book by Eloise Jarvis McGraw

- First edition
- Author: Eloise Jarvis McGraw
- Illustrator: Eric Shanower
- Cover artist: Eric Shanower
- Language: English
- Series: The Oz Books
- Genre: Fantasy
- Publisher: Hungry Tiger Press
- Publication date: 2001
- Publication place: United States
- Media type: Print (Hardcover)
- Pages: 224
- ISBN: 978-1-929527-04-5
- OCLC: 49241951
- LC Class: PZ7.M1696 Ru 2001

The Rundelstone of Oz is a novel by Eloise Jarvis McGraw. It is a volume in the series of fictional works about the Land of Oz, by L. Frank Baum and his successors.

The Rundelstone of Oz was originally the opening section of McGraw's The Forbidden Fountain of Oz. Extracted from that book, the Rundelstone story remained unpublished until it was included in the sixth and final issue of Oz-story Magazine, the annual periodical issued by David Maxine and Eric Shanower from 1995 to 2000. The novel was then published in a hardback edition the next year.

The Forbidden Fountain of Oz was originally intended to be illustrated by Lauren Lynn McGraw, the author's daughter and credited co-author. In Oz-story, The Rundelstone of Oz was published with Shanower's illustrations, along with Lauren McGraw's design sketches for the characters from the earlier form of the story. (Since McGraw died in 2000, the 2001 edition was published posthumously; it featured an Introduction by Lauren Lynn.)

== Synopsis ==
The Troopadours are travelling entertainers — not human ones, but living marionettes. When they reach the village of Whitherwood in the Gillikin Country, they are enchanted by a malicious magician called Slyddwyn. Most are transformed into inanimate objects — though Slyddwyn leaves the humblest member of the troupe, Pocotristi Sostenuto, free to serve as a menial servant in his castle.

(This plot device, of magically turning "people" into inanimate ornaments, reaches back to Baum's third Oz book, Ozma of Oz.)

To work his transformations, Slyddwyn uses the Rundelstone, a fist-sized rock with a "rundel" (a rhyming riddle, in this case also an enchantment) carved on it in "flarns" (runes). Puppet protagonist Poco must figure out what has happened to his companions, then obtain the Rundelstone and learn to work its magic. With the help of a young boy named Rolly, and eventually with the aid of Dorothy Gale, Princess Ozma and other familiar denizens of Oz, Poco succeeds in restoring his friends, defeating the villain, and ensuring that Good triumphs.

== See also ==
- The Adventures of Pinocchio by Carlo Collodi
