= Dick Martin (artist) =

American artist (1927–1990)

Dickinson P. Martin (June 29, 1927 – February 14, 1990) was an artist from Chicago who wrote and illustrated a number of books in and related to the Oz series.

== Career ==
Martin was an active Oz fan, serving as The International Wizard of Oz Club as president, vice-president, director, and editor of its magazine, The Baum Bugle.

Martin illustrated Merry Go Round in Oz (1963), the 40th title in the regular Oz series. Martin's illustrations received positive notice in a review in the Chicago Tribune.

He was co-author of The Oz Scrapbook (1977). A Library Journal review of The Oz Scrapbook called it "a superb production". Martin also wrote and illustrated The Ozmapolitan of Oz (1986). He designed new opening titles for the 1990s home video rerelease of His Majesty, the Scarecrow of Oz.

Prior to his Oz work, Martin illustrated two decks of playing cards for the Chicago Playing Card Collectors. The first, Fact & Fancy, was released in 1961 for the club's 10th anniversary in an edition of 600. The second, Mythological Zoo, was made in 1971 and available in two versions — monochrome (edition of 200) and colored (edition of 100).

== Selected works ==
- The Visitors from Oz (1960) (as illustrator)
- Merry Go Round in Oz (1963) (as illustrator)
- Yankee in Oz (1972) (as illustrator)
- The Enchanted Island of Oz (1976) (as illustrator)
- The Oz Scrapbook (1977) (as co-author)
- The Forbidden Fountain of Oz (1980) (as illustrator)
- The Ozmapolitan of Oz (1986) (as author and illustrator)
