= The Striped Ships =

1991 work by Eloise McGraw

- Author: Eloise McGraw
- Publication date: 1991
- Publication place: New York
- Awards: Mary Jane Carr Award for Young Readers (1992) Oregon Book Awards Award for Young Readers (1992) Phoenix Honor Award (2011)
- ISBN: 0-689-50532-9

The Striped Ships by Eloise McGraw is a historical fiction children's book, published in 1991. It follows Juliana, a thane's daughter who witnesses the arrival of William the Conqueror's fleet in England, and becomes involved in the creation of the Bayeux Tapestry. In 1992 the book won the Award for Young Readers Literature in the 1992 Oregon Book Awards, and the Mary Jane Carr Award for Young Readers. In 2011 the book was awarded an Honor Award in the Phoenix Awards.

== Plot ==
The story begins on the morning of Michaelmas Eve, 1066 in Pevensey. Juliana, the eleven-year old daughter of a Saxon thane, has escaped her embroidery session to run on the beach, when she sees a fleet of striped ships approaching. She realises at once that she is witnessing an invasion from Normandy. The Normans have already made it to her village when she returns, and she witnesses bloodshed and violence. Separated from her family, she survives several weeks in the marshes before being captured, and becoming a slave in the Norman castle at Hastings.

After some months, Juliana's younger brother Wulfric appears, and the two escape the Normans. Wulfric persuades Juliana to help him get to Canterbury so he can become a scribe as he has always planned. The pair travel north together. On their journey, they get lost in a forest and meet a friendly hermit who is unaware of the Norman invasion. They find burned villages, but then are robbed by a band of Saxons that turns out to include their older half-brother, Sweyn.

Sweyn helps them find their way to Canterbury. In Canterbury, Wulfric is able to enter the priory school while Juliana endures menial tasks and is on the verge of starving or freezing. Eventually she is able to gain employment as a thread-winder for the embroiderers and spinsters working on the Bayeux Tapestry. Over the course of several months her mother in Winchester becomes aware that Juliana and Wulfric are in Canterbury, and appears with her new Norman husband to persuade Juliana to return to Winchester with them. Sweyn is injured in battle with the Normans, and Juliana nurses him back to health, but has to lie to her mother about his whereabouts. Juliana persuades her mother that she is safe in Canterbury, and the book ends with her being promoted to embroiderer, and continuing her work on the tapestry.

== Reception ==
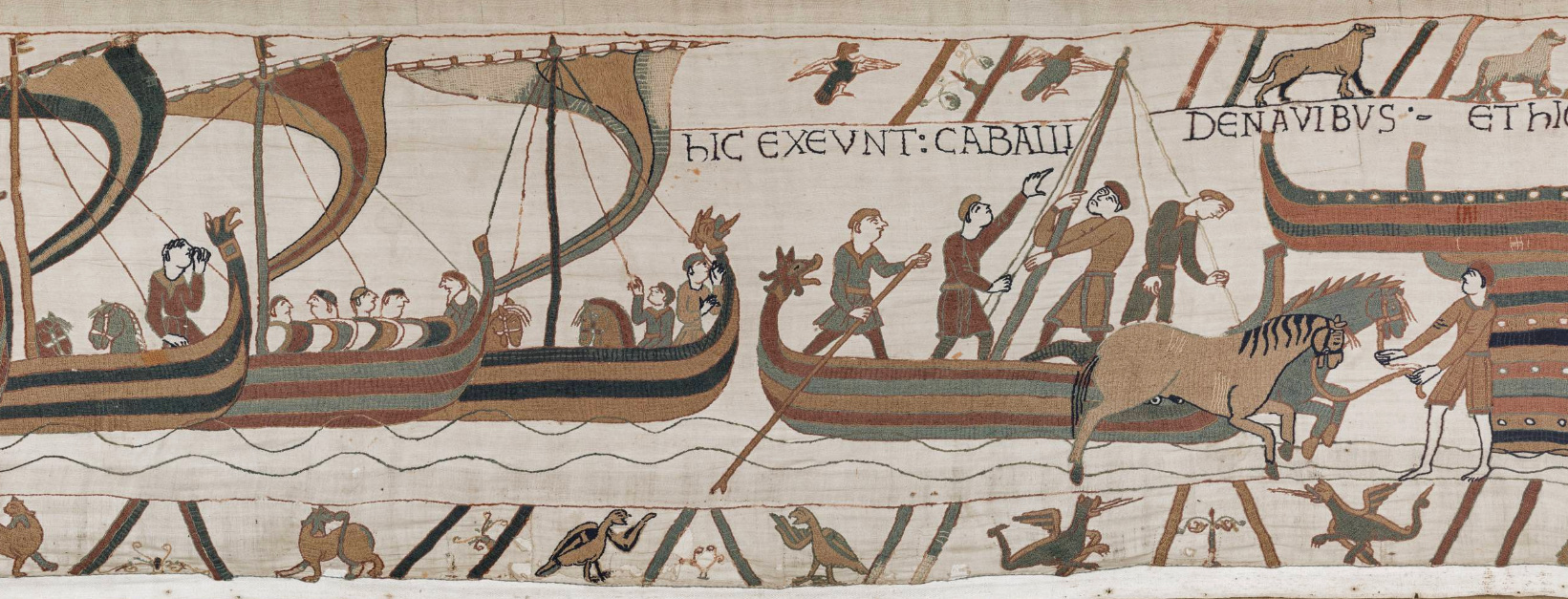
Scene from the Bayeux Tapestry depicting ships grounding and horses landing in England

The book won the Award for Young Readers Literature in the 1992 Oregon Book Awards. The same year, it was awarded the Mary Jane Carr Award for Young Readers by the Oregon Institute of Literary Arts. In 2011 the book was awarded an Honor Award in the Phoenix Awards.

The book received positive reviews, with comments focusing on the historical detail and vivid setting, for instance: "A generous quantity of historical detail enriches the story, but the focus stays on Juliana, a fiercely loyal and conscientious Saxon, and on her harrowing, eventful quest for a modus vivendi under the Norman yoke. Solid, entertaining historical fiction that will appeal to Sutcliff's readers and that also has many interesting parallels with books about WW II."

One reviewer remarked on a couple of mistakes in the historical notes, in particular a confusion between the date of the invasion and the date of the Battle of Hastings. That reviewer also noted that a more extensive glossary would have been useful, as there is little material available for young readers covering this period of English history.

McGraw admitted that she went "overboard" in her attempts to research the book, learning to embroider and recreating a panel of the tapestry herself. She related that after 200 hours of work, although she had expected a sore back, it was actually her fingertips that ached, but only after embroidering the outlines of the work.
