= List of Oz books =

The Oz books form a book series that begins with The Wonderful Wizard of Oz (1900) and relates the fictional history of the Land of Oz. Oz was created by author L. Frank Baum, who went on to write fourteen full-length Oz books. Baum styled himself as "the Royal Historian of Oz" in order to emphasize the concept that Oz is an actual place on Earth, full of magic. In his Oz books, Baum created the illusion that characters such as Dorothy and Princess Ozma relayed their adventures in Oz to Baum themselves, by means of a wireless telegraph.

After Baum's death in 1919, publisher Reilly & Lee continued to produce annual Oz books, passing on the role of Royal Historian. Ruth Plumly Thompson took up the task in 1921, and wrote nineteen Oz books. After Thompson, Reilly & Lee published seven more books in the series: three by John R. Neill, two by Jack Snow, one by Rachel Cosgrove Payes, and a final book by Eloise Jarvis McGraw and Lauren Lynn McGraw. The forty books in Reilly & Lee's Oz series are called "the Famous Forty" by fans, and are considered the canonical Oz texts.

== Books by L. Frank Baum ==
=== Oz books ===
The original Oz books by L. Frank Baum
Cover	Order	Title	Illustrator	Year	Publisher
	1	The Wonderful Wizard of Oz	W. W. Denslow	1900	George M. Hill Company
A little farm girl named Dorothy and her pet dog, Toto, get swept away into the magical Land of Oz by a Kansas cyclone. Upon her arrival, she is hailed as a sorceress; liberates a living Scarecrow; and meets a man made entirely of tin and a Cowardly Lion. But all Dorothy really wants to know is how she can return home. The ruler of Oz, the great Wizard, who resides in an Emerald City, may be the only one powerful enough to help her.
	2	The Marvelous Land of Oz	John R. Neill	1904	Reilly & Britton
A little boy, Tip, escapes from his evil guardian, the witch Mombi, with the help of a walking wooden figure with a jack-o'-lantern head named Jack Pumpkinhead (brought to life with the magic Powder of Life Tip stole from Mombi), as well as a living Sawhorse (created from the same powder). Tip ends up on an adventure with the Scarecrow and Tin Woodman to help Scarecrow recapture his throne from General Jinjur's army of girls.
	3	Ozma of Oz	John R. Neill	1907	Reilly & Britton
While traveling to Australia with her Uncle Henry, Dorothy is swept overboard with a hen named Billina. They land in Ev, a country across the desert from Oz, where they encounter the Wheelers and make a new friend, the mechanical man Tik-Tok. They meet Princess Ozma, who is in Ev to attempt to save Ev's royal family from the evil Nome King, and finally return to Oz.
	4	Dorothy and the Wizard in Oz	John R. Neill	1908	Reilly & Britton
On her way back from Australia, Dorothy visits her cousin, Zeb, in California. They are soon swallowed up by an earthquake, along with Zeb's horse Jim and Dorothy's cat Eureka. The group soon meets up with the Wizard and all travel underground back to Oz.
	5	The Road to Oz	John R. Neill	1909	Reilly & Britton
Dorothy meets the Shaggy Man, and while trying to find the road to Butterfield, they get lost on an enchanted road. As they travel they meet the rainbow's daughter, Polychrome, and a little boy, Button-Bright. They have all sorts of strange adventures on the way to Oz.
	6	The Emerald City of Oz	John R. Neill	1910	Reilly & Britton
Dorothy Gale and her Uncle Henry and Aunt Em come to live in Oz permanently. While they tour through the Quadling Country, the Nome King is tunneling beneath the desert to invade Oz. This was originally intended to be the last book in the series.
	7	The Patchwork Girl of Oz	John R. Neill	1913	Reilly & Britton
A Munchkin boy named Ojo must find a cure to free his Uncle Nunkie from a magical spell that has turned him into a statue. With the help of Scraps, a living patchwork doll, Ojo journeys through Oz to save his uncle.
	8	Tik-Tok of Oz	John R. Neill	1914	Reilly & Britton
Betsy Bobbin, a girl from Oklahoma, is shipwrecked with her mule, Hank, in the Rose Kingdom of Oz. She meets the Shaggy Man there and the two try to rescue the Shaggy Man's brother from the Nome King. This book is partly based upon Baum's stage musical, The Tik-Tok Man of Oz, which was in turn based on Ozma of Oz.
	9	The Scarecrow of Oz	John R. Neill	1915	Reilly & Britton
Cap'n Bill and Trot journey to Oz and, with the help of the Scarecrow, the former ruler of Oz, overthrow the villainous King Krewl of Jinxland. Cap'n Bill and Trot had previously appeared in two other novels by Baum, The Sea Fairies and Sky Island. Based in part upon the 1914 silent film, His Majesty, the Scarecrow of Oz. This was allegedly L. Frank Baum's personal favourite Oz book.
	10	Rinkitink in Oz	John R. Neill	1916	Reilly & Britton
Young Prince Inga of Pingaree, aided by King Rinkitink, three powerful magical pearls, and a goat, attempts to rescue Inga's parents and their subjects from marauding warriors who have laid waste to Pingaree and enslaved its people. Baum originally wrote this book as a non-Oz book which he titled King Rinkitink.
	11	The Lost Princess of Oz	John R. Neill	1917	Reilly & Britton
When Princess Ozma mysteriously disappears, four search parties are sent out, one for each of Oz's four countries. Most of the book covers Dorothy and the Wizard's efforts to find her. Meanwhile, Cayke the Cookie Chef discovers that her magic dishpan (on which she bakes her famous cookies) has been stolen. Along with the Frogman, they leave their mountain in Winkie Country to find the pan.
	12	The Tin Woodman of Oz	John R. Neill	1918	Reilly & Lee
The Tin Woodman, whose real name is Nick Chopper, sets out to find the Munchkin Girl he had courted before he became a tin man. The Tin Woodman, the Scarecrow and their friend Woot the Wanderer have numerous adventures on this quest. They are transformed into animals by a hostile giantess, and they meet another live tin man, Captain Fyter, as well as a Frankenstein monster-like creature, Chopfyt, made from their combined fleshly parts by the tinsmith Ku-Klip.
	13	The Magic of Oz	John R. Neill	1919	Reilly & Lee
Ruggedo, former Nome King, tries to conquer Oz again with the help of a Munchkin boy, Kiki Aru. Meanwhile, it is also Ozma's birthday, and all of Oz's citizens are searching for the most unusual present for the little princess. This was published a month after Baum's death.
	14	Glinda of Oz	John R. Neill	1920	Reilly & Lee
Dorothy, Ozma and Glinda try to stop a war in the Gillikin Country. This was Baum's last Oz book, and it was published posthumously.

=== Story collections and other works ===
Cover	Title	Author	Illustrator	Year	Publisher
	Queer Visitors from the Marvelous Land of Oz	L. Frank Baum	Walt McDougal	1904–1905	Reilly & Lee (1960)
Newspaper comic/column chronicling the misadventures of the Scarecrow, the Tin Woodman, the Woggle-Bug, Jack Pumpkinhead, the Sawhorse, and the Gump in the United States. The series was written to promote The Marvelous Land of Oz. This was republished more than once in book form, first in a heavily revised edition by Jean Kellogg as The Visitors from Oz and later as The Third Book of Oz by Buckethead Enterprises of Oz, which was censored to remove the outdated ethnic stereotyping. The Third Book of Oz also includes "The Woggle-Bug Book" (see below) and is illustrated by Eric Shanower. Hungry Tiger Press was not censored as the Buckethead edition was, but used The Visitors from Oz as the title like the Kellogg adaptation. The complete series can be read online.
	The Woggle-Bug Book: The Strange Adventure of the Woggle-Bug	L. Frank Baum	Ike Morgan	1905	Reilly & Britton
Further adventures of the Woggle-Bug in the United States after he gets separated from the others. The text is included in The Third Book of Oz and the Hungry Tiger Press The Visitors from Oz. The book can be read online.
	Little Wizard Stories of Oz	L. Frank Baum	John R. Neill	1913	Reilly & Britton
Six short stories about the Oz characters, originally written to help re-launch the Oz series in 1913. Full text can be found online.

In addition to the canonical Oz books, several of Baum's works that are not Oz stories are nevertheless nominally set in the same fictional universe as the Oz books, and include several character crossovers. These are: Dot and Tot of Merryland (1901), The Life and Adventures of Santa Claus (1902), The Magical Monarch of Mo (1903), The Enchanted Island of Yew (1903), Queen Zixi of Ix (1905), John Dough and the Cherub (1906), The Sea Fairies (1911) and Sky Island (1912).

== The rest of the "Famous Forty" ==
Following Baum's death, publisher Reilly & Lee continued publishing annual Oz books, selecting new Royal Historians to record the latest Oz doings. These books, together with Baum's original fourteen novels, form the "Famous Forty", and are considered the canonical books of the series.

Ruth Plumly Thompson's style was markedly different from Baum's. Her tales harked back to more traditional fairy tales. She often included a small kingdom, with a prince or princess who saves his or her kingdom and regains the throne or saves Oz from invasion.

=== Books by Ruth Plumly Thompson ===
By Ruth Plumly Thompson
Order	Title	Illustrator	Year	Publisher
15	The Royal Book of Oz	John R. Neill	1921	Reilly & Lee
The Scarecrow, going on a quest to find his family tree, slides down a magic bean-pole and discovers he is actually the Emperor of the mysterious underground Silver Islands. When Dorothy discovers him missing, she sets out to find him, meeting the knight, Sir Hokus of Pokes, along the way. Although Baum was credited as the author, it was written entirely by Thompson.
16	Kabumpo in Oz	John R. Neill	1922	Reilly & Lee
During Prince Pompadore of Pumperdink's birthday celebration a magic scroll is found inside his birthday cake. It warns him that if he does not wed a "proper princess" within seven days, his entire kingdom will disappear. The prince, along with the old, wise elephant Kabumpo, the Elegant Elephant, sets off on an adventure to the Emerald City and along the way meet up with Peg Amy, a living wooden doll, and Wag, a giant rabbit. Meanwhile, Ruggedo the Gnome King turns himself into a giant while tunneling under the Emerald City, gets Ozma's palace stuck on his crown, and runs off with it.
17	The Cowardly Lion of Oz	John R. Neill	1923	Reilly & Lee
The tyrant Mustafa of Mudge, who has a large collection of captive lions, uses magic to compel an American circus clown, Notta Bit More, and orphan Bobbie Downs, or Bob Up, to capture the Cowardly Lion for his collection. At the same time, the Cowardly Lion finds that the courage he received from the Wizard in the first book of the series has worn off and that he is cowardly again, and he sets out to find a very brave man, intending to obtain that man's courage and become brave again, by eating him.
18	Grampa in Oz	John R. Neill	1924	Reilly & Lee
Prince Tatters of Ragbag and Grampa, a former soldier, set out to search for King Fumbo's lost head and a fortune to save the kingdom. Meanwhile, in Perhaps City in the Maybe Mountains the Princess Pretty Good disappears after the prophet Abrog foresees her marrying a monster if she does not marry in four days.
19	The Lost King of Oz	John R. Neill	1925	Reilly & Lee
Old Mombi (from The Marvelous Land of Oz) is now a cook in the land of Kimbaloo, and one day comes across Pajuka, the former prime minister of Oz, whom she enchanted into a goose years before. She sets out to find Princess Ozma's lost father Pastoria, the former king of Oz, whom she had also enchanted. Meanwhile, Dorothy is accidentally transported to Hollywood, where she meets Humpy, a live stunt dummy, whom she brings back to Oz.
20	The Hungry Tiger of Oz	John R. Neill	1926	Reilly & Lee
The Hungry Tiger is transported to Rash, the Red Kingdom in Ev, where he is made guard of the prison, where he discovers Betsy Bobbin, Carter Green, the Vegetable Man, and the Scarlet Prince Reddy of Rash as prisoners. They escape, and have many adventures on the way back to Oz.
21	The Gnome King of Oz	John R. Neill	1927	Reilly & Lee
Peter Brown, an American boy, finds his way to the Island of Ruggedo, the wicked Gnome King. The two escape to Oz, which the Gnome King plans to conquer. Meanwhile, Scraps, the Patchwork Girl, is kidnapped by the Quilties and made their queen.
22	The Giant Horse of Oz	John R. Neill	1928	Reilly & Lee
Many years ago, before Dorothy came to Oz, the royal family of the Munchkins were kidnapped and imprisoned on the mysterious Ozure Islands by the witch Mombi. Quiberon, an evil monster created by Mombi, guards them, but now wants a mortal maiden. Prince Philador of the Ozure Islands sets out to save them, and meets Tattypoo, the Good Witch of the North (not seen since a cameo in The Road to Oz).
23	Jack Pumpkinhead of Oz	John R. Neill	1929	Reilly & Lee
Remembering his previous visit to Oz, Peter (from The Gnome King of Oz) finds himself in Jack Pumpkinhead's yard. The two set off for the Emerald City, but take a wrong turn and end up in the Quadling Country. They meet Belfaygor of Bourne, with his beard cursed to rapid growth, and Snif the Iffin, a griffin who has lost his "grr." Together, the group stymies the Red Baron of Baffleburg's plot to conquer Oz and marry Ozma.
24	The Yellow Knight of Oz	John R. Neill	1930	Reilly & Lee
Sir Hokus of Pokes grows bored with life in the Emerald City, and he and the Comfortable Camel set out for some adventure. Meanwhile, a boy named Speedy blasts his way to Oz in a homemade rocket ship, where he finds himself in the underground kingdom of Subterranea. Sir Hokus rescues the Princess Marygolden, and discovers the secret of his own past.
25	Pirates in Oz	John R. Neill	1931	Reilly & Lee
The former Gnome King, now a mute outcast wandering peddler, regains his ability to speak, becomes King of the small kingdom of Menankypoo, enlists a gang of pirates and a clever magician, and attempts once again to conquer the land of Oz. Meanwhile, Peter returns to Oz for a third time, and in the company of a deposed king and a pirate chief whose pirates have abandoned him for being soft-hearted, sails around the Nonestic Ocean visiting small islands. They are joined by Pigasus the flying pig.
26	The Purple Prince of Oz	John R. Neill	1932	Reilly & Lee
When the royal family of Pumperdink is enchanted by an evil fairy, Kabumpo and young Prince Randy of Regalia (traveling incognito) escape, and ultimately rescue the kingdom with the help of Red Jinn. In the process, Randy accomplishes the tasks which the Kingdom of Regalia requires of its princes as proof of manhood and strong character.
27	Ojo in Oz	John R. Neill	1933	Reilly & Lee
Ojo (from The Patchwork Girl of Oz) is captured by Gypsies, who plan to exchange him for a large bounty which a mysterious magician is offering to anyone who can capture and deliver him. He escapes with fellow captive Snufferbux the dancing bear, and falls in with Realbad, the leader of a group of bandits. Together they discover X-Pando, the flexible man, free Crystal City from the Blue Dragon, and visit Unicorners, a community of Unicorns. Searching for Ojo, Dorothy and Scraps visit Dicksey Land, as well as many other strange lands.
28	Speedy in Oz	John R. Neill	1934	Reilly & Lee
Speedy (from The Yellow Knight of Oz) returns for another adventure. While inspecting a dinosaur skeleton, Speedy is blown by a geyser into the air. The skeleton comes magically to life and becomes Terrybubble, a live (although fleshless) dinosaur. Terrybubble and Speedy land on Umbrella Island, a magic floating island, which has been captured by a giant.
29	The Wishing Horse of Oz	John R. Neill	1935	Reilly & Lee
This Oz mystery starts in Skampavia where King Skamperoo wishes for a horse using enchanted emerald necklaces. When Chalk, the Wishing Horse of Oz, falls from the sky, Skamperoo decides the emeralds must be from the Emerald City, and decides to conquer all of Oz.
30	Captain Salt in Oz	John R. Neill	1936	Reilly & Lee
Captain Salt (from Pirates in Oz) sails the Nonestic Ocean and discovers Ozamaland, a legendary land of flying animals, as well as the famous White City of Om and many other places.
31	Handy Mandy in Oz	John R. Neill	1937	Reilly & Lee
Mandy from Mt. Mern is a Mernite, a race of seven-handed people. One day, while Mandy is trying to gather her goats, the rock she is standing on is blown into the air and into Oz. She lands in Keretaria in the Munchkin Country and meets Nox the white Royal Ox. This is also the last appearance of Ruggedo, the Gnome King.
32	The Silver Princess in Oz	John R. Neill	1938	Reilly & Lee
King Randy of Regalia sets off for adventure with his old friend, the Elegant Elephant Kabumpo, to visit their friend Jinnicky the Red Jinn in Ev. Before long, they meet Planetty, the lovely Princess from Anuther Planet, and her fire-breathing Thundercolt, Thun, and set off on more adventures.
33	Ozoplaning with the Wizard of Oz	John R. Neill	1939	Reilly & Lee
The Wizard decides to create ozoplanes for his friends which can fly into the stratosphere. The Wizard, Dorothy, the Cowardly Lion and the Scarecrow take one ozoplane, called the Ozpril, and go to the Red Top Mountains. The other group: Tin Woodman, Jellia Jamb and the Soldier with the Green Whiskers take the Oztober to the sky city of Stratovania. The phrase "The Wizard of Oz" was included in the title to coincide with the 1939 release of the film The Wizard of Oz.

Thompson wrote two additional novels in the 1970s which are not included in the "Famous Forty": Yankee in Oz (1972) and The Enchanted Island of Oz (1976), both published by the International Wizard of Oz Club.

=== Books by John R. Neill ===
Illustrator John R. Neill's vision of Oz is more manic than Thompson or Baum's. Houses often get up and do battle, and everything can be alive. His entries take Oz's color scheme (blue for Munchkin Country, red for Quadling Country, etc.) to an extreme, extending it to sky and skin colors.

By John R. Neill
Order	Title	Illustrator	Year	Publisher
34	The Wonder City of Oz	John R. Neill	1940	Reilly & Lee
Jenny Jump captures a leprechaun and forces him to make her into a fairy, but he only does half the job before escaping. Jenny then jumps to Oz using her half-fairy gifts. She soon sets up a fashionable Style Shop with a magic turnstile which will give anyone high style and challenges Ozma to an ozlection to become ruler of the Land of Oz.
35	The Scalawagons of Oz	John R. Neill	1941	Reilly & Lee
The Wizard creates Scalawagons, intelligent cars that can also fly. He makes Tik-Tok superintendent of the Scalawagons Factory, but the mechanical man runs down. Bell Snickle, a mysterious creature, takes advantage of Tik-Tok's condition by filling the scalawagons with "flabber-gas" and the Wizard nearly loses his scalawagons.
36	Lucky Bucky in Oz	John R. Neill	1942	Reilly & Lee
Bucky is aboard a tugboat in New York Harbor when the boiler blows up. He is soon blown into the Nonestic Ocean where he meets Davy Jones, a wooden whale. The pair travel to the Emerald City, and have many watery adventures along the way.

=== Books by Jack Snow ===
Jack Snow was a Baum scholar, and even offered to take over the series at age twelve when Baum died. Snow's books lack any characters created by Thompson or Neill, although he did create his own.

By Jack Snow
Order	Title	Illustrator	Year	Publisher
37	The Magical Mimics in Oz	Frank Kramer	1946	Reilly & Lee
Ozma and Glinda go to meet with the Fairy Queen Lurline in the Forest of Burzee and leave Dorothy in charge of Oz. During Ozma's absence, the evil Mimics escape their imprisonment on Mount Illuso and use their magic to take the form of others and attempt to conquer Oz.
38	The Shaggy Man of Oz	Frank Kramer	1949	Reilly & Lee
It is discovered that the love magnet, which was owned by the Shaggy Man (from The Road to Oz), has broken, and only its creator, the evil Conjo, can fix it. Meanwhile, Twink and Tom are pulled through their television to the Isle of Conjo in the Nonestic Ocean along with the wooden clown Twiffle. Soon the Shaggy Man arrives and saves them from Conjo.

=== Book by Rachel Cosgrove Payes ===
By Rachel Cosgrove Payes
Order	Title	Illustrator	Year	Publisher
39	The Hidden Valley of Oz	Dirk Gringhuis	1951	Reilly & Lee
Jam, a boy from Ohio, builds a kite and attaches it to a crate and sets off to Oz with his two guinea pigs, Pinny and Gig, and a lab rat named Percy. Once in Oz, Jam realizes his pets can talk. He lands in the Hidden Valley and becomes a prisoner, but they escape and set out on adventures with the Tin Woodman.

=== Book by Eloise Jarvis McGraw and Lauren Lynn McGraw ===
By Eloise Jarvis McGraw and Lauren Lynn McGraw
Order	Title	Illustrator	Year	Publisher
40	Merry Go Round in Oz	Dick Martin	1963	Reilly & Lee
Robin Brown from the United States rides a magic merry-go-round horse named Merry Go Round to Oz. Upon landing, Robin must help find the missing magic Circlets of Halidom.

== Additional books ==
=== Books published by the International Wizard of Oz Club ===
Additional books published by the International Wizard of Oz Club
Title	Writer	Illustrator	Year	Publisher
Yankee in Oz	Ruth Plumly Thompson	Dick Martin	1972	International Wizard of Oz Club
Tompy, a drummer boy from the United States and Yankee, an Air Force dog meet the Red Jinn of Ev and together defeat an evil giant who is threatening both America and Oz. Originally written in 1954, it was published by the Club in 1972 with Reilly & Lee's authorization.
The Enchanted Island of Oz	Ruth Plumly Thompson	Dick Martin	1976	International Wizard of Oz Club
David B. Perry and his talking camel Humpty Bumpty find themselves on Kapurta, an island stranded in the sky. David must supply the magic to move the island and visit the Emerald City in time for the Cowardly Lion's birthday party.
The Forbidden Fountain of Oz	Eloise Jarvis McGraw and Lauren McGraw Wagner	Dick Martin	1980	International Wizard of Oz Club
Ozma takes a sip from limeade made from the Forbidden Fountain, forgets who she is and disappears. As the androgynous Poppy, she befriends reformed unsuccessful bandit Tobias Bridlecull, Jr. and a white lamb named Lambert. Kabumpo sets out to rescue her, but he believes Toby to be a kidnapper, so she does not want to be saved.
The Ozmapolitan of Oz	Dick Martin	Dick Martin	1986	The International Wizard of Oz Club
Septimius Septentrion is three weeks into a job as a printer at the Ozmapolitan in the Emerald City of Oz. A chance meeting with Princess Dorothy leads to a plan to drum up news to promote the sleepy Ozite newspaper. Accompanied by a mifket named Jinx and Dorothy's cat Eureka, "Tim" and Dorothy embark on a cross-country trip through the Winkie Country. The plan is to meet the Scarecrow at his corncob-shaped residence; but the plan quickly goes awry. The party encounter a fortune-teller and receive cryptic gingerbread-fortune-cookie predictions: Dorothy's is "A Fat Chance," Tim's is "A Blue Moon," and Jinx's is "A Silent Melody." The Expeditioneers, as they call themselves, learn the meanings of these fortunes as they progress through an Art Colony, a Game Preserve, and a long and complex subterranean journey.
The Wicked Witch of Oz	Rachel Cosgrove Payes	Eric Shanower	1993	International Wizard of Oz Club
Singra, the Wicked Witch of the South, awakens after a 100-year nap and decides to make up for all the wickedness she missed out on. Dorothy and friends must try and stop her before she destroys the Emerald City.
The Hidden Prince of Oz	Gina Wickwar	Anna-Maria Cool	2000	International Wizard of Oz Club
Published in celebration of the hundredth anniversary of L. Frank Baum's The Wonderful Wizard of Oz. When the Glass Cat attends the dedication of Silica Valley's Great Glass-works, she doesn't know she's about to find her roots and be wished smack dab into the middle of the 101-year-old mystery of the Hidden Prince of Oz.
Toto of Oz	Gina Wickwar	Anna-Maria Cool	2006	International Wizard of Oz Club
Toto sets out for the deep, dark Gillikin forests to find the beasts who stole his growl. Eventually he meets an aristocratic guinea pig, the poet Sonny, a plaid Hoot Owl, and two visitors from Kentucky. Joining forces, the adventurers soon realize that some mysterious magic is the cause of their misfortunes and the key to unraveling the secret of strange disappearances.

=== Books by earlier writers and illustrators ===
Additional books by earlier writers and illustrators
Title	Writer	Illustrator	Year	Publisher
Who's Who in Oz	Jack Snow	John R. Neill, Frank Kramer, and Dirk Gringhuis	1954	Reilly & Lee
A guide to characters from the first 39 Oz books.
The Giant Garden of Oz	Eric Shanower	Eric Shanower	1993	Books of Wonder
Uncle Henry and Aunt Em finally get a farm of their own, but find themselves in trouble when their produce becomes giant.
The Runaway in Oz	John R. Neill	Eric Shanower	1995	Books of Wonder
Originally written in 1943, Neill died before he could edit or illustrate the book. Scraps the Patchwork Girl runs away after causing trouble in Oz.
Paradox in Oz	Edward Einhorn	Eric Shanower	1999	Hungry Tiger Press
Ozma, the lovely girl ruler of Oz, must find a way to restore the enchantment that keeps her people young. A lovable but puzzling Parrot-Ox named Tempus carries Ozma back through time to seek the source of the aging enchantment.
The Rundelstone of Oz	Eloise McGraw	Eric Shanower	2001	Hungry Tiger Press
The Troopadours are traveling entertainers. When they reach the village of Whitherwood in the Gillikin Country, they are enchanted by a malicious magician called Slyddwyn.
The Living House of Oz	Edward Einhorn	Eric Shanower	2005	Hungry Tiger Press
When Buddy's mother is arrested for secretly practicing magic, he sets out to rescue her from the Emerald City of Oz. Aided by unlikely friends like a living hat stand, Buddy's journey leads him to confront the Wizard of Oz and Glinda the Good.

=== Books recognized by L. Frank Baum's Family Trust ===
Additional books recognized by L. Frank Baum's Family Trust
Title	Writer	Illustrator	Year	Publisher
The Emerald Wand of Oz	Sherwood Smith	William Stout	2005	HarperCollins
Two relatives of Dorothy Gale, Emma and Dory, find themselves in Oz just as Bastinda, a new Wicked Witch of the West, threatens the citizens of Oz. The first of three new books authorized by the Baum Family Trust.
Trouble Under Oz	Sherwood Smith	William Stout	2006	HarperCollins
Dory travels to Oz in answer to a summons from Princess Ozma, who asks Dori to travel with Prince Inga to the Nome Kingdom, where they will aid Prince Rik to take control of the throne and avoid a war.
Sky Pyrates Over Oz	Sherwood Smith	Kim McFarland	2014	Lulu.com
Dory and Emma, along with Scraps and Polychrome, travel through the skies over Oz. Self-published at Lulu.com to complete the planned trilogy.

== Short stories ==
=== Stories by L. Frank Baum ===
Title	Year	Collected in	Publisher
"The Cowardly Lion and the Hungry Tiger"	1913	Little Wizard Stories of Oz	Reilly & Britton
The Cowardly Lion and the Hungry Tiger have grown bored with their guard duty. The Lion wants to attack a man and the Tiger longs to satisfy his hunger.
"Little Dorothy and Toto"	1913	Little Wizard Stories of Oz	Reilly & Britton
Dorothy and Toto are walking though a wild part of Oz, when they meet a tiny man who suddenly transforms into a giant.
"Tiktok and the Nome King"	1913	Little Wizard Stories of Oz	Reilly & Britton
Tik-Tok travels from Oz to the Nome Kingdom in search of replacements for his worn parts.
"Ozma and the Little Wizard"	1913	Little Wizard Stories of Oz	Reilly & Britton
Princess Ozma takes the Wizard on an inspection tour of her kingdom. She wants to know if any of her subjects are discontented.
"Jack Pumpkinhead and the Sawhorse"	1913	Little Wizard Stories of Oz	Reilly & Britton
Two small children have gotten lost in a forest in the far west of Oz. Princess Ozma sends Jack Pumpkinhead and the Sawhorse to rescue them.
"The Scarecrow and the Tin Woodman"	1913	Little Wizard Stories of Oz	Reilly & Britton
The Scarecrow and Tin Woodman go boating in the Scarecrow's corncob-shaped boat.
"The Littlest Giant"	1917		International Wizard of Oz Club
A violent tale about a magic dart, nominally set in the Gillikin Country but otherwise making no reference to Oz. First published in 1972, illustrated by Bill Eubank.

=== Stories by other writers of the "Famous Forty" ===
Title	Author	Year	Collected in	Publisher
"The Enchanted Tree of Oz"	Ruth Plumly Thompson	1927	The Best of the Baum Bugle (1965-1966)	International Wizard of Oz Club
Dorothy, the Scarecrow, the Tin Woodman, and the Cowardly Lion find a strange fruit. Part of a radio-show contest promotion. Deliberately unfinished.
"A Murder in Oz"	Jack Snow	1958	The Best of the Baum Bugle (1957-1961)	International Wizard of Oz Club
A short story in which Tip takes his life back from Ozma, and both are ultimately restored as twin siblings.
"The Crystal People"	Jack Snow	1967	The Best of the Baum Bugle (1967-1969)	International Wizard of Oz Club
While traveling by boat, the Shaggy Man and others find a cave entrance. A deleted chapter from The Shaggy Man of Oz.
"Percy and the Shrinking Violet"	Rachel Cosgrove Payes	1995		Hungry Tiger Press
Violetta, a "mighty sorceress", rules her own little island in the Gillikin Country. Wanting more power, she sends Princess Ozma a pot of enchanted shrinking violets.
"Spots in Oz"	Rachel Cosgrove Payes	1997		Hungry Tiger Press
In a dispute over their birthday presents, Taffy decides to sabotage her brother Fudge's experiments with his new chemistry set.
"Rocket Trip to Oz"	Rachel Cosgrove Payes	2000		Hungry Tiger Press
Jam travels to Oz by rocket. Original opening chapter from The Hidden Valley of Oz.

== Alternative Oz books ==
Below are some books that deal with alternate versions of Oz, which do not follow the Oz canon originally established by L. Frank Baum.

=== Books by Gregory Maguire ===
American novelist Gregory Maguire explored Oz themes in The Wicked Years series between 1995 and 2011, then extended that work with his Another Day series starting in 2021.

Title	Year	Notes
Wicked	1995	It is a parallel novel written by Maguire and illustrated by Douglas Smith. Based upon the writings of L. Frank Baum, it is a revisionist look at the land and characters of Oz, drawing primarily from Baum's 1900 novel The Wonderful Wizard of Oz and the 1939 film The Wizard of Oz. The novel was adapted to a Broadway musical in 2003, and a two-part film released in 2024 & 2025.
Son of a Witch	2005	A sequel to Wicked, focusing on Elphaba's son Liir.
A Lion Among Men	2008	The third book in "The Wicked Years", telling the life story of the Cowardly Lion (given the name "Brrr" by Maguire).
Out of Oz	2011	The fourth and final volume in "The Wicked Years", focusing on the life of Rain, daughter of Liir and granddaughter of Elphaba. The story also includes Dorothy's return to Oz (and trial for the deaths of the Wicked Witches of the East and West), as well as the appearance of Tip and Mombi (here spelled "Mombey") from The Marvelous Land of Oz.
Tales Told in Oz	2012	A collection of five short stories exploring the folklore of Oz in "The Wicked Years."
The Brides of Maracoor	2021	The first volume in the series "Another Day", set after "The Wicked Years" and centered on Rain, Elphaba's granddaughter.
The Oracle of Maracoor	2022	The second volume of "Another Day".
The Witch of Maracoor	2023	The third and final volume of "Another Day".
Elphie: A Wicked Childhood	2025	A prequel to "The Wicked Years" centered on Elphaba.
Galinda: A Charmed Childhood	2026	A prequel to "The Wicked Years" centered on Glinda.

=== Books by Alexander Volkov ===
Alexander Volkov was a Russian novelist who published his own series of Oz novels called the Magic Land books, for readers in Soviet Russia, China and East Germany. His first book, published in 1939, was a translation and adaptation of Baum's The Wonderful Wizard of Oz, but the further books that he wrote in the 1960s and 70s were entirely Volkov's invention.

Title	Year	Notes
The Wizard of the Emerald City	1939, 1959	Volkov's original adaptation of The Wonderful Wizard of Oz. Ellie, 9, and her puppy Totoshka are carried in a hurricane to the Magic Land. After the first shock of the beauty of the land and Totoshka's sudden gift of wise speech, they meet the Fairy of the Yellow Land, Villina, who tells them that she has allowed their house to be taken by the wind to land on the head of Gingema, the Wicked Witch of the Blue Land, and kill her. Now Ellie is called "The Fairy of the Killing House" and is worshipped by the people around. Villina tells Ellie to follow the Yellow Brick Road to find Goodwin, the Great and the Horrible, the ruler of the Magic Land, who lives in the Emerald City. He is supposed to bring Ellie back home to her parents if she fulfills the greatest wishes of three creatures that she will meet on the way. They set off, Ellie wearing the silver shoes that Totoshka has found in Gingema's house. They meet Strashila the scarecrow, who dreams of having a brain, The Iron Woodman, who dreams of a heart, and the Cowardly Lion, who dreams about courage. This novel is nearly the same as the original, with a few changes and additions.
Urfin Dzhus and His Wooden Soldiers	1963	The first of Volkov's sequels, all of which have nearly nothing to do with Baum's. In this one, set one year after the events in the first novel, Urfin Dzhus, a former servant of Gingema, discovers a magical powder that brings things to life. He then creates an army of wooden soldiers and sets off to conquer the Magic Land. On her farm in Kansas, Ellie meets a crow bearing a pictured message: Strashila and The Iron Woodman behind bars. Ellie (with Totoshka) and her uncle, the wooden-legged seaman Charlie Black, set off through the desert and the mountains to help their friends.
Seven Kings of the Underground	1964	Trapped in a huge cave after a collapse, Ellie, now 11, Totoshka and Ellie's cousin Fred (13) are forced to move further into the cave. They end up in the underground of the Magic Land, in the Land of the Seven Kings of the Underground, which is currently caught up in a serious political crisis. The people recognize Ellie as the Fairy of the Killing House and keep her hostage, forcing her to use her magical powers to restore the Magical Spring of Sleepy Water that keeps the order in the country. It is up to Fred now to find a way out to seek help from Ellie's friends.
The Fiery God of the Marrans	1968	Urfin Dzhus deceives the backward marrans (jumpers), who until then did not know how to control fire, with the help of the injured eagle Karfax, whom he nursed back to health, and the lighter of the one-legged sailor Charlie Black. He persuaded them to wage war against the winkers and the Emerald City. With the help of Ellie's sister Ann, her boyfriend Tim O'Kelli, Arthur, a grandson of the dog Toto and two mechanical ponies and a grandiose volleyball game, the heroes succeed in defeating Urfin this time as well.
The Yellow Fog	1970	A giant witch named Arachna wakes up after a 5,000 years' sleep. She wishes to rule the Magic Land, but seeing that the people would not surrender, sends on them an eerie Yellow Fog that threatens to bring eternal winter and poison all the people, eventually causing mass death and destruction. The people of the Magic Land Once seal rooms to hide inside and use the leaves of a certain tree as gas masks, but this cannot last forever. Annie, Ellie's younger sister (8), her friend Tim (9), and Artoshka, Totoshka's grandson, accompanied by Charlie Black, rush to the rescue. Charlie builds a giant piloted robot who defeats the witch.
The Secret of the Abandoned Castle	1976, 1982	This time the people of the Magic Land have to deal with an alien invasion. The inseparable Annie and Tim, now 12 and 13, along with Fred the engineer, arrive to help their friends. They discover that the aliens are not united: some of them, the Arzaks, are enslaved to the Menvits through their hypnotic eyes. The guests from the Outer World discover that the Magic Land may hold the key to the Arzaks' freedom.

=== Books by the Baum family ===
Title	Writer	Year	Notes
The Laughing Dragon of Oz	Frank Joslyn Baum	1934	A "Big Little Book" written by Baum's eldest son (credited as "Frank Baum") and published by Whitman Publishing. It has none of the characters from the official Oz books, though briefly mentions the Wizard. Whitman allowed it to go out of print after a lawsuit threat from Reilly & Lee.
The Dinamonster of Oz	Kenneth Gage Baum	1941/1991	Written by Baum's youngest son in 1941. Published in 1991.
Dorothy of Oz	Roger S. Baum	1989	Dorothy and Toto return to the Land of Oz when it is under attack by a Jester using the wand of the Wicked Witch of the West. The 2014 film Legends of Oz: Dorothy's Return was partly based on it.
The Rewolf of Oz	Roger S. Baum	1990	
The SillyOzbuls of Oz	Roger S. Baum	1991	The first book in a trilogy featuring the SillyOzbuls, creatures who look like they're made of balls of pink fluff.
The SillyOzbul of Oz and Toto	Roger S. Baum	1992	
The SillyOzbul of Oz and the Magic Merry-Go-Round	Roger S. Baum	1992	
Lion of Oz and the Badge of Courage	Roger S. Baum	1995	An origin story for the Cowardly Lion describing him as a circus lion that came to Oz with the Wizard. Adapted into the animated film Lion of Oz in 2000.
The Green Star of Oz: A Special Oz Story	Roger S. Baum	2000	
Toto in Candy Land of Oz	Roger S. Baum	2000	
The Wizard of Oz and the Magic Merry-Go-Round	Roger S. Baum	2002	
Toto of Oz and the Surprise Party	Roger S. Baum	2004	
The Oz Odyssey	Roger S. Baum	2006	
Candy Cane: An Oz Christmas Tale	Roger S. Baum	2010	
Oz Odyssey II	Roger S. Baum	2011	
The Oz Enigma	Roger S. Baum	2013	

=== Books by other writers ===
Title	Writer	Year	Notes
The Number of the Beast	Robert A. Heinlein	1980	The story uses Oz as one of many alternate universe settings in which events take place, alongside alternate versions of the setting's Earth. An alternate version of the book was published in 2020 as The Pursuit of the Pankera.
A Barnstormer in Oz	Philip José Farmer	1982	Hank Stover, a pilot and the son of Dorothy Gale, finds himself in Oz when his plane gets lost in a green cloud over Kansas in 1923.
Return to Oz	Joan D. Vinge	1985	The novelization of Return to Oz (1985), which is based on the second and third books, The Land of Oz and Ozma of Oz.
Mr. Tinker in Oz	James Howe	1985	Dorothy meets the inventor of Tik-Tok the Clockwork Man. Part of a series called A Brand New Oz Adventure, which also included Dorothy and the Magic Belt by Susan Saunders, Dorothy and the Seven-Leaf Clover by Dorothy Haas and Ozma and the Wayward Wand by Polly Berends, all illustrated by David Rose and published by Random House.
Sir Harold and the Gnome King	L. Sprague de Camp	1991	
Was	Geoff Ryman	1992	Was employs the literary conceit that a Kansas girl named Dorothy existed and that, as a school teacher, L. Frank Baum made up the story of the first Oz book to entertain her.
Queen Ann in Oz	Karyl Carlson and Eric Gjovaag	1993	
The Magic Dishpan of Oz	Jeff Freedman	1994	
Home from Oz	Michael A. O'Donnell	1994	Home from Oz (Thomas Nelson, 1994) and The Oz Syndrome (Hillcrest Publishers, 2001) are by psychologist and professor, Dr. Michael A. O'Donnell which deal with the Oz characters and the MGM musical version from a psychological point of view.
The Dark Tower IV: Wizard and Glass	Stephen King	1997	The characters visit an unpopulated version of the Emerald City, called the Green Palace. The Palace is a combination of the versions from the 1939 film and the book, pulled from the protagonists' imaginations. The man sitting on the Wizard's throne turns out to be Marten Broadcloak, an alter-ego of one of the Dark Tower Series' main villains.
Visitors from Oz	Martin Gardner	1998	Dorothy, the Scarecrow, and the Tin Woodman use a Klein bottle to travel to New York City in 1998. Gardner's whimsical fantasy includes various characters from the Oz books as well as ancient Greek gods and characters from Lewis Carroll's Alice's Adventures in Wonderland.
The Unknown Witches of Oz	Dave Hardenbrook	2000	
The Secret Order of the Gumm Street Girls	Elise Primavera	2006	
Bloodstained Oz	Christopher Golden and James A. Moore	2006	
Oz Squad: March of the Tin Soldiers	Steve Ahlquist	2011	This novel takes place a few years after the end of the Oz Squad comic book series. The Squad rushes to foil a plot by Rebecca Eastwitch to enslave both Earth and Oz using the secrets of a grimoire stolen from the Library of Hell.
Oz Reimagined: New Tales from the Emerald City and Beyond	Douglas Cohen and John Joseph Adams	2013	a 2013 anthology edited by Douglas Cohen and John Joseph Adams published by Amazon Publishing's 47North imprint.
Dorothy Must Die	Danielle Paige	2014	A Young Adult reimagining of the Oz series in which Dorothy is a tyrant ruler of Oz. Followed by three sequels: The Wicked Will Rise (2015), Yellow Brick War (2016) and The End of Oz (2017).
Polychrome: A Romantic Fantasy	Ryk E. Spoor	2015	Two of Oz's enemies return and the Rainbow's daughter Polychrome brings a traveler from the mortal world to help them.
The Wicked Wizard of Oz	Jonathan Green	2017	An adventure gamebook, part of the ACE Gamebooks range published by Snowbooks.
Toto: The Dog-Gone Amazing Story of the Wizard of Oz	Michael Morpurgo	2017	
The Wonderful Wizard Of Oz (Toki Pona Edition)	Sonja Lang	2024	This is a Toki Pona translation of the story released in 2024. The book contains illustrations by Evan Dahm and English translations after each chapter in Toki Pona. It uses sitelen pona instead of latin letters.

== See also ==
- List of characters in the Oz books
- Books in the United States

== Sources ==
- Hearn, Michael Patrick (ed). (2000, 1973) The Annotated Wizard of Oz. W. W. Norton & Co. ISBN 0-393-04992-2
- Greene, David L. and Martin, Dick. (1977) The Oz Scrapbook. Random House. ISBN 0-394-41054-8
- Trust, Fred (2008) "Wizard of Oz books Collectors Price Guide."
