= Mara, Daughter of the Nile =

1953 book by Eloise Jarvis McGraw

- First edition
- Author: Eloise Jarvis McGraw
- Cover artist: Derek James
- Language: English
- Genre: Historical fiction
- Publisher: Coward McCann
- Publication date: 1953
- Publication place: United States
- Pages: 279
- ISBN: 0140319298

Mara, Daughter of the Nile by Eloise Jarvis McGraw is a historical fiction children's book from 1953, first published by Coward-McCann. It follows Mara, a young Egyptian slave girl who takes up a dangerous job as a double spy between two different masters.

== Plot ==
The story opens introducing the reader to Nekonkh, an Egyptian river boat captain on the Nile during the rule of Queen Hatshepsut. Nekonkh is on his way to Thebes, carrying his usual cargo and an unusual passenger, a supposed scribe's apprentice named Sheftu who seems to be someone more significant than he claims to be and occasionally alludes to replacing Hatshepsut on the throne with her younger half brother Thutmose, which is dangerous merely to mention. Nekonkh is waiting at the harbor in Menfe for Sheftu to return from an errand in town before the boat misses the tide.

Living in the ancient city of Menfe, Mara is a slave with unusual talents; she can read and write, as well as speak Babylonian. She also has bright blue eyes, which is rare in Egypt. Mara's master is tight-fisted when it comes to feeding his slaves, so she augments her diet by sneaking away from her work and stealing bread in the marketplace. One such visit occurs right under Sheftu's nose, during which Mara reveals herself to be both exceptionally clever and, once her master has caught her, fluent in Babylonian. It develops that Sheftu is in Menfe in order to persuade a decorated general out of retirement and to place him in command of the Pharaoh's bodyguard, a mission which he successfully accomplishes.

A second man has also observed Mara's antics in the marketplace, and interrupts her master's punishment, buying Mara outright. He later offers Mara the chance of a lifetime: if she will pose as the translator for a Babylonian princess who is betrothed to Prince Thutmose in order to spy on him. If she helps to uncover a suspected plot to place Thutmose on the throne she will gain her freedom and wealth. If she is discovered, she will die. Mara accepts instantly and is given gold with which to pay her passage up the river to Abydos, where she will don her disguise as an interpreter and meet the princess.

Mara secures passage on Nekonkh's boat, where she befriends Sheftu. Nekonkh, meanwhile, has suspected that Sheftu must be involved in a rebellion, and asks Sheftu if he may join it. Sheftu accepts Nekonkh's services, and reveals himself as one of the richest and most powerful men in Egypt. Sheftu allows their conversation to be overheard by Mara, who he guesses must have run away from her master. Sheftu plans to use Mara as a messenger for the rebellion, which Mara willingly agrees to do, even going so far as to suggest that she pose as an interpreter for the Babylonian princess. Sheftu gives Mara a ring with which to bribe a friend (whom Mara has fabricated) into helping her establish herself as the interpreter.

Mara enjoys her life at court so much that she decides to delay betraying Sheftu to her master, another powerful Egyptian aristocrat. She carries messages for Sheftu and throws small bits of information to her new master, Lord Nahereh, enough to keep him satisfied of her usefulness but not enough to reveal Sheftu. Sheftu invites Mara to an inn in Thebes where he meets with other rebels; here he is able to pass messages to her more easily and they spend a great deal of time together. Mara accidentally reveals the name of the inn to Nahereh, but he authorizes her to visit it and make friends with members of the plot to see if she can learn anything. As time goes on, Mara finds herself sympathizing more and more with Sheftu and the prince's cause, while also slowly falling in love with Sheftu. After a plan to gain more gold to bribe officials and pay for the rebellion nearly goes awry, Sheftu declares his love for Mara, but also discovers that she still has the ring that he gave her on the boat. Sheftu begins to suspect Mara's duplicitousness, and decides to set a trap for her to confirm his suspicions. Unfortunately for Mara, someone else takes the bait and springs the trap, leaving Sheftu with no choice but to murder Mara. Mara is able to escape him in an alley near the inn, and flees back to her quarters at the palace.

At the same time, Mara's cover with Nahereh is blown when he informs her that he was having her watched by another spy, and that he knows she was visiting the rebels' meeting place before he ordered her to go. She is locked in her rooms at the palace, but not before she discovers Nahereh's plans to raid the inn. Mara escapes the palace with the help of the Babylonian princess, whom she has befriended, and runs back to the inn to warn the others. Her warning comes just in time, and everyone is able to escape the inn with the exception of Mara herself, who is captured when Nahereh's soldiers arrive.

Mara is taken to the palace for interrogation, but claims not to know the leader of the rebellion, despite a harsh beating and offers of freedom and riches. Elsewhere in the city, Sheftu realizes that though Mara has been playing both sides, she has only been truly loyal to the rebellion, so he goes to her interrogation, planning to persuade Hatshepsut of its pointlessness. Sahure, a juggler who plays at both the Inn of the Falcon and at Nahereh's dinner parties, has also made an appearance at the interrogation, revealing himself as the spy who took the bait in the trap meant for Mara. Sahure identifies Sheftu as the leader in the rebellion, and is able to prove his claim by describing a bracelet that Sheftu is always wearing. All seems lost until the army, under the command of the general Sheftu persuaded out of retirement, as well as a large number of nobles, priests, and others storm the palace. The rebellion is successful, and Thutmose takes the throne, allowing Hatshepsut to die by her own hand (she drinks a goblet of poison). The sun rises on a new day for Egypt as Sheftu and Mara go home to Sheftu's grand house on the river.
