= The Hidden Valley of Oz =

1951 book by Rachel R. Cosgrove

- Author: Rachel R.C. Payes
- Illustrator: Dirk Gringhuis
- Language: English
- Series: The Oz Books
- Genre: Fantasy
- Publisher: Reilly & Lee
- Publication date: 1951
- Publication place: United States
- Media type: print (hardcover)
- Pages: 313 pp.
- Preceded by: The Shaggy Man of Oz
- Followed by: Merry Go Round in Oz

The Hidden Valley of Oz (1951) is the thirty-ninth book in the Oz series created by L. Frank Baum and his successors. It was written by Rachel R.C. Payes and illustrated by Dirk Gringhuis. The book was followed twelve years later by Merry Go Round in Oz (1963).

== Plot ==
Jonathan Andrew Manley, nicknamed Jam, is a boy from Ohio, the son of a biologist. At the start of the story, he is building a "collapsible kite" from plans he found in a popular magazine. Rather than cutting the pieces of his wooden frame to match the plans, however, he scales up the kite to match the size of his wood, yielding an extra-large result. The size of the thing inspires him to try to fly on it; he attaches a shipping crate, and gathers up three of his father's experimental animals (two guinea pigs and a white laboratory rat). A strong gust of wind lifts kite, crate, and passengers into the sky; Jam is on his way to the Land of Oz.

Kite and crate thump down the next day, in the purple landscape of the Gillikin Country. Jam is amazed to find that his animals can now talk; the guinea pigs call themselves Pinny and Gig, while the white rat introduces himself as Percy. Jam meets some of the inhabitants, who inform him of local conditions. This remote valley of Oz is dominated by a wrathful 50 ft. giant called Terp the Terrible, who enslaves the common people to work in his vineyards and his jam-making factory. Terp captures Jam, and is struck by his name; the giant threatens to spread the boy on his breakfast muffins the next day, and eat him. Terp imprisons the boy and his animals in the highest tower of his castle.

The courtyard of Terp's castle contains a magic muffin tree, guarded by a fierce monster. In the night, Percy is able to help Jam and friends escape the tower, with the aid of a handy grapevine. Jam and his pets flee, though Percy doubles back to steal one of the magic muffins. On the Gillikin plains, Jam and friends are menaced by the Equinots, hostile centaurs; Percy frightens away the Equinots when he eats some of the magic muffin, and grows to ten times his normal size.

A local farmer and his wife provide shelter for the night; Pinny and Gig, who have little taste for adventure, decide to stay at the farm as pets of the farmer's children. Another kite flight takes Jam and Percy to the tin castle of the Emperor of the Winkies, the Tin Woodman. There, the party is soon joined by Dorothy Gale, the Scarecrow, the Cowardly Lion, and the Hungry Tiger. After hearing Jam's tale, the assembled party decide to defeat Terp and free the oppressed Gillikins.

Their path from the Winkie Country to the Hidden Valley in Gillikin Country leads through a wilderness; a commotion in the jungle brings them a new friend on their quest in the form of the Leopard with the Changeable Spots who is an outcast to his fellow leopards. They nickname him "Spots". They enter Bookville, where a hostile King and his royal court condemn them to be pressed into books. Percy gnaws the travelers a way out of their bookshelf prison during the night. Another disagreeable adventure awaits them in Icetown which is inhabited by snowmen. To escape an igloo prison, the Scarecrow volunteers his stuffing as kindling for a fire.

The travelers, with a re-stuffed Scarecrow, eventually reach the Hidden Valley in Gillikin Country. Percy's shrinking-and-growing experiences with the magic muffin have made them realize that Terp needs a steady supply of muffins to maintain his giant stature. Jam and company, with local collaboration, lure Terp away from his castle and hypnotize the guardian beast into harmlessness. The Tin Man chops down the magic tree, killing it. Terp is trapped in the smokestack of the jam factory until he shrinks to his normal size.

The party travel to the Emerald City, where Jam is welcomed as a hero. After a celebratory banquet, Ozma and the Wizard send the boy home to Ohio once more. Percy remains in Oz and convinces the Wizard to enchant him into his large size permanently.

== Development ==
Cosgrove originally intended to have Jam travel to Oz by rocket, but the publishers informed her that that had already been done in The Yellow Knight of Oz. The revised first chapter is believed to be the work of Francis Joseph O'Donnell, one of Reilly & Lee's main editors. Cosgrove's original opening was published posthumously in an issue of Oz-story Magazine. She later gave an account of how she wrote and revised Hidden Valley and worked with the personnel at Reilly & Lee. Her article appeared in The Baum Bugle, and was later included as an Afterword in the 1991 edition of Hidden Valley. Among the trivia she remarked on in this article was that the editors had added in Jam's catchphrase "Golly" and Percy's catchphrase "Kiddo," both of which she initially disliked.

Cosgrove created Percy the white rat based on her experience in laboratory work; she considered lab rats "fascinating" and "clever." Percy, who calls himself "the personality kid," is an extrovert, a classic American wise guy; he calls everyone "kiddo." Cosgrove liked the character enough to use him again, in her second Oz book, The Wicked Witch of Oz, and in a short story, "Percy and the Shrinking Violet."

Cosgrove used the Leopard again in her story "Spots in Oz."

Cogrove began work on a second Oz book soon after finishing the first; but Reilly & Lee declined it, due to low sales for Oz books in the 1950s. The work would finally appear in print forty years later as The Wicked Witch of Oz.

== Reception ==
Baum biographer Katharine M. Rogers says that this book "recaptures the humor and inventiveness of [Ruth Plumly] Thompson." David L. Greene and Dick Martin agree that "The Hidden Valley is closer to vintage Ruth Plumly Thompson than to anything by Neill or Snow."

The Oz books
Previous book: The Shaggy Man of Oz	The Hidden Valley of Oz; 1951	Next book: Merry Go Round in Oz
