= William Corbin (author) =

American writer

William Corbin McGraw (born January 22, 1916, in Des Moines, Iowa, died June 6, 1999, in Portland, Oregon), known professionally as William Corbin, was an author and novelist of books for adults and children.

== Career ==
He started his writing career as a newspaperman and later married Eloise Jarvis McGraw (née Hamilton), also an author. Corbin became more serious about writing fiction and moved into a house with a 23-acre filbert orchard to do so. Several of Corbin's works received awards.

His novel Smoke was made into a movie of the same name in 1970, airing as part of The Wonderful World of Disney, and starring Ron Howard, Earl Holliman, and Pamelyn Ferdin. A British television series based on Corbin's Horse in the House was produced from 1977 to 1979.

== Personal life ==
William Corbin and Eloise had two children, Lauren and Peter McGraw.

== Works ==
- Deadline (1952)
- Horse in House (1964)
- Smoke (1967)
- The Everywhere Cat (1970)
- The Day Willie Wasn't (1971)
- The Prettiest Gargoyle (1971)
- The Pup with the Up and Down Tail (1972)
- Golden Mare
- High Road Home
- A Dog Worth Stealing
- Pony for Keeps
- Me and the End of the World
