= The Forbidden Fountain of Oz =

1980 children's novel by Eloise Jarvis McGraw and Lauren Lynn Mcgraw

- First edition
- Author: Eloise Jarvis McGraw and Lauren Lynn McGraw
- Illustrator: Dick Martin
- Language: English
- Series: The Oz Books
- Genre: Fantasy
- Publisher: International Wizard of Oz Club
- Publication date: 1980
- Publication place: United States
- Media type: Print (paperback)
- Pages: 98
- Preceded by: The Enchanted Island of Oz
- Followed by: The Ozmapolitan of Oz

The Forbidden Fountain of Oz is a 1980 children's novel written by Eloise Jarvis McGraw and her daughter Lauren Lynn Mcgraw (or McGraw Wagner), and illustrated by Dick Martin. The novel is in the long-running Oz series written by L. Frank Baum and his many successors.

== The plot ==
A child named Emeralda Ozgood, a native of the Emerald City, prepares a concoction of limeade to celebrate the annual Clover Fair — but she naively uses water from the Forbidden Fountain. She only has one customer before she drops and breaks her pitcher; but that customer is Princess Ozma, who drinks the drink and loses her memory. Wandering off and losing her crown, Ozma falls in with a series of new acquaintances, including the Monarch of the Butterflies (who names her "Poppy" after the flowers in her hair) and a talking hedgebird who advises her.

Outfitted in boy's clothes and hat, Ozma/Poppy meets a lamb named Lambert, who is ostracized from his Gillikin flock for his unnatural white color. The two stumble into Camouflage Creek, and undergo a bewildering string of transformations into bugs and beasts. Back in their own forms, they are confronted by an inept would-be highwayman named Tobias Bridlecull Jr., who quickly becomes the third member of their rambling trio. He carries a Suggestion Box that volunteers suggestions instead of receiving them — as in "Suggest lunch" and "Suggest oil for Suggestion Box."

Returning home to Pumperdink from the Clover Fair, Kabumpo the Elegant Elephant falls into adventures of his own; he is waylaid by the animated toys of Wyndup Town. The elephant literally bumps into "Poppy" and company among the bubblegum and mucilage geysers (or "gozzers") of Gozzerland National Park. The four travelers combine, for further adventures in Cleanitupia and Pristinia. It is only when Kabumpo sees "Poppy" with her long hair unconfined that he recognizes Ozma; then he needs to win the trust of the suspicious amnesiac and bring her home to the Emerald City. (He fails completely at the winning of trust, and hauls her back bodily.) Eventually, Ozma uses the Magic Belt to restore her memory and return to normal. The Forbidden Fountain is sealed off forever, as a threat.

== Development ==
The McGraws, mother and daughter, wrote an earlier Oz book, Merry Go Round in Oz, published in 1963. In their collaboration, the elder McGraw, a veteran children's book author, did the actual writing; she credited her daughter Lauren with story contributions. In Forbidden Fountain, the text is prefaced with an address to "Dear Fans of Oz, Young, Old, and In-Between," which calls Lauren Lynn McGraw "Assistant Inventor and Head Trouble-Shooter," while Eloise Jarvis McGraw signs herself as "Chief of Bureau of Extraordinary Communications."

The McGraws, like other Oz authors, have to make choices among the vast and sometimes contradictory details of life in Oz. They choose to give Oz a currency (of "ozzos" and "piozters"); but in the third chapter of The Emerald City of Oz, Baum specifically states that there is "no such thing as money..." in Oz. (As the Tin Woodman says in the fifteenth chapter of The Road to Oz, "Money in Oz!...What a queer idea!") Baum, however, was not wholly consistent in this detail (as in others), and the early books in the series do feature Oz currency.

The Oz books
| Previous book: The Enchanted Island of Oz | The Forbidden Fountain of Oz; 1980 | Next book: The Ozmapolitan of Oz |
