= Oz-story Magazine =

Oz-story Magazine was an annual periodical devoted to the literature and art of Oz, the fantasy land created by L. Frank Baum. It was published in six volumes between 1995 and 2000.

Oz-story was published by Hungry Tiger Press, and edited by David Maxine, assisted by Eric Shanower, who was responsible for a significant share of the artwork in the volumes. Oz-story printed a variety of Oz-related features and illustrations, by writers and artists closely associated with the Oz mythos: Baum, Ruth Plumly Thompson, W. W. Denslow, John R. Neill, Jack Snow, Rachel Cosgrove Payes and many others, including modern contemporaries like Shanower and Edward Einhorn.

The most notable single work in the six volumes of Oz-story was arguably Eloise Jarvis McGraw's novel The Rundelstone of Oz, never previously published, which appeared in the sixth and final volume. Rare Baum novels were reprinted in Oz-story:

- Sam Steele's Adventures on Land and Sea in No. 1
- Policeman Bluejay in No. 2
- The Flying Girl in No. 3
- Daughters of Destiny in No. 4
- The Woggle-Bug Book in No. 5
- Annabel in No. 6.

Oz-story generally earned high praise from critics and reviewers during its limited existence.
