= Hungry Tiger Press =

American publishing company

- Founded: 1994
- Founder: David Maxine and Eric Shanower
- Country of origin: United States
- Headquarters location: Portland, Oregon
- Publication types: Books, compact discs, comic books and graphic novels
- Official website: www.hungrytigerpress.com

Hungry Tiger Press is an American specialty publisher of books, compact discs, comic books and graphic novels, focused on the works of L. Frank Baum, other authors of Oz books, and related Americana. Hungry Tiger has also published rare, early, long-neglected dramatic and musical adaptations of the Oz works, featuring music by Louis F. Gottschalk, Paul Tietjens, and other composers of the early twentieth century.

Co-founded by David Maxine and Eric Shanower in 1994, the Press is run by Maxine from its Portland headquarters. It has issued first editions and revival editions of a number of works in its genre, including:

- Edward Einhorn's Paradox in Oz (1999) and The Living House of Oz (2005)
- Eloise Jarvis McGraw's The Rundelstone of Oz (2001)
- Jack Snow's Spectral Snow: The Dark Fantasies of Jack Snow (2002)
- Eric Shanower's The Salt Sorcerer of Oz and Other Stories (2002)
- L. Frank Baum's Daughters of Destiny; or, the Girl in the Harem (2005)
- Baum's The Visitors from Oz (2005)
- The Pawprint Adventures, reprinting Baum's pseudonymous young adult novels.

Many of these editions feature Shanower's illustrations. Hungry Tiger also published the annual Oz-story Magazine from 1995 to 2000.

The Press's name and iconography derive from the Hungry Tiger, the character that Baum introduced in his third Oz book, Ozma of Oz. The introductory section of Oz-story was titled "Fat Babies for Dinner", a reference to the Hungry Tiger's never-satisfied appetite for that diet.
