= Merry Go Round in Oz =

1963 book by Eloise Jarvis McGraw and Lauren McGraw Wagner

- First edition
- Author: Eloise Jarvis McGraw and Lauren McGraw Wagner
- Illustrator: Dick Martin
- Language: English
- Series: The Oz Books
- Genre: Fantasy
- Publisher: Reilly & Lee
- Publication date: 1963
- Publication place: United States
- Media type: Print (hardcover)
- Pages: 303 pp.
- Preceded by: The Hidden Valley of Oz
- Followed by: Yankee in Oz

Merry Go Round in Oz (1963) is the fortieth book in the Oz series created by L. Frank Baum and his successors. It was written by Eloise Jarvis McGraw and McGraw's daughter, Lauren McGraw Wagner. It was illustrated by Dick Martin.

Merry Go Round in Oz is the last of the "Famous Forty" and the last "official" Oz novel entry. Reilly & Lee had declined offers from many other writers, including previous author Rachel R. Cosgrove, to publish a fortieth Oz novel entry because of poor sales, but were persuaded by McGraw's two Newbery Awards to admit a fortieth book into the series. The sales of Merry Go Round were not good enough to convince the publishers to continue the series.

== Synopsis ==
Halidom and Troth are two adjacent principalities within the Land of Oz, both resembling medieval kingdoms. Heir to the throne of Halidom is Prince Gules. The people of Halidom have always derived their physical and mental abilities from three golden circlets worn by their ruler: the first around his forehead, the second on his right forearm, the third on his right thumb. The first circlet confers intelligence upon all the citizens of Halidom, the second confers physical strength and fighting prowess; the third confers manual dexterity and craftsmanship. The first and third circlets have been lost before the beginning of the book, with attendant loss of abilities by the subjects of Halidom.

Fess is a young pageboy in the household of Prince Gules, but Fess was born in Troth, so the circlets have no effect on him. Awakening one day to discover that all the natives of Halidom are strangely languid, Fess learns that the second (and last remaining) circlet has been stolen. He embarks on a quest with Prince Gules, aided by a unicorn and a Flittermouse (a mouse with wings) to retrieve all three.

Meanwhile, Dorothy Gale and the Cowardly Lion temporarily leave the Emerald City to place an order with the Easter Bunny, whose underground domain is conveniently accessible from Oz. Having placed the order, they get lost on the way back, and meet and join the Prince and Fess in their quest.

Robin Brown, an orphan from Oregon, USA, rides a magic merry-go-round horse to the Land of Oz. The horse whisks him to the Quadling and Munchkin Countries of Oz, where Robin has adventures in View Halloo (a region dedicated to fox-hunting) and Roundabout (a land where everything is round, inhabited by Roundheads). The Roundheads mistake him for a new king foretold by a prophecy, and force him to remain there and serve as their king. Dorothy's party happens on Roundabout and help Robin to escape. Eventually, Robin must help find the missing magic circlets of Halidom.

== Reception ==
Merry Go Round in Oz received a largely critical review in Kirkus Reviews, which wrote, "Strange amalgam. Take one large portion of The Wonderful Wizard of Oz, lend in a half portion, diluted, of King Arthur and The Knights of the Round Table, a dash of Alice—then close your eyes and take a long swallow."

The Oz books
Previous book: The Hidden Valley of Oz	Merry Go Round of Oz; 1963	Next book: Yankee in Oz
