= Rachel Cosgrove Payes =

American novelist

Rachel Ruth Cosgrove Payes, also known as E. L. Arch and Joanne Kaye (11 December 1922, Westernport, Maryland – 10 October 1998, Brick Township, New Jersey) was an American genre novelist, and author of books on the Land of Oz.

== Biography ==
Born in Maryland to mine foreman Jacob A. Cosgrove and teacher Martha (née Brake), Cosgrove was educated at West Virginia Wesleyan College (B.S. 1943). Trained as a research biologist, she worked as a medical technologist at various hospitals. She married Norman Morris Payes in 1954; they had a son and daughter.

Her first book, The Hidden Valley of Oz, was published by Reilly & Lee in 1951. Her second, The Wicked Witch of Oz (1954) was denied publication on the grounds that the Oz books were not selling. The book was published by The International Wizard of Oz Club in 1993. She had a tendency to dismiss adult Oz fans and insist that Oz books are "for kids!", a view she expressed in the documentary, Oz: The American Fairyland.

The bulk of Cosgrove's work consisted of historical romance novels, many published by Playboy Press, one under the name Joanne Kaye. She also wrote science fiction novels for Avalon Books under the name "E.L. Arch", an anagram of Rachel, as well as shorter sf and fantasy under her own name. Payes also wrote gothics, such as The Black Swan.

== Publications ==
- The Hidden Valley of Oz (Reilly & Lee, 1951)
- Bridge to Yesterday (Avalon Books, 1963)
- Planet of Death (Avalon, 1964)
- The Deathstones (Avalon, 1964)
- The First Immortals (Avalon, 1965)
- The Double-Minded Man (Avalon, 1966)
- The Man with Three Eyes (Thomas Bouregy & Co.,1967)
- O Caritable Death (Robert Hale Limited, 1968)
- "Mattie Harris Galactic Spy" (Vertex, 1974)
- "Tower of Babble" (Vertex, 1974)
- "The Eyes of the Blind" (Vertex, 1975)
- The Black Swan (Berkeley, 1975)
- Moment of Desire (Playboy Press, 1978)
- The Coach to Hell (Playboy Press, 1979)
- Bride of Fury (Playboy Press, 1980)
- Satan's Mistress (Playboy Press, 1981)
- Seven Sisters Series (Playboy Press, 1981)
  - Book 1: Love's Charade
  - Book 2: Love's Renegade
  - Book 3: Love's Promenade
  - Book 4: Love's Serenade
  - Book 5: Love's Escapade
- Lady Alicia's Secret (Harlequin Regency, 1986)
- The Wicked Witch of Oz (The International Wizard of Oz Club, 1993)
- "Percy and the Shrinking Violet" (Hungry Tiger Press, 1995)
- "Spots in Oz" (Hungry Tiger Press, 1997)
- "Rocket Trip to Oz" (Hungry Tiger Press, 2000)
