= Eloise Jarvis McGraw =

American author

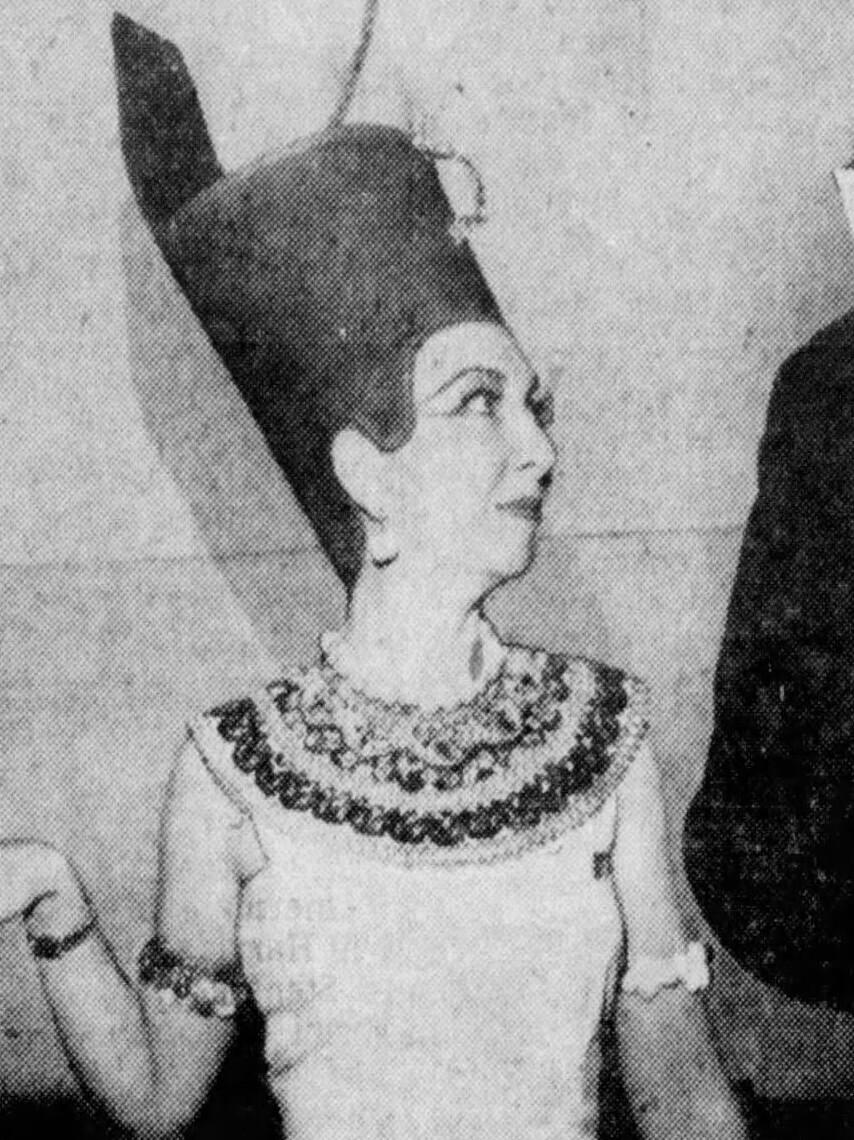
- Eloise Jarvis McGraw, at a party at the Oregon Free Lance Writers Club, in 1958, in fancy dress to celebrate the publishing, that year, of her book Pharaoh
- Born: December 9, 1915
- Died: November 30, 2000 (aged 84)
- Spouse: William Corbin McGraw (d. 1999)
- Children: 2
- Writing career
- Genres: Children's, Young adult, Historical

Eloise Jarvis McGraw (née Hamilton; December 9, 1915 – November 30, 2000) was an American author of children's books and young adult novels.

== Early life ==
Eloise Jarvis McGraw was born on December 9, 1915 in Houston, Texas. At age 8 her family moved to Oklahoma City, at which time she began writing.

== Career ==
McGraw's first professional writing was published in Jack and Jill magazine in 1949. She also published short stories in Cricket, Parents’ Magazine, and The Writer. Her first published book was Sawdust in His Shoes (1950), followed by a steady stream of works for both children and adults. Before turning fully to books, McGraw worked as a journalist. McGraw also contributed to the Oz series started by L. Frank Baum; working with her daughter, graphic artist and librarian Lauren Lynn McGraw, she wrote Merry Go Round in Oz (the last of the Oz books issued by Baum's publisher) and The Forbidden Fountain of Oz. The actual writing of the books was done entirely by Eloise; Lauren made story contributions significant enough for Eloise to assign her co-authorship credit. McGraw's The Rundelstone of Oz was published in 2000 without a credit to her daughter.

Author Gina Wickwar credited McGraw with help in the editing of her book The Hidden Prince of Oz (2000).

McGraw painted the cover art for most of her books. She also designed the jacket for The Moorchild and three of her earlier books.

=== Awards ===
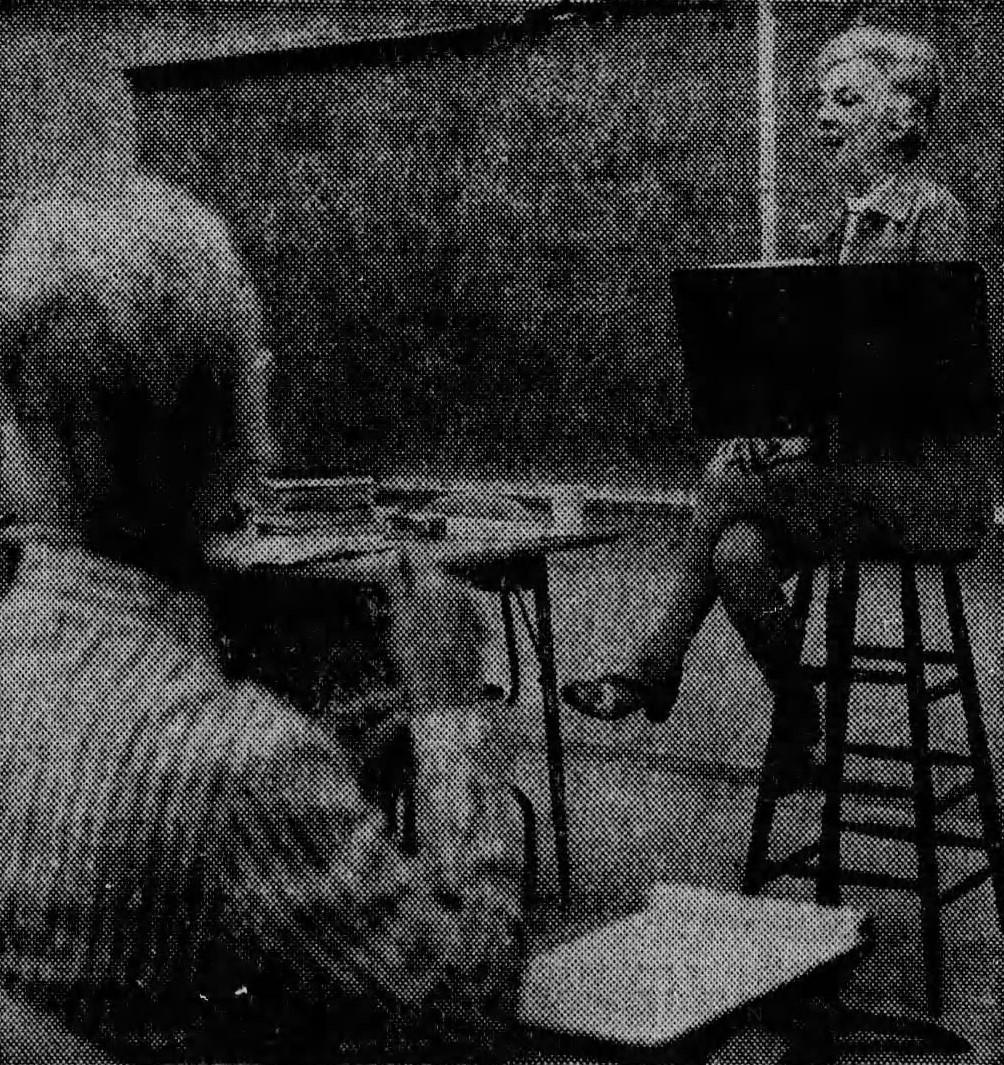
McGraw, conducts workshop on "Writing for Juveniles", 1973

She was awarded the Newbery Honor three times in three different decades, for her novels Moccasin Trail (1952), The Golden Goblet (1962), and The Moorchild (1997). A Really Weird Summer (1977) won an Edgar Award for Best Juvenile Mystery from the Mystery Writers of America, as later did Tangled Web (1993). McGraw had a very strong interest in history, and among the many books she wrote for children are Greensleeves, The Seventeenth Swap, The Striped Ships and Mara, Daughter of the Nile. A Lewis Carroll Shelf Award was given to Moccasin Trail in 1963.

== Personal life ==
McGraw lived for many years in Portland, Oregon before dying in late 2000 of "complications of cancer." She was married to William Corbin McGraw, who died in 1999. They had two children, Peter and Lauren.

== Bibliography ==
- Sawdust in His Shoes (1950)
- Crown Fire (1951)
- Moccasin Trail (1952; Newbery Award winner)
- Mara, Daughter of the Nile (1953)
- Pharaoh (1958; adult novel, set in Ancient Egypt)
- "Techniques of Fiction Writing", Writer (1959)
- The Golden Goblet (1961; Newbery Award winner)
- Merry Go Round in Oz (1963; co-author Lauren Lynn McGraw)
- Greensleeves (1968)
- Master Cornhill (1973)
- A Really Weird Summer (1977; Edgar Award winner)
- Joel and the Great Merlini (1979)
- The Forbidden Fountain of Oz (1980, co-author Lauren Lynn McGraw)
- The Money Room (1981)
- Hideaway (1983)
- The Seventeenth Swap (1986)
- The Trouble With Jacob (1988)
- The Striped Ships (1991)
- Tangled Webb (1993; Edgar Award nominee)
- The Moorchild (1996; Newbery Award winner)
- "Pajamas, the Sleepyhead Elf", Oz-story Magazine #4 (1998)
- The Rundelstone of Oz (2000; initially published in Oz-story Magazine #6)
