= In the Land of the Wizard of Oz =

- Directed by: Lucjan Dembiński; Alina Kotowska; Janusz Galewicz; Krystyna Kulczycka
- Written by: Janusz Galewicz; Maria Kossakowska
- Starring: Ilona Kuśmierska; Piotr Fronczewski; Jerzy Tkaczyk; Andrzej Stockinger; Ewa Kania; Krzysztof Krupiński
- Cinematography: Grzegorz Świetlikowski
- Edited by: Barbara Sarnocińska; Henryka Sitek
- Music by: Włodzimierz Stefanowicz
- Production company: Se-ma-for
- Distributed by: Przedsiębiorstwo Dystrybucji Filmów
- Country: Poland
- Language: Polish

W krainie czarnoksiężnika Oza is a Polish theatrical cartoon short series produced by Se-ma-for based on The Wonderful Wizard of Oz and The Marvelous Land of Oz by L. Frank Baum. 13 cartoons were produced between 1983 and 1989, and released to theatres by Przedsiębiorstwo Dystrybucji Filmów.

== Voice cast ==
- Ilona Kuśmierska as Dorothy
- Piotr Fronczewski as the Scarecrow (episodes 1-7)
- Krzysztof Krupiński as:
  - the Scarecrow (episodes 8-13),
  - Jack Pumpkinhead,
  - the Sawhorse
- Jerzy Tkaczyk as the Tin Woodman
- Andrzej Stockinger as the Cowardly Lion
- Ewa Kania as Tip / Princess Ozma
- Ewa Złotowska as Glinda the Fairy
- Alina Bukowska as:
  - The Wicked Witch of the East,
  - The Wicked Witch of the West,
  - Aunt Em
- Ewa Ziętek as Jellia / Jinjur
- Jacek Czyż as the Wizard of Oz
- Andrzej Gawroński as:
  - King of the Flying Monkeys,
  - Additional voices
- Leopold Matuszczak as:
  - Uncle Henry,
  - The Gump,
  - Additional voices
- Aleksandra Koncewicz as Narrator
