= Queen Lurline =

Fictional character

- Oz character
- First appearance: The Tin Woodman of Oz (1918)
- Last appearance: Time Travelers of Oz (2003)
- Created by: L. Frank Baum

In-universe information
- Alias: Lulea
- Species: Fairy
- Gender: Female
- Title: Queen of the Fairies
- Spouse: Pastoria
- Children: Ozma (daughter)
- Relatives: Her fairy band; L. Frank Baum said she descends from a long line of fairy Queens

Queen Lurline is a fictional character in the Oz books by L. Frank Baum and other authors.

The name "Lurline" is a variant of Lorelei, the Rhine nymph; the name has been used for ships, and has other associations.

== Lurline in L. Frank Baum's books ==
=== Descriptions in the Oz books ===
In the Oz mythos, Lurline is first mentioned in The Tin Woodman of Oz. She is the ethereal Queen of the Fairies and their creator. She is credited with enchanting the Land of Oz centuries ago so that it became a fairy country. Prior to this, Oz was just an ordinary country shut off from the rest of the world by four impassable deserts. After enchanting the country, Lurline left Princess Ozma to rule the country together with King Pastoria.

Lurline is therefore a fundamental ingredient in the backstory or foundation myth of Oz; and as such she recurs in various subsequent Oz books — as in Edward Einhorn's Paradox in Oz — and is at least mentioned in others — from Baum's Glinda of Oz to Dave Hardenbrook's The Unknown Witches of Oz.

=== Possible references in other series ===
In Baum's book, The Life and Adventures of Santa Claus, the Queen of the Fairies is unnamed, and the Queen of the Wood Nymphs is named Zurline. Some debate exists among fans of the Oz books as to whether the unnamed Fairy Queen and Lurline are the same person. Queen Zixi of Ix depicts another Fairy Queen named Lulea, who is based in the Forest of Burzee, just as The Fairy Queen and Queen Zurline of the Wood Nymphs are. Some modern Oz authors treat Lulea and Lurline as the same person.

== Lurline in Gregory Maguire's books ==
Lurline is referenced in Wicked: The Life and Times of the Wicked Witch of the West, Gregory Maguire's 1995 revisionist novel set in Oz; she is sometimes called "Lurlina". Maguire's version of Lurline is depicted as the central figure in a pagan religion in Oz. Although faith in the fairy queen Lurline is described as out of fashion, Oz celebrates a winter holiday dedicated to her, known as Lurlinemas. Lurline's followers are sometimes persecuted by believers in one of Oz's other major religion, Unionism, which worships "The Unnamed God."
