= The Rousters =

- Genre: Action; Drama; Tongue-in-cheek humor
- Created by: Stephen J. Cannell
- Starring: Hoyt Axton; Chad Everett; Timothy Gibbs; Mimi Rogers; Maxine Stuart; Jim Varney
- Opening theme: "Tough Enough" performed by Ronnie Milsap
- Composers: Mike Post; Stephen Geyer
- Country of origin: United States
- Original language: English
- No. of seasons: 1
- No. of episodes: 13

Production
- Executive producer: Stephen J. Cannell
- Editor: John Elias
- Running time: 60 minutes
- Production company: Stephen J. Cannell Productions

Original release
- Network: NBC
- Release: October 1, 1983 – July 21, 1984

The Rousters is an American adventure drama television series about a group of modern-day bounty hunters who are descendants of legendary lawman Wyatt Earp. It aired on NBC from October 1, 1983, until July 21, 1984. Despite advertising claims that this series would "sink The Love Boat" in the ratings, it was canceled in mid-season after only 6 of its 13 episodes had aired, with the remaining shows being burned off during the summer of 1984.

== Premise ==
Wyatt Earp III (Chad Everett) works as a bouncer for the traveling Sladetown Carnival, run by "Cactus Jack" Slade (Hoyt Axton). Wyatt doesn't care for his embarrassing name or the legacy it represents, but his shotgun-toting mother Amanda (Maxine Stuart) wants to carry on the "family tradition" of keeping law and order through bounty hunting.

Wyatt's brother Evan (Jim Varney) has a penchant for con artistry and bungled repair-work; this character is mostly comic relief. Slade's lion-taming daughter Ellen (Mimi Rogers) is dating Wyatt and tutoring his teenage son Michael (Timothy Gibbs).

== Cast ==
- Chad Everett as Wyatt Earp III
- Maxine Stuart as Amanda Earp
- Hoyt Axton as "Cactus Jack" Slade
- Mimi Rogers as Ellen Slade
- Jim Varney as Evan Earp
- Timothy Gibbs as Michael Earp

== Episodes ==
No.	Title	Directed by	Written by	Original release date	Prod. code
1	"The Marshal of Sladetown"	E.W. Swackhamer	Stephen J. Cannell	October 1, 1983	3000
2	"The Carnival That Ate Sladetown"	Joseph Pevney	Stephen J. Cannell	October 15, 1983	3101
3	"Finders Keepers"	Dennis Donnelly	Mark Jones	October 22, 1983	3102
4	"A Picture's Worth a Thousand Dollars"	Arnold Laven	Babs Greyhosky	October 29, 1983	3103
5	"Eye Witness Blues"	Ron Satlof	Babs Greyhosky	December 20, 1983	3112
6	"Everybody Loves a Clown"	Guy Magar	Frank Lupo	December 27, 1983	3104
7	"Never Trust a Crystal Ball"	Barry Crane	Terrence McDonnell	June 9, 1984	3105
8	"Two and a Half Days of the Condor"	Bruce Kessler	Mark Jones & Babs Greyhosky	June 16, 1984	3108
9	"Slade vs. Slade"	Guy Magar	Babs Greyhosky	June 23, 1984	3106
10	"Snake Eyes"	Sigmund Neufeld Jr.	Mark Jones	June 30, 1984	3110
11	"Cold Streak"	Georg Stanford Brown	Jim Carlson & Terrence McDonnell	July 7, 1984	3107
12	"This Town Ain't Big Enough for the Twelve of Us"	Guy Magar	Mark Jones	July 14, 1984	3111
13	"Wyatt Earp to the Rescue"	Arnold Laven	Jeff Ray	July 21, 1984	3109
