= Spiral Zone =

- Spiral Zone title card
- Genre: Animation; Action
- Created by: Diana Dru Botsford
- Developed by: Jim Carlson; Terrence McDonnell
- Directed by: Pierre DeCelles; Georges Grammat
- Starring: Mona Marshall; Frank Welker; Dan Gilvezan; Michael Bell; Hal Rayle; Denny Delk; Neil Ross
- Theme music composer: Stephanie Tyrell; Max Gronenthal; Ashley Hall
- Composers: David Kitay; Richard Kosinski; Sam Winans; Ashley Hall; Steve Tyrell
- Country of origin: United States
- Original language: English
- No. of seasons: 1
- No. of episodes: 65

Production
- Executive producers: Edd Griles; Donald Kushner; Peter Locke; Mark Ludke; Ray Volpe
- Producer: Diana Dru Botsford
- Running time: 20 min.
- Production companies: Atlantic/Kushner-Locke; The Maltese Companies; Orbis Communications

Original release
- Network: First-run syndication
- Release: September 21 – December 18, 1987

Spiral Zone is a 1987 American science-fiction animated series produced by Atlantic/Kushner-Locke. Spiral Zone was animated by Japanese studio Visual 80, as well as South Korean studio AKOM. Based in part on a toyline made by Japanese company Bandai, the series focuses on an international group of soldiers fighting to free the world from a scientist who controls much of the Earth's surface. It only ran for one season, with a total count of 65 episodes.

== Development ==
Tonka acquired the license from Bandai and created a different treatment to the series, plus a short-lived toyline.

== Plot ==
In the year 2007, a brilliant but twisted military scientist named Dr. James Bent uses a neon military Space Shuttle to drop his deadly Zone Generators across half of the Earth, thus creating a region called the Spiral Zone due to its shape.

Millions of people are trapped in the dark mists of the Spiral Zone and transformed into "Zoners" with lifeless yellow eyes and strange red patches on their skin. Because they have no will to resist, Dr. James Bent - now known as Overlord - makes them his slave army and controls them from the Chrysler Building in New York City.

His followers are known as the Black Widows: Bandit, Duchess Dire, Razorback, Reaper, Crook, and Raw Meat. They are immune to the mind-altering effects of the Zone because of a special device called the Widow Maker, but due to prolonged exposure to the Zone, they display the same physical effects to their bodies as normal people caught inside the Zone, which has dark skies and Zone spores growing in many places. Overlord seeks to conquer the world by bringing everyone under control with the Zone Generators. The Zones feed off human energy, which is why Overlord does not kill anyone inside.

With major cities Zoned, the nations of the world put aside their own differences to fight the Black Widows, but only five soldiers using special suits to protect themselves from the Zone could do it. While easy to destroy, Zone Generators are impossible to capture because of booby traps. Overlord would also drop more generators on remaining military and civilian centers and force the Zone Riders into a standoff.

== Characters ==
=== Black Widows ===
Bent not only invented the Zone Generators but also an antidote process giving him immunity to the bacteria. He uses this process on his small group of soldiers. While immune to the mind-altering effects, each Black Widow still has lesions on their skin and have yellow dilated eyes.

- Overlord (Dr. James Bent; voiced by Neil Ross) is a commander and rebel scientist.
- Bandit (information unknown; voiced by Neil Ross) is a master of disguise, a terrorist of Middle Eastern origin.
- Duchess Dire (Ursula Dire; voiced by Mona Marshall) is a charming woman of British nationality, and is an assignment expert, hardened criminal, and Overlord's mistress.
- Razorback (Al Krak; voiced by Frank Welker) - is an aggressive loudmouth who specializes in bladed weapons.
- Reaper (Mathew Riles; voiced by Denny Delk) is a manhunter.
- Crook (Jean Duprey) is a French scientist who tricks Reaper into becoming immune to the spiral zone in the episode "Shall You Reaper".
- Rawmeat (Richard Welt; voiced by Hal Rayle) is a truck driver who got tricked through Bandit in an episode called "Bandit and the Smokies".

=== Black Widow vehicles ===
Overlord rides the Bullwhip Cannon, an eight-wheel all-terrain vehicle equipped with a large laser cannon. The other Black Widows ride Sledge Hammers, a one-man minitank that has triangular caterpillar tracks and has whirling mace arms on either side. They also have a special delta-winged aircraft called the Intruder.

=== Zone Riders ===
Overlord's initial strike put all the major capitals of the world in the Zone. The chaos sparks international cooperation even between the United States and the Soviet Union. To counter the effects of the Zone bacteria, British scientists create a rare material called Neutron-90, but only a limited amount of Neutron-90 is remaining in the world after the British government orders the destruction of the only laboratory where the material is produced. There is only enough material left to build combat suits for five specially-trained soldiers called the Spiral Force, also known as the "Zone Riders".

- Colonel Dirk Courage (voiced by Dan Gilvezan) is a Zone Riders leader from the United States.
- MSgt Tank Schmidt (voiced by Neil Ross) is a heavy weapons specialist from West Germany.
- Lt Hiro Taka (voiced by Michael Bell) is an infiltration specialist from Japan.
- 2nd Lt Max Jones (voiced by Hal Rayle) is a special mission expert from the United States.
- Cpl Katerina Anastacia (voiced by Mona Marshall) is a medical officer from the Soviet Union.

As the series advances, the Zone Riders discover that there is still enough Neutron-90 left over from assembling the five suits, sufficient to build two additional suits. They are issued to Australian demolition specialist Lt Ned Tucker and field scientist Lt Benjamin Davis Franklin.

=== Zone Rider vehicles ===
The Zone Riders are deployed around the world from a mountain base called the Mission Command Central, or MCC. Dirk Courage rides the Rimfire, a monowheel vehicle equipped with a large cannon on top. The other Zone Riders ride armored combat monocycles and wear special backpacks.

== Episodes ==
1. Holographic Zone Battle (written by Richard Mueller)
2. King of the Skies (written by Francis Moss)
3. Errand of Mercy (written by Eric Lewald and Andrew Yates)
4. Mission Into Evil (written by Fettes Gray, a pseudonym for J. Michael Straczynski)
5. Back to the Stone Age (written by Michael Reaves and Steve Perry)
6. Small Packages (written by Mark Edens)
7. Zone of Darkness (written by Mark Edens)
8. The Gauntlet (written by Michael Reaves and Steve Perry)
9. Ride the Whirlwind (story by Lydia C. Marano and Arthur Byron Cover, teleplay by Mark Edens)
10. The Unexploded Pod (written by Patrick J. Furlong)
11. Duel in Paradise (written by Mark Edens and Michael Edens)
12. The Impostor (story by Paul Davids, teleplay by Michael Reaves and Steve Perry)
13. The Hacker (written by Patrick J. Furlong)
14. Overlord's Mystery Woman (written by David Schwartz)
15. The Sands of Amaran (written by Eric Lewald and Andrew Yates)
16. Zone Train (story by David Wise, teleplay by David Wise and Michael Reaves)
17. Breakout (written by Buzz Dixon)
18. When the Cat's Away (written by Mark Edens)
19. Island in the Zone (written by Michael Edens and Mark Edens)
20. The Shuttle Engine (written by R. Patrick Neary)
21. The Mind of Gideon Rorshak (written by Haskell Barkin)
22. Canal Zone (written by Gerry Conway and Carla Conway)
23. The Lair of the Jade Scorpion (written by Kent Butterworth)
24. The Man Who Wouldn't Be King (written by Mark Edens)
25. The Way of the Samurai (written by Michael Reaves and Steve Perry)
26. The Best Fighting Men in the World (written by Frank Dandridge)
27. The Ultimate Solution (written by Patrick Barry)
28. Hometown Hero (written by Francis Moss)
29. In the Belly of the Beast (written by Mark Edens)
30. The Last One Picked (written by Mark Edens)
31. So Shall You Reaper (written by Mark Edens)
32. The Secret of Shadow House (written by Michael Reaves and Steve Perry)
33. Zone of Fear (written by Michael Reaves and Steve Perry)
34. Bandit and the Smokies (written by Mark Edens)
35. Heroes in the Dark (written by Kenneth Kahn)
36. Zone with Big Shoulders (written by Mark Edens)
37. Behemoth (written by Patrick Barry)
38. The Power of the Press (written by Gerry Conway and Carla Conway)
39. Starship Doom (written by Ray Parker)
40. The Electric Zone Rider (written by Mark Edens)
41. An Australian in Paris (written by Mark Edens)
42. The Enemy Within (written by Mike Kirschenbaum)
43. Anti-Matter (written by Brooks Wachtel)
44. The Siege (written by Mark Edens)
45. A Little Zone Music (written by Mark Edens)
46. The Element of Surprise (written by Mark Edens)
47. Seachase (written by Francis Moss)
48. The Right Man for the Job (written by Mark Edens)
49. High and Low (written by Mark Edens and Michael Edens)
50. Profiles in Courage (written by Mark Edens)
51. The Darkness Within (story by Michael Reaves and Steve Perry, teleplay by Carla Conway and Gerry Conway)
52. Power Play (written by Kent Stevenson)
53. Duchess Treat (written by Mark Edens and Michael Edens)
54. Oversight (written by Mark Edens)
55. Assault on the Rock (written by Frank Dandridge)
56. They Zone by Night (written by Mark Edens)
57. Conflict of Duty (written by Cherie Wilkerson)
58. The Final Weapon (written by Ray Parker)
59. The Face of the Enemy (written by Mark Edens)
60. Brother's Keeper (written by Carla Conway and Gerry Conway)
61. Little Darlings (written by Francis Moss)
62. Nightmare on Ice (story by Steven Zak and Jacqueline Zak, teleplay by Mark Edens)
63. Evil Transmissions (written by James Wager)
64. Zone Trap (written by James Wager and Byrd Ehlmann)
65. Countdown (written by James Wager and Scott Koldo)

== Japanese version ==
The suits and some of the vehicles in Spiral Zone originated from a line of action figures produced by Bandai that was sold from 1985 to 1988. Conceptualized by Gundam mecha designers Kunio Okawara and Kazuhisa Kondo, the Special Force Group Spiral Zone series depicted a team of special operations soldiers fighting a war in the early 21st century. The line only had 12 items, organized into Acts. They include: three 1:12 scale six-inch figures with full equipment codenamed Bull Solid, Hyper Boxer, and Sentinel Bear, two Bull Solid cloth uniform and armor sets, two Hyper Boxer cloth uniform and armor sets, two equipment backpacks, two bare human figures, and one vehicle called the Monoseed. The figures had 30 points of articulation.

Non-toy media included a notebook, a novel, and an LP/story compilation released in 1986 by Warner Bros. Records and Pioneer Corporation called a Hyper Image Album. The LP disc in particular contains songs composed by Toshiyuki Watanabe and performed by Tomoko Aran, with the accompanying stories written by Kazunori Itō. He wrote the novel with HEADGEAR colleague Akemi Takada as illustrator. The series' story and other machines, such as a mobile base and special transport for the Monoseeds, were also detailed in Bandai's Model Making Journal.

Bandai had plans to release a fourth action figure (codenamed Fireball) and additional vehicles before the line was cancelled. They include a tank, a small flight pod called the Beaufighter, a radio-controlled assault jeep resembling the Chenowth DPV called the Fat Lynx, a fast-attack vehicle called the Mad Lemming, a bipedal mech, two personal transport backpacks, and the Monoseed Mk II assault cycle, among others. The Monoseed and Monoseed Mk II were the respective basis for the Zone Riders' standard motorcycles and Courage's Rimfire Cannon, while one of the two unreleased backpacks, a monocycle called the Monodrive, was remodeled as Max Jones' Zone Runner backpack.

The unreleased vehicles later appeared in the series' gashapon line, which also had a special Spiral Zone super-deformed board game and other products not developed in 1:12 scale, such as new personal mecha units, weapon packs, and three figures (codenamed Zone Bolt, Eagle Eye, and Zone Acorn).

Because of their extensive detail and high-quality construction, the Japanese Spiral Zone figures are well regarded among toy collectors and often fetch high prices.

== Releases ==
=== Toys ===
Although best known for producing toys of construction vehicles, Tonka licensed the rights to Spiral Zone from Bandai and created a line of seven-inch figures that were later based on the animated series. The toyline, which hit the market in 1986, comprised four of the five original Zone Riders and all five original Black Widows, plus their vehicles, six cloth uniforms, and six equipment sets.

The cancellation of the series, however, left the figures of Zone Riders Anastacia, Tucker, and Franklin, Black Widows Crook and Raw Meat, and a Zone Generator playset out of Tonka's 1988 release. The figures were also highly detailed, but were not as articulated as the Japanese figures. Each figure has a special audio cassette tape.

=== Home video ===
Tonka first released Spiral Zone on VHS in 1987 with two episodes per tape. Only three tapes were produced before the series was cancelled. Tonka has not announced plans to release the series on DVD, but an unofficial DVD set containing all 65 episodes and bonus materials was released in November 2006 by SpiralZone.com, with the cooperation of the show's supervising director, Pierre DeCelles. The site's operator said that DeCelles volunteered for the project by providing the original master tapes of the series, which were converted to DVD. He added that Tonka and parent firm Hasbro never responded to his offers to acquire the rights.

The American Spiral Zone animated series was dubbed into Japanese and aired on the satellite network NHK-BS2 in 1990. The episode order for the Japanese broadcast was substantially altered from the order used in the United States. For example, US episode #1 was aired in Japan as episode #3, but the series' opening theme was left unaltered. The complete Japanese dubbed version of Spiral Zone was released on VHS format in Japan by NHK under their "VOOK" line in 1991 thru 1992.

=== Comics ===
DC Comics released a Spiral Zone four-issue limited series in February 1988. It was written by Michael Fleisher with art by Carmine Infantino.

== Production ==
According to the show's former supervising director Pierre DeCelles, he wanted to get Spiral Zone to go for the fantastic science fiction direction, but the producers and sponsors discouraged him for doing anything too unusual.

== Reception ==
The show's entry in The Encyclopedia of Science Fiction notes that "bleak, reclamation-oriented narrative, post-apocalyptic imagery, and themes of terrorism, mind control, and authoritarianism distinguish it from lighter entries in the era's toy-driven cartoon boom" and "retrospective commentary has generally praised its dark premise, post-apocalyptic atmosphere, and memorable theme music [...], while noting weaknesses in its repetitive episodic plotting and somewhat stereotypical characters".
