= Jinjur =

Character in The Marvelous Land of Oz by L. Frank Baum

General Jinjur
- Oz character
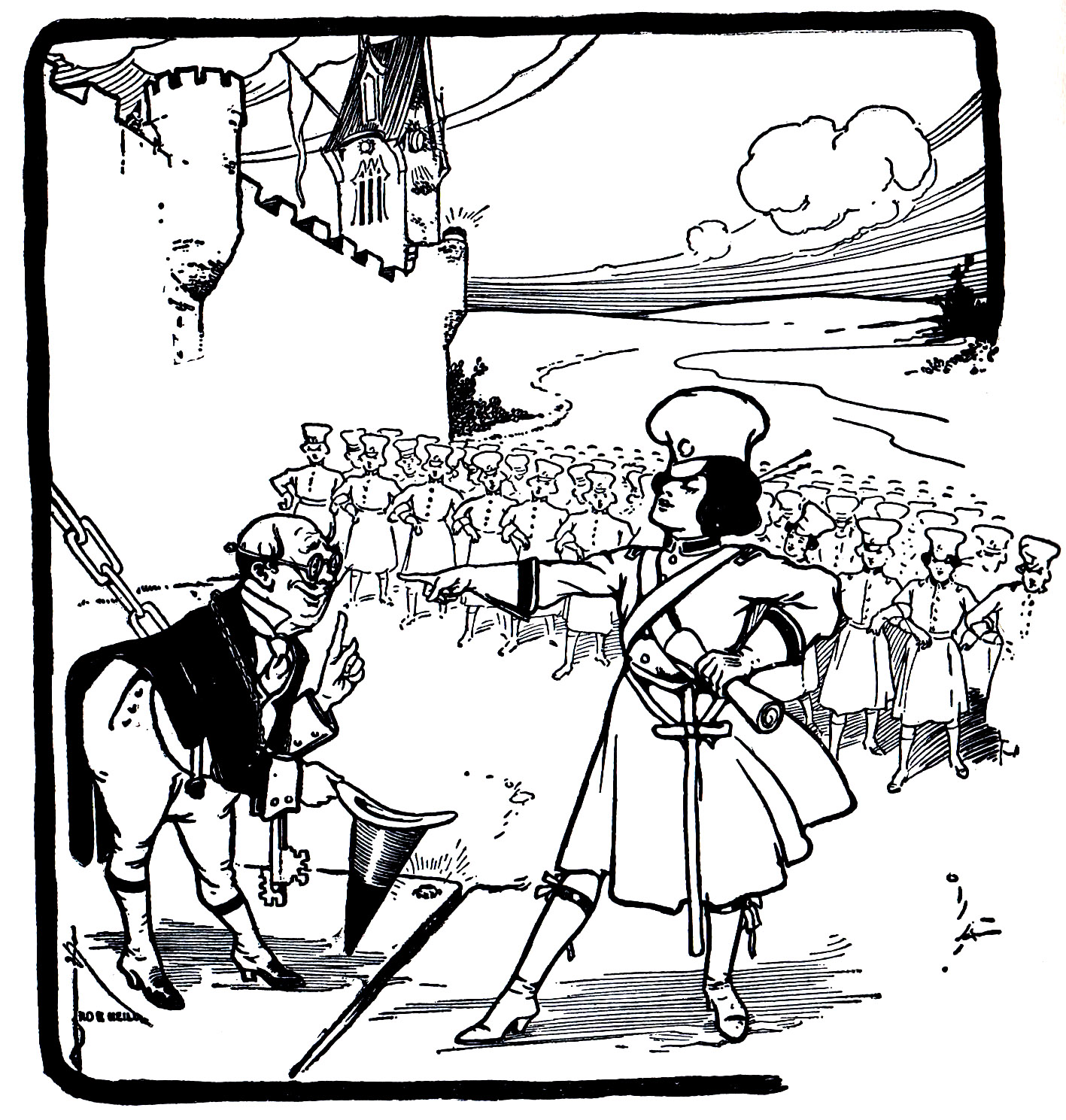
- Art by John R. Neill
- First appearance: The Marvelous Land of Oz (1904)
- Last appearance: Lucky Bucky in Oz (1942)
- Created by: L. Frank Baum

In-universe information
- Species: human
- Gender: female
- Title: General (former)
- Occupation: General, Army of Revolt; later, candy farmer
- Spouse: mentioned but unnamed
- Nationality: Munchkin

General Jinjur is an antagonist in the 1904 novel The Marvelous Land of Oz. She is a character in the Oz books by L. Frank Baum and his successors.

== Biography ==
Jinjur first appears in The Marvelous Land of Oz as a self-appointed general leading an "Army of Revolt"—an all-woman force seeking to end the reign of the Scarecrow and take over the Emerald City. After taking the throne from him, Jinjur pronounces herself queen.

The revolt is a parody of the contemporaneous movement for women's suffrage, which Baum supported (his mother-in-law was prominent suffragist Matilda Joslyn Gage). General Jinjur's followers use both violence (sharp knitting needles) and their feminine privileges to gain advantage: no man will hit a pretty girl, and Jinjur boasts "there is not an ugly face in my entire Army." Yet those same young women are temporarily routed by an incursion of mice. Jinjur's regime assigns Emerald City husbands to domestic tasks thought to be women's work, such as cooking and cleaning; the men quickly get worn out, and eventually their wives are happy to take over those tasks and do them competently again.

Jinjur's name, pronounced as "ginger," implies that she has a rather volatile nature; however, she is not evil, but misguided by her petulant discontent and desire for power. She is also cowardly, and dances on the throne when she sees the field mice. While she works with the witch Mombi, Jinjur is secretly afraid of her, and quickly pledges loyalty to Princess Ozma after she loses the throne to Glinda and her army (which is also made up entirely of female soldiers).

In Ozma of Oz, Jinjur makes a brief appearance as a dairy farmer's wife. She says she is happy and contented, but also reports that her (unseen) husband is nursing a black eye after milking the wrong cow. The Patchwork Girl of Oz reports that Jinjur is a talented painter who helps to restore her old nemesis, the Scarecrow.

In The Tin Woodman of Oz, Jinjur makes her most significant reappearance in the series. She still lives on a farm in the Munchkin Country, but her husband is nowhere to be seen. She is startled at first by the incursion of the Tin Woodman, the Scarecrow, and their companions, who have been transformed into animals by a wicked sorceress Mrs. Yoop. When the situation is explained, she calms down and is helpful and friendly.

== Description ==
Jinjur is illustrated in The Marvelous Land of Oz wearing a feminized version of a military dress uniform of the period before World War I, with a skirt in place of trousers, high boots, a military-style frogged tunic, and a tall shako. Her army, in similar uniforms, looks like a crack drill team or chorus line. In Ozma of Oz she is described as a pretty dairy maid, and Princess Ozma has to look a second time, more closely, to recognize her.

== In other print works ==
In the comic book, Oz, Jinjur is part of Oz's Freedom Fighters. In issue #0, it was revealed that her husband was turned into a jewel by Ruggedo and crushed in his hand.

In Gregory Maguire's fourth Oz novel, Out of Oz, the armies of Munchkinland are led by one "General Jinjuria", apparently a reference to Jinjur.

The Dorothy Must Die supplemental story "The Straw King" pits Jinjur's army against the Winged Monkeys, leading to bloodbath as the Monkeys simply pick up the girls and drop them from a high altitude.

== Portrayals ==
In 1905, Jinjur was a character in the stage play The Woggle-Bug, which loosely followed the novel's plot. Beatrice McKenzie played her in the initial run of this play, which was considered a flop.

Marie Wayne plays Jinjur in the 1914 silent film The Patchwork Girl of Oz, made by Baum's own Oz Film Manufacturing Company. Her fairly minor role diverges from the books, as she is not a military adventurer, but simply a romantic antagonist for the pure-hearted heroine Jesseva.

It is believed that Jinjur appeared in additional silent films between 1908 and 1910, which are now lost.

In the 1960 Shirley Temple's Storybook episode The Land of Oz, Jinjur is supplanted by a male character, Lord General Nikidik, played by Jonathan Winters. Both Nikidik's and Glinda's armies are all male, thus eliminating the "battle of the sexes" theme of the novel.

Caroline Berner plays Jinjur in the 1969 "b-movie" The Wonderful Land of Oz. She has long dark hair, wears a green uniform, and generally acts impertinent while her army acts lackadaisical. Her followers are depicted as stock "rebellious teenager" characters of the time, and their grievances include "homework" and "babysitting". This is the only known film role of actress Berner.

In the Anime series, Ozu no Mahōtsukai, she is depicted as a fiery red-head sporting a tiara, cape and mischievous smile. She seeks to outlaw fun and pleasure for everyone but her own inner circle, and has no higher feminist ideals.

In the cartoon Adventures in the Emerald City, Jinjur has a red-breasted Iroquois. She wears a red uniform.

General Jinjur appears in her self-titled episode of Dorothy and the Wizard of Oz voiced by Kari Wahlgren.

In the 1988 cutout cartoon series W krainie czarnoksiężnika Oza (In the Land of the Wizard of Oz), which adapts The Wonderful Wizard of Oz and The Marvelous Land of Oz, Jinjur (in Polish translation Dendera) is merged with character of Jellia Jamb. She is young woman with blue hair. Before became general of Army of Revolt, she served as one of servant of Wizard under name of "Jellia". After the Scarecrow became ruler of Emerald City, she change name to Jinjur. She voiced by Ewa Ziętek.

In the Disney film Return to Oz (1985), Jinjur appears in a non-speaking role in a crowd scene, played by an unknown actress.

Preceded by Scarecrow	Ruler of the Emerald City	Succeeded by Ozma
