= The Tin Woodman of Oz =

Book by L. Frank Baum

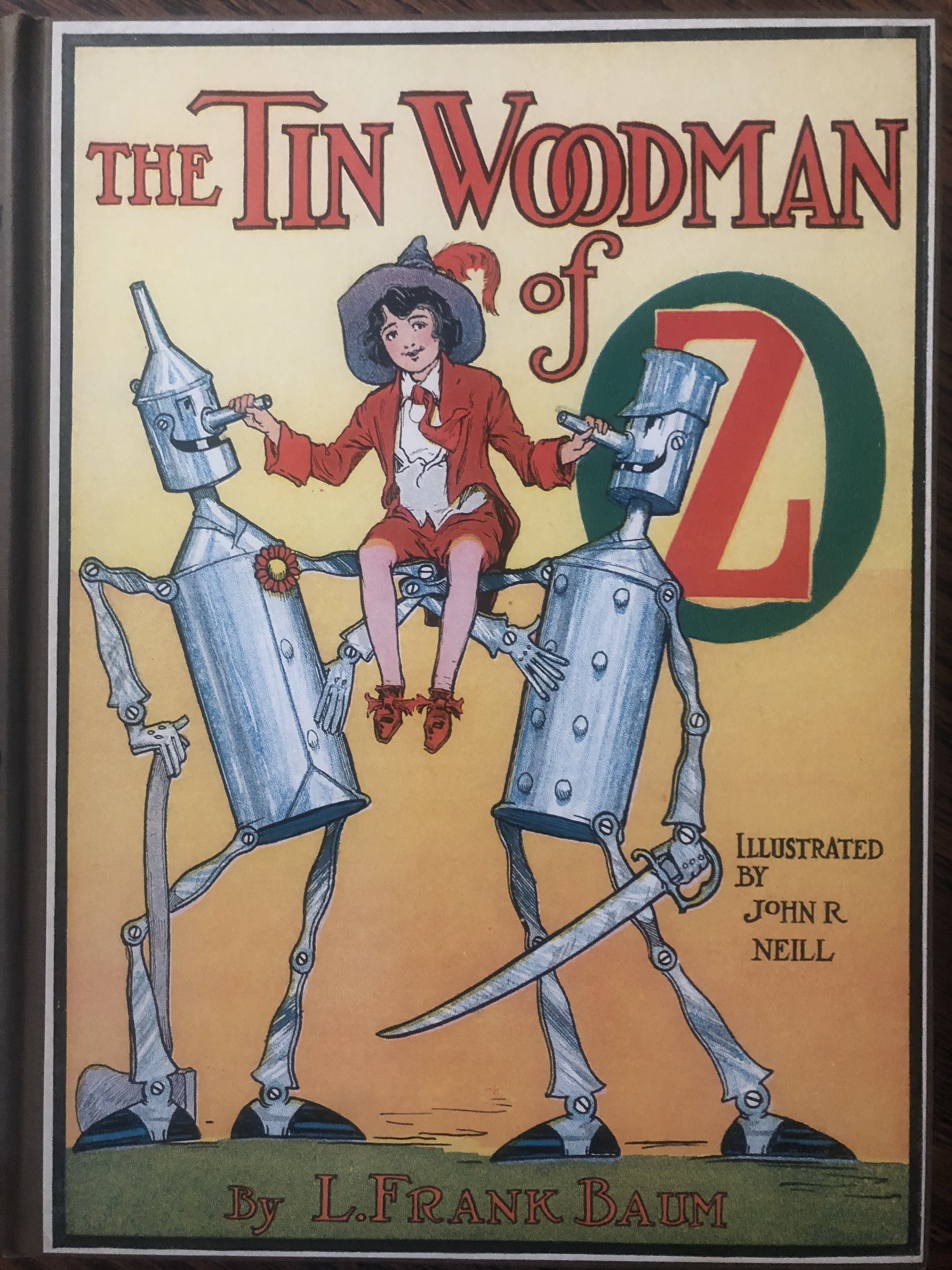
- First edition cover
- Author: L. Frank Baum
- Cover artist: John R. Neill
- Language: English
- Series: The Oz books
- Genre: Children's novel
- Publication date: 1918
- Publication place: United States
- Media type: Print
- Preceded by: The Lost Princess of Oz
- Followed by: The Magic of Oz

The Tin Woodman of Oz: A Faithful Story of the Astonishing Adventure Undertaken by the Tin Woodman, Assisted by Woot the Wanderer, the Scarecrow of Oz, and Polychrome, the Rainbow's Daughter is the twelfth book in the Oz series written by L. Frank Baum and was originally published on May 13, 1918. The Tin Woodman is reunited with his Munchkin sweetheart Nimmie Amee from the days when he was flesh and blood. This was a backstory from Baum's 1900 novel, The Wonderful Wizard of Oz. It was followed by The Magic of Oz (1919).

The Tin Woodman of Oz was the last book in the series to be published during Baum's lifetime. It was dedicated to Baum's grandson, Frank Alden Baum.

== Plot summary ==
The Tin Woodman and the Scarecrow are regaling each other with tales at the Woodman's palace in the Winkie Country when a Gillikin boy named Woot wanders in. After he is fed and rested, Woot asks the Woodman how he came to be made of tin.

He relates how the Wicked Witch of the East enchanted his axe and caused him to chop his body parts off limb by limb, because he was in love with her ward, Nimmie Amee. Each chopped limb was replaced by the tinsmith Ku-Klip with a counterpart made of tin. Without a heart, the Tin Woodman felt he could no longer love Nimmie Amee and he left her. Woot suggests that his new heart may have made him kind, but it did not make him loving, or he would have returned to Nimmie Amee. This shames the Tin Woodman and inspires him to journey to the Munchkin Country and find her.

The Tin Woodman, the Scarecrow, and Woot journey into the Gillikin Country and encounter the inflatable Loons of Loonville, whom they escape by popping several of them. They descend into Yoop Valley, where the giantess Mrs. Yoop dwells, who transforms the travelers into animals for her amusement, just as she has already done to Polychrome, the Rainbow's Daughter. The group escapes, still in their animal forms.

They arrive at the farm of Jinjur, who renews her acquaintance with them and sends to the Emerald City for help. Dorothy and Ozma arrive and Ozma restores the travelers to their rightful forms.

The group resumes their quest and comes upon the spot where the Tin Woodman had rusted and find another tin man there. After they oil his joints, he identifies himself as Captain Fyter, a soldier who courted Nimmie Amee after the Woodman had left her. The Wicked Witch of the East had made Fyter's sword do what the Woodman's axe had done—cut off his limbs, which Ku-Klip replaced with tin limbs. He does not have a heart either, but this does not bother him. However, he can rust, which he did one day during a rainstorm. Both tin men now seek the heart of Nimmie Amee, agreeing to let her choose between them.

The five come to the dwelling of the tinsmith Ku-Klip, where the Tin Woodman talks to himself—that is, to the head of the man (Nick Chopper) he once was. The Tin Woodman and the Tin Soldier also find a barrel of assorted body parts that once belonged to each of them, but some, like Captain Fyter's head, are conspicuously missing. Ku-Klip reveals that he used Fyter's head and many body parts from each of them (which never decayed) to create an assistant whom he named Chopfyt. Chopfyt complained about missing an arm until Ku-Klip made him a tin one, and Chopfyt departed for the east.

The companions leave Ku-Klip and continue east themselves to find Nimmie Amee near Mount Munch. At its foot is a cottage where a rabbit tells them Nimmie Amee now lives happily. The Tin Woodman and the Tin Soldier find that Nimmie Amee is now married to Chopfyt. She refuses to leave her domestic life, even to become Empress of the Winkies. The four travelers return to the Emerald City and relate their adventures.

== Context and reception ==
The Tin Woodman of Oz provides backstory for Oz itself; it was not always a fairyland, and became one by being enchanted by the Fairy Queen Lurline, who left a fairy behind to rule it. In Glinda of Oz Ozma says that she herself was that fairy, though in The Marvelous Land of Oz we are told of her restoration to a throne long held by her ancestors.

In any event, this novel marks a clear maturation of Ozma's character, now said to appear significantly older than Dorothy (in Ozma of Oz they appeared the same age) and a fairy working her own innate magic.

Baum's Oz books had entered a trend of declining sales after 1910. The Tin Woodman of Oz reversed this trend; its first-year sales of 18,600 were enough to make it a "bestselling success." Significantly, the sales of earlier Oz titles also rebounded from previous declines, many selling 3000 copies that year, and two, The Marvelous Land of Oz (1904) and the previous year's The Lost Princess of Oz (1917), selling 4000 copies. Baum earned $6,742.52 from his Oz books that year. (In 1918, the average annual salary of a clerical worker was $940.) Even Baum's non-Oz-related early works were affected by the upsurge: John Dough and the Cherub (1906) sold 1,562 copies in 1918.

The reason for this reversal of fortune is harder to specify. The psychological shock of the trench-warfare carnage of World War I may have inspired a wave of nostalgia for a simpler time, with Baum's books representing a lost "age of innocence".

A new edition of the book was illustrated by Dale Ulrey in 1955. She illustrated a new edition of The Wizard of Oz for Reilly & Lee the following year, but sales did not warrant her continuing to provide new illustrations.

== See also ==
The Oz books
Previous book: The Lost Princess of Oz	The Tin Woodman of Oz; 1918	Next book: The Magic of Oz
