= Terrence McDonnell =

American screenwriter

- Occupations: Television screenwriter and producer
- Years active: 1976–present

Terrence McDonnell is an American television screenwriter and producer, best known for his collaboration with Jim Carlson in the first Battlestar Galactica series. The two of them also wrote the 1988 animated feature film Pound Puppies and the Legend of Big Paw.

== Screenwriting credits ==
=== Television ===
- series head writer denoted in bold
- The Six Million Dollar Man (1973, 1978)
- Gemini Man (1976)
- The Life and Times of Grizzly Adams (1978)
- CHiPs (1978)
- The Bionic Woman (1978)
- Battlestar Galactica (1978)
- Magnum, P.I. (1981)
- The Rousters (1984)
- **Kidd Video** (1984)
- The Love Boat (1984)
- Riptide (1985)
- **M.A.S.K.** (1985): season 1 head writer
- The Mouse and the Motorcycle (1986)
- Danger Bay (1987)
- **Spiral Zone** (1987)
- Good Morning, Miss Bliss (1989)
- Let’s Make a Deal (1990)
- The New Adventures of He-Man (1990)
- Beetlejuice (1991)
- James Bond Jr. (1991)
- Jeopardy! (1991)
- Goof Troop (1992)
- X-Men (1992)
- Candid Camera (1992)
- Exosquad (1993)
- Quicksilver (1994)
- You Don't Know Jack (2001)
- 1 vs. 100 (2006-2007, 2010-2011)

=== Films ===
- Dorothy Meets Ozma of Oz (1987)
- Pound Puppies and the Legend of Big Paw (1988)
