= M.A.S.K. (TV series) =

1985–1986 animated television series, part of the M.A.S.K. media franchise

- Genre: Action-adventure; Science fiction
- Developed by: Terrence McDonnell (season 1); Gary Warne (season 1); Jack Olesker (season 2)
- Directed by: Bruno Bianchi (season 1); Bernard Deyriès (season 1); Michael Maliani (season 2)
- Voices of: Doug Stone; Brian George; Mark Halloran; Brendan McKane; Graeme McKenna; Sharon Noble; Brennan Thicke
- Composers: Shuki Levy; Haim Saban
- Countries of origin: United States; Canada; France
- Original language: English
- No. of seasons: 2
- No. of episodes: 75

Production
- Executive producers: Andy Heyward; Tetsuo Katayama
- Producers: Jean Chalopin; Denis Heroux (season 1); Susan Cavan (season 1)
- Cinematography: Masayoshi Miyakojima
- Running time: 22 mins
- Production companies: DIC Audiovisuel; ICC TV Productions

Original release
- Network: Syndication (United States); TF1 (France)
- Release: 30 September 1985 – 26 November 1986

Related
- Vor-Tech

M.A.S.K. is a 1985 science fiction animated television series produced by DIC Audiovisuel and ICC TV Productions, Ltd. and distributed in the US by LBS Communications. The series was based on the M.A.S.K. action figures produced by Kenner Products (acquired by Hasbro in 1991). It was animated in Japan by Ashi Productions, Studio World and K.K. DiC Asia (later known as K.K. C&D Asia).

== Overview ==
M.A.S.K. (an acronym for "Mobile Armored Strike Kommand") is a special task force led by Matt Trakker, who operate transforming armored vehicles in their ongoing battle against the criminal organization V.E.N.O.M. (an acronym for Vicious Evil Network Of Mayhem) with an emphasis on superpowered helmets (called "masks") worn by the characters of both factions. The background is that Matt's former business partner Miles Mayhem betrayed him, killed Matt's brother Andy Trakker, and stole some of the masks which he used to form V.E.N.O.M. and distribute to his minions. Matt formed M.A.S.K. which consists of Hondo MacLean, Dusty Hayes, Bruce Sato, Alec Sector, Jacques LaFleur, Nevada Rushmore, Julio Lopez, Calhoun Burns, Buddie Hawks, Ace Riker, and Gloria Baker.

V.E.N.O.M.'s primary goal is obtaining money through either robbery, extortion, counterfeiting, kidnapping, or attempting to steal historical artifacts as he leads Cliff Dagger, Sly Rax, Vanessa Warfield, Bruno Sheppard, Floyd Malloy, and Nash Gorey into committing these crimes. M.A.S.K. always foils their plans.

The second season details some racing episodes that involved M.A.S.K. and V.E.N.O.M. competing in different races as M.A.S.K. prevents V.E.N.O.M. from causing trouble. While M.A.S.K. gained Boris Bushkin and Ali Bombay as new members, V.E.N.O.M. gained Lester Sludge and Miles' brother Maximus as new members.

Each episode ends with a safety tip told by either someone from M.A.S.K. or V.E.N.O.M.

== Cast ==
- Doug Stone – Matt Trakker, Hondo MacLean, Dusty Hayes, Bruce Sato, Nash Gorey, Bruno Sheppard, Boris Bushkin, Maximus Mayhem
- Brendan McKane – Miles Mayhem, Alex Sector, Floyd Malloy, Jacques LaFleur, Nevada Rushmore
- Graeme McKenna – T-Bob, Brad Turner, Julio Lopez, Calhoun Burns
- Mark Halloran – Sly Rax, Buddie Hawks, Cliff Dagger, Ace Riker, Duane Kennedy
- Sharon Noble – M.A.S.K. Computer, Gloria Baker, Vanessa Warfield
- Brian George – Lester Sludge, Ali Bombay
- Brennan Thicke – Scott Trakker

== Crew ==
=== Season 1 (1985) ===
- Story editors: Terrence McDonnell and Gary Warne
- Writers: Jina Bacarr, Rod Baker, Creighton Barnes, Patrick Barry, Jack Bornoff, Del Bruckman, Barbara Chain, Kerry Ehrin, Herb Engelhardt, Mel Gilden, Ralph Goodman, David Gottlieb, Barbara Hambly, Trevor Meldal-Johnsen, Fred Ladd, Chuck Lorre, Ali Matheson, R. Patrick Neary, Dianne Nezgoda, Jack Olesker, Glen Olson, Alfred A. Pegal, Jessica Radcliff, Ginger Roth, Jeffrey Scott, Chris Weber & Karen Willson, S. S. Wilson, Erica Byrne
- Directors: Bruno Bianchi and Bernard Deyries

=== Season 2 (1986) ===
- Story editor: Jack Olesker
- Writers: Ray Dryden, Jack Olesker
- Director: Michael Maliani
- Animation production: Ashi Productions (credited as Ashi Pro.), Studio World (only the season two end credits gave credit to these studios on screen)

== Episodes ==
A total of 75 syndicated episodes over two seasons were broadcast from September 1985 to November 1986. The first season consisted of 65 episodes. The second season, whose theme deemphasized crimefighting in favor of auto racing, lasted only ten episodes.

=== Season 1 (1985) ===
No.	Title	Original release date
1	"The Deathstone"	30 September 1985
V.E.N.O.M. members Miles Mayhem, Cliff Dagger, and Sly Rax steal a strange meteorite with healing powers using Switchblade disguised as a UFO. Safety tip: Matt, Scott, and Bob advise the viewers to make sure they look both ways before going into the street to retrieve a ball.
2	"The Star Chariot"	1 October 1985
Miles Mayhem leads Cliff Dagger, Sly Rax, and Vanessa Warfield into stealing a mystical arrowhead that is rumored to show the way to an alien spacecraft buried in the desert. Safety tip: When Scott comes across a stray dog, Alex and T-Bob advise him not to pet it.
3	"The Book of Power"	2 October 1985
Miles Mayhem leads Cliff Dagger and Sly Rax into stealing an ancient book which holds the secrets of a mythological city of riches. Safety tip: When in the car, Matt advises Scott to always put on his seatbelt.
4	"Highway to Terror"	3 October 1985
M.A.S.K. tries to retrieve a stash of military plutonium that Miles Mayhem, Cliff Dagger, Sly Rax, Vanessa Warfield, and the generic V.E.N.O.M. henchmen plan to use to power an earthquake machine. Safety tip: When at a body of water, Matt and Scott tell T-Bob to check its depth before diving in.
5	"Video VENOM"	4 October 1985
Miles Mayhem, Cliff Dagger, Sly Rax, and Vanessa Warfield hypnotize innocent people through their television sets to hijack a powerful laser cannon and threaten to use it to attack a Texas oil refinery if not paid a hefty ransom. Safety tip: When making use of a ladder, Scott recalls what his father told him about making sure its base is level before climbing up it.
6	"Dinosaur Boy"	7 October 1985
Miles Mayhem, Cliff Dagger, Sly Rax, and Vanessa Warfield abduct a strange lizard creature whose antibodies can prolong human life. Safety tip: Matt and Scott mention that they should always cross the streets where a sidewalk is as it nearly proved fatal to two boys who did not use one.
7	"The Ultimate Weapon"	8 October 1985
Miles Mayhem, Cliff Dagger, and Sly Rax obtain a device that jams the control systems of MASK's vehicles, rendering their opposition immobile. Safety tip: Matt advises Scott not to go hitchhiking as he talks his friend Jeff out of doing it when en route to a soccer game.
8	"The Roteks"	9 October 1985
Miles Mayhem, Cliff Dagger, and Sly Rax steal a swarm of metal-eating bugs called Roteks that are secretly being developed by the military. Safety tip: T-Bob learns that it is important to wear safety goggles when handling tools and Matt is glad that Scott remembered.
9	"The Oz Effect"	10 October 1985
Miles Mayhem, Cliff Dagger, Sly Rax, and the V.E.N.O.M. henchmen use a strange vortex machine to abduct a village of Australian aborigines and force them as slaves to mine valuable crystal. Safety tip: Matt and Scott point out the horrors of sticking a fork into a toaster that will lead to someone getting electrocuted. They are lucky that T-Bob is not a human when he did it.
10	"Death from the Sky"	11 October 1985
Miles Mayhem, Cliff Dagger, Sly Rax, Vanessa Warfield, and the V.E.N.O.M. henchmen use a tractor beam to steer a meteor to Earth, which threatens to destroy a major city. Safety tip: Matt and Buddy remind Scott to make sure he rides his bicycle on the right side of the street.
11	"The Magma Mole"	14 October 1985
Miles Mayhem, Cliff Dagger, Sly Rax, Vanessa Warfield, and the V.E.N.O.M. henchmen use a mole machine to drill into the Earth, which threatens Tokyo with devastating floods and an eruption of Mount Fuji. Safety tip: Before he dives into a saltwater lake, Scott asks his father to check its depths for him.
12	"Solaria Park"	15 October 1985
Miles Mayhem, Cliff Dagger, Sly Rax, and Vanessa Warfield hide a heat ray weapon in an amusement park. Safety Tip: Before working on a car, Scott tells his father that he has the handbreak set to park and all the wheels blocked off.
13	"The Creeping Terror"	16 October 1985
Miles Mayhem, Cliff Dagger, Sly Rax, and Vanessa Warfield unleash a horde of giant caterpillars to destroy a South American jungle in hopes of finding a lost Mayan temple. Safety Tip: Matt advises Scott not to ride on his bicycle when T-Top is sitting on the handlebars.
14	"Assault on Liberty"	17 October 1985
Miles Mayhem, Cliff Dagger, Sly Rax, and Vanessa Warfield steal the Statue of Liberty during a magic show and holds it for ransom. Duane Kennedy of the Peaceful Nations Alliance ask Matt Trakker and M.A.S.K. to help rescue it. Safety tip: Matt advises Scott to wear bright clothes when crossing the street at night.
15	"The Sceptre of Rajim"	18 October 1985
Miles Mayhem, Cliff Dagger, Sly Rax, and Vanessa Warfield steal a mystical scepter from an Indian city whose inhabitants hold the M.A.S.K. team hostage until its return. Matt Trakker must work alone to get it back. Safety tip: Following a tennis game, Matt advises Scott and T-Bob not to drink from unlabeled bottles.
16	"The Golden Goddess"	21 October 1985
Miles Mayhem, Cliff Dagger, Sly Rax, and Vanessa Warfield steal golden relics from ancient temples in Singapore, using a special gas that liquefies gold and smuggling it by pumping it secretly through a pipeline. Safety tip: Matt advises Scott not to wear his headphones when riding on a bicycle or a scooter.
17	"Mystery of the Rings"	22 October 1985
Miles Mayhem, Cliff Dagger, Sly Rax, and Vanessa Warfield go to Sunhenge with three mystic rings that will point the way to a wealth of ancient treasure. Safety tip: Scott and T-Bob advise a kid not to ride his skateboard on the street.
18	"Bad Vibrations"	23 October 1985
Upon being hired by a former orphan-turned-bitter millionaire Julian Fong, Miles Mayhem, Cliff Dagger, and Sly Rax threaten to destroy three buildings in Hong Kong with a sonic weapon. Matt discovers that the three buildings in question were the ones that Fong had been fired from in his earlier career. Safety top: Matt is lucky he installed a smoke detector when Scott leaves his equipment on when putting a new circuit board in T-Bob.
19	"Ghost Bomb"	24 October 1985
Miles Mayhem, Cliff Dagger, Sly Rax, and Vanessa Warfield plot to destroy the Panama Canal with a captured nuclear submarine controlled by a computer named Brian the Brain unless V.E.N.O.M.'s demands are met. Safety tip: When T-Bob gets a flat tire leaving Scott stuck on a highway, Scott tells T-Bob that he knows his home phone number and address in case of any emergencies.
20	"Cold Fever"	25 October 1985
During a trip to Alaska, Bruce Sato falls ill from a terrible virus. M.A.S.K. finds out that Miles Mayhem, Cliff Dagger, and Sly Rax are responsible for the virus being melted from its ice and that V.E.N.O.M. has the only cure which they are willing to give to the sick people for the right price. Safety tip: Scott reminds T-Bob not to play with matches.
21	"Mardi Gras Mystery"	28 October 1985
The M.A.S.K. team enjoys Mardi Gras, but they soon find Miles Mayhem, Cliff Dagger, Sly Rax, and Vanessa Warfield trying to steal the formula for a superfuel from the distilled sap harvested from the "fire trees" in the swamps of Louisiana. Safety tip: When an ambulance drives down the street, Matt asks Scott and T-Bob if they know how to get help in the event of an emergency. They do by using the phone and also making use of the telephone operator.
22	"The Secret of Life"	29 October 1985
Using Sly Rax disguised as a mummy, Miles Mayhem and Vanessa Warfield try to obtain an Ancient Egyptian tablet from King Tut's tomb which may contain "the secret of life". Safety tip: Matt stops Scott from going through a garbage container and "checking out some junk" inside it.
23	"Vanishing Point"	30 October 1985
Miles Mayhem, Cliff Dagger, Sly Rax, Vanessa Warfield, and the V.E.N.O.M. henchmen hijack planes by setting up a fake airport, jamming radars and confusing pilots to land there, in order to capture an experimental supersonic jet. Safety tip: Scott tells T-Bob that he cannot carry more than he can handle when trying to save time by carrying a lot of logs.
24	"Counter-Clockwise Caper"	31 October 1985
Miles Mayhem, Cliff Dagger, Sly Rax, and Vanessa Warfield conduct heists of Las Vegas casinos with the help of a machine that makes everything go backwards. Safety tip: After swimming in the pool at the Trakker mansion, Scott is complimented by Matt and Gloria over putting on extra sunscreen.
25	"The Plant Show"	1 November 1985
As Matt Trakker, Scott Trakker, and T-Bob are watching Brad Turner's concert in Los Angeles, Miles Mayhem, Sly Rax, and Vanessa Warfield threaten to cover Los Angeles with mutated kudzu vines unless California pays a hefty ransom. Safety tip: Scott reminds T-Bob that he should not get an electric tool wet after he gets electrocuted.
26	"Secret of the Andes"	4 November 1985
M.A.S.K. must protect a revived Incan priest, who has been frozen in ice found in the Andes Mountains, from Miles Mayhem, Cliff Dagger, Sly Rax, and Vanessa Warfield. V.E.N.O.M. suspects that the Incan priest may know the secret location of El Dorado. Safety tip: When T-Bob's new household robot blows a fuse in the Trakker mansion, Matt informs Scott that T-Bob's action could have started a fire as Scott plans not to let that happen again.
27	"Panda Power"	5 November 1985
Miles Mayhem, Cliff Dagger, Sly Rax, and Vanessa Warfield abduct endangered giant pandas and a sculptor working on a giant panda statue from China and bring them to Easter Island. M.A.S.K. must rescue them before they can fight V.E.N.O.M. Safety tip: At the time when he was building a treehouse with T-Bob, Scott tells a young boy the pitfalls of running with sticks.
28	"Blackout"	6 November 1985
Miles Mayhem, Cliff Dagger, Sly Rax, and Vanessa Warfield have a new vehicle that they stole called Blackout which is capable of draining power supplies from Japan. Safety tip: Scott warns two kids that they should not ride on the same one-person bicycle. As a humorous part, T-Bob learns that today is Saturday despite going on a "Sunday Drive".
29	"A Matter of Gravity"	7 November 1985
Using a new gravity weapon, Miles Mayhem, Cliff Dagger, Vanessa Warfield, and the V.E.N.O.M. henchmen plan to rob the Philadelphia mint. "Firecracker" is destroyed in a battle with V.E.N.O.M. and Hondo gets a new replacement vehicle called "Hurricane" which was called "Nightstalker" in this episode. Safety tip: Scott Trakker catches T-Bob trying to reach his hand down a garbage disposal and cuts its power before T-Bob can lose its hand.
30	"The Lost Riches of Rio"	8 November 1985
Miles Mayhem, Cliff Dagger, Sly Rax, and Vanessa Warfield steal a worthless painting. M.A.S.K. learns that it contains a secret map to lost Nazi treasure that is somewhere in the Sugarloaf Mountain. Safety tip: While playing hide and seek with Scott, T-Bob climbs into an empty refrigerator. Finding T-Bob inside, Scott states that T-Bob is lucky he cannot breathe as going into empty refrigerators can have the threat of suffocation.
31	"Deadly Blue Slime"	11 November 1985
M.A.S.K. goes to Africa to stop a botched experiment that has created a deadly blue slime from remnants of a rare blue algae and snow leopard DNA that consumes everything in its path. Hearing about it, Miles Mayhem, Cliff Dagger, and Sly Rax plan to get the slime under V.E.N.O.M.'s control. Safety tip: Matt reminds Scott and T-Bob to stick with the buddy system when on a raft in the middle of a lake.
32	"The Currency of Conspiracy"	12 November 1985
In the Swiss Alps, M.A.S.K. must stop Miles Mayhem, Cliff Dagger, Sly Rax, and Vanessa Warfield from using a virus that eats the ink off printed money, rendering the bills worthless at the behest of a corrupt former finance minister named Baron Fritz Von Hauser. Safety tip: T-Bob learns to check the safety of the ice before engaging in ice skating.
33	"Caesar's Sword"	13 November 1985
Sly Rax poses as the Ghost of Julius Caesar to scare off a team of archaeologists who have uncovered Caesar's Sword of Victory as Miles Mayhem plans to claim the Sword of Victory for V.E.N.O.M.'s use. Safety tip: Scott reminds T-Bob to not do a repeat of when he nearly stuck his hand into a garbage disposal.
34	"Peril in Paris"	14 November 1985
Buddie Hawks disguises himself as Cliff Dagger in order to infiltrate V.E.N.O.M.'s secret base in Paris. There, he uncovers Miles Mayhem's plan to find a Nazi doomsday machine and its trigger from World War II so that he, Sly Rax, and Vanessa Warfield can have V.E.N.O.M. make use of it. Safety tip: While working on T-Bob, Scott accidentally causes a fire in the laboratory. He is lucky that he has the telephone number of the fire department. Note: On the Region 2 DVDs, this episode is titled "Peril Under Paris".
35	"In Dutch"	15 November 1985
A millionaire madman hires Miles Mayhem, Sly Rax, and Vanessa Warfield to steal a machine that would destroy the flood dikes in the Netherlands if their parliament does not allow him a political position. Safety tip: As Matt and Scott play tennis, T-Bob jumps off a roof after seeing a stunt performance on TV while giving the trademark Tarzan yell. Matt and Scott tell T-Bob to leave stunts like that to the stunt performers.
36	"The Lippizaner Mystery"	18 November 1985
Miles Mayhem, Cliff Dagger, Sly Rax, and Vanessa Warfield steal the famous Lipizzaner Stallions where the Emir of Amrah plans to purchase them for $4 million. M.A.S.K. team member Dusty Hayes foils their heist. Safety tip: Dusty tells Scott to let a horse know of his position when walking around one as T-Bob learns of that advice in the hard way.
37	"The Sacred Rock"	19 November 1985
Using a hologram of floating rocks, Miles Mayhem, Cliff Dagger, and Sly Rax frighten a tribe of Australian aborigines who believe their god "Mimi" is angry with them. This is part of a plot by V.E.N.O.M. to get the aborigines to tell them where Mimi's secret treasure is. When T-Bob makes an appearance, the tribe thinks he is their deity. Safety tip: When T-Bob accidentally breaks open a jar of pills, Matt reminds him that medicine cabinets can be dangerous to anyone.
38	"Curse of Solomon's Gorge"	20 November 1985
M.A.S.K. goes to Africa when Sly Rax has discovered the opening in a gorge to King Solomon's treasures as Miles Mayhem, Cliff Dagger, and Vanessa Warfield plan to make off with it. Safety tip: When a reel-to-reel tape recorder was found still running, Matt reminds T-Bob to turn off all the appliances before leaving the house.
39	"Green Nightmare"	21 November 1985
Vanessa Warfield sabotages Matt Trakker's private jet which crashes in the jungles of New Guinea, while returning a priceless gem his father was entrusted with by a tribe leader named Warago. The rest of the M.A.S.K. team goes to rescue them before Miles Mayhem and Sly Rax can get to him. Safety tip: Warago tells Scott Trakker the horrors of eating poisonous strawberries.
40	"Eyes of the Skull"	22 November 1985
Miles Mayhem uses an ancient "crystal skull" that allows x-ray like vision to see through Matt Trakker's mask and discover his identity. Mayhem then has Cliff Dagger and Sly Rax kidnap Scott Trakker for ransom. Safety tip: When T-Bob notices someone sneaking around at night, Scott calls the police. Upon learning that a flat tire was being fixed, Scott notes that it never hurts to call the police in the event someone is on property for any type of reason.
41	"Stop Motion"	25 November 1985
Miles Mayhem, Cliff Dagger, Sly Rax, and Vanessa Warfield obtain an EMP bomb and threaten to loot bank vaults across the country by knocking out all electronics for miles around. Safety tip: Scott learns the horrors of playing around with fire alarms.
42	"The Artemis Enigma"	26 November 1985
Miles Mayhem, Cliff Dagger, Sly Rax, and Vanessa Warfield plan to steal a sacred horn from a group of monks that is rumored to detect gold. Safety tip: At the time when T-Bob is celebrating his birthday party, Scott tells a boy about the horrors of playing with fire.
43	"The Chinese Scorpion"	27 November 1985
V.E.N.O.M. agent Bruno Sheppard disguises "Stinger" as a giant iron scorpion and kidnaps an archaeologist who knows the location of buried treasure inside the Great Wall of China which Miles Mayhem wants to obtain. Safety tip: T-Bob nearly gets struck by a truck when he wears his headphones outside.
44	"Riddle of the Raven Master"	28 November 1985
Vanessa Warfield uses her trained ravens to steal London's crown jewels. As a diversion, Sly Rax plants a bomb inside Big Ben. Scott and T-Bob meet the Ravens of the Tower of London. Safety tip: As Matt is cooking in a log cabin, T-Bob learns the hardway on the horrors of touching hot pans on the stove.
45	"The Spectre of Captain Kidd"	29 November 1985
M.A.S.K. must foil a plot by Miles Mayhem, Cliff Dagger, Vanessa Warfield, and Floyd Malloy to get their hands on the lost booty of the pirate Captain Kidd. Safety tip: At the beach, Scott tells a boy and a girl the pitfalls of playing with glass.
46	"The Secret of the Stones"	2 December 1985
Miles Mayhem, Cliff Dagger, Sly Rax, and Vanessa Warfield steal a strange stone that makes objects weightless. Safety tip: T-Bob learns from Scott the horrors of leaving toys lying around.
47	"The Lost Fleet"	3 December 1985
M.A.S.K. tries to stop Miles Mayhem, Cliff Dagger, Sly Rax, and Nash Gorey, who go to Iceland in search of a legendary "golden" fleet. Safety tip: While retrieving a kite from the roof of the Trakker mansion, Scott reminds T-Bob to hold the ladder he is using.
48	"Quest of the Canyon"	4 December 1985
M.A.S.K. goes to Carlsbad Caverns where Miles Mayhem, Cliff Dagger, Sly Rax, and Bruno Sheppard plan to steal the lost treasure of legendary gunman Jesse James. Safety tip: Matt warns Scott the pitfalls of reading without the proper lighting.
49	"Follow the Rainbow"	5 December 1985
Miles Mayhem, Cliff Dagger, Sly Rax, and Vanessa Warfield go to Ireland to find the treasure of Brian Boru at the end of the rainbow. Safety tip: Matt tells Scott the pitfalls of adding lighter fluid to a barbecue fire where adding lighter fluid might cause an explosion.
50	"The Everglades Oddity"	6 December 1985
Matt Trakker is bitten by a venomous snake. While he recovers, Alex Sector must lead the M.A.S.K. team to stop Miles Mayhem's plan of stealing the Space Shuttle with the help of Cliff Dagger, Sly Rax, and Vanessa Warfield. Safety tip: Scott tells T-Bob the pitfalls of running around a swimming pool.
51	"Dragonfire"	9 December 1985
Miles Mayhem, Sly Rax, Bruno Sheppard, and Floyd Malloy go to Borneo to seek a lost temple. When they find it, they unleash the temple's monitor lizard guardians against M.A.S.K. Safety tip': Scott tells T-Bob the pitfalls of hiding under a tree during a thunderstorm.
52	"The Royal Cape Caper"	10 December 1985
Miles Mayhem, Vanessa Warfield, and Floyd Malloy steal Kamehameha's cape and helmet, then mass produce replicas thanks to Floyd's forgery skills and sell them as expensive fakes. Safety tip: Scott tells a boy, who is his neighbor, about the horrors of sticking their hand into a running lawnmower.
53	"Patchwork Puzzle"	11 December 1985
Miles Mayhem, Sly Rax, Floyd Malloy, and Nash Gorey steal a Civil War-era quilt that contains a secret message to finding buried treasure near the Washington Monument in Washington, D.C. Safety tip: Matt teaches Scott how to use his scout pen knife safely.
54	"Fog on Boulder Hill"	12 December 1985
Miles Mayhem, Cliff Dagger, Sly Rax, Vanessa Warfield, and Nash Gorey kidnap an elderly retired teacher named Clara Simpson who is unknowingly hiding $20 bill printing plates and was also a former babysitter of Scott. V.E.N.O.M. wants the plates so they can make counterfeit money, but they have already been stolen by a former Bureau of Engraving and Printing employee named Ramsey Pugh. Safety tip: During a thunderstorm, Matt reminds Scott and T-Bob to have a flashlight ready if the power goes off and to make sure it has working batteries.
55	"Plunder of Glowworm Grotto"	13 December 1985
M.A.S.K. member Julio Lopez goes to New Zealand to help a local tribe preserve their land. There, he discovers a V.E.N.O.M. plot by Miles Mayhem, Sly Rax, and Floyd Malloy to steal pearls from giant clams that live in the ocean. Safety tip: After T-Bob accidentally lights a match when the gas is on in the kitchen and causes an explosion, Scott tells him to always notify an adult.
56	"Stone Trees"	16 December 1985
M.A.S.K. member Jacques LaFleur finds a stone tree inscribed with strange symbols. Miles Mayhem, Cliff Dagger, Bruno Sheppard, and Nash Gorey steal the tree in the hopes that it will lead them to a golden Indian totem. Safety tip: When making masks, T-Bob tries to make one out of plastic as Scott warns him about the horrors of plastic bag-type suffocation.
57	"Incident in Istanbul"	17 December 1985
Miles Mayhem, Cliff Dagger, Sly Rax, Vanessa Warfield, and Bruno Sheppard hijack an armored car in Istanbul stealing Constantine's chess set, which contains the secrets to finding his golden crown. Safety tip: Matt scolds Scott and T-Bob for playing around in the Thunderhawk after T-Bob turned off the emergency brake while also stating that they could have been hurt.
58	"The Creeping Desert"	18 December 1985
A corrupt landowner named José Sanchez hires Miles Mayhem, Sly Rax, and Nash Gorey to destroy land in Acapulco, Mexico, rendering them worthless patches of desert so he can buy it cheaply and restore the land later with an advanced hydration machine called the Rehydrator. Safety tip: After Scott saved up on his allowance, Matt talks him out of buying fireworks to blow up some toys.
59	"The Scarlet Empress"	19 December 1985
M.A.S.K. member Calhoun Burns accidentally shrinks a giant priceless statue called the Scarlet Empress that Miles Mayhem, Sly Rax, and Nash Gorey are trying to steal. A curious bird makes off with the statue. Safety tip: When passing by an old abandoned house, Scott tells T-Bob that there is no such things as ghosts.
60	"Venice Menace"	20 December 1985
Miles Mayhem, Sly Rax, Vanessa Warfield, and Bruno Sheppard have a special chemical that turns the waters around Venice to jelly, allowing Stinger to drive on the surface and dig up Cleopatra's sunken barge. Safety tip: As Scott finds T-Bob lifting weights, he tells T-Bob that he should work each level up gradually to avoid straining himself.
61	"Treasure of the Nazca Plain"	23 December 1985
M.A.S.K. foils a plot by Miles Mayhem, Vanessa Warfield, Floyd Malloy, and Nash Gorey to steal a prehistoric South American treasure when V.E.N.O.M. uses a device to make strange rainfalls. Safety tip: While working on Planet of the Slave Robots, Scott warns T-Bob about the horrors of being splattered by cold water and hot grease.
62	"Disappearing Act"	24 December 1985
Miles Mayhem, Cliff Dagger, Sly Rax, and Vanessa Warfield steal priceless automobiles by shrinking them with a shrink ray. Safety tip: Scott reminds T-Bob to wear a baseball helmet when playing baseball.
63	"Gate of Darkness"	25 December 1985
Miles Mayhem, Cliff Dagger, Sly Rax, and Bruno Sheppard abduct a cobra from the Shiva Festival whose hood shows the way through a maze that leads to treasure in the Himalayas. Safety tip: After watching a Tarzan movie, Scott advises T-Bob and a friend of his the pitfalls of climbing a tree that involves falling off a tree.
64	"The Manakara Giant"	26 December 1985
Miles Mayhem, Sly Rax, and Vanessa Warfield use a magnetic weapon to crash ships into rocky beaches. Local natives believe that it is caused by an ancient curse involving the Ghost of Manakara until M.A.S.K. discovers otherwise. Safety tip: Matt holds a fire drill in the Trakker mansion and states to Scott and T-Bob that they should have a fire route mapped out in advance and have something that can help them get down from the second floor.
65	"Raiders of the Orient Express"	27 December 1985
Miles Mayhem, Cliff Dagger, Sly Rax, and Vanessa Warfield infiltrate the Orient Express looking for clues to "Mad" King Ludwig's treasures. Safety tip: Scott tells T-Bob the horrors of crossing a railroad track in the event that a train is heading their way.

=== Season 2 (1986) ===
No.	Title	Original release date
R1	"Demolition Duel to the Death"	6 September 1986
During a harrowing demolition derby in Memphis, Tennessee, V.E.N.O.M. agents Vanessa Warfield, Bruno Sheppard, and Lester Sludge discover that one of their own, a new V.E.N.O.M. recruit named Boris Bushkin, is actually a M.A.S.K. double agent who foils their plans to eliminate M.A.S.K. member Buddie Hawks. Safety tip: As Lester Sludge plans to try out the bathtub in Miles Mayhem's deluxe house, Miles tells him not to bring an electronic device like a radio with him.
R2	"Where Eagles Dare"	1 October 1986
In Zadobi, Matt Trakker takes on the Mayhem brothers in a race that will win the victor a profitable transportation license as Bruno Sheppard, Floyd Malloy, and Lester Sludge plan to sabotage Matt's chances. Safety tip: While tending to Miles' garden, Sly Rax warns Bruno Sheppard about the pitfalls of leaving rakes and other related tools lying around as Bruno learns the hard way upon stepping on a rake.
R3	"Homeward Bound"	8 October 1986
M.A.S.K. member Ali Bombay returns to his homelands in India but finds that Miles Mayhem, Floyd Malloy, Nash Gorey, and Lester Sludge are using villagers as slaves to mine a valuable meteorite. Safety tip: After bumping into Buzzard enough to leave a dent, a V.E.N.O.M. drone is told by Miles Mayhem not to hide in anything that that nobody can get out of when he and Maximus Mayhem find the drone hiding in a freezer.
R4	"The Battle of the Giants"	12 October 1986
In Australia, Matt Trakker and the Mayhem brothers race to win a trophy that contains a secret formula. The Mayhem twins, of course, play dirty in order to win the prize by having Floyd Malloy interfere with Matt. Safety tip: Brad and Boris learn about the pitfalls overloading the circuits in the Trakker mansion by activating too many electronic appliances.
R5	"Race Against Time"	22 October 1986
Somewhere in the Mediterranean Sea, Brad Turner undertakes a mission to retrieve a rare plant needed to fight a spreading virus. He soon finds that Sly Rax, Vanessa Warfield, and Bruno Sheppard are after the plant as well. Safety tip: Nevada Rushmore warns Jacqueline LaFleur about inquiring information first before she can consider petting a dog.
R6	"Challenge of the Masters"	29 October 1986
With guidance from Matt, Calhoun, Ace, Ali, Bombay, and Alex compete against Miles Mayhem, Sly Rax, Vanessa Warfield, Bruno Sheppard, and Floyd Malloy in a race to win a trophy containing a microfilm that has secret access codes to any computer in the world. Safety tip: When Boris calls for a real emergency, Matt dials 911 and discovers that Boris accidentally burnt his borscht.
R7	"For One Shining Moment"	5 November 1986
Miles Mayhem, Bruno Sheppard, Floyd Malloy, Lester Sludge, and Maximus Mayhem surprisingly show kindness by organizing a race for "charity" in Chicago while luring M.A.S.K. to participate, but the race is really a V.E.N.O.M. trap to eliminate M.A.S.K. once and for all. Safety tip: As Scott takes care of a puppy named Eliot, Matt scolds Scott while telling him the horrors of leaving a pet in car with closed windows.
R8	"High Noon"	12 November 1986
In Wichita, Kansas, Matt, Brad, Ace, Calhoun, and Boris compete against Miles Mayhem, Sly Rax, Vanessa Warfield, Bruno Sheppard, and Maximus Mayhem in a land, air, and sea race to show off their vehicle capabilities. V.E.N.O.M. uses the race as a diversion to steal plans for a top secret jet. Safety tip: After Clutch fixes T-Bob, he advises Scott to wear a helmet if he is going to do some riding.
R9	"The Battle For Baja"	19 November 1986
In Tijuana, M.A.S.K. enters a Baja race where the Mexican President's son Raul Vega is also a competitor and offered to drive Goliath I by Matt Trakker. Miles Mayhem, Sly Rax, Floyd Malloy, Lester Sludge, and Maximus Mayhem use this opportunity to kidnap Vega for ransom. Safety tip: Vanessa Warfield and Floyd Malloy know where to hide in the event of an earthquake. What they thought was an earthquake was actually Bruno Sheppard playing with a jumprope.
R10	"Cliff Hanger"	26 November 1986
Brad and Vanessa compete in a drag race. Meanwhile, Miles Mayhem, Bruno Sheppard, Floyd Malloy, Lester Sludge, and Maximus Mayhem get their hands on dangerous seeds that can cause a plague emitted from dangerous seeds. M.A.S.K. races to stop them. Safety tip: As Scott is ready for one of Alex's famous omelets, both of them take precautions when they smell gas.

== Production ==
One of many cartoons produced during the 1980s as a vehicle for toy merchandising, M.A.S.K. was a hybrid of popular era cartoons G.I. Joe: A Real American Hero and The Transformers. When originally broadcast, M.A.S.K. was the first closed-captioned series to air in first-run syndication.

== Home media ==
Several episodes of the series were released under Karl-Lorimar's "Kideo Video" branding on VHS in the 1980s, with two episodes per tape. The "racing" second season was distributed by Tempest Video.

In the United Kingdom, two releases titled M.A.S.K The Movie and M.A.S.K The Movie II were released by Tempo Video, featuring episodes edited into a feature-length format. Several episodes of season one were distributed by The Video Collection in association with Karl Lorimar's Kideo Video, and later by Castle Vision. The episodes from season two were distributed by Golden Book Video.

M.A.S.K. episodes have been released on DVD in three different regions:

- USA: Shout! Factory acquired the Region 1 DVD rights and released a "Complete Series" set on 9 August 2011 containing only the episodes from the first season of the original series (65 episodes), as well as a separate 2-disc collection of the first 11 episodes, called "Volume 1" and released the same day. The second season, which consists of 10 episodes, are owned by WildBrain and are not part of the acquisition.
- UK: A single DVD set containing the first 5 episodes was released by Maximum Entertainment (under license from Jetix Europe) in August 2004. In November 2007, Maximum released Collection 1, containing the same number of episodes as the Australian set. Collection 1 was re-released on 31 August 2009, and Collection 2 was released on 28 September the same year. Both sets (the re-issue of Collection 1 and 2) were distributed through Lace DVD, replacing Maximum Entertainment, and both sets are in Region 2 PAL format. All 75 episodes were released across both sets.
- Australia and New Zealand: Madman Entertainment released the complete series over two DVD collections for the first time in Australia and New Zealand. Collection 1 was released in November 2006 and contains episodes 1–38, while Collection 2 was released in March 2007 and contains episodes 39–75 which includes the season 2 episodes.

== Reception ==
While certain critics criticized the show for showing the weaponry and vehicles "at the expense of anything deeper in terms of plotting and characterization", the show was quite successful. IGN voted M.A.S.K. the 99th-best animated series in 2009, calling it one of the most popular cartoon/toy marketing franchises of the 1980s, stating that it took many of the strengths of G.I. Joe and Transformers while taking few of their flaws.

== In other media ==
In 2015, Hasbro and Paramount were planning a cinematic universe combining M.A.S.K. with G.I. Joe, Visionaries: Knights of the Magical Light, Micronauts, and Rom. A writers' room was formed consisting of Michael Chabon, Brian K. Vaughan, Nicole Perlman, Cheo Hodari Coker, John Francis Daley, and others to develop storylines, with Akiva Goldsman overseeing the project, but it disbanded in 2017. The next year, F. Gary Gray was attached to direct a live-action M.A.S.K. adaptation. Chris Bremner was later hired to write the script.
