= Pastoria =

Fictional character from L. Frank Baum's Oz-series

- Oz character
- 1925 cover illustration by John R. Neill
- First appearance: The Wizard of Oz (1902) (non-continuity); The Marvelous Land of Oz (1904) (mentioned)
- Created by: L. Frank Baum

In-universe information
- Nickname: The Lost King of Oz
- Species: Human
- Gender: Male
- Family: A previous King (father)
- Spouse: Lurline
- Children: Ozma (daughter)

King Pastoria is a fictional character mentioned in the Oz books by American author L. Frank Baum. He was the rightful ruler and King of the undiscovered Land of Oz, but was mysteriously removed from his position when the Wizard of Oz unexpectedly came to the country and took the throne, proclaiming himself as the new dominant ruler of Oz. Shortly after, Pastoria's only child and heir, Princess Ozma, suddenly vanished, leaving not a single clue of her whereabouts.

Eventually in the second Oz book The Marvelous Land of Oz (1904) (where Pastoria's past is first mentioned in detail), Glinda the Good finally finds Ozma, who was transformed by the evil witch Mombi into a boy, preventing anyone from recognizing her and thus allowing Mombi to ascend to the throne. Glinda forces Mombi to undo this curse and Ozma was established back in her place as the official child Queen of Oz.

== Original appearance ==
Baum actually created the character of Pastoria for the 1902 stage musical, The Wizard of Oz, freely adapted from his book. At the start of that play, King Pastoria II has been banished from Oz and is working as a street car conductor in America with a waitress girlfriend named Trixie Tryfle. By the second act, Pastoria is restored to his Emerald City throne and orders all who allied with the Wizard (including the four classic protagonists) to be executed for treason. Of course the four characters and the Wizard each escape. Nothing of the stage character but his name made it into Baum's books.

== The classic books by L. Frank Baum ==
He is mentioned as "dead and gone" by the Scarecrow in The Marvelous Land of Oz, though there is no narrational confirmation. This novel, which was the sequel to Baum's The Wonderful Wizard of Oz, also describes Princess Ozma as "the only child of the former Ruler of Oz, and was entitled to rule in his place."

L. Frank Baum's fourth Oz book, Dorothy and the Wizard in Oz, chronicles that Pastoria's father (Ozma's grandfather) ruled Oz before the wicked witches conquered the land and divided it among themselves, but makes it unclear as to whether Pastoria himself ruled Oz. Ozma explains in this book that all Ozian rulers were named "Oz" if male and "Ozma" if female; the fact that her father had a personal name makes it questionable as to whether he had the chance to actually rule as King, before being captured by Mombi. In any event, both Pastoria and his father became slaves of Mombi, the erstwhile Wicked Witch of the North.

=== Later books ===
In The Magical Mimics in Oz (1946), Jack Snow wrote that Pastoria had adopted Ozma as a baby fairy. This explains why the series contains no mention of her mother.

In The Lost King of Oz (1925), Ruth Plumly Thompson built her plot around a quest for Pastoria. Mombi had enchanted him in the form of Tora the Tired Tailor with no memory of his true identity and with ears that can fly off his face often coming together like a butterfly. This book mentions that Pastoria had a hunting lodge in the Quadling Country within a town called Morrow. At the end of the story, he returns to the Emerald City and Mombi is forced to disenchant him. Pastoria is happy to let Ozma keep ruling and opens a tailor shop called The Tired Tailor of Oz under his own name. Before he steps down as King, Pastoria's last act was to have Mombi executed by water.

The character is hardly featured in Ruth Plumly Thompson's Oz books thereafter, limited to brief mentions in The Gnome King of Oz (conversing with Nick Chopper about the latter's crop of tin cans) and in The Yellow Knight of Oz (referred to only as the Lost King, playing checkers with the Soldier with the Green Whiskers).

Lin Carter wrote an unauthorized sequel, The Tired Tailor of Oz, that focused on the character. It was published posthumously in 2001. Normally, with The Lost King of Oz still protected by copyright, stories involving Pastoria-as-tailor are unpublishable, but Carter had the clout and funds to do so that most contemporary Oz writers do not have. It should also be noted that 2001 was the expected date of Lost King's passage into the public domain; the Copyright Term Extension Act of 1998 postponed this until 2021.

== Recent works ==
In Gregory Maguire's revisionist Oz novels Wicked: The Life and Times of the Wicked Witch of the West and Son of a Witch, "Pastorius" was the widower of Ozma the Bilious, who died from an apparently accidental poisoning, and father to Ozma Tippetarius, who was approximately the same age as Elphaba. As Ozma Tippetarius was too young to take the throne when her mother died, Pastorius ruled as Ozma Regent until the monarchy was overthrown by the Wizard. Pastorius died during his subsequent imprisonment.

King Pastoria appeared in the 2017 NBC series Emerald City portrayed by Sorel Kembe. This version has Pastoria as a family name. His first name is Samuel and he has a wife named Katherine. A flashback showed that King Pastoria fought against the Beast Forever even when it was in the form of a giant tidal wave that killed a lot of witches. He and Katherine were later killed by Eamonn during the Wizard of Oz's ascension.

Preceded by King Oz, number unknown	Monarch of Oz	Succeeded by The Wizard of Oz
