= The Kushner-Locke Company =

American film production company

- Formerly: Atlantic/Kushner-Locke (1986–1989)
- Type: Public
- Industry: Film; Television
- Founded: March 12, 1983
- Founders: Donald Kushner; Peter Locke
- Defunct: 2002
- Fate: Bankruptcy
- Successor: Multicom Entertainment Group, Inc.
- Headquarters: Century City, Los Angeles, California, United States
- Services: Film production; Television production

The Kushner-Locke Company was an American independent motion picture/television production company founded on March 12, 1983 by Donald Kushner and Peter Locke.

It is known for films such as The Adventures of Pinocchio, Liberace: Behind the Music, Basil, But I'm a Cheerleader, Freeway, Nutcracker: The Motion Picture and Teen Wolf. Kushner-Locke also produced animated films such as The Brave Little Toaster, The Brave Little Toaster to the Rescue, The Brave Little Toaster Goes to Mars, Rover Dangerfield, Dorothy Meets Ozma of Oz and Pound Puppies and the Legend of Big Paw. They additionally co-produced the later episodes of the 1980s revival of Divorce Court with Storer Communications and distributed by Blair Entertainment.

== History ==
In 1983, the company was established by Donald Kushner and Peter Locke, the former of whom was a producer on the movie Tron, and the latter was a sales agent, and member of the Channing/Debin/Locke Company (which he co-founded with Stockard Channing and David Debin). In January 1987, it sold a minority interest to Atlantic Entertainment Group thus renaming it Atlantic/Kushner-Locke. That year, in 1987, it had attempted to merge with television syndicator All American Television to form a single company that paid $36 million in a single transaction in order to establish it as a public company without an effort of an underwriting of an initial public offering, but the merger talks between Atlantic/Kushner-Locke and All American Television were never realized. Atlantic sold back its share in July 1988, and the company reverted to its original name.

In 1992, the company attempted a merger with Rysher Entertainment, but the deal's plans collapsed when neither company could come to an accord over who would get control of the combined company. On December 14, 1992, Patricia Clifford, who had just left Interscope Communications, launched a Kushner-Locke affiliated production company, whose intent was to produce telemovies.

On April 29, 1997, Pascal Borno was named head of Kushner-Locke International. On March 12, 1998, Kushner/Locke International scored picture-pact deals with various motion picture companies, as well as with television networks around the world.

In 2001, Kushner-Locke filed for Chapter 11 bankruptcy, and has operated under this stature since then. In November of that same year, Artisan Entertainment (now owned by Lionsgate) acquired the North American sales rights to its more than 300 titles. In 2013, the Kushner-Locke library was acquired by Multicom Entertainment from Lionsgate.
