= Princess Ozma =

Fictional character from Land of Oz

Princess Ozma of Oz
- Oz character
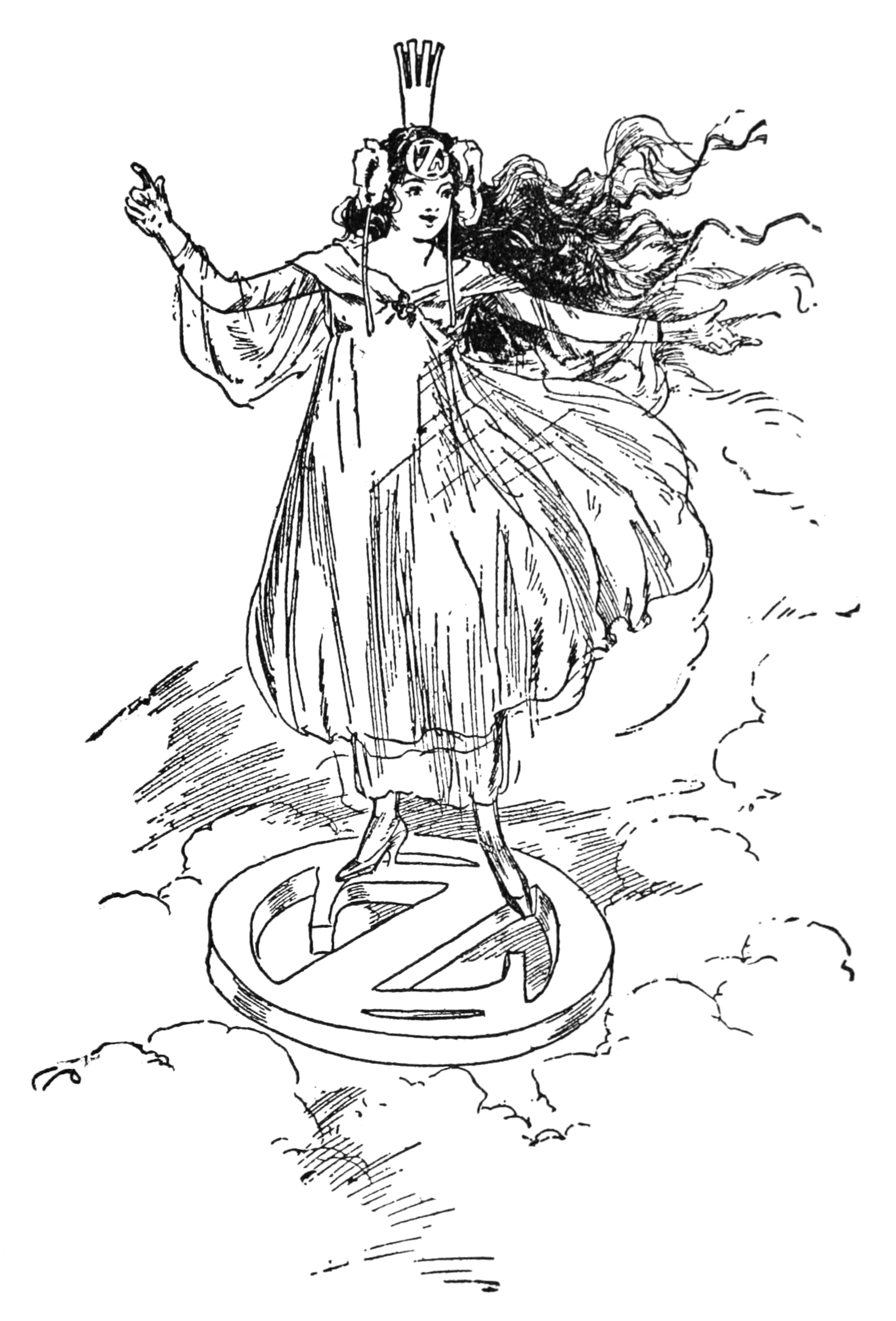
- Illustration from The Lost Princess of Oz by John R. Neill
- First appearance: The Marvelous Land of Oz (1904)
- Created by: L. Frank Baum

In-universe information
- Aliases: Tippetarius, or Tip
- Species: Human-Fairy hybrid
- Gender: Female (as Ozma); Male (as Tip)
- Title(s): Queen of Oz (officially); Princess of Oz (more commonly)
- Occupation: Supreme Ruler of Oz
- Family: Pastoria (father); Queen Lurline (mother); Ozana (first cousin); Ozga (cousin); Mist Maidens (cousins)
- Children: None, though Jack Pumpkinhead thinks of himself as her son.
- Relatives: Queen Lurline's fairy band; L. Frank Baum said she descends from a long line of fairy Queens

Princess Ozma of Oz, formerly known as Tippetarius, is a fictional character from the Land of Oz, created by American author L. Frank Baum. She appears for the first time in the second Oz book, The Marvelous Land of Oz (1904), and in every Oz book thereafter.

== According to Baum's series ==
Ozma is the rightful ruler of Oz, and Baum indicated that she would reign in the fairyland forever, being immortal. Baum described her physical appearance in detail, in The Marvelous Land of Oz: "Her eyes sparkled as two diamonds, and her lips were tinted like a tourmaline. All adown her back floated tresses of ruddy gold, with a slender jeweled circlet confining them at the brow." As initially illustrated by John R. Neill, she fit this description. In most subsequent Oz books, illustrations depicted her as a brunette.

Ozma is the daughter of the former King Pastoria. As an infant, she was given to the witch Mombi of the North by the Wizard of Oz. Mombi transformed Ozma into a boy and called him "Tip" (short for Tippetarius) in order to prevent the rightful ruler of Oz from ascending to the throne. Ozma spent her entire childhood with Mombi in the form of the boy Tip and had no memory of ever having been a girl. During this time, Tip had managed to create Jack Pumpkinhead who was brought to life by Mombi's Powder of Life. In The Marvelous Land of Oz, Glinda the Good Sorceress discovered what had happened and forced Mombi to turn Tip back into Ozma. Since then, the Princess has possessed the Throne of Oz (although many realms within Oz remained unaware of her authority).

In two of his last Oz books, namely The Tin Woodman of Oz and Glinda of Oz, Baum indicated that Ozma has the appearance of a fourteen-year-old and therefore older than Dorothy Gale. By that point in time, Baum had also established that the inhabitants of Oz cease to age, suggesting that Ozma would always appear to be young and beautiful.

Baum was not inclined to worry about strict continuity in his series, however, and so there were discrepancies in the origins and very nature of Ozma. In her initial appearances, she was portrayed as no more than a human princess, born shortly before the Wizard's arrival in Oz. Later in the series, Baum revealed that Ozma is actually a fairy, descending from "a long line of fairy queens" as stated in The Scarecrow of Oz. In The Magic of Oz, Glinda tells Dorothy that no one knows how old Ozma really is. In Baum's final book, Glinda of Oz, Ozma herself explains that she was in fact a member of the Fairy Queen Lurline's band when Lurline enchanted Oz and turned it into a fairyland.

Jack Snow attempted to reconcile Baum's disparate accounts in The Shaggy Man of Oz, which explains that the Fairy Queen Lurline had left the infant Ozma in the care of King Pastoria, making the Princess the adopted daughter of the last King of Oz. This does not gel with the version of Ozma's story which says she is an ageless fairy who has ruled Oz for centuries.

Ozma frequently encounters difficulties while ruling her kingdom. In The Lost Princess of Oz, for instance, the Fairy Princess is kidnapped, although her dearest friend Dorothy comes to her rescue with a search party. Both Dorothy and Ozma are captured by the wicked Queen Coo-ee-oh in Glinda of Oz, while trying to stop a war between two races, but Glinda manages to save them with the help of the Three Adepts at Sorcery. In order to circumvent trouble, Ozma prohibits anyone other than the Wizard of Oz and Glinda from practicing magic in Oz unless they have a permit.

L. Frank Baum portrayed Ozma as an exceedingly benevolent and compassionate ruler, who never resorts to violence and who does not believe in destroying even her worst enemies. In Ozma of Oz, she even left Oz in order to rescue the Royal Family of Ev from the clutches of the Nome King, demonstrating that her kindness and concern extends far beyond her own kingdom. When the Nome King tried to conquer and destroy Oz in revenge, Ozma insisted on maintaining a pacifist disposition, which led to the Scarecrow's suggestion that Ozma's enemies be made to forget about their wicked intentions by drinking from the Fountain of Oblivion.

Furthermore, Ozma discontinued the use of money in Oz, and took systematic measures to ensure that all the citizens of Oz receive the land's resources in equal measure, without having to work harder than necessary.

Ozma invited several people from the outside world to come live in the Land of Oz, most notably Dorothy, The Wizard, Aunt Em, Uncle Henry, Betsy Bobbin, Trot, Button Bright and Cap'n Bill.

According to the timeline of The Road to Oz, Ozma's birthday falls on August 21.

== Relationship with Dorothy ==
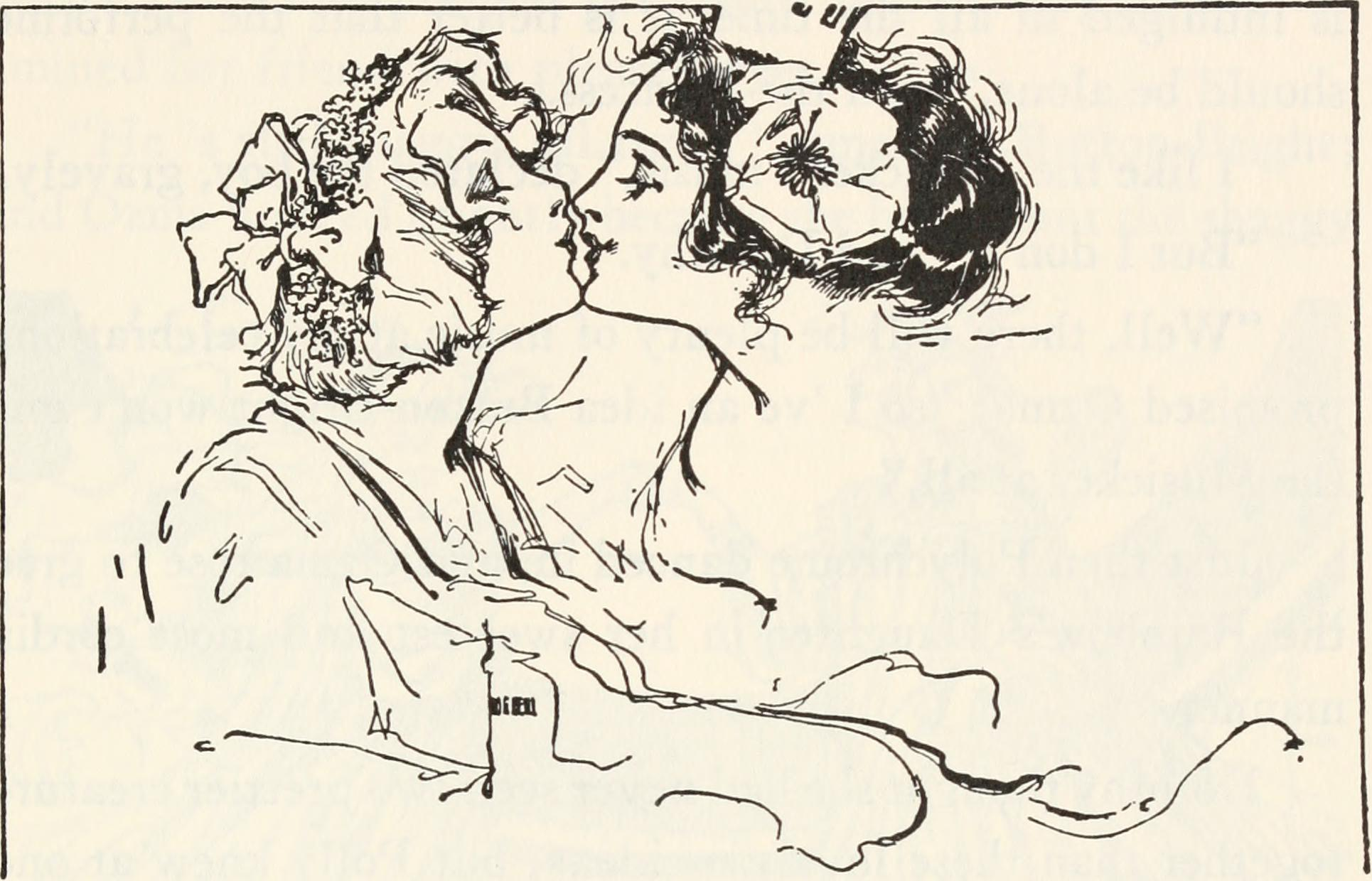
Dorothy and Ozma kissing in an image from The Road to Oz

When Ozma first meets Dorothy, Oz's greatest heroine, in Ozma of Oz, they immediately like each other and become best friends; in the canonical Oz books by Baum, Dorothy and Ozma are each other's closest relationship.

In The Emerald City of Oz Ozma arranges, at Dorothy's request, for Dorothy and her family to move into the palace, and Ozma declares her an official princess of Oz and her "constant companion". In The Lost Princess of Oz the first page mentions that Ozma loves Dorothy very much and by page two says that Dorothy is the only one privileged to enter Ozma's rooms without an invitation. In turn, Dorothy often represents Ozma when some task takes the latter away from the Emerald City.

== Ozma and Tip ==
Ozma was born a girl but was magically transformed into a boy named Tip while an infant to hide her from Glinda the Good. Tip was raised as a boy until his early teens, at which point, after the adventures detailed in The Marvelous Land of Oz, Tip is informed that he was born a girl. After some trepidation, Tip agreed to be transformed back into a girl and assumes rule of The Land of Oz as Princess Ozma.

In the interactive fiction adaptation of the Oz books by Windham Classics, Tip is made monarch of Oz and no reference at all is made to Ozma.

Jack Snow, Melody Grandy, and Scott Andrew Hutchins have all made divergent attempts to bring Tip back alongside Ozma. Snow's device, which Hutchins followed as if canon, was that Tip seized his life from Ozma, but that Glinda and the Wizard were able to restore them both and make them siblings. Grandy made the characters totally unrelated through the use of a "Switcheroo Spell", with Ozma unrelated to Tippetarius and therefore suitable as a possible love interest. Snow's story, "A Murder in Oz" (1956) was rejected by Ellery Queen's Mystery Magazine and published in The Baum Bugle. Grandy's The Disenchanted Princess of Oz has been published by Tails of the Cowardly Lion and Friends. Hutchins's Tip of Oz, heavily mulling over ideas such as Pastoria-as-tailor and the execution of Mombi in The Lost King of Oz and similar material in The Giant Horse of Oz, received a one-paragraph citation in Eldred v. Ashcroft, and remains unpublished under the Copyright Term Extension Act.

== Other appearances ==
=== In TV and movies ===
- Ozma was first portrayed by Blanche Deyo in the 1905 musical The Woggle-Bug.
- In a 1914 film created by Baum's film company, The Patchwork Girl of Oz, Ozma, played by Jessie May Walsh, appears briefly to preside over Ojo's trial. At the beginning of this film, as well as Baum's His Majesty, the Scarecrow of Oz, Ozma's smiling countenance (being the face of Vivian Reed) appears.
- Annette Funicello played her in a 1957 pilot segment for the proposed Walt Disney production, The Rainbow Road to Oz.
- Shirley Temple, having reportedly been considered for the role of Dorothy Gale in the 1939 movie musical The Wizard of Oz but passed over in favor of Judy Garland, eventually portrayed Princess Ozma in a 1960 television production of The Marvelous Land of Oz, in which she also portrayed Tip.
- Ozma appears briefly in Barry Mahon's 1969 The Wonderful Land of Oz, portrayed by Joy Webb.
- Joan Gerber voiced Ozma in the 1980 television special Thanksgiving in the Land of Oz.
- In the 1987 direct-to-video animated short Dorothy meets Ozma of Oz, an abridged but faithful adaptation of the book Ozma of Oz, Ozma's voice is provided by either Nancy Chance or Sandra J. Butcher (the credits do not specify).
- Ozma was portrayed by Emma Ridley in the 1985 film Return to Oz (which was a blending of elements from the books Ozma of Oz and The Marvelous Land of Oz) while director Walter Murch's daughter Beatrice dubbed her lines. Ridley's version fit Baum's original description of Ozma. Her Earth appearance is an unnamed girl in a Dr. J.B. Worley's hospital who tips off Dorothy to the danger of Dr. Worley's machines.
- In the 1986 Japanese animated series The Wonderful Wizard of Oz, Ozma's transformation into Tip was so thorough that, despite bearing almost no physical resemblance whatever to Tip, she is a tomboy for a long while and only well into the last story arc of the series comes into her own as a princess.
- In the 1986 series The Oz Kids, Andrea (Shay Astar), Glinda's ambivalent daughter, bases her fashion, but little else, on Ozma, who never appeared in the series.
- Ozma also appears in the Russian animated Adventures in the Emerald City: Princess Ozma (2000) based on The Marvelous Land of Oz as well as in the 1987 Canadian Dorothy Meets Ozma of Oz based on Ozma of Oz and a 2005 direct to video CGI version of The Patchwork Girl of Oz where she is voiced by Lisa Rosenstock.
- In Lost in Oz, an unaired 2002 pilot for a Warner Brothers drama show, Ozma appeared as a young, helpless girl kept eternally young by the Wicked Witch of the West. The main characters of that show rescued her and returned her to the good witch. However, throughout the show, she does not have any lines.
- In the 2017 animated series Dorothy and the Wizard of Oz, Ozma is voiced by Kari Wahlgren (who also voices Dorothy Gale). After she was formerly trapped by the Nome King, Dorothy rescued Ozma and she took her rightful place as queen.
- In the 2017 live-action series Emerald City, Tip/Ozma is played by Jordan Loughran.
- The American animated web series RWBY features an homage to Tip, in the form of main character Oscar Pine, who is the current incarnation of the warrior Ozma.

=== In comics and post-Baum literature ===
- In the Vertigo comic book series Fables, Ozma appears as one of the magicians and witches led by Frau Totenkinder. She first appeared as an unnamed blonde girl, but in a one-page comic handed out at the 2009 Comic-Con she is seen to be wearing a belt resembling the Magic Belt from the Oz books and mentions she is "not so young." Later, in issue #87 (October 2009) Frau Totenkinder actually addresses her as "sweet little Ozma." Later on, she is proven to be Ozma, and to be a powerful enough witch to lead the Fable community's magic-users, after Frau Totenkinder leaves unexpectedly.
- Tip makes a cameo appearance In Son of a Witch, the second volume of "The Wicked Years", Gregory Maguire's revisionist take on Oz. Liir (son of Elphaba, the Wicked Witch of the West) briefly encounters Tip and Mombi (the latter unnamed, but with a description matching Baum's and leading the four-horned cow mentioned on the first page of The Marvelous Land of Oz). Tip suggests to Mombi that she sell him to Liir, but Liir replies, "I don't buy children.... I can't save anyone. You have to save yourself."
- Tip and Mombi (called "Mombey" by Maguire) play a larger role In Out of Oz, the fourth volume of "The Wicked Years". In Out of Oz, Tip first appears as a runaway in the city of Shiz and is befriended by Rain (daughter of Liir and granddaughter of Elphaba), and flees the city with her. Later, when Liir is abducted by thugs in Mombey's employ (and transformed into an Elephant), Tip returns to Mombey hoping to secure Liir's release. Near the novel's conclusion, Tip and Rain are reunited and have just finished making love while Mombey performs a spell called "To Call the Lost Forward", in order to return Liir to his proper form; the spell inadvertently also returns Tip to his true form (Ozma) and restores Rain's natural green skin. Although the circumstances of the spell are quite different from those in The Marvelous Land of Oz, details of it closely resemble Baum's description and the illustration of Mombi's spell by John R. Neill. In Maguire's version of Oz, Mombey has kept Ozma in the form of the boy Tip for almost a century.
- In the Marion G. Harmon superhero novel series Wearing the Cape, Ozma appears in the third book, Young Sentinels. According to the book's narrator, Astra, she is a supernatural breakthrough (a person who has developed superpowers) who believes herself to be Ozma; it is unknown whether she was manifested into reality by an unknown person's breakthrough or if the breakthrough transformed the person into Ozma. She becomes a member of Astra's team of Young Sentinels and often explains the differences between Baum's description of events to what she alleges "really" occurred.
- In the Dorothy Must Die series by Danielle Paige, Ozma plays a key role. Dorothy has deposed her from her throne at the start of the series.

=== In video games ===
- Ozma appears as an enemy in the 2020 Library of Ruina as one of a series of encounters based on characters from the Land of Oz. She is depicted here as an inhuman cursed princess with a withered body and a blood soaked veil covering her features. Her battle gimmick is centered around her pumpkin headed "Jack" minions.

== Influence ==
Ozma was a direct influence on the design of the protagonist Padmé Amidala in the Star Wars prequel trilogy. In a 2022 interview with Star Wars Insider, concept artist Iain McCaig related the instructions that Lucasfilm provided its artists to visualize characters, saying, "Amidala was described as 'kind of like Ozma' from The Wizard of Oz". According to McCaig, he chose actress Natalie Portman as a model for his designs because he felt she evoked the Oz character, saying, "She had Ozma's aura of vulnerability and strength." After producer/director George Lucas spoke with McCaig about this inspiration, Lucas cast Portman to play her.

The band Ozma was named after her.

== See also ==
- Project Ozma

Preceded by Jinjur	Monarch of Oz	Succeeded by Incumbent
