= Jim Carlson (screenwriter) =

American screenwriter

Jim Carlson (August 29, 1932 – August 25, 2007) was an American film and television writer. He has been involved in shows like Rowan & Martin's Laugh-In, Emergency!, CHiPs and Battlestar Galactica, Spiral Zone, Beetlejuice, X-Men, the movie Pound Puppies and the Legend of Big Paw, and an ABC special based on The Mouse and the Motorcycle. He often collaborated with writer Terrence McDonnell.

== Screenwriting credits ==
=== Television ===
- series head writer denoted in bold
- Lancelot Link, Secret Chimp (1970)
- Rowan & Martin’s Laugh-In (1970)
- Adam-12 (1973)
- Emergency! (1975)
- The Jeffersons (1975)
- Gemini Man (1976)
- The Six Million Dollar Man (1976)
- Battlestar Galactica (1978)
- CHiPs (1978)
- The Bionic Woman (1978)
- The Life and Times of Grizzly Adams (1978)
- Magnum, P.I. (1981)
- Kidd Video (1984)
- The Love Boat (1984)
- Riptide (1985)
- The Mouse and the Motorcycle (1986)
- Spiral Zone (1987)
- Good Morning, Miss Bliss (1989)
- The New Adventures of He-Man (1990)
- Peter Pan & the Pirates (1991)
- James Bond Jr. (1991)
- Goof Troop (1992)
- X-Men (1992)
- The Pink Panther (1993)
- Exosquad (1994)

=== Films ===
- Dorothy Meets Ozma of Oz (1987)
- Pound Puppies and the Legend of Big Paw (1988)
