= The Marvelous Land of Oz =

1904 children's novel by L. Frank Baum

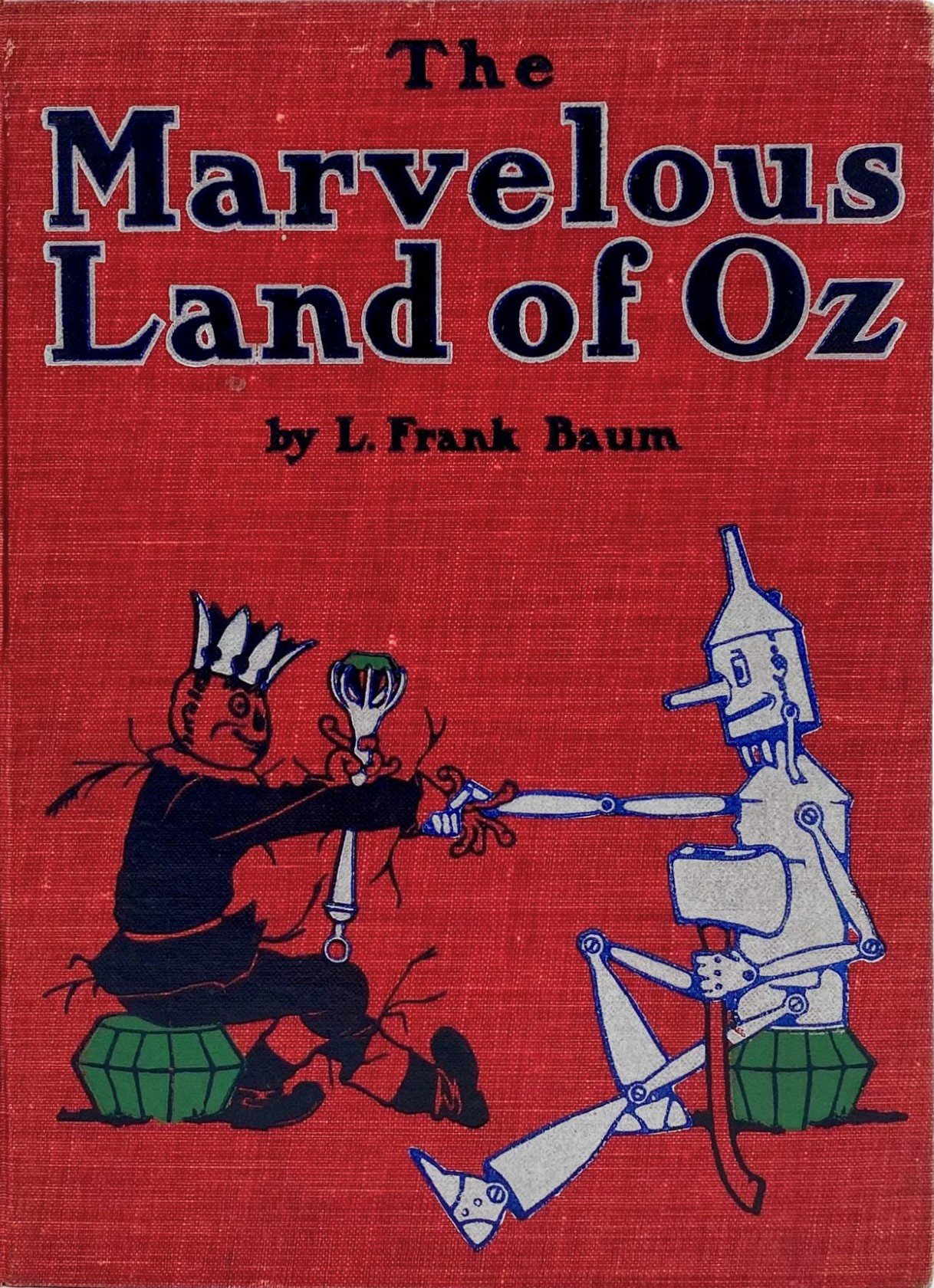
- First edition book cover
- Author: L. Frank Baum
- Illustrator: John R. Neill
- Language: English
- Series: The Oz books
- Genre: Children's novel
- Publisher: Reilly & Britton
- Publication date: July 1904
- Publication place: United States
- Media type: Print (hardcover)
- Pages: 287
- Preceded by: The Wonderful Wizard of Oz
- Followed by: Ozma of Oz
- Text: The Marvelous Land of Oz at Wikisource

The Marvelous Land of Oz: Being an Account of the Further Adventures of the Scarecrow and the Tin Woodman, commonly shortened to The Land of Oz, published in July 1904, is the second book in L. Frank Baum's Oz series, and the sequel to The Wonderful Wizard of Oz (1900). This and the following 34 books in the series were illustrated by John R. Neill. It was followed by Ozma of Oz (1907).

The story features the Scarecrow and the Tin Woodman, and introduces Princess Ozma and Jack Pumpkinhead to the Oz mythos.

== Plot summary ==
The events are set shortly after the events in The Wonderful Wizard of Oz and after Dorothy Gale's departure back to Kansas. The protagonist of the novel is an orphan boy called Tip.

For as long as he can remember, Tip has been under the guardianship of a cruel Wicked Witch named Mombi and lives in the northern quadrant of Oz called Gillikin Country. Mombi has always been extremely mean and abusive to Tip. As Mombi is returning home one day, Tip plans to get revenge and frighten her with a simulacrum that he has made with a large Jack-o'-lantern he carves for a head, tree branches for a body, pegs for joints, and old clothes from Mombi's chest. Tip then named him Jack Pumpkinhead. To Tip's dismay, Mombi is not fooled by this trick, and she takes this opportunity to demonstrate the new magical "Powder of Life" that she had just obtained from another sorcerer. Mombi tells Tip that she intends to transform him into a marble statue to punish him for his mischievous ways.

To avoid being turned into a marble statue, Tip runs away with Jack that very same night and steals the Powder of Life. He uses it to animate the wooden Sawhorse for Jack to ride. The Sawhorse runs so quickly that Tip is left behind. Walking alone, he meets General Jinjur's all-girl Army of Revolt which is planning to overthrow the Scarecrow (who has ruled the Emerald City since the end of The Wonderful Wizard of Oz after the Wizard of Oz left).

Meanwhile, Jack and the Sawhorse arrive at the Emerald City and make the acquaintance of His Majesty the Scarecrow. Jinjur and her crew invade the Emerald City, terrorize the citizens, and loot the city, causing great havoc and chaos. Tip joins Jack and the Scarecrow in the palace and they escape on the Sawhorse's back.

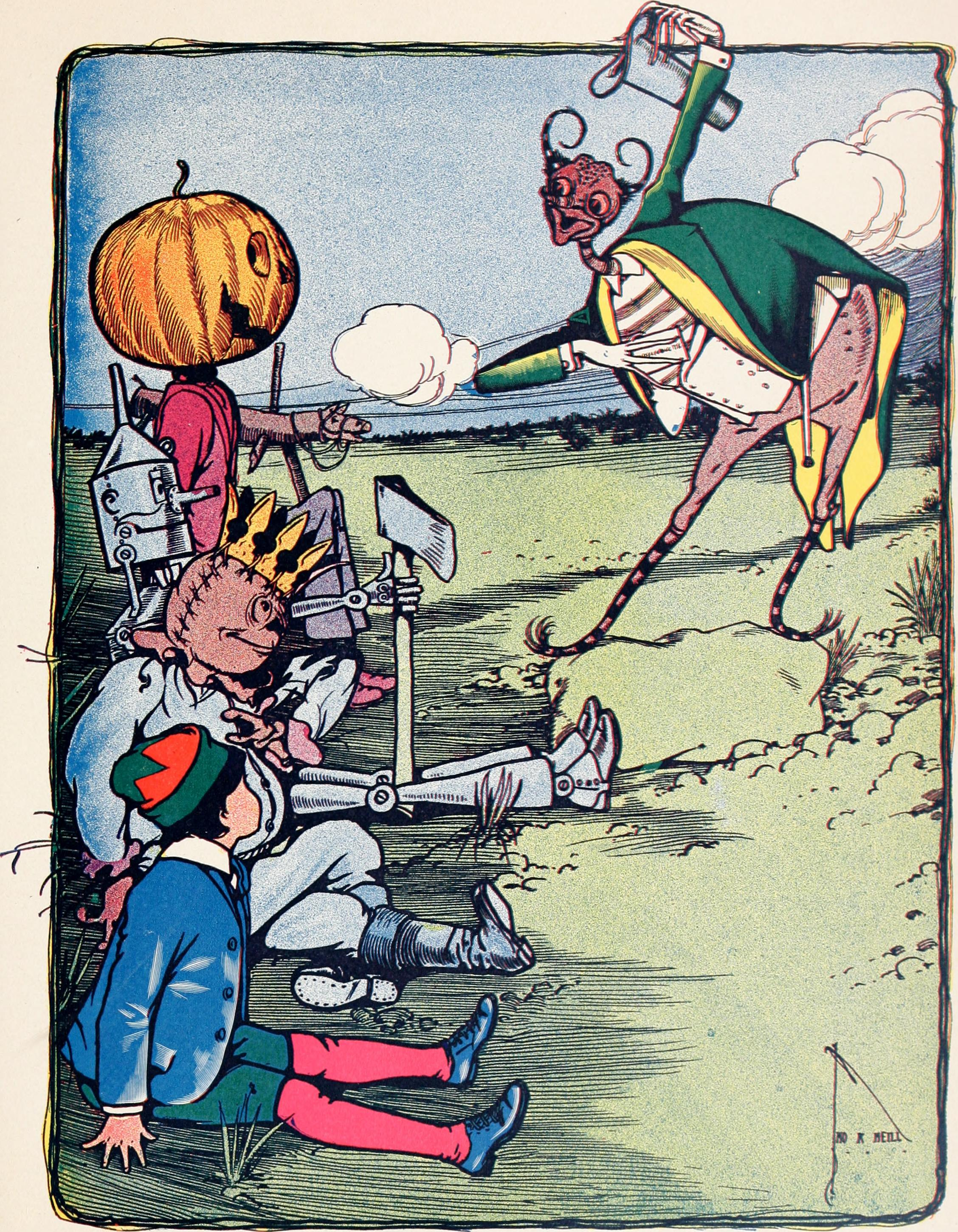
Jack Pumpkinhead, Tin Woodman, Scarecrow, and Tip meet the Woggle-Bug

The companions arrive at the tin castle of the Tin Woodman (who now rules the Winkie Kingdom following the Wicked Witch of the West's demise in the first book) and plan to retake the Emerald City with his help. On their way back, they are diverted by the magic of Mombi (whom Jinjur recruited to help her apprehend them). They are joined by the "Highly Magnified and Thoroughly Educated" Woggle-Bug, and aided by the loyal field mice and their Mouse Queen. The Queen of the Field Mice allows the Scarecrow to take twelve mice concealed in his straw.

When the party reaches the Emerald City, Jinjur and her soldiers imprison the group and lock them away. However, the female soldiers are scared by the field mice and leave the city's palace. However, they still occupy the grounds of the city and the palace is surrounded. The travelers are imprisoned in the palace. The Scarecrow proposes manufacturing a clever flying machine with a Gump's stuffed head to direct it. Tip uses the Powder of Life to animate this machine, which is assembled from two sofas, palm tree leaves, a broom, and tied together with clotheslines and ropes. Then they fly off, with no control over their direction, out of Oz. They land in a nest of jackdaws, which is full of all of the birds' stolen goods. The flying Gump's wings are damaged in the landing.

The jackdaws return to their nest and attack the travelers, carrying off the Scarecrow's straw. The nest contains a large amount of paper money, with which the Scarecrow can be re-stuffed. Using Wishing Pills they discover in the container holding the Powder of Life, Tip and his friends escape and journey to the palace of Glinda the Good Witch in Oz's southern quadrant, the Quadling Country. They learn from Glinda that after the fall of Oz's mortal king Pastoria decades ago, a long lost princess named Ozma was hidden away in secrecy when the Wizard of Oz took the throne. She also informs them that Ozma is the rightful ruler of the Emerald City and all of Oz in general, not the Scarecrow (who did not really want the job anyway even though he was popular). Glinda therefore accompanies Tip, Jack, the Sawhorse, the Scarecrow, the Tin Woodman, the Wogglebug, and the Gump back to the Emerald City to see Mombi. The crooked woman tries to deceive them by disguising a chambermaid named Jellia Jamb as herself (which fails), but manages to elude them as they search for her in the Emerald City. Just as their time runs out, the Tin Woodman plucks a rose to wear in his lapel, unaware that this is the transformed Mombi.

Glinda discovers the deception right away and leads the pursuit of Mombi, who is finally caught as she tries to cross the Deadly Desert in the form of a fast and long-running griffin. Under pressure from Glinda, Mombi finally confesses that the Wizard brought her the infant Ozma, whom she transformed into Tip, the boy. At first, Tip is utterly shocked and appalled to learn this, but Glinda and his friends help him to accept his duty and Mombi performs her last spell to undo the curse, turning him back into the fairy princess Ozma.

The restored Ozma is established on the throne after Jinjur is captured and her army surrenders. The Tin Woodman invites the Scarecrow to return with him to the Winkie Country along with Jack Pumpkinhead. The Gump is disassembled at his request (though his head was a hunting trophy that can still speak), Glinda returns to her palace in Quadling Country, the Wogglebug remains as Ozma's advisor, and the Sawhorse becomes Ozma's personal steed. The forgotten prophecy is finally fulfilled and Oz is politically whole once more, with Ozma in her rightful position as the child Queen of Oz.

== Themes ==
Women's rights is a primary theme of the book. The kingdom that Princess Ozma and Glinda establish is a fictional manifestation of the "matriarchate" that is described in the written works of activist Matilda Joslyn Gage (Baum's mother-in-law), who has also been cited as a major influence on the Oz stories.

== Adaptations ==
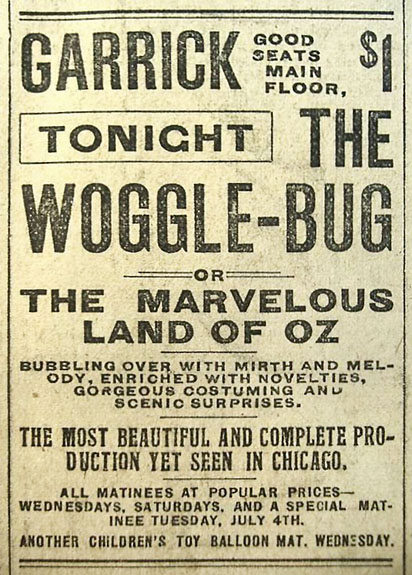
1905 advertisement in the Chicago Record Herald

=== Stage ===
The Wonderful Wizard of Oz had been transformed into a stage play in 1902, and several elements of the sequel book were clearly incorporated with an eye to it also being adapted for the stage. The Marvelous Land of Oz was dedicated to David C. Montgomery and Fred Stone, the comedians "whose clever personations of the Tin Woodman and the Scarecrow have delighted thousands of children throughout the land..." in the popular stage adaptation. Following the Tin Woodman's and the Scarecrow's importance to the play, a similar importance is given to them in the second novel, where neither Dorothy nor the Cowardly Lion appear.

The Marvelous Land of Oz was also influenced by the story and vaudevillian tone of the stage play. The character of the Wizard was in the book a good man though a bad wizard but in the play, the villain of the piece; this is reflected by the evil part he is described as having played in the backstory of The Marvelous Land of Oz.

The two armies of women, both Jinjur's and Glinda's, were so clearly intended as future chorus girls that even reviews of the book noted the similarity. One early reviewer of The Marvelous Land of Oz noted that some details in the book clearly appeared to be designed for stage production—in particular, "General Jinjur and her soldiers are only shapely chorus girls." Since the stage adaptation of The Wonderful Wizard of Oz had been a huge hit, with two companies still touring the country as the second book was published, the reviewer's suspicion was both natural and accurate.

It has also been suggested that the twist of Tip being the Princess Ozma also reflects stage traditions, as Tip would have likely been played by a woman in drag.

Baum had wanted Fred Stone and David Montgomery to reprise their roles as the Scarecrow and Tin Woodman for the second show, but the two refused, fearing typecasting, and the characters were omitted completely from the play. Instead, Baum adapted the book for the stage as The Woggle-Bug, produced in Chicago the summer of 1905. The musical score was composed by Frederic Chapin, and Fred Mace played the Woggle-Bug. The play was not successful and has not been published, though it has been preserved on microfilm. Its songs were published, and a collected volume was published by Hungry Tiger Press in 2001.

=== Film ===
In addition to being part of the basis for Baum's The Fairylogue and Radio-Plays, Land of Oz is the final 1910 Selig Polyscope Oz film, and has been brought to the screen several additional times.

The Land of Oz, a Sequel to the Wizard of Oz is a two-reel production by the Meglin Kiddies made in 1931 and released in 1932. The film was recovered, but the soundtrack of the second reel is missing.

The Wonderful Land of Oz (1969) is a studio-bound production from independent filmmaker Barry Mahon and stars his son, Channy, as Tip. Mahon had previously produced nudie films; however, those films were made in New York, while Oz was made in Florida, and neither Caroline Berner (as General Jinjur) nor the rest of her army were drawn from his former casts.

Filmation's Journey Back to Oz (1972) is essentially an uncredited retelling of The Marvelous Land of Oz, replacing the army of revolt with green elephants and Tip with Dorothy, voiced by Judy Garland's daughter, Liza Minnelli.

Elements from this novel and the following one, Ozma of Oz, were incorporated into the 1985 film Return to Oz featuring Fairuza Balk as Dorothy.

=== Television ===
The story was dramatized on the TV series The Shirley Temple Show in a one-hour program, The Land of Oz, broadcast on September 18, 1960, with a notable cast including Shirley Temple as Tip and Ozma, Agnes Moorehead as Mombi the witch, Sterling Holloway as Jack Pumpkinhead, Ben Blue as the Scarecrow, Gil Lamb as the Tin Woodman, and Mel Blanc as the voice of the Saw-Horse. Although the adaptation was faithful overall, much of the plot had to be sacrificed to fit the story into a one-hour time slot, and Dr. Nikidik was added to the storyline and refashioned into a lord (played by Jonathan Winters).

The 1983 stop-motion cartoon W krainie czarnoksiężnika Oza (In the Land of the Wizard of Oz) combined the adaptation of The Wonderful Wizard of Oz and The Marvelous Land of Oz in 13 episodes.

The novel was adapted in the 1986 TV series Ozu no Mahōtsukai.

The Land of Oz was also adapted as two episodes of the 2000 Russian animated series Adventures of the Emerald City: The intrigues of old Mombi and Princess Ozma.

Elements of the 2007 Sci Fi miniseries Tin Man also borrow from this book as much as it did The Wonderful Wizard of Oz. The protagonist, like Tip/Ozma, is a lost princess sent away from The O.Z. and magically altered to forget much of her previous existence.

=== Audiobook ===
Ray Bolger recorded an audio adaptation of The Land of Oz. This was the third in a series of four audiotapes, The Oz Audio Collection, recorded by Bolger and issued by Caedmon Audio from 1976-1983.

=== Comics ===
The story was also adapted in comic book form by Marvel Comics; once in 1975 in the Marvel Treasury of Oz series, and again in an eight issue series with the first issue being released in November 2009.

=== Game ===
In 1985, the Windham Classics text adventure game The Wizard of Oz adapted much of the plot of this book, however it did not include the bespelled Ozma. At the story's conclusion Tip is crowned King of Oz.

=== Later novel ===
Gregory Maguire's novel Out of Oz (fourth and final volume of The Wicked Years) incorporates many plot elements of The Marvelous Land of Oz.

The Oz books
Previous book: The Wonderful Wizard of Oz	The Marvelous Land of Oz; 1904	Next book: Ozma of Oz
