= Ozma of Oz =

1907 novel by L. Frank Baum

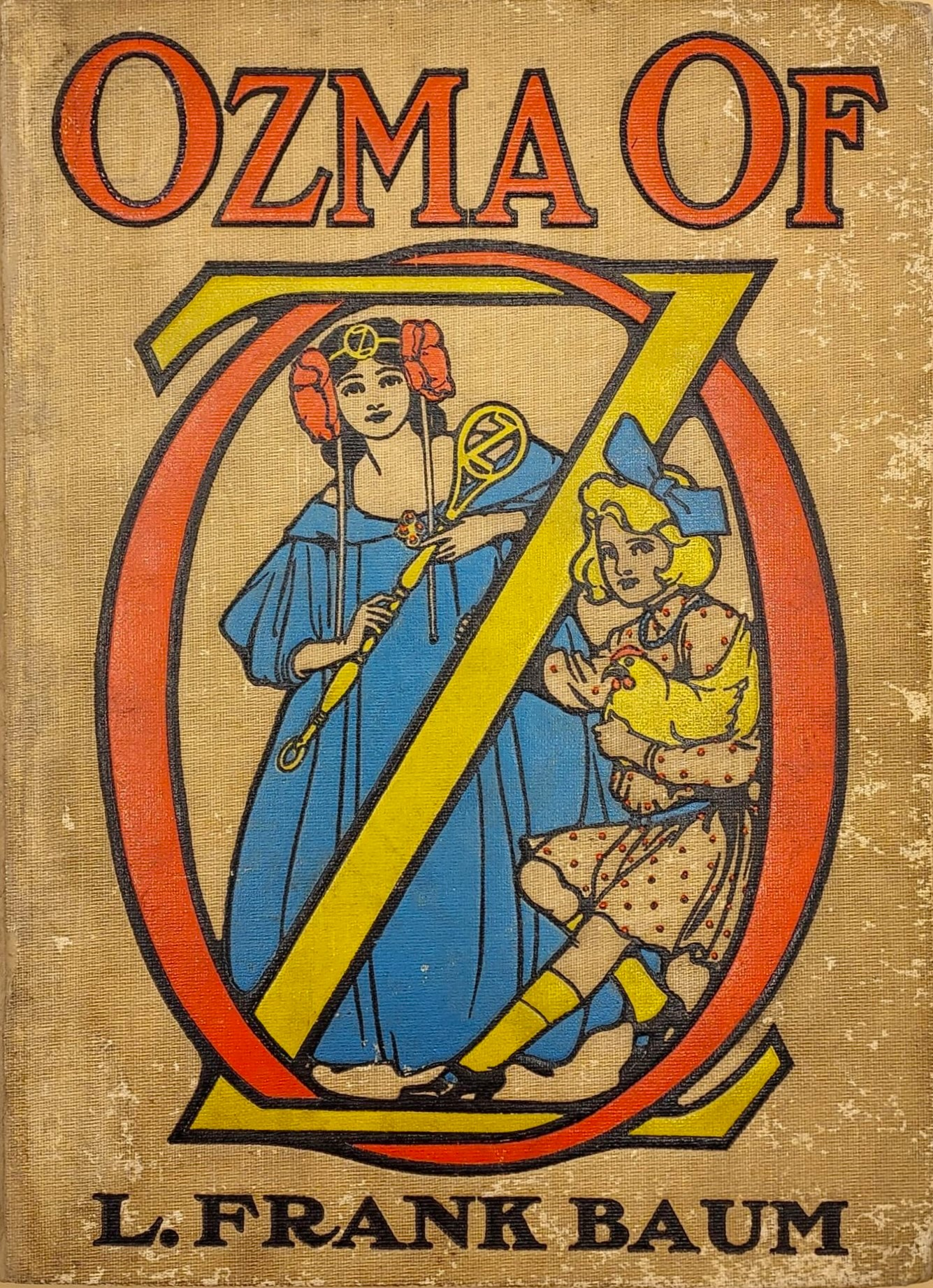
- First edition cover
- Author: L. Frank Baum
- Illustrator: John R. Neill
- Language: English
- Series: The Oz books
- Genre: Children's novel
- Publisher: Reilly & Britton
- Publication date: July 30, 1907
- Publication place: United States
- Media type: Print (hardcover)
- Pages: 270
- Preceded by: The Marvelous Land of Oz
- Followed by: Dorothy and the Wizard in Oz
- Text: Ozma of Oz at Wikisource

Ozma of Oz is the third book of L. Frank Baum's Oz series, published in 1907. The full title of the first edition read Ozma of Oz: A Record of Her Adventures with Dorothy Gale of Kansas, Billina the Yellow Hen, the Scarecrow, the Tin Woodman, the Cowardly Lion and the Hungry Tiger; Besides Other Good People Too Numerous to Mention Faithfully Recorded Herein. The book was illustrated throughout in color by artist John R. Neill.

== Plot summary ==
On an ocean voyage with her uncle Henry to Australia, Dorothy is blown into the sea by a storm. She takes refuge on a floating chicken-coop, which washes ashore, along with the coop and a hen in it. The hen is able to speak; Dorothy gives it the name "Billina". Exploring the land, Dorothy and Billina are menaced by a tribe of brightly dressed "Wheelers", who have wheels instead of hands and feet. They also find a clockwork man named Tik-Tok (one of the first intelligent humanoid automata in literature), who joins them.

Tik-Tok informs Dorothy and Billina that they are in the Land of Ev, which currently has no competent ruler, its king having committed suicide after selling his family to the Nome King. The three visit the castle of Princess Langwidere, who has many exchangeable, detachable heads. When Dorothy refuses to let Langwidere take her head and add it to her collection, Langwidere has a tantrum and locks Dorothy in a high tower within the palace.

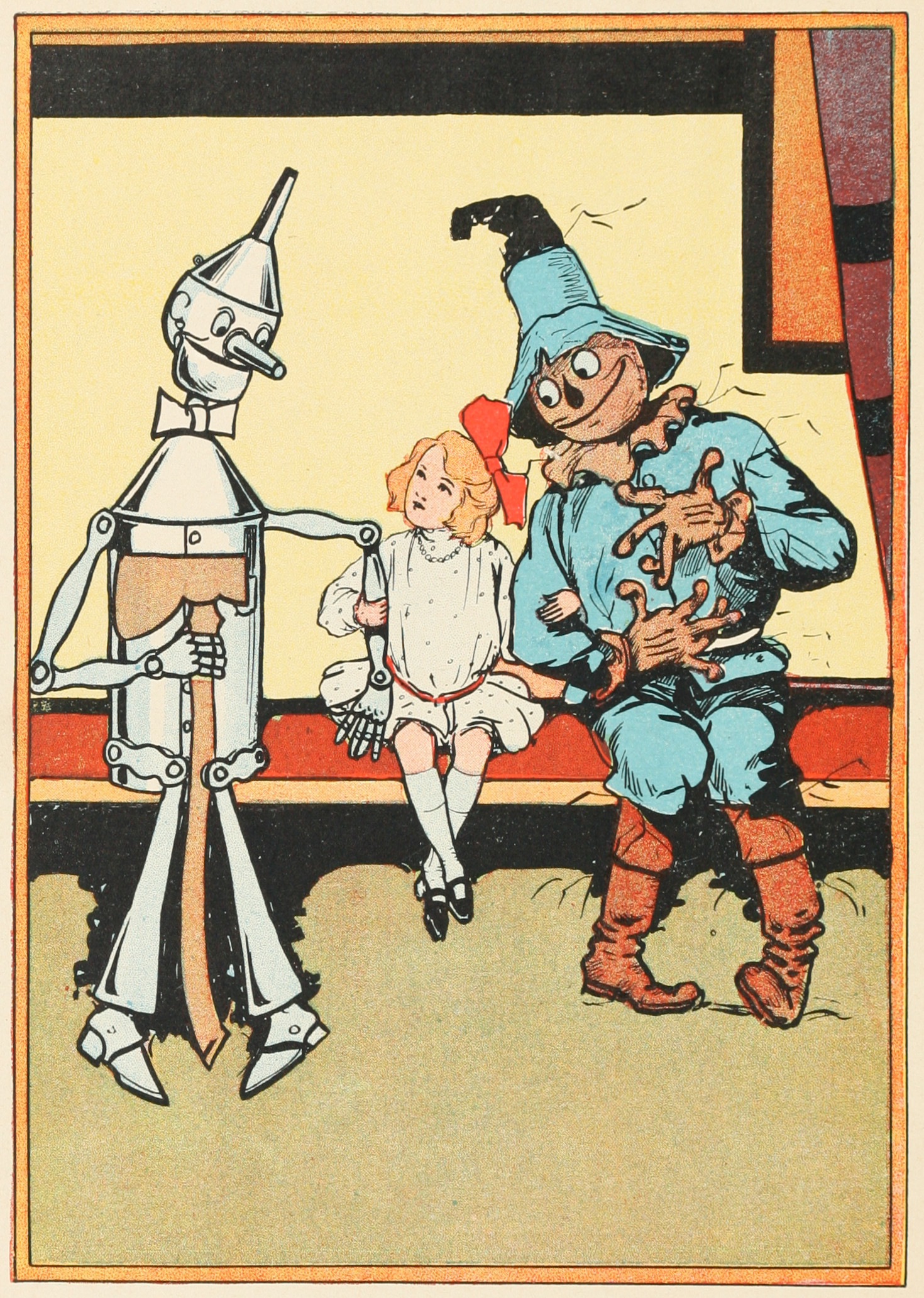
A color illustration from the book

Luckily, Princess Ozma and her Royal Court of Oz (many of whom appeared in the two previous Oz books) just happen to cross over the Deadly Desert on a mission to free the royal family from the Nome King. Upon arriving, Ozma takes charge and has Dorothy, Billina and Tik-Tok released from Langwidere's custody. The three join Ozma's expedition to the Kingdom of the Nomes.

When they arrive, the Nome King reveals that he has magically transformed the royal family into ornaments. When Ozma asks him to release them, he offers a bargain: the Oz people may enter his chambers and try to guess which of the Nome King's many ornaments they are, but if they fail to guess correctly, they will also become ornaments themselves. Ozma, the Tin Woodman, the twenty-seven soldiers of the Royal Army of Oz, Tik-Tok, and the Scarecrow all suffer this bizarre fate. Dorothy luckily selects one ornament which turns out to be one of the royal family's young princes.

Having overheard the Nome King discussing his transformations with another Nome, Billina knows how to recognize, by color, which ornaments are transformed people. She also knows that the King's magic powers come from the Magic Belt that he wears. She is, therefore, able to free all the transformations. By exploiting the Nomes' fear of eggs, the Oz people are able to capture the magic belt and escape the Nome Kingdom with the royal family of Ev.

After returning the royal family of Ev to their throne, Ozma, Dorothy, and the others finally return to the country of Oz where a great victory celebration is held in the Emerald City's royal palace. Dorothy is officially made a Princess of Oz, Billina elects to remain in Oz, and Ozma uses the magic belt to send Dorothy to Australia where she is happily reunited with her Uncle Henry.

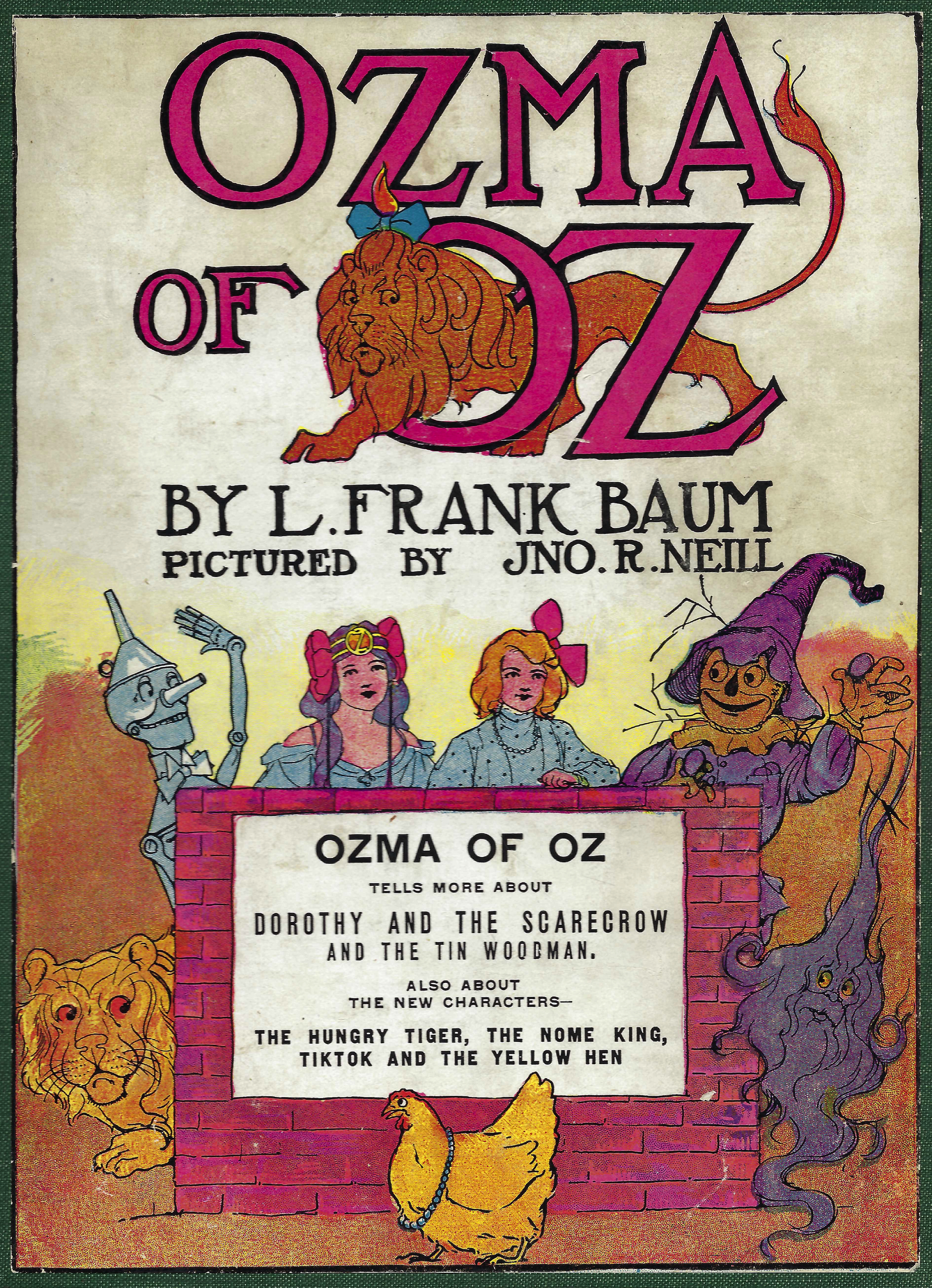
Original dust jacket art

== Themes ==
This is the first Oz book where the majority of the action takes place outside of the Land of Oz. Only the final two chapters take place in Oz itself. This reflects a subtle change in theme: in the first book, Oz is the dangerous land through which Dorothy must win her way back to Kansas; in the third, Oz is the end and aim of the book. Dorothy's desire to return home is not as desperate as in the first book, and it is her uncle's need for her rather than hers for him that makes her return. This is the first book to mention Dorothy's last name, Gale.

== Adaptations ==
L. Frank Baum revisited this story for the plot of his 1913 musical The Tik-Tok Man of Oz, starring James C. Morton and Fred Woodward. Aside from Tik-Tok, a princess named Ozma, and a visit to the Nome King's domain, the similarities between the book and the finished play were minimal, allowing Baum to re-adapt the latter as the eighth Oz book, Tik-Tok of Oz, in 1914.

A theatrical adaptation called Ozma of Oz: A Tale of Time, written by Susan Zeder with music by Richard Gray, premiered at the Poncho Theatre in Seattle, Washington, in 1979. On its 20th anniversary in 1999, it was revived with the addition of further songs and titled, Time Again in Oz.

Elements from Ozma of Oz and the previous novel, The Marvelous Land of Oz, were incorporated into the 1985 film Return to Oz, featuring Fairuza Balk as Dorothy. Although most of the plot was taken from Ozma, the action was chiefly relocated to the derelict Emerald City, ruled by Princess Mombi (Princess Langwidere in all but name, as well as keeping Ozma as her slave) and her Wheelers. In the second half of the film, Dorothy, Billina, Tik-Tok, Jack Pumpkinhead, and the Gump travel to the Nome King's mountain, to rescue the Scarecrow from the King's ornament collection, his item form being emerald green, unlike the book's royal purple. The 1939 film's famous ruby slippers were used in place of the Magic Belt.

The 1986 anime adaptation of the first novel included this story. It was later shortened and edited into a single feature for United States VHS and LaserDisc (and later DVD) release.

The book was also made into a Canadian animated feature film in 1987 called Dorothy Meets Ozma of Oz. It is a condensed version, running only 28 minutes. A video release features a live introduction by actor Michael Gross.

The Oz books
Previous book: The Marvelous Land of Oz	Ozma of Oz; 1907	Next book: Dorothy and the Wizard in Oz
