= Glass Cat =

Fictional character from L. Frank Baum's Oz-series

Bungle
- Oz character
- Bungle, the Glass Cat
- First appearance: The Patchwork Girl of Oz (1913)
- Created by: L. Frank Baum

In-universe information
- Species: Enchanted glass ornament
- Gender: Female
- Occupation: Lives in the palace at the Emerald City as a guest of Ozma of Oz
- Nationality: Munchkin

Bungle, the Glass Cat is a character in the Oz books of L. Frank Baum. More prominently featured in Baum's latter books, the Glass Cat often is depicted as using her unique characteristics to the benefit of her companions. Bungle was not well-liked by other inhabitants of Oz due to her self-absorption, but she is suggested to be less uncaring than she appears. Like other Oz characters, Bungle serves to blur the line between person and animal, object and living being, having been described as more intelligent than a typical cat with brains above her station in life.

== Development ==
Baum was unusual in creating a character that is transparent but visible. In a story published twelve years prior to Bungle's debut, American Fairy Tales, Baum magically animates a similar spun-glass animal, although the dog is not transparent but pink, with a blue ribbon around its neck and shiny black glass eyes.

Bungle along with the other new characters in The Patchwork Girl of Oz represented a shift away from the static cast of characters featured in previous Oz books. However, upon encountering the previous cast of Baum's Oz, Bungle and the Woozy are removed from the journey to be replaced by Dorothy and the Scarecrow.

== Characteristics ==
The Glass Cat is described as transparent, except for her hard blood-red ruby heart, two large emeralds for eyes, and her bright pink brains, which look rather like a collection of marbles and can be seen working in the cat's head. She has a tail of spun-glass.

An example of the Glass Cat's invulnerability is its ability to walk across lakebeds unharmed.

Despite being made of glass and fearing being broken, the Cat is shown to be virtually invulnerable to harm, which is a great advantage in her various adventures. For instance, she is shown to be immune to the violent attacks of the various beasts of Oz.

In personality, Bungle is almost stereotypically catlike—cool and reserved and aloof as well as vain. The cat "is so determined not to show emotion that when implored to bring help she sets off very slowly and runs only when out of sight."

Through her incessant prowling throughout the Land of Oz, however, the Glass Cat is portrayed as having acquired intimate knowledge of its complex terrain; and she is generally willing to exploit this knowledge to the benefit of Dorothy and her friends.

== History ==
Bungle first appears in The Patchwork Girl of Oz, the seventh of Baum's fourteen Oz books. The magician Dr. Pipt tests his Powder of Life by animating an ornamental glass cat figurine, for the specific purpose of catching mice for his wife Margolotte. But the Glass Cat turns out to be exceptionally vain, and unwilling to do any work. Margolotte names it Bungle, in reference to the magician's failure to create a useful mouser.

Accompanying Ojo on his journey, the Cat aids the boy by leading him to shelter in pitch darkness using her night vision. Once they reach the Emerald City, she opts to stay behind for fear of being shattered.

During her stay, it is quickly reasoned that it was Bungle's pink brains that had made her so conceited, and at the end of The Patchwork Girl of Oz, the Wizard of Oz replaces them with clear ones to make her more agreeable. After her adventures in that book with Ojo the Lucky and the Patchwork Girl, the Cat ends up being a pet of Princess Ozma in the Emerald City. But in The Magic of Oz, a few books later, her brains were pink again and her original personality had returned, including her catch phrase about the superiority of her brains: "They're pink, and you can see 'em work."

At the end of the story, the Glass Cat is admired by the titular monarch, in Rinkitink of Oz.

In The Magic of Oz, the Glass Cat guides the rescue party that saves Trot and Cap'n Bill from entrapment on the Magic Isle.

When Button Bright gets lost in an area of Oz inhabited by dangerous animals, during the events of Glinda of Oz, the Glass Cat retrieves him, relying on her invulnerability to protect her.

== Interpretation and Analysis ==
In the hierarchy of different castes featured in Baum's Oz, the Glass Cat can be considered an "inorganic inanimate" as her constituent material was never alive and unmoving in nature. This is in contrast to creatures like the Sawhorse that were made of material that was once alive.

The Glass Cat as a living ornament that defies its fate, has been thought to mirror the growing multiculturalism of contemporary society and the corresponding ability to self-actualize regardless of origins.

Andrew Karp argues that Bungle's mockery of the Patchwork Girl's characteristics while remaining prideful of her own unusual appearance, is intended to highlight the absurdity of an individual or insular group imposing standards of conduct and appearance on others.

Dina Schiff Massachi notes that the Glass Cat regrets having been brought to life, that despite wanting to be more than a servant, by ignoring her purpose of catching mice she takes on the life of a mere ornament. Due to her self-prescribed purpose, she attempts to reinforce her identity through narcissistic obsession. Thus, her brains, the source of the vanity, are useless by the standards of Oz and must be replaced for her to be socially acceptable. In contrast to the Patchwork Girl who is emancipated while maintaining her eccentricities, Bungle elevates herself to a prize collectable.

The Glass Cat's intended role as a servant and the Magician's intention to make a new, obedient cat with neither brains nor heart can be seen to represent the conflict between the control inherent to servitude and a servant's desires.

Within the context of The Patchwork Girl of Oz, the Glass Cat may be a representation of Baum's disdain for elitist forms of artistic expression. Under this interpretation, the Glass Cat is a foil of the Patchwork Girl, the pair embodying monologic formalist and polyphonic postmodernist approaches to art, respectively.

== Oz Books and Short Stories Featuring Bungle ==
Although never a main character in the Oz books considered canonical by Oz enthusiasts, Bungle has captured a number of author's imaginations and appeared more prominently in later publications.

By L. Frank Baum:

- The Patchwork Girl of Oz (1913)
- The Magic of Oz (1919)
- Glinda of Oz (1920)

By other authors:

- The Wonderland of Oz, The Funnies - Appeared in issues through May 1939 to February 1940. In this adaptation, she is better liked by her companions and her brains are not removed.
- Bungle and the Magic Lantern of Oz (1992) - A story by Greg Gick with Bungle as the protagonist.
- The Glass Cat of Oz (1997) - David Hulan makes Bungle his protagonist in The Glass Cat of Oz.
- The Ruby Heart (1999) - Michael O. Riley also breaks the Cat, in two pieces, in his short story "The Ruby Heart."
- The Blue Witch of Oz (2000) - Eric Shanower employs the Glass Cat in his 1992 graphic novel The Blue Witch of Oz.
- The Hidden Prince of Oz (2000) - Gina Wickwar features the character in her The Hidden Prince of Oz.
- Cinderella: Fables are Forever (2012) - The cat also makes an appearance in the Fables spin-off Cinderella: Fables are Forever, working with Dorothy Gale.
- Bungle of Oz (2013) - A novella with Bungle as the protagonist on an adventure in Gillikin Country and the Land of Ev. Bungle interacts with other Oz characters in the book including the Jinnicky the Red Jinn, the gravel men, and Jellia Jamb.

Brief appearances:

- Rinkitink in Oz (1916)
- The Lost Princess of Oz (1917) - After losing his growl, Toto worries about what he'll do when he sees the Glass Cat and Eureka.
- The Royal Book of Oz (1921) - Mentioned alongside the other animals of Oz.
- The Cowardly Lion of Oz (1923) - Bungle argues with Toto over the Patchwork Girl's verses.

== Others ==
Bungle appears in "Welcome to the Bungle" in Dorothy and the Wizard of Oz. Unlike her book counterpart, Bungle acts like a real cat as she chases a mouse around Emerald City.

A similar glass cat named Grimalkin appears in Gregory Maguire's novel Wicked: The Life and Times of the Wicked Witch of the West.

== Gallery ==
Illustration of Bungle the Glass Cat in The Patchwork Girl of Oz.

Illustration of the Glass Cat in The Magic of Oz.

Illustration of the Glass Cat in Glinda of Oz.
