= The Patchwork Girl of Oz =

1913 novel by L. Frank Baum

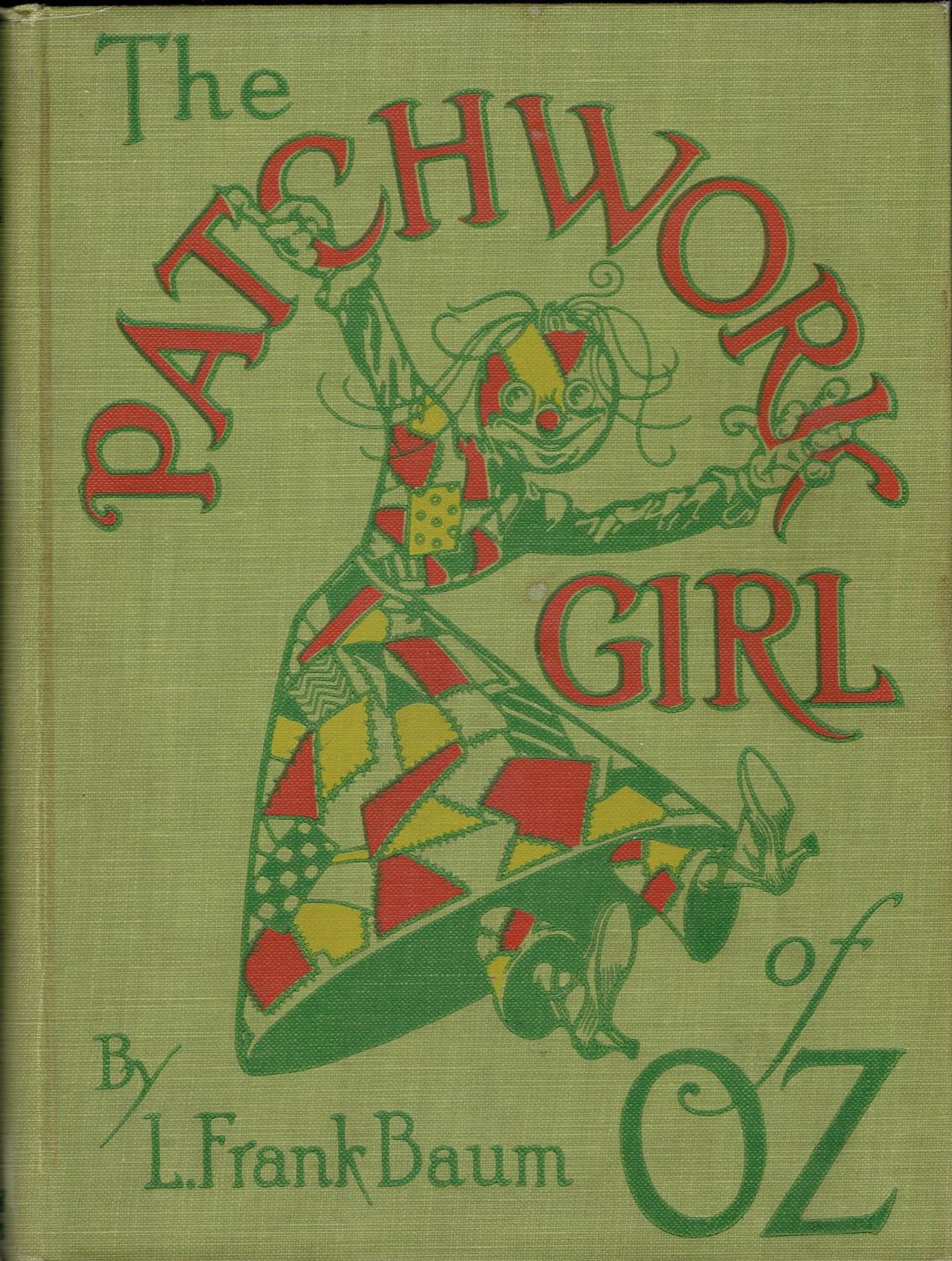
- First edition cover
- Author: L. Frank Baum
- Illustrator: John R. Neill
- Language: English
- Series: The Oz books
- Genre: Children's novel
- Publisher: Reilly & Britton
- Publication date: 1913
- Publication place: United States
- Media type: Print (hardcover)
- Preceded by: The Emerald City of Oz
- Followed by: Tik-Tok of Oz

The Patchwork Girl of Oz is the seventh book in L. Frank Baum's Oz series. Characters include the Woozy, Ojo "the Unlucky", Unc Nunkie, Dr. Pipt, Scraps (the patchwork girl), and others. The novel was first published on July 1, 1913, with illustrations by John R. Neill. In 1914, Baum adapted the book to film through his Oz Film Manufacturing Company. The book was followed by Tik-Tok of Oz (1914).

In the previous Oz book, The Emerald City of Oz, magic was used to isolate Oz from all contact with the outside world. Baum did this to end the Oz series, but was forced to restart the series with this book due to financial hardship. In the prologue, he reconciles Oz's isolation with the appearance of a new Oz book by explaining that he contacted Dorothy in Oz via a wireless telegraph, and she obtained Ozma's permission to tell Baum this story.

== Plot ==
Ojo, known as Ojo the Unlucky, lives in poverty with his laconic uncle Unc Nunkie in the woods of the Munchkin Country in Oz. They visit their neighbor, the magician Dr. Pipt who is about to complete the six-year process of preparing the magical Powder of Life, which can bring inanimate objects to life. Pipt's wife has constructed a life-sized stuffed girl out of patchwork, and she wishes her husband to animate her to serve as an obedient household servant. They also meet another of Pipt's creations, Bungle, an extremely vain talking cat made of glass. The Powder of Life successfully animates the patchwork girl, but an accident causes both Pipt's wife and Unc Nunkie to be turned to stone. Dr. Pipt tells Ojo that he must obtain five ingredients to make a compound to counteract the petrifaction spell.

The Woozy, Ojo, Scraps, and Bungle in an illustration by John R. Neill

Ojo and the patchwork girl (who names herself Scraps), along with Bungle, embark on a journey to obtain the magic ingredients: a six-leaved clover, the wing of a yellow butterfly, water from a dark well, a drop of oil from a live man's body, and three hairs from a Woozy's tail. Scraps exhibits a wild, carefree personality, and she is prone to spontaneous recitation of nonsense poetry. After several adventures, they meet a Woozy, a blocky quadruped who agrees to let them have three hairs from its tail—but they are unable to remove the hairs, so they take the Woozy along with them.

The party is captured by large animate plants, but they are rescued by the fortuitous arrival of the Shaggy Man. He leads them to the Emerald City to meet Princess Ozma, but warns Ojo that picking a six-leaved clover is forbidden by law in Oz. Along the way they meet the Scarecrow, who is quite smitten with Scraps, as she is with him. Just outside the Emerald City, Ojo sees a six-leaved clover by the road and, believing himself to be unobserved, picks it. When they arrive at the city gates, the Soldier with the Green Whiskers approaches them and announces that Ojo is under arrest.

Brought to trial before Ozma, Ojo confesses and Ozma pardons him and allows him to keep the clover. Dorothy and the Scarecrow join Ojo and Scraps as they continue their search for the remaining ingredients. Along the way they meet Jack Pumpkinhead, the playful but annoying Tottenhots, and the man-eating 21-foot-tall giant Mr. Yoop, before reaching the subterranean dwellings of the Hoppers, who each have just one leg, and the neighboring Horners, who each have one horn on their head. The two groups are on the verge of war due to a misunderstanding, but Scraps reconciles them. A grateful Horner leads the group to a well in a dark radium mine, and Ojo collects a flask of water from it.

The group continues to the castle of the Tin Woodman who rules the Winkie Country, since yellow butterflies can be found only in that yellow-dominated quadrant of Oz. While talking to the Tin Woodman, Ojo notices a drop of oil about to drip from his body, and he catches it in a vial. He explains that he now has all the ingredients except one; however, when he describes the last one, the Tin Woodman is horrified at the idea of killing an innocent butterfly, and forbids them from doing so in his realm. Ojo is devastated, but the Tin Woodman proposes that they all travel back to the Emerald City to ask Ozma's advice.

Ozma tells them that Dr. Pipt has been practicing magic illegally and has therefore been deprived of his powers. But the petrified Unc Nunkie and Pipt's wife have been brought to the Emerald City and, as they all watch, the Wizard of Oz restores them to life. Ojo and Unc Nunkie are given a new house to live in near the Emerald City and the Tin Woodman renames Ojo "Ojo the Lucky".

== Principal character ==
Scraps is a living rag doll made of patchwork, button eyes, brown yarn hair, a felt tongue, and pearl teeth. She was originally brought to life by a Munchkin magician named Dr. Pipt by means of his Powder of Life formula to be a servant for his wife Margolotte. Ojo overloaded her with magic brains in the process of bringing her to life, and as she happily jumped around she accidentally spilled the Liquid of Petrifaction on Mrs. Pipt and Ojo's uncle, consequently turning them to stone. Much of their first adventure is gathering the ingredients to find a counterspell. She later became the companion of the Scarecrow who found her quite beautiful.

The character had significant roles in such Oz books as The Gnome King of Oz and The Wonder City of Oz, and was the title character in A Runaway in Oz. In Return to Oz, she is seen in the background at Princess Ozma's coronation.

The character's popularity led to her being featured in at least two print advertisements for school desks issued by American Seating Company.

== Background ==
In reference to The Patchwork Girl of Oz, one of Baum's letters to his publisher, Sumner Britton of Reilly & Britton, offers unusual insight on Baum's manner of creating his Oz fantasies:

A lot of thought is required on one of these fairy tales. The odd characters are a sort of inspiration, liable to strike me at any time, but the plot and plan of adventures takes me considerable time ... I live with it day by day, jotting down on odd slips of paper the various ideas that occur and in this way getting my materials together. The new Oz book is at this stage. ... But ... it's a long way from being ready for the printer yet. I must rewrite it, stringing the incidents into consecutive order, elaborating the characters, etc. Then it's typewritten. Then it's revised, retypewritten and sent on to Reilly and Britton.

The same correspondence (November 23–27, 1912) discusses the deleted Chapter 21 of the book, "The Garden of Meats". The text of the chapter has not survived, but Neill's illustrations and their captions still exist. The deleted chapter dealt with a race of vegetable people comparable to the Mangaboos in Chapters 4–6 of Dorothy and the Wizard in Oz. The vegetable people grow what Baum elsewhere calls "meat people", apparently for food; Neill's pictures show plants with the heads of human children (Note: Bodiless human heads are rather a pre-occupation with Baum; they occur repeatedly in his fantasies, Ozma of Oz, Chapter 6 and The Tin Woodman of Oz, Chapter 18 being two examples.) being watered by their growers. (This is thematically connected with the anthropophagous plants in Chapter 10 of Patchwork Girl.) Frank Reilly tactfully wrote to Baum that the material was not "in harmony with your other fairy stories", and would generate "considerable adverse criticism". Baum saw his point; the chapter was dropped.

The depiction of Patchwork Girl may have been influenced by the character of Topsy in Uncle Tom's Cabin, and in turn may have influenced the character of Raggedy Ann.

At least at one point in his life, Baum stated that he considered The Patchwork Girl of Oz "one of the two best books of my career", the other being The Sea Fairies. The book was a popular success, selling just over 17,000 copies—though this was somewhat lower than the total for the previous book, The Emerald City of Oz, and marked the start of a trend in declining sales for the Oz books that did not reverse until The Tin Woodman of Oz in 1918.

== Reception ==
While Baum's work as a whole is occasionally criticized for using what may be seen as racial and ethnic stereotypes, the Patchwork Girl has come under particular scrutiny. Robin Bernstein suggests that the character of Scraps was inspired by Topsy in Uncle Tom's Cabin and points out she was created by Dr. Pipt's wife to be a slave. Moreover, the original text included a song (by the similarly animated Phonograph) about "mah coal black Lulu"; the lyric, evocative of minstrelsy, was changed in later editions to "my cross-eyed Lulu". Similarly problematic is the inclusion in the book of a set of creatures called the Tottenhots, likely meant to be a play on the ethnic term Hottentots.

== Adaptations ==
Baum wrote and produced a film based on the book, titled The Patchwork Girl of Oz. It was made by Baum's studio The Oz Film Manufacturing Company and was released in 1914. Baum was not able to find a woman of athleticism suitable to play the role, and therefore cast the male French acrobat Pierre Couderc.

Baum also wrote a musical stage adaptation of the book, circa 1913, with composer Louis F. Gottschalk; however, this musical was never staged. Excerpts have occasionally been performed at annual conventions of The International Wizard of Oz Club.

A 2005 film adaptation of the novel, produced by Thundertoad Animation directed by Steve Young, more widely rereleased in 2019 and said to be a 2019 film on letterboxd and other sources, featured Cyndi Hotopp in the title role. This version includes large blocks of Baum's text in the dialogue; however, the Horners' use of radium, discovered to be deadly less than a decade after the novel was written, is replaced with a fictitious substance.

The character of Scraps has also been featured in a variety of television productions. The character was portrayed by Doreen Tracy on the 4th Anniversary episode of Disneyland, which aired in 1957. In the 1996 animated series The Oz Kids, she was voiced by Lori Alan and was depicted as the parent of numerous infant patchwork kids. The character was featured in the unaired television pilot Lost in Oz, under the name of Serena. In this version, the character is depicted as extremely athletic and looks like a pale human with dark hair, but is revealed to be made of fabric underneath. She is a supporting character in the 2017 animated series, Dorothy and the Wizard of Oz, voiced by Jessica DiCicco.

In the 2009 computer game, Emerald City Confidential, Scraps is presented as the owner of a general store. She is also part of Frogman's smuggling ring.

In the 1982 stage play, Talking With..., the second monologue is about a housewife who dresses up as Scraps to escape her mundane life.

== Notes ==
The Oz books
Previous book: The Emerald City of Oz	The Patchwork Girl of Oz; 1913	Next book: Tik-Tok of Oz
