= List of Oz characters (created by Baum) =

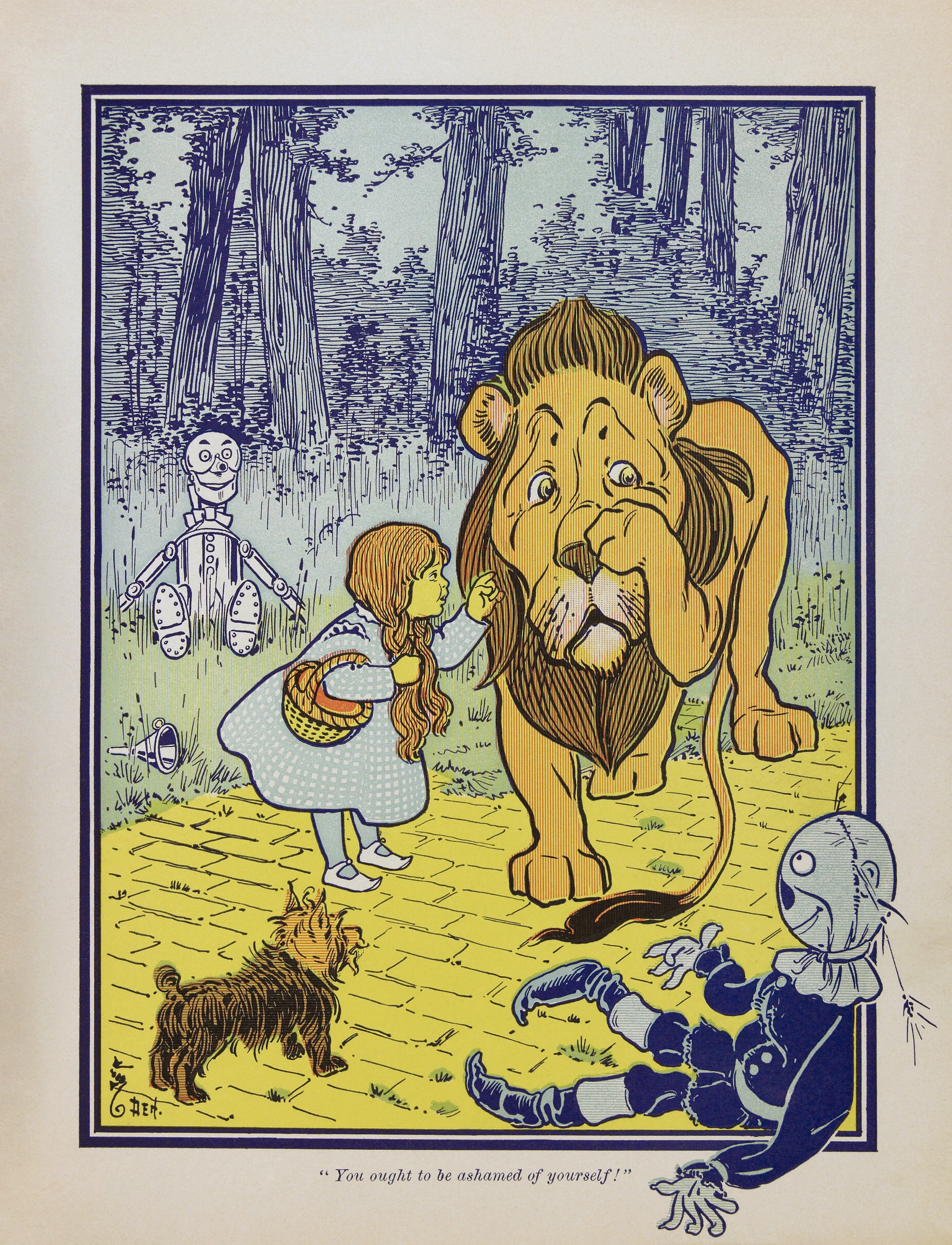
Some of the major characters from Baum's first book The Wonderful Wizard of Oz (1900) from left to right; Tin Woodman, Toto, Dorothy Gale, Cowardly Lion, and Scarecrow

This is a list of characters in the original Oz books by American author L. Frank Baum. The majority of characters listed here unless noted otherwise have appeared in multiple books under various plotlines. Oz is made up of four divisions that surround the Emerald City in the center. The country as a whole was originally enchanted by a character named Queen Lurline, who is described in the Oz backstory. Additional characters were added in regions surrounding the Land of Oz (beyond the deserts) as the series progressed.

== Aunt Em and Uncle Henry ==
Aunt Em and Uncle Henry appear in The Wonderful Wizard of Oz (1900). They are Dorothy Gale's guardian aunt and uncle. They live a joyless and gray life on a small farm on the prairies of Kansas. Neither of them believe their niece when she tells them she has been to the Land of Oz; they consider her a mere dreamer, as her dead mother had been. This changes when the two later face foreclosure on their farm. Dorothy arranges with Princess Ozma to bring them to Oz, so that they can escape their bleak fates and be safe and finally content. Eventually, in The Emerald City of Oz (1910), they move permanently to Oz and take up jobs there.

== Betsy Bobbin ==
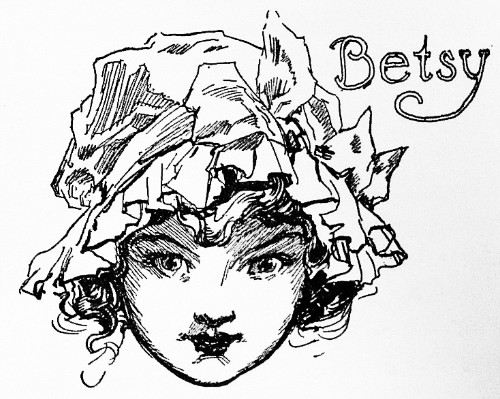
Betsy Bobbin

Betsy Bobbin is a fictional character in L. Frank Baum's Land of Oz. Betsy is portrayed with various hair colors throughout the series; in her initial appearances her hair was colored as blonde, strawberry blonde or light brown. Later appearances depicted her as brunette or with auburn hair. Betsy first appears in Baum's 1913 stage play The Tik-Tok Man of Oz, and then in his 1914 novel Tik-Tok of Oz (partly a novelization of the play), wherein she teams up with the Shaggy Man and together they go to the Nome King's Caverns.

In the book series, Betsy arrives to Oz from Oklahoma with a mule named Hank, and she is shown as a constant companion of both Dorothy and Trot in the later books. In The Lost Princess of Oz (1917), she is said to be one year older than Dorothy Gale. Betsy is more passive than Dorothy, and in one book she is described as shy. Betsy was later made a Princess of Oz by Ruth Plumly Thompson, and she also appears as the protagonist of Thompson's The Hungry Tiger of Oz (1926) in which she helps a young prince from an Evian kingdom called Rash regain his throne from a wicked uncle.

== Billina ==
Billina is Dorothy's pet hen on the Kansas farm and first appears in the book Ozma of Oz (1907), in which she saves the citizens of Oz from being turned into decor objects by the evil Nome King. She is sassy and talkative; at the conclusion of Ozma of Oz, Billina chooses to stay in Oz and live in the Emerald City's royal palace, later becoming the matriarch of a large colony of chicks. She is a major character in Walt Disney's 1985 live-action film Return to Oz, in which she helps Dorothy save the Land of Oz from near extinction.

== Boq ==
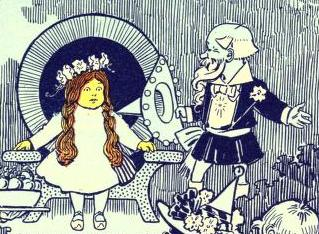
Boq with Dorothy, illustration by W. W. Denslow

Boq is a minor character who appears in the beginning of The Wonderful Wizard of Oz (1900). He is depicted as a wealthy Munchkin man with a large family who offers Dorothy Gale and Toto shelter after throwing a lavish banquet in Dorothy's honor upon her arrival to the Land of Oz as his house was on the Yellow Brick Road path to the Emerald City.

A reimagined version of the character appears in Gregory Maguire's 1995 revisionist parallel novel Wicked, where he is a childhood friend and schoolmate of Elphaba (Maguire's reimagining of the Wicked Witch of the West). Boq is reimagined further in the novel's Broadway musical adaptation where he is made a composite character with the Tin Woodman. In the musical's two-part film adaptation (2024–2025), he is portrayed by Ethan Slater and his character arc is expanded upon, complete with him being given the surname Woodsman.

== Braided Man ==
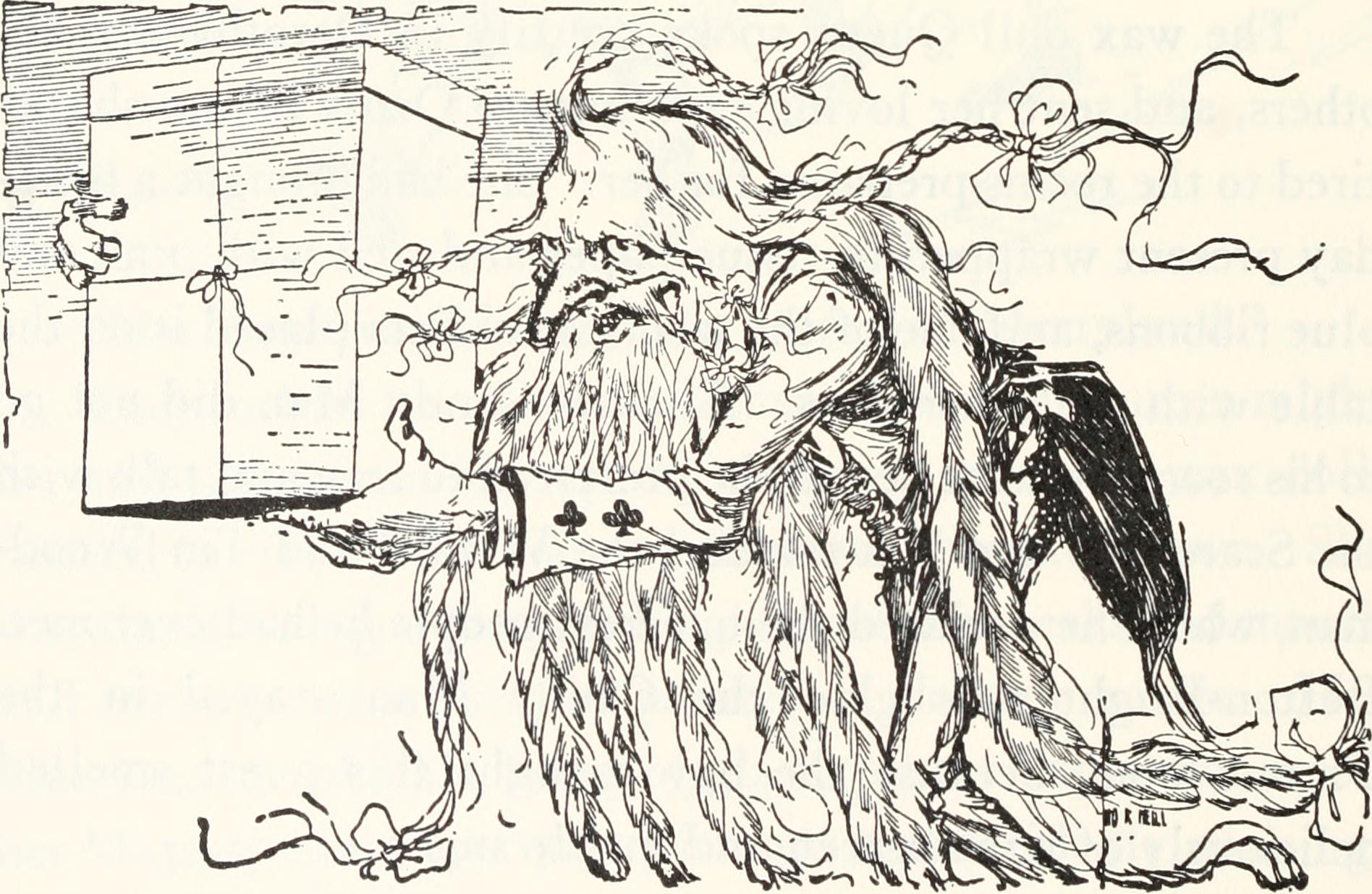
The Braided Man

The Braided Man is a bent-over old man with his hair and beard in braids who lives halfway up Pyramid Mountain. He is a great inventor who used to live on the surface of the Earth where he worked with holes until a big one caused him to fall deep underground where he landed on Pyramid Mountain and lived on its spiral staircase since. Since then, he has amused himself by making Flutters and Rustlers.

He first appears in Dorothy and the Wizard in Oz (1908) where he meets Dorothy and the Wizard of Oz when they arrive at his cave and he gives them some of his products. While he states that there is no use of money on Pyramid Mountain, he does accept Dorothy's blue bow.

In The Road to Oz (1909), the Braided Man appears to have made it back to the surface as he was among the guests at Princess Ozma's birthday party. His present to Princess Ozma is the finest Flutters that he has made.

The Braided Man appears in the 1985 film Return to Oz. He made a background appearance at the coronation of Princess Ozma.

== Bristle ==
Bristle is a white rabbit from Bunnybury who first appears in The Emerald City of Oz (1910). He works as the Keeper of the Wicket which is a name given to the Doorman of Bunnybury. He can only admit visitors with an order or letter of introduction from Ozma of Oz or Glinda the Good. When visitors are admitted, Bristle reduces them to the size of a rabbit before letting them into the village itself.

== Button-Bright ==
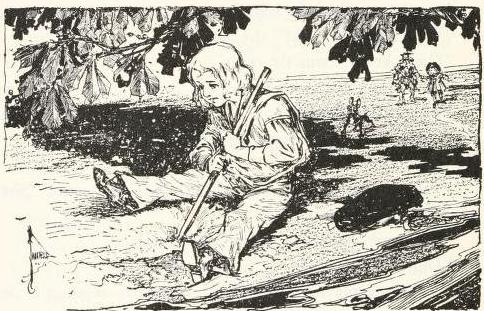
Button-Bright when first encountered by Dorothy, the Shaggy Man, and Toto

Button-Bright (real name: Saladin Paracelsus de Lambertine Evagne von Smith) first appears in the 1909 book The Road to Oz. When Button-Bright first appears, he is shown as a little boy who answers most questions with "Don't know." In the story Button's head is temporarily changed into a fox's head by King Dox of Foxville; upon arriving in the Land of Oz, Billina and Tik-Tok took Button-Bright to the Truth Pond so that he could regain his head. He later makes an appearance at Princess Ozma's birthday party.

Baum brought Button-Bright back for his 1912 novel Sky Island, where he encounters Trot and Cap'n Bill for the first time. In this novel he is shown to be older and more verbal. Button reveals that he is from Philadelphia, and that his real name is Saladin Paracelsus de Lambertine Evagne von Smith. He was given the nickname "Button-Bright" by his parents as his name is rather long, and because they think that he is "bright as a button". In The Scarecrow of Oz (1915), Button-Bright becomes the first American to accidentally emigrate to the Land of Oz.

In the sequel Oz books, he is often the main character in subplots that deal with him getting lost and being found again. In the non-canon stories of March Laumer, Button-Bright is depicted as an adult and married to Glinda. In the Dorothy Must Die multi-volume series, he is married to Polychrome.

Button-Bright appears in the 1985 film Return to Oz in the background at Princess Ozma's coronation.

== Cap'n Bill ==
Cap'n Bill

Cap'n Bill Weedles is a fictional character who first appears in two of Baum's fantasy novels, The Sea Fairies (1911) and Sky Island (1912). Bill was introduced along with his friend Trot; they both later appear in The Scarecrow of Oz (1915) which is the ninth book in the Oz series.

Cap'n Bill Weedles is an ex-sailor with a wooden left leg from the knee down. His head is almost bald and what little hair he has is grizzled. His eyes are pale blue with a gentle look to them, and his face is round, rugged, and bronzed. He has been Trot's companion from birth as he was her mother's star boarder. Formerly he was captain of a schooner with Trot's father as his mate; after losing his leg, the Cap'n retired, and Trot's father was promoted to captain of the same ship.

Cap'n Bill and Trot also play significant roles in the later Oz books The Lost Princess of Oz (1917), The Magic of Oz (1919) and Jack Snow's The Magical Mimics in Oz (1946). Baum borrowed from one of his own earlier characters, Naboth Perkins in Sam Steele's Adventures on Land and Sea (1906), to create Cap'n Bill.

Cap'n Bill appears in the 1985 film Return to Oz, in the background at Princess Ozma's coronation, holding the Magic Flower.

== Cayke ==
Cayke the Cookie Cook is a character who appears in the book The Lost Princess of Oz (1917). She is a Yip, a resident of a remote plateau in Oz who is noted for the delicious cookies she bakes in her diamond-studded gold dishpan. Cayke knows that the dishpan has magic powers; she admits to the Frogman that without it she is a poor cook, and her cookies are "pretty poor stuff and no better than any woman could make who does not own [her] diamond-studded gold dishpan." However, she has no idea that her magic dishpan can carry its occupants anywhere they desire to go. Ugu the shoemaker steals Cayke's dishpan and uses it to kidnap Ozma and steal all the magic in the Land of Oz.

When Cayke discovers her dishpan has gone missing, she is greatly distressed, and causes quite a fuss by wailing and screaming. After the Frogman, who is thought to be extremely wise by all of the Yips, tells her that the dishpan has been stolen by someone outside of the country of the Yips, she leaves the plateau where the Yips live and travels the general land of Oz to find it. This trip makes her the first Yip to leave the plateau. Though the Frogman joins her, she was prepared to go alone, showing her courage and determination. Cayke is a relatively simple woman, but she is honest except when the truth will hurt someone's feelings, and seems to be generally good natured, if a little ill-tempered at times.

According to Cayke, the diamond-studded gold dishpan has been passed down in her family, from her mother and all of her grandmothers since the beginning of time; but its origin is never disclosed. Cayke makes a brief appearance in Jeff Freedman's 1994 novel The Magic Dishpan of Oz (her dishpan plays a much greater role there).

== China Princess ==
The China Princess is a delicate and beautiful figurine made of china who appears in The Wonderful Wizard of Oz (1900). She lives in the tiny hidden enclave called "Dainty China Country" in the Quadling Country of the Land of Oz. She, like all the other china people, cannot leave their enclave or they will become lifeless and stiff.

The China Princess appears in the 2013 film Legends of Oz: Dorothy's Return voiced by Megan Hilty.

== Cowardly Lion ==
The Cowardly Lion is a talking lion who lives in the Land of Oz. He appears in The Wonderful Wizard of Oz (1900) and becomes one of Dorothy Gale's first companions in Oz, joining her and the Scarecrow and Tin Woodman as he is in search of courage. At the end of the book, he becomes King of the Beasts in the dark forest in Oz's southern quadrant called Quadling Country, though this is rarely brought up in later Oz books.

In the sequels, he appears in minor roles as Ozma's bodyguard and beast of burden, along with the Hungry Tiger.

In Ruth Plumly Thompson's The Cowardly Lion of Oz (1923), a lion collector named King Mustafa seeks to capture him, while he seeks to restore his courage.

== Dorothy Gale ==
Dorothy Gale is the main character and adolescent protagonist in The Wonderful Wizard of Oz (1900) and several sequel Oz books. She is a heroic and sweet-tempered orphan girl from a small farm on the prairies of Kansas. Baum never reveals Dorothy's age, but she is thought to be no older than twelve years old. In appearance she is described as having chubby little hands, a round rosy face, big earnest eyes filled with awe and a merry laugh. She has a small pet dog Toto, whom she loves dearly. After her first adventure in the Land of Oz, she returns to Kansas via the charmed Silver Shoes (Ruby Slippers in the classic MGM musical of 1939) she obtained while there but lost between worlds when she was teleported back. Not much later, she unexpectedly returns to Oz again, thus having several more adventures before permanently settling there as an official princess of Oz in the book The Emerald City of Oz (1910).

== Dr. Pipt ==
Dr. Pipt is sometimes called the Crooked Magician. He first appears in The Patchwork Girl of Oz (1913). He is so crooked that his legs are nearly as handy as his arms. When he sits, one knee is under his chin and the other behind his back. Dr. Pipt lives in the Munchkin Country with his wife Margolotte. He is notable for creating the Patchwork Girl (who was created by Dr. Pipt's wife, Margolotte) and the Glass Cat.

Dr. Pipt also invented the Powder of Life (although in the 1904 novel The Marvelous Land of Oz this invention is credited to another crooked magician named Dr. Nikidik). In an article in the Spring 1965 issue of The Baum Bugle, Lee Speth argues that Nikidik faked his death in the earlier book, to assume a new identity as Pipt. However, modern Oz authors usually treat Nikidik and Pipt as separate characters, often as cousins.

He was deprived of his magic abilities by Glinda for doing magic without a permit. Glinda also straightened his crooked limbs.

In The Lost Princess of Oz (1917), Dr. Pipt assists Ojo and Unc Nunkie in a search party that is organized to find Princess Ozma.

Dr. Pipt appears in the 2017 series Dorothy and the Wizard of Oz voiced by J. P. Karliak.

== Ervic ==
Ervic takes the Three Adepts at Magic to Reera the Red.

Ervic is a major character in Glinda of Oz (1920). Displaying "courage, cleverness, and ingenuity," Ervic is often considered one of Baum's strongest male characters (as the author's male characters often tend to be ineffectual).

When Queen Coo-ee-oh launches her submarine attack on the Flatheads, Ervic is one of the young men in her flagship. The Flatheads quickly dispatch with Coo-ee-oh, as they simply wanted revenge on her personally, but as she is the only one who knows the magic to get back to the submerged city, the young men sit in the boat, unsure what to do. Ervic is approached by the Three Adepts at Magic who are stranded in the form of fish. They wish him to catch them in a bucket and to follow their instructions, and that if he does so, he will save himself, his city, and his companions. They help him get the boat to shore and have him carry the bucket to Reera the Red. Reera is a beautiful young woman who practices Yookoohoo (transformation-only) magic for her own amusement. Reera is interested by his impertinence with her, and Ervic very shrewdly manipulates her into restoring the Adepts to human form, taking quite a bit of time and waiting for her to ask permission to transform them several times. The Adepts are able to assist the raising of the city, and with Coo-ee-oh gone, Lady Aurex is named Queen of the Skeezers by Princess Ozma, and for his valor, Aurex names Ervic her Prime Minister.

== Eureka ==
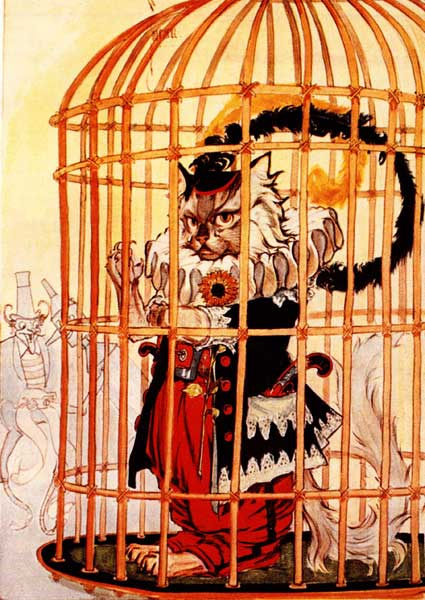
Eureka

Eureka is a white kitten who is introduced in Dorothy and the Wizard in Oz (1908). She is found by Uncle Henry who gives her the name Eureka, which means "I have found it!" Henry then gives the cat to his niece Dorothy making the cat her pet. Dorothy carries Eureka in a small birdcage on a train with her to San Francisco to visit her relatives on Hugson farm. While riding with Bill Hugson's nephew Zeb, an earthquake opens a large chasm in the ground, and Eureka falls with Dorothy, Zeb, and Jim the Cab-Horse into the land of the Mangaboos, people made of vegetable. The strange lights in the Mangaboos' cavern create all sorts of odd colors, and Eureka looks pink there. Eureka is then referred to as a "pink kitten," or sometimes, as in Glinda of Oz (1920), as a "purple kitten."

The last third of Dorothy and the Wizard in Oz presents her as dishonest, and she is placed on trial for having eaten the smallest of the Nine Tiny Piglets, which was given to Princess Ozma as a pet. Eureka is threatened with execution until the piglet is finally found. Although Eureka ultimately tells them where the piglet is, she is amused at being tried for something that is in her nature to attempt. Eureka returns with Dorothy to Kansas, but is later found living in Oz with no explanation of how she returned. Eureka may be conniving and deceitful, but overall she has a good heart.

Eureka plays a significant supporting role in Dick Martin's 1986 novel The Ozmapolitan of Oz, and she is the heroine of Chris Dulabone's The Colorful Kitten of Oz (1990) which, among other things, addresses the inconsistency of Eureka's color. Eureka appears in the 2017 series Dorothy and the Wizard of Oz voiced by Kari Wahlgren. She is a resident of Purrville who becomes friends with the Cowardly Lion.

== Evoldo ==
Evoldo is the late king of the Land of Ev, a monarchy across the Deadly Desert from Oz. He is discussed and pictured in Ozma of Oz (1907), but has died before the adventure takes place. Evoldo was a cruel despot; after purchasing Tik-Tok, the clockwork man, and giving him his name, Evoldo sold his wife and ten children (five boys, five girls) to the Nome King in exchange for a long life. Later, regretting this bargain, he locked Tik-Tok in a stone chamber and committed suicide by jumping into the Nonestic Ocean.

== Foolish Owl ==
The Foolish Owl is a blue owl that lives in Munchkin Country and speaks in nonsense poetry. She and the Wise Donkey serve as public advisors.

She first appears in The Patchwork Girl of Oz (1913) where Patchwork Girl, Ojo, and Glass Cat stop by the office of the Foolish Owl and the Wise Donkey where they knew about their current mission.

== Frogman ==
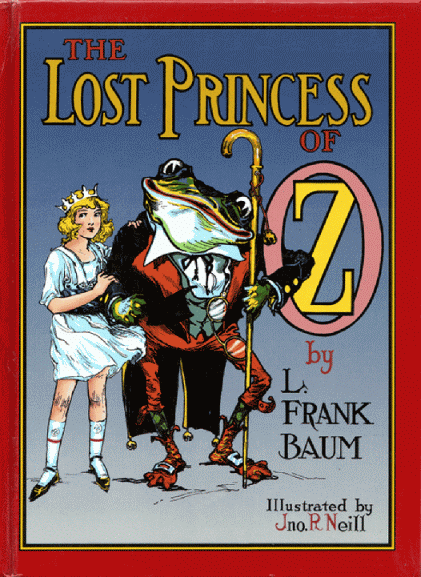
Frogman on the cover of The Lost Princess of Oz

The Frogman is a human-sized frog who appears as a character who is first introduced in The Lost Princess of Oz (1917). He was once an ordinary frog and his similarity to Professor Woggle-Bug is rather clear. Though unlike the Woggle-Bug, Frogman is not thoroughly educated and is much more interested in dandy fashion. He accidentally bathes in the Truth Pond and is thereafter magically compelled to speak only the truth.

In The Magic of Oz (1919), Frogman is among the guests at Princess Ozma's birthday party.

In 1986, March Laumer made him, with the proper name Frederick Fraukx, the title character of The Frogman of Oz: The Oz Book for 1947, along with a U.S. Navy frogman. The Frogman is a crucial character in Jeff Freedman's 1994 novel The Magic Dishpan of Oz.

The Frogman appears in the 1985 film Return to Oz. He is seen in the background at the coronation of Princess Ozma.

== Fyter the Tin Soldier ==
Captain Fyter with the Tin Woodman and Woot on the cover of The Tin Woodman of Oz

Captain Fyter the Tin Soldier is a character who is first introduced in The Tin Woodman of Oz (1918). After the Tin Woodman left his beloved Nimmie Amee after losing his heart (as he felt he could not love her), Fyter, a member of the Munchkin army, met and fell in love with her when he found her crying over her lost love. Unfortunately, she was a ward to the Wicked Witch of the East, who made Fyter's sword do what the Woodman's axe did and cut off his limbs, which Ku-Klip the tin smith replaced with tin limbs (although Fyter is not bothered by his lack of a heart). Nimmie Amee agreed to marry him, but on the day of their wedding, a storm rose up, and the rain rusted Fyter so badly that he was frozen in place along a little used forest path. There he stood for years until he was discovered by the Tin Woodman, the Scarecrow, Woot the Wanderer, and Polychrome the Rainbow's Daughter.

Once lubricated and restored to life, Fyter accompanies the group of adventurers on their quest to find Nimmie Amee, intending to fulfill his vow of marriage (although he is willing to give her up if she chooses the Woodman over him). When they finally find her, she is happily married to Chopfyt, the assembled and combined "meat" parts of the two men. Finding Nimmie Amee happily married, they return to the Emerald City where Captain Fyter joins the Royal Army of Oz. Eventually, Ozma sends Fyter to keep order among the wild inhabitants of the unknown areas of the Gillikin Country.

Oz critic Robert Pattrick, who died in 1960, gave Fyter the first name Abel (as he is an able fighter), which has gained some acceptance in the fan community.

== Gayelette ==
Gayelette was an ancient princess and sorceress who lived in a ruby palace in the northern quadrant called Gillikin Country of the Land of Oz, introduced in The Wonderful Wizard of Oz (1900). She was the original owner and creator of the charmed Golden Cap which had a curse cast upon it that compelled the creatures called Winged monkeys long before the Wicked Witch of the West surfaced.

Gayelette was featured in Roger S. Baum's Dorothy of Oz (1989) where she was the boss of the Jester before he became possessed by the Wicked Witch of the West's ghost.

== Glass Cat ==
Bungle the Glass Cat is a cat made of glass who was brought to life by the "Powder of Life" in The Patchwork Girl of Oz (1913). She is portrayed as vain and aloof, due to the fact that she has clearly visible pink brains and a transparent glass heart.

== Glinda the Good Witch of the South ==
The Good Witch of the South is named Glinda, and appears at the end of The Wonderful Wizard of Oz (1900). She is the sorceress who rules over the southern quadrant called Quadling Country in the Land of Oz. Her overall character is a figure that many of the other Oz characters consult when in trouble or in need of any assistance. Glinda is described as being highly intelligent, wise and independent. Outwardly, she is very beautiful despite the hundreds of years she has lived and is always honest, kind and gentle to everyone who encounters her. She also is one of the most powerful and respected women in Oz and the official protector of Oz's rightful ruler, the child Queen Princess Ozma. She became the official ruler of the southern quadrant called Quadling Country in the Land of Oz, after she vanquished the Wicked Witch of the South (previous ruler).

== Good Witch of the North ==
The Good Witch of the North appears in the beginning of The Wonderful Wizard of Oz (1900). She is the first witch Dorothy Gale encounters upon her unexpected arrival to the Land of Oz. She is the official ruler of Oz's northern quadrant called Gillikin Country but is a very dear friend to the Munchkins. She is described as being very old in appearance and has a jolly and humble personality. She wears a magic white hat that can transform into a magic chalkboard, which she can consult for advice. After Dorothy's farmhouse landed in Munchkin Country and killed the Wicked Witch of the East, the Good Witch of the North gives Dorothy the dead witch's charmed Silver Shoes and kisses her on the forehead for protection while on her journey. She is mentioned in the book The Road to Oz (1909), but does not physically feature again until Ruth Plumly Thompson's The Giant Horse of Oz (1928).

While Baum did not name the character in his novels, she is referred to as Locasta in the 1902 musical. When Thompson brought the character back in The Giant Horse of Oz, she was named Tattypoo.

== Guardian of the Gates ==
The Guardian of the Gates, illustrated by W. W. Denslow

The Guardian of the Gates is a character in several of the Oz books. He is never known by any other name, but he is depicted as a singular character who lives in a small room, based on its description significantly larger than a standard guardhouse, in the wall that surrounds the Emerald City. In The Wonderful Wizard of Oz (1900) and The Marvelous Land of Oz (1904), his job is to adorn green spectacle glasses around the heads of all visitors to the Emerald City before they enter. It is claimed that this is done to protect their eyes from the thousands of glittering green gems within the city that are so precious and rare, they would cause blindness without the spectacles. In fact Oz is "no more green than any other city" and it is yet another "humbug" created by the Wizard. The glasses can only be unlocked by a solid gold key that the Guardian always wears on a thick gold chain around his neck.

After The Marvelous Land of Oz he abandoned the practice, for General Jinjur's Army of Revolt and Tippetarius had all entered the city without damage to their eyes. The Guardian of the Gates appears only occasionally after this book, and his duty becomes significantly lighter.

In The Patchwork Girl of Oz (1913) when Ojo the Lucky reaches the city, he and his companions are taken into the Guardian's room, where the Soldier with the Green Whiskers tells the Guardian of the Gates that he has a note from Ozma that Ojo is to be taken prisoner. So the Guardian of the Gates removes the traditional prison garb, a white robe that completely covers the prisoner, from a closet and places it on Ojo and leaves the Soldier with the Green Whiskers in charge of him.

In John R. Neill's Oz books, the Guardian of the Gates and the Soldier with the Green Whiskers are frequently shown as friends, but the subsequent books of Jack Snow give the duty to Omby Amby (the Soldier's name), and there is no entry for the Guardian of the Gates in Snow's Who's Who in Oz. In Neill's The Scalawagons of Oz (1941), the Guardian mentions a desire to visit his cousin, Oompa, which may explain, in-universe, why Omby Amby is fulfilling that function while the other man was on vacation. Further confusion is created in the MGM movie, in which both roles are played by Frank Morgan, and publicity referred to the Guardian's equivalent as "the Doorman" and the Soldier's equivalent as "the Guard". No other Guardian of the Gates is described in any of Baum's books, aside from a stout woman who takes over the function during Jinjur's rule.

The Guardian of the Gates had his own eponymous song, written in bass clef, in the 1902 The Wizard of Oz musical extravaganza, by Baum and composer Paul Tietjens, but it was cut after only two performances and never made it to Broadway, although the sheet music was published for consumer use.

In the 1939 adaption of The Wizard of Oz, the Guardian of the Gates appears as the "Gatekeeper" portrayed by Frank Morgan (who also portrays Professor Marvelous, the Wizard of Oz, the Emerald City Coachman, and the Guard). When Dorothy, Toto, Scarecrow, Tin Man, and Cowardly Lion reach the Emerald City, they ring on the bell which alerted the Gatekeeper. When he notices that there is no sign near the bell and puts it up before closing the door's window where it says "Bell out of order. Please knock." They knock which pleases the Gatekeeper and were able to persuade him into letting them go to the Wizard by showing the Ruby Slippers that Dorothy has. The Gatekeeper lets them into the Emerald City.

Many film and television adaptations conflate Omby Amby and the Gatekeeper for convenience. An example is the 2013 film Oz the Great and Powerful, in which Bruce Campbell plays an unnamed character who exhibits traits of both men.

In the 2005 TV-movie The Muppets' Wizard of Oz, Sam the Eagle portrays "the Gate Guard."

In the 2015 adaptation The Wiz Live!, Common portrays "The Bouncer / The Gatekeeper of the Entrance to the Emerald City."

== Gugu ==
Gugu is an enormous leopard that rules the Forest of Gugu in Gillikin Country wisely and responsibly. In The Magic of Oz (1919), Gugu was transformed into a fat Gillikin woman when Ruggedo and Kiki Aru in the form of the Li-Mon-Eags trick the inhabitants into thinking that the Emerald City wants to conquer the Forest of Gugu. When Kiki Aru and Ruggedo are defeated, Gugu is restored to normal by the Wizard of Oz.

== The Gump ==
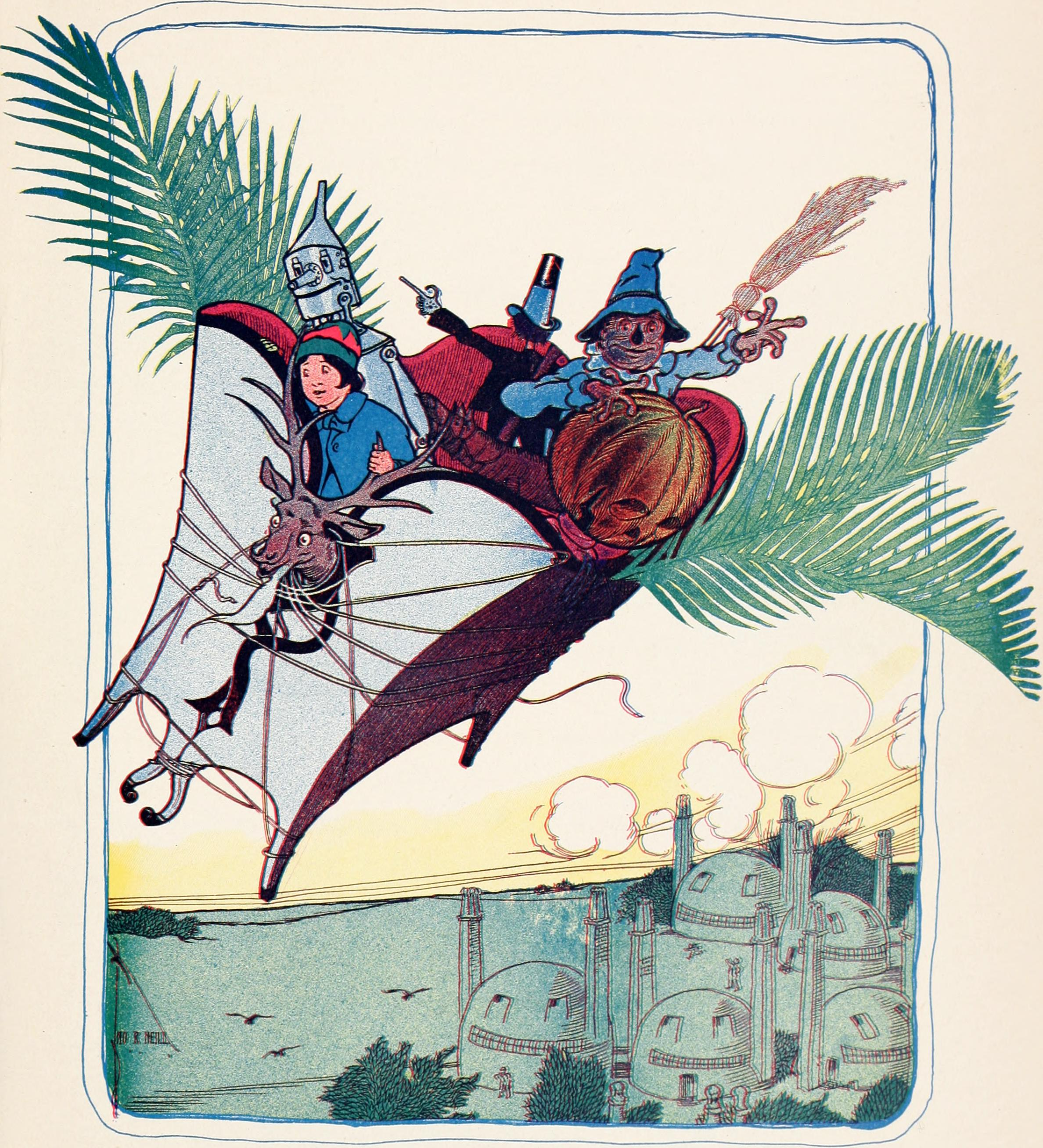
The Gump

The Gump is an amalgam of parts with the mounted head of an elk-like creature, first brought to life with the magic Powder of Life in The Marvelous Land of Oz (1904). Wogglebug combined the head with two sofas for a body, palm trees for wings, and a broom for a tail: all tied together with clothesline and ropes. After crashing into a jackdaw's nest, Wogglebug used a Wishing Pill to fix him. After the Land of Oz is retaken by Princess Ozma, the Gump is disassembled at his request leaving him a talking head that is still living in the Royal Palace of Oz.

The Gump also appeared in Dorothy and the Wizard in Oz (1908) where he meets and talks to Dorothy until Ozma arrives.

The Gump is a central character in Disney's 1985 live action fantasy film Return to Oz, performed and voiced by Lyle Conway and assisted in the performance by Steve Norrington. Depicted somewhat like a green-furred moose, this Gump is assembled by Tik-Tok, Jack Pumpkinhead, and Billina, with Dorothy Gale applying the Powder of Life. This Gump escapes Mombi and survives the Nome King ordeal.

== Hank ==
Hank is a mule that is the pet and companion of Betsy Bobbin, first seen in Tik-Tok of Oz (1914).

== Hungry Tiger ==
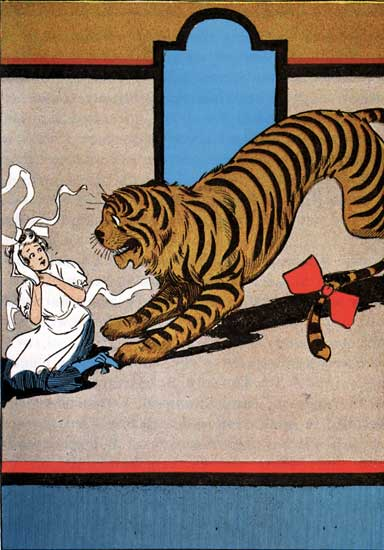
The Hungry Tiger (requesting Nanda's permission to eat her). Illustration by John R. Neill.

The Hungry Tiger is a massive Bengal tiger who is friends with the Cowardly Lion. He is always hungry no matter how much he eats and longs to eat a "fat baby," though he never would because his conscience will not allow him to do so. At the banquet in the Emerald City at the end of Ozma of Oz (1907), he acknowledges that he is finally full.

The Hungry Tiger was introduced in Ozma of Oz as one of Princess Ozma's chariot drivers (the other being the Cowardly Lion), though Jack Snow and others believe he may be "the biggest of the tigers" in The Wonderful Wizard of Oz (1900).

In Chapter 18 of The Patchwork Girl of Oz (1913), he is described as "the largest and most powerful of its kind," and having come from the forest where the Cowardly Lion ruled, which could be taken as an indirect statement that he is the same tiger that appeared in The Wonderful Wizard of Oz (1900).

In "The Cowardly Lion and the Hungry Tiger," one of Baum's Little Wizard Stories of Oz (1914), the title characters go on a misadventure in which the Tiger's refusal to eat a fat baby is put to the test.

Ruth Plumly Thompson gave the Tiger his own adventure in The Hungry Tiger of Oz (1926).

The Hungry Tiger appears in Tom & Jerry: Back to Oz, voiced by Andrea Martin. This version is a female, and has a more anthropomorphic appearance than the literary version.

The Hungry Tiger appears in the 2017 series Dorothy and the Wizard of Oz, voiced by Bill Fagerbakke.

== Jack Pumpkinhead ==
Jack Pumpkinhead first appears in the second Oz book The Marvelous Land of Oz (1904). When Mombi animates a stick figure with a pumpkin for a head using the magic potion called "Powder of Life", it comes to life and is named Jack, who then becomes friends with Mombi's slave named Tip. He then becomes Tip's companion for the rest of the book, and appears in several sequel books thereafter, including a titular appearance in Ruth Plumly Thompson's Jack Pumpkinhead of Oz (1929).

== Jellia Jamb ==
Jellia Jamb, aka the "pretty green girl", is the head maid of the Emerald City's royal palace. She first appears in The Wonderful Wizard of Oz (1900) and is first named in The Marvelous Land of Oz (1904). Jellia Jamb is portrayed as a rather sweet and organized girl when on duty, but mischievous and playful when off duty. She is said to be very pretty, with green hair and green eyes. Her name is a pun on "jelly or jam", a phrase from a question that a maid might traditionally ask a young child when preparing bread for a snack.

== Jim the Cab-Horse ==
Jim the Cab-Horse is a character in Dorothy and the Wizard in Oz (1908). Jim is depicted as an emaciated steed. He was originally charged with taking Dorothy home from the train station by pulling a carriage driven by Dorothy's cousin Zeb Hugson. When a giant earthquake occurs, Jim and the occupants of his carriage fall deep into the earth and into the Land of the Mangaboos. As they enter a fairy country, Jim gains the ability to speak.

Throughout most of the book, Jim pulls the buggy that carries Dorothy, Zeb, and the Wizard of Oz. He is occasionally unhitched from his carriage when it is too cumbersome for the carriage to be pulled or when the travellers must rely on Jim's powerful hooves to fight against creatures such as gargoyles. Upon arriving in Oz, he is regarded as an oddity because nobody has ever seen a flesh-and-blood horse; the only horse they have seen is the Saw-horse. He is treated as an honoured guest in the Emerald City and becomes somewhat haughty, bragging that he was a fast racehorse in his youth. However, his pride is hurt after losing a race to the Saw-horse and frequently asks Zeb when they will be able to return to Hugson's Ranch. His wish is granted at the end of the book, when Ozma uses the magic belt to return Zeb and Jim to California.

== Jinjur ==
Jinjur is the petulant head of an all female army of revolt. She and her similarly-discontented female soldiers attempt to overthrow the Emerald City and install Jinjur as the ruler of Oz in The Marvelous Land of Oz (1904), but her regiment is scared away by scampering mice sent by the Mouse Queen. She also appears in several other Oz books. Her name is a pun on the word "ginger", which is "hot", like her temper.

== Kalidah ==
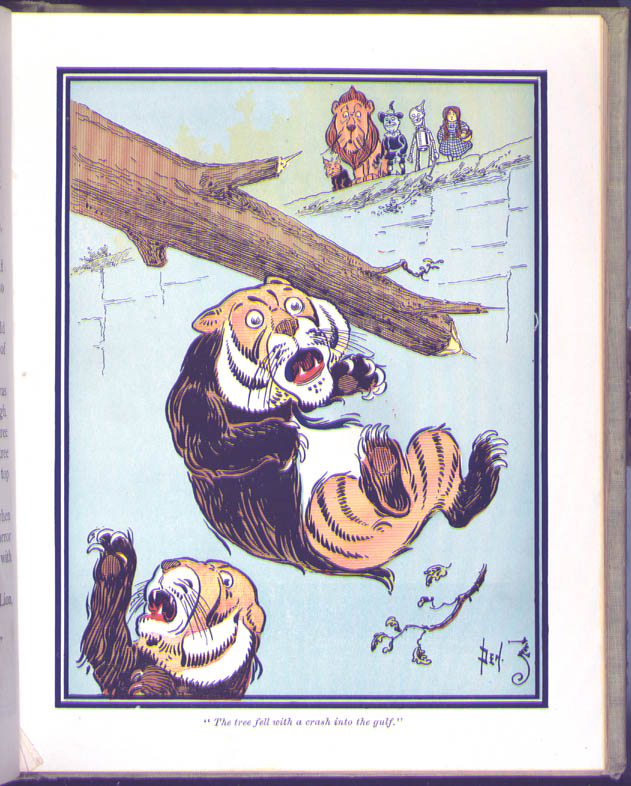
Illustration by W. W. Denslow in L. Frank Baum, The Wonderful Wizard of Oz, 1900

The Kalidahs are a fictitious species of animal in The Wonderful Wizard of Oz (1900). They are mentioned and featured in the first half of the story when Dorothy Gale and her companions are traveling through the dark forest. A Kalidah is characterized as a ferocious monster having the head of a tiger and the body of a bear.

Although two Kalidahs are seemingly killed in The Wonderful Wizard of Oz (after falling into a ravine and being dashed to pieces on the rocks at the bottom), Baum had decided by The Magic of Oz (1919) that the inhabitants of Oz are immortal, so a Kalidah, though pierced through the heart, survives.

Other Kalidahs appear in The Magic of Oz, where they bother Trot and Cap'n Bill. In The Patchwork Girl of Oz (1913), Dr. Pipt keeps Kalidahs struck with his Liquid of Petrefaction by the entrance to his house. The creatures play an important part in Eric Shanower's "Gugu and the Kalidahs." Phyllis Ann Karr's short story "The Guardian Dove," published in the 1990 issue of Oziana, provides a detailed treatment of Kalidah culture.

The 1975 stage musical The Wiz includes a musical number "Kalidah Battle," featuring the Kalidah Queen and two of her gang. In the film adaptation of The Wiz, the Kalidahs are two red paper lantern-alike marionettes controlled by the Subway Peddler, the Wicked Witch of the West's henchman. During the attack in the New York City Subway, it's shown that the Kalidahs are able to separate from their strings, become two meters high and chase anyone the Peddler wants. After the Wicked Witch of West is defeated, when her henchmen (the Peddler included) and her slaves turn into Winkies by tearing their costumes and burning them, the Kalidahs may be destroyed in the process.

No official way to pronounce Kalidah was ever stated by Baum. In Who's Who in Oz, Jack Snow suggests that Kalidah is short for kaleidoscope.

In the 2005 TV-movie The Muppets' Wizard of Oz, the Kalidahs are portrayed by Statler and Waldorf. They heckle the bad jokes of travelers (including the Cowardly Lion played by their old nemesis Fozzie Bear), rather than trying to eat them.

== Kaliko ==
Kaliko is a Nome and lives in the Nome Kingdom, where he is, at least to start off with, the Chief Steward to his sadistic master, the Nome King Roquat the Red. Kaliko is first encountered in Ozma of Oz (1907), though he is identified only as the Chief Steward. In the book, Dorothy's pet hen Billina overheard an argument between Kaliko and Roquat, and learned the secret. She was able to set the prisoners free. In The Emerald City of Oz (1910), Roquat the Red plans to attack the Emerald City in revenge for his humiliation; we see Kaliko only very briefly.

The character of Kaliko is in his prime in Tik-Tok of Oz (1914). Kaliko become king after old Ruggedo (whose name was changed from Roquat) was expelled from his kingdom by the Great Jinjin Tititihoochoo for tipping some members of a Rescue Expedition from Oz down a Hollow Tube and straight into the Land of the Fairies, which is under the governorship of Tititihoochoo. Kaliko promises to become a good king and offers to assist in rescuing the Shaggy Man's brother. Ruggedo returns to the Nome Kingdom, and Kaliko takes him in upon Ruggedo's promise to be good.

Kaliko has a brief role in Rinkitink in Oz (1916), where he helps the cruel King Gos and Queen Cor hide the captive rulers of Pingaree from their "wizard" son Prince Inga and his friend Rinkitink of Gilgad. Kaliko is essentially a good-natured person still, but refuses to surrender the prisoners upon Inga's arrival as he feels himself bound to his promise made to Gos and Cor. However, Dorothy and the Wizard arrive from Oz and force Kaliko to give up the prisoners.

Kaliko makes some more appearances in the later Oz books of Ruth Plumly Thompson, including The Hungry Tiger of Oz (1926), The Gnome King of Oz (1927) and The Wishing Horse of Oz (1935), where he appears to have changed from a "good" Nome into a cruel Nome who harbors plans to rule Oz for himself, and adds himself to the list of Princess Ozma's enemies. He, like all other Nomes, is afraid of eggs; and once he becomes king, he is a self-confessed "powerful sorcerer."

== Kiki Aru ==
Kiki Aru is a Munchkin from the Hyup community on Mount Munch who appears in The Magic of Oz (1919). He is the son of Bini Aru who learned the transformation magic by saying the magic word "Pyrzqxgl."

When Princess Ozma made a decree that limits who can learn magic, Kiki discovered the words and used it to turn into a hawk where he flew to the Land of Ev. After being reprimanded by a sparrow for stealing a coin in the form of a magpie, Kiki was approached by the former Nome King Ruggedo who ropes Kiki into helping him with his plot. Transforming themselves into birds, Kiki and Ruggedo flew to the Land of Oz to avoid being detected by the Great Book of Records. Upon transforming themselves into Li-Mon-Eags (creatures with the head of a lion, the body of a monkey, the wings of an eagle, and the knob-tipped tail of a donkey) who claim to be from Sky Island, Kiki and Ruggedo spread the rumors to the animals of the Forest of Gugu that the humans of Oz plan to harm their forest. This was thwarted by the Wizard who used the magic word to turn Kiki and Ruggedo into different nuts. After being restored to normal, Kiki and Ruggedo were hit with a thirst-inducing magic and drank from the forbidden fountain where they lost their memories and their evil intentions.

== King Krewl ==
King Krewl is an evil dictator who appears in The Scarecrow of Oz (1915). He previously ruled over Jinxland in the Quadling Country before being deposed.

In the 1914 film His Majesty, the Scarecrow of Oz, he was played by Raymond Russell.

In the 1925 film The Wizard of Oz, he was played by Josef Swickard.

== King of Bunnybury ==
The King of Bunnybury is a white rabbit who rules Bunnybury as seen in The Emerald City of Oz (1910). As king, he is very unhappy where he is not being allowed to run wild and free like the other rabbits. He is shown to have an attendant named Blinkem.

== King of the Fairy Beavers ==
The King of the Fairy Beavers appears in Baum's John Dough and the Cherub (1906) and reappears in Jack Snow's The Shaggy Man of Oz (1949). The King of the Fairy Beavers rules an underground kingdom. In both books, he helps the travelers to reach their final destination.

== King Pastoria ==
King Pastoria was the rightful King of Oz until he was removed from power by Mombi. He is the father of Princess Ozma. The character is mentioned in The Marvelous Land of Oz (1904), but does not appear in Baum's books. He is introduced to the series in Ruth Plumly Thompson's 1925 novel, The Lost King of Oz.

== Ku-Klip ==
Ku-Klip is a character who is the originally unnamed tinsmith in The Wonderful Wizard of Oz (1900) who provided Nick Chopper with tin prostheses when the latter was cursed to dismember himself by the Wicked Witch of the East because of his love for the servant Nimmie Amee. In The Tin Woodman of Oz (1918), we are introduced to a soldier named Captain Fyter, who met with the same fate due to his interest in Nimmie Amee, and Ku-Klip did the same for him.

After the witch was destroyed by Dorothy Gale's house, Ku-Klip entered the witch's house and took some of her magical devices, including a magic glue. He had thrown Chopper and Fyter's discarded body parts into a barrel, and decided to use this glue (originally referred to as "Meat Glue" in early editions of the book, but later changed) to assemble the parts from two men into a man called Chopfyt, but he finds he must substitute a tin arm as well. Nimmie Amee marries the assemblage and appears to be quite happy, but Princess Ozma takes the witch's tools away from the smith so that he cannot create any more unnatural beings. Ku-Klip continues to keep Nick Chopper's flesh head, who finds the Tin Woodman's claim to be him ludicrous, in a cabinet.

== Lonesome Duck ==
The Lonesome Duck is a character in The Magic of Oz (1919); he makes brief but gaudy appearances in two of the book's later chapters.

The Lonesome Duck first appears when Cap'n Bill and Trot are trapped on the Magic Isle in the Gillikin Country. He swims "swiftly and gracefully" over to them, astonishing them with his "gorgeously colored plumage". In a brief conversation, the Duck explains why he is lonesome. Though he cannot help free the two protagonists from their entrapment, he makes it slightly easier to bear, by conjuring large magic toadstools for them to sit on. Later, the rescue party searching for Trot and Cap'n Bill almost stumbles over the Lonesome Duck's diamond palace, earning them a stern rebuke from its inhabitant.

== Mombi ==
Mombi is one of the series' major antagonists. The character was originally presented as a lowly hag who had enchanted Princess Ozma in order to prevent her from ascending to the throne. Mombi first appears The Marvelous Land of Oz (1904), when Tip escapes her power. Later in the series, L. Frank Baum specified that she had once conquered and ruled the Gillikin Country as the Wicked Witch of the North only to be deposed by Locasta, the Good Witch of the North.

It is revealed that she helped install the Wizard as ruler of Oz. In Ruth Plumly Thompson's The Lost King of Oz (1925), she is a primary antagonist. In a similar fate to her predecessor, the Wicked Witch of the West, Mombi is melted by water, but in John R. Neill's Lucky Bucky in Oz (1942) she is accidentally resurrected by Jack Pumpkinhead and becomes a secondary antagonist.

== Mr. Yoop ==
Mr. Yoop is a giant from The Patchwork Girl of Oz (1913). He is a 21 ft. giant with a ravenous appetite for meat people and an orange marmalade. Mr. Yoop ate cows and sheep and sometimes knocked over people's houses which led to him being apprehended and imprisoned in a mountain cave making him the largest untamed giant in captivity. Since his imprisonment, he has only eaten six ants and a monkey. He threatens passers-by: "They tell me meat is going up, but if I can manage to catch you, I'm sure it will soon be going down."

The book The Tin Woodman of Oz (1918) revealed that he is the estranged husband of Mrs. Yoop and has been abusive towards her.

== Mrs. Yoop ==
Mrs. Yoop is a wicked giantess and sorceress in The Tin Woodman of Oz (1918). When she meets the Tin Woodman and his companions, she changes them into animal forms. She transforms Polychrome into a canary, the Tin Woodman into a tin owl, the Scarecrow into a stuffed brown bear, and Woot the Wanderer into a green monkey. She is the estranged wife of the imprisoned Mr. Yoop from The Patchwork Girl of Oz (1913), who has been imprisoned for eating people. Unlike him, Mrs. Yoop is not a cannibal; she obtains food by means of her magical powers. The Green Monkey Spell proves irreversible and has to be transferred to somebody else. In this case Mrs. Yoop who becomes, and must now stay, a green monkey. She is a Yookoohoo, a special kind of witch, "an Artist of Transformations" whose enchantments are extremely powerful. The other Yookoohoo in the Oz books is Red Reera in Glinda of Oz (1920). Both Yookoohoos are specialists in magical transformations and are solitary, anti-social, and fiercely independent. The Tin Woodman of Oz is a rarity in Baum's Oz canon, in that the author's manuscript of the book exists, and reveals the changes that Baum made for the printed version. Baum revised his original to make Mrs. Yoop more sinister; and he originally called Mrs. Yoop a "Whisp" (an otherwise unknown term in the universe of Oz) rather than a Yookoohoo.

== Nimmie Amee ==
Nimmie Amee is the Munchkin maiden whom the Tin Woodman once loved in The Wonderful Wizard of Oz (1900). She was not named until The Tin Woodman of Oz (1918), as Nick Chopper never went to find her after the Wizard gave him a "kind" but not a "loving" heart, until that novel's protagonist, Woot the Wanderer, encouraged him to do so.

In The Wonderful Wizard of Oz, the Tin Woodman tells Dorothy Gale and the Scarecrow that the lady was a servant for an old woman who did not wish her to marry, and so sought the aid of the Wicked Witch of the East to place a spell on him that caused him to cut himself up with his axe while carrying on his livelihood. In The Tin Woodman of Oz, this was retconned, and in Nick's new telling, she was directly enslaved by the Witch herself.

Nimmie Amee was aware of the spell, which occurred gradually, and was not bothered by his condition and still wished to marry him, but he lost interest when he lost his heart (In Wizard, he lost his heart after his head; in Tin Woodman, he lost his head last and the Witch ran around with it in her arms). Soon a soldier named Captain Fyter also wooed the lady, and the Witch dealt him the same blow, and he sought help from the same tinsmith, Ku-Klip. Fyter's head and parts of Nick and his body were incorporated into Chopfyt, a new person, through the use of magic glue found in the Witch's house. Ku-Klip was unable to find one arm, so he fashioned one out of tin. In this way, Chopfyt reminded her of both the men she loved, and she married him, and Baum presented them as a happy couple at the end of the novel, although Princess Ozma forbade Ku-Klip from ever doing such a thing again.

== Nome King ==
The Nome King (also referred to as Roquat, and later Ruggedo) is the evil and humorously stubborn ruler of an underground kingdom inhabited by the race of gnome minions, creatures who are half human and half rock. His mountain stands between the Land of Oz and the Land of Ev and is separated from both these two countries by the vast Deadly Desert. He appears in Ozma of Oz (1907) and several of the sequel Oz books. His evil plans usually involve kidnapping the rulers of Oz or taking over the universe. Even after he is deposed and defeated in Tik-Tok of Oz (1914), he continues to make trouble for the inhabitants of Oz and all the Ozians in general. After a number of attempts on Oz's peace and happiness in Ruth Plumly Thompson's Kabumpo in Oz (1922), The Gnome King of Oz (1927) and Pirates in Oz (1931), he meets his final canonical fate in Handy Mandy in Oz (1937).

== Ojo the Lucky ==
The Woozy, Ojo, Scraps, and Bungle in 1913 illustration by John R. Neill

Ojo the Lucky is a Munchkin who appears in several Oz books, including The Patchwork Girl of Oz (1913) and Ojo in Oz.

He first appeared in The Patchwork Girl of Oz. Ojo is a Munchkin who lived with his uncle, Unc Nunkie, in the Blue Forest, a remote location in the north of the Munchkin Country. During a trip with his uncle to visit his uncle's friend Dr. Pipt, Ojo learns from Pipt's wife, Dame Margolotte, that he is known to others as "Ojo the Unlucky." Ojo discovers rationalizations for this, including the fact that he was born on Friday the 13th, is left-handed, and has a wart under his arm, and he begins to believe that bad luck follows him wherever he goes. However, the Tin Woodman officially deems him Ojo the Lucky after hearing these reasons because he believes Ojo's bad luck is due to a self-fulfilling prophecy.

Ojo later starred in his own book, Ojo in Oz (1933) by Ruth Plumly Thompson. In this book, Thompson picked up a dropped thread of Baum's about Ojo being possibly related to royalty and made him the Prince of Seebania, whose family was enchanted by an evil sorcerer named Mooj, causing his father, King Ree Alla Bad, to run around Oz as a bandit called Realbad.

Although Ojo is a Munchkin, he seems to be taller than the Munchkins Dorothy met during her first trip to Oz, though this is never stated. It is usually surmised from a passage in which Dr. Pipt refers to Ojo getting "taller," though only the comparative form of the word is used. Neither Ojo nor Unc Nunkie are described as "tall".

In John R. Neill's books, Ojo is attendant to Kabumpo. This is never explained.

Ojo has appeared in numerous modern Oz stories, which focus on his attributes from Patchwork Girl. As Ojo in Oz will not enter the public domain until 1 January 2029, his Seebanian backstory does not figure in these.

== Ozma ==
Princess Ozma is the ruler of Oz since the end of the second book, and she has appeared in every book except the first. Prior to the second book, she had been transformed by the evil Mombi into a young boy named Tip. In many of the books, she is depicted as a fairy princess of fourteen or fifteen years of age, though she was originally portrayed as not a fairy and much younger. She is the title character in Ozma of Oz (1907) and The Lost Princess of Oz (1917), and makes an appearance in almost every book in the Famous Forty.

In Jack Snow's 1958 novel A Murder in Oz, Ozma's Tip persona reclaims his life, causing Ozma to die, and the Wizard has to find a way to have both Tip and Ozma alive and well at the same time.

== Phonograph ==
The Phonograph (also referred to as The Troublesome Phonograph) is a character who appeared in The Patchwork Girl of Oz (1913). It originally belonged to Dr. Pipt, until it was inadvertently brought to life when it was accidentally sprinkled with the Powder of Life. The Phonograph has a large gold-colored horn, and is screwed to a tall, four-legged table, which it uses for movement.

Once alive, it continued to bother the magician by playing loud and offensive "classical" music until it was at last forced from his home. It then tried to endear itself to the young Munchkin boy Ojo and his friends in much the same way (first with classical, then jazz), but was finally scared off by the Shaggy Man, who threatened to "scatter its pieces across the country, as a matter of kindness to the people of Oz." The Phonograph has never been seen since.

The Phonograph's name is Victor Columbia Edison, but was dubbed Vic for short, by the Patchwork Girl.

== Polychrome ==
Polychrome is a luminous and ethereal sky fairy and the youngest daughter of the Rainbow. She first appears in The Road to Oz (1909). Polychrome also appears in Sky Island (1912), Tik-Tok of Oz (1914), The Tin Woodman of Oz (1918) and Ruth Plumly Thompson's Grampa in Oz (1924).

== Princess Langwidere ==
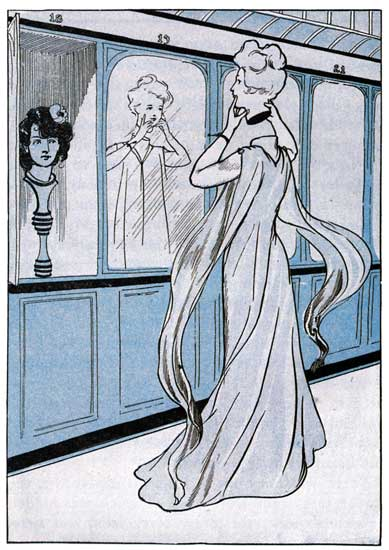
Princess Langwidere. Illustration by John R. Neill.

Princess Langwidere (a pun on the term "languid air", as enabled by her wealthy status and lazy carefree manner) appears in Baum's third Oz book Ozma of Oz (1907) as a secondary villain. She is the vain and spoiled princess whom Dorothy and her company encounter when she visits the Land of Ev which neighbors Oz. Langwidere has a collection of 30 exchangeable heads she keeps in a cabinet constructed of solid gold and studded with gems. The cabinet itself is held within a walk-in closet in the boudoir of Langwidere's palace. Each head is said to be extremely beautiful, consisting of different bone structures that represent different ethnicities and are kept in their own separate cases lined with mirrors that Langwidere keeps locked with a ruby key she wears around her left wrist. Instead of changing her clothing like most princesses, she simply changes her heads to match her current state of mood whenever she pleases. She is portrayed as being a very reclusive and selfish creature, with a terrible temper when she wears Head #17.

Langwidere has a meek-natured dutiful maid named Nanda. Upon spotting Nanda going about her duties around the castle, the Hungry Tiger regards her as exceptionally tasty-looking and eagerly requests her permission to eat her; being denied this privilege, he instead asks Nanda to whip up a sumptuous beef-and-potatoes feast for him, which she shakily agrees to, as her doing so will mean that she will both escape undevoured and temporarily take the edge off the Tiger's voracious appetite.

In the 1985 film Return to Oz, the character Princess Mombi combines elements of Langwidere and Mombi and is an ally of the Nome King. Mombi's heads previously belonged to women living in the Emerald City, animated using Mombi's Powder of Life, with her original head left little used in a cupboard.

In the 2012 film/miniseries Dorothy and the Witches of Oz, Princess Langwidere is a witch and an ally of the Wicked Witch of the West. To obtain a key that would unlock a book containing the Changing Word spell, the Wicked Witch lures an adult Dorothy Gale to New York City under the guise of negotiating the launch of a multimedia franchise based on Dorothy's books about her adventures in Oz to uncover her repressed memories. As part of this scheme, Langwidere uses one of her heads to adopt the alias of Isla Lang, a Hollywood actress pitched to star in a film adaptation. During a battle for the fate of the Earth, Langwidere steals the head of New Yorker Jennifer Mombi after being decapitated.

In the 2017 series Lost in Oz, though she doesn't appear directly, Langwidere is the real name of the Wicked Witch of the East, who in turn is the great great aunt of the original Wicked of the East.

== Queen Ann Soforth ==
Queen Ann Soforth is the ruler of Oogaboo who first appeared in Tik-Tok of Oz (1914). The small fictional kingdom of Oogaboo is separated by a mountain range from the rest of the Winkie Country in the Land of Oz. Oogaboo is the smallest and poorest kingdom in Oz, despite the cultivation of trees which produce many items of value.

== Queen Coo-ee-oh ==
Queen Coo-ee-oh was the Queen of the Skeezers in Glinda of Oz (1920). Shortly after she is introduced, as an arrogant girl of about fifteen or sixteen, who proclaims herself the only Krumbic witch in the world, for she invented the art, the Su Dic of the Flatheads attacks her island kingdom, and she leads the defense aboard a submarine that opens into a boat. There a bucket of enchanted water is dumped upon her, and she becomes a vain, diamond-eyed swan with no memory of her magical abilities. Her sudden transformation leaves her domed city stranded beneath the waters of the lake, as only she knew the spell. The Krumbic witchcraft proves to be a hybrid of dark arts mixed with magic learned from the Three Adepts at Magic who used to rule the Flatheads, while the three magic spells to operating the city are identified as the parts of her name.

== Queen of the Field Mice ==
The Queen of the Field Mice is a gray mouse who rules the field mice of the Land of Oz. She was first seen in The Wonderful Wizard of Oz (1900) being chased by a wildcat until it was slain by the Tin Woodman. After introducing herself to Scarecrow and the Tin Woodman, the Queen of the Field Mice called upon her subjects to help get the Cowardly Lion out of the deadly poppy field. Afterwards, the Queen of the Field Mice informs Dorothy of the Golden Cap that can summon and command the winged monkeys.

In The Marvelous Land of Oz (1904), the Queen of the Field Mice sends some of her subjects to help Scarecrow when he is overthrown from his position as the ruler of the Emerald City.

The Queen of the Field Mice appears in the 2017 series Dorothy and the Wizard of Oz. She is given the name Marie, and speaks with a French accent.

== Quelala ==
Quelala is a handsome man who Gayelette married in The Wonderful Wizard of Oz (1900). He was responsible for creating the Golden Cap that controls the winged monkeys which they used on them after they crashed their wedding day.

Quelala was featured in Roger S. Baum's 1989 novel Dorothy of Oz where he was the boss of the Jester before he became possessed by the Wicked Witch of the West's ghost.

== Quox ==
Quox is a dragon with an electric light attached to his tail who is a descendant of the Original Dragon and first appeared in Tik-Tok of Oz (1914).

When Quox called the Original Dragon senile, Tititi-Hoochoo used him as an instrument against the Nome King where he strapped some seats to Quox and had him carry Betsy Bobbin, Private Jo Files, Hank the Mule, Polychrome, Shaggy Man, Tik-Tok, Queen Ann Soforth, and her army through a Hollow Tube that goes from Tititi-Hoochoo's fairyland to the Nome Kingdom. Using the Enchanted Ribbon around his neck, Quox made the Nome King forget his magic and deposed him by using eggs. After the mission was over, Quox returned to his land through the Hollow Tube.

== Rak ==
The Rak is a flying creature from the pages of Tik-Tok of Oz (1914). The Rak is described as a large winged creature with glowing red eyes that can fly in the air, run like a deer, and swim like a fish. Inside its body is a glowing furnace of fire which allows the creature to breathe out smoke. Its smoky breath blankets the surrounding area like a thick, black fog with an aroma of salt and pepper. It is bigger than a hundred men and feeds on any living thing. Like most other animals in the land of Oz, the Rak can speak. The Rak's vague descriptions given in the storybook lead one to believe that the Rak is a type of dragon.

In Tik-Tok of Oz, the Rak is briefly encountered by Queen Ann Soforth and her army and wounded by gunfire. Although its jaw, wing and leg are broken by the attack, the Rak does not die, as everything in the land of Oz lives an enchanted life and cannot die.

The Rak appears in the 2017 series Dorothy and the Wizard of Oz.

== Sawhorse ==
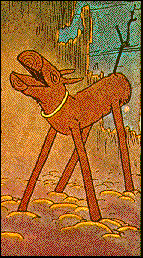
The Sawhorse

The Sawhorse, spelled "saw-horse" in some of the books, is a character from L. Frank Baum's Oz books series. He first appears in The Marvelous Land of Oz (1904). The Sawhorse is a wooden carpenter's sawhorse brought to life with the Powder of Life by Tip to carry Jack Pumpkinhead (whose wooden joints were wearing out from walking). He is a log with a notch cut in one end for a mouth, two knots for eyes and a branch for a tail. When he was first made he had no ears and could not follow directions, so Tip corrected that by carving him some ears from tree bark. He also had a post installed on his back so Jack could hold on while riding. His friends deride him as the least intelligent member of their party, though he usually has intelligent things to say when he speaks.

The sawhorse is one of the fastest creatures in Oz because he never gets tired. He carries Glinda in her pursuit of Mombi into the Deadly Desert while the latter is in the form of a gryphon. Princess Ozma has his legs shod with plates of gold to keep his legs from wearing out.

In The Marvelous Land of Oz, Baum emphasizes the awkwardness with which the sawhorse walks, tottering one way and then the other because his legs do not bend, and front and hind move together. In Ozma of Oz (1907), he is described as walking as well as a real horse. However, he approaches the Giant with the Hammer too quickly and sends his rider Omby Amby up to the giant's arm. This knocks off his ears and leaves him deaf until they can be replaced. He is integral in defeating the Nome King, kicking him with his hind legs in order to protect Dorothy Gale.

== Scarecrow ==
The Scarecrow first appears in The Wonderful Wizard of Oz (1900), when he joins Dorothy to go to the Wizard in search of brains. When the Wizard leaves Oz, he makes the Scarecrow ruler, a position he holds until the middle of the second book. Later, he moves to a corn-shaped house in the Winkie Country. The Scarecrow appears in many of the later books, including The Scarecrow of Oz (1915) and Ruth Plumly Thompson's The Royal Book of Oz (1921), in which he researches his ancestry. He was played by Ray Bolger in the 1939 movie. That actor also played the Scarecrow's Kansan counterpart, Hunk, who was one of Aunt Em and Uncle Henry's three farmworkers.

== Scraps the Patchwork Girl ==
The Patchwork Girl, aka Scraps, appears in several Oz books beginning with The Patchwork Girl of Oz (1913). She is a life-size doll made out of various patches like those on a patchwork quilt. The book revolves around her being created by Margolotte and brought to life by the magic substance called the Powder of Life, that was created by Margolotte's husband Dr. Pipt. She was filled with a mixture of character traits. Originally intended to be an unquestioning humble slave, she comes to life as a rather zany acrobatic person with a tendency to break into spontaneous poetry, all thanks to Ojo the Unlucky messing with the formula for her "brain furniture" and joining the adventure to find an antidote for petrification. In later books, she is often paired with the Scarecrow, being his main love interest.

== Shaggy Man ==
The Shaggy Man is a kind old wanderer who is dressed in rags. He has a chivalrous instinct to protect children from monsters. He first appears in The Road to Oz (1909) as Dorothy's protector, and plays major roles in The Patchwork Girl of Oz (1913) and Tik-Tok of Oz (1914). He is similar to Captain Bill Weedles, another "fatherly protector" character.

Ruth Plumly Thompson and John R. Neill largely ignored the Shaggy Man and Captain Bill, giving the "fatherly protector" role to new characters, including Sir Hokus of Pokes and Captain Salt. Jack Snow restored the Shaggy Man's place and gave him a lead role in The Shaggy Man of Oz in 1949.

== Shaggy Man's brother ==
The Shaggy Man has an unnamed brother who is simply dubbed Shaggy Man's Brother. His name is given in the 1913 play The Tik-Tok Man of Oz as Wiggy. He was a gold miner in Colorado until he ended up in the Nome Kingdom and was taken prisoner by the Nome King who imprisoned him in the Metal Forest. After finding out about his brother's plight 10 years later, Shaggy Man led some of his friends to the Nome Kingdom to rescue him. Afterwards, Princess Ozma allowed him to live in the Land of Oz. He appears to be less adventurous than his brother, as his subsequent appearances are limited to cameos in crowd scenes.

== Smith and Tinker ==
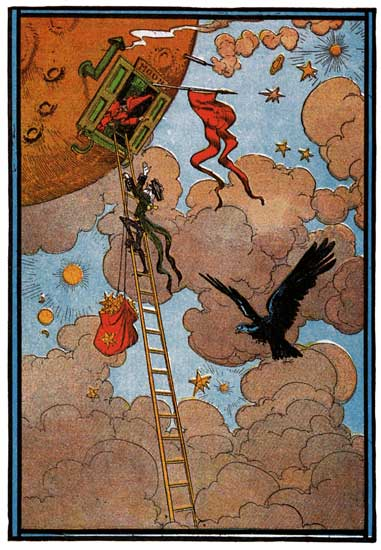
Tinker climbs to the Moon

Smith and Tinker, introduced in Ozma of Oz (1907), are an inventor and an artist who worked out of a shop in the Land of Ev. They created the clockwork man Tik-Tok and sold him to Evoldo. They also created the Giant with the Hammer.

Smith, the artist of the duo, painted a picture of a river that was so real that he fell in and drowned.

Tinker, the inventor of the duo, made a ladder so tall that it reached to the Moon. He climbed the ladder to the Moon and once there pulled it up so no one could follow him.

Smith and Tinker appear in the 2017 series Dorothy and the Wizard of Oz, voiced by JP Karliak and Bill Fagerbakke. These versions are depicted as Munchkin inventors.

== Soldier with the Green Whiskers ==
The Soldier with the Green Whiskers is Oz's one-man army. He appears in The Wonderful Wizard of Oz (1900) and many of the sequel books. He is portrayed as having a very long green beard and carrying an unloaded rifle. He is alternately referred to as Omby Amby or Wantowin Battles.

== Tik-Tok ==
Tik-Tok is a character who appeared in several Oz books, beginning with Ozma of Oz (1907). He is a machine man controlled by clockwork, which needs to be wound regularly. Tik-Tok is often considered the first robot to appear in literature. He also appeared in the film Return to Oz, which starred Fairuza Balk as Dorothy Gale, in which he is a main character.

== Tin Woodman ==
The Tin Woodman first appears in The Wonderful Wizard of Oz (1900), joining Dorothy's quest to see the Wizard in order to get a heart. He had originally been a human by the name of Nick Chopper, but gradually his human parts had been replaced with metal ones. After the Wicked Witch of the West is defeated, he becomes Emperor of the Winkies. He appears in many later Oz books, often alongside his friend the Scarecrow. In the eponymous Tin Woodman of Oz (1918) he searches for his lost love.

== Tititi-Hoochoo ==
Tititi-Hoochoo, the Great Jinjin and Private Citizen, is a Peculiar Person, who rules an unnamed opposite land on the exact opposite side of the earth from the Land of Oz. He appears in Tik-Tok of Oz (1914). Like the other people of that land, all his limbs are of a different color than the others, although he has no heart. The two places are connected by the Forbidden Tube, which was created by Hiergargo the Magician who wanted to save travel time between the two places and whose rash use of the tube destroyed him.

== Tommy Kwikstep ==
Tommy Kwikstep is a Munchkin who first appears in The Tin Woodman of Oz (1918).

When running an errand for a witch in exchange for a wish, Tommy got exhausted and without thinking wished that he had 20 legs where he was transformed into a Munchkin with 20 legs. To accommodate his transformed state, Tommy lived in a log with two entrances for him to go in and out of. As the additional legs did make him faster, Tommy has searched all of the Land of Oz for the witch in question while getting corns on his feet. He was restored to normal by Polychrome who also heals his feet of the corns. Tommy vows not to speak without carefully considering what will be said again.

Tommy Kwikstep appears in the 1985 film Return to Oz. This version is depicted with six legs. He is seen in the background at the coronation of Princess Ozma.

Tommy Kwikstep appears in the 1996 series The Oz Kids episode "Christmas in Oz."

== Toto ==
Toto is Dorothy's pet dog, and he appears in most of the same books as Dorothy, beginning with The Wonderful Wizard of Oz (1900). Due to his appearance in the 1939 film, he has often been ranked near the top of lists of on-screen canine characters.

== Trot ==
Mayre "Trot" Griffiths is a young girl who comes to Oz in The Scarecrow of Oz (1915), along with her friend Cap'n Bill, and becomes a friend and companion of Dorothy, Ozma and Betsy. She is also the protagonist of The Sea Fairies and Sky Island. She appears in the second season of the 2017 series Dorothy and the Wizard of Oz, voiced by Kari Wahlgren.

== Ugu the Shoemaker ==
Ugu the Shoemaker is the villain of The Lost Princess of Oz (1917). He is morally ambiguous rather than pure evil; Baum states that Ugu "did not know he was wicked". He was once a shoemaker in Herku, located in the Winkie Country, until he discovered the magic recipes of his ancestors. Thereupon, he decided to become a powerful sorcerer and take possession of the Land of Oz as its ruler. He moved away from Herku and built a Wicker Castle in the west of the Winkie Country. After stealing the Magic Dishpan from Cayke, he used it to steal Glinda the Good Witch's Magic Book of Records, the Wizard's Black Bag of Magic and, ultimately, he kidnapped Princess Ozma in the process and hid her in the form of an Enchanted Peach Pit. He was finally defeated by Dorothy Gale, who used the Nome King's Magic Belt to transform him into a dove. Realizing how much damage he had done, he only asked to remain a peaceful dove and apologized to Dorothy.

== Unc Nunkie ==
Unc Nunkie first appeared in The Patchwork Girl of Oz (1913). Unc Nunkie is an elderly Munchkin who lived with his nephew Ojo the Lucky in the forests in Munchkin Country. Unc Nunkie was known for speaking primarily in one-word, monosyllabic sentences, though he very occasionally made a "long" speech using two words. Locals attributed his laconic nature to concealment of royal blood.

Unc Nunkie was accidentally turned to stone by Dr. Pipt's Liquid of Petrification, resulting in his nephew Ojo going on a quest to find the ingredients needed for the antidote. Ruth Plumly Thompson explored the "royal blood" thread in Ojo in Oz (1933).

== Wicked Witch of the East ==
The Wicked Witch of the East is a character who is crushed by Dorothy's house in The Wonderful Wizard of Oz (1900). Prior to this, she ruled over the Munchkins and had possession of the magical Silver Shoes (Ruby Slippers in the 1939 musical) that made it possible for her to conquer the Munchkin Country in the undiscovered Land of Oz.

She appears in the book Wicked under the name Nessarose by Gregory Maguire.

== Wicked Witch of the South ==
The Wicked Witch of the South is a wicked witch that ruled over Quadling Country. She was mentioned in Dorothy and the Wizard in Oz (1908) to have been overthrown by Glinda.

Rachel Cosgrove Payes' novel The Wicked Witch of Oz (1993) features a variation of the character named Singra.

== Wicked Witch of the West ==
The Wicked Witch of the West originated as the primary villain and main antagonist of L. Frank Baum's The Wonderful Wizard of Oz (1900), in which she is given no name. She is described as only having one eye, and there is no mention of her having green skin. She rules the western quadrant called Winkie Country in the Land of Oz and enslaved many of the natives. She also owns a pack of killer wolves, black crows and stinging bees. When Dorothy Gale and company are sent by the Wizard to defeat her, she sends her collection of deadly pets to kill them but is unsuccessful. She then uses the Golden Cap to call upon the Winged Monkeys who destroy the Scarecrow and Tin Woodman, but capture Dorothy and the Cowardly Lion. She imprisons them in her castle before Dorothy melts her with a bucket of water when the Wicked Witch tried to steal one of her Silver Shoes. After her death in The Wonderful Wizard of Oz, the Wicked Witch of the West is rarely referred to again in the later Oz books.

She is known as Evillene in the 1975 Broadway musical The Wiz, originated by Mabel King, and reprised in the 1978 film adaptation of the same name. Of all stage, film and animated productions of the Oz story, The Wiz follows Baum's book the most closely, and therefore she has no green skin.

Under the name Elphaba, she is the protagonist of the 1995 Gregory Maguire novel and the 2003 musical Wicked, and is born green due to an elixir given by her father (the Wizard ed of Oz) to her mother (the wife of the governor of Munchkinland) during their adulterous affair. Discovering that she has real powers, the Wizard of Oz orders her arrest when she refuses to aid him in his terroristic control of Oz, and she is declared a wicked witch by the Wizard's press secretary, Madame Morrible. Believing that the governor of Munchkinland is her real father, she is devastated when Glinda gives Dorothy the slippers of her sister Nessarose which had been given her by the governor and which she herself had cast a spell on to enable the disabled Nessarose to walk. Desperate to get these precious family heirlooms back from Dorothy, they confront one another at the castle of Prince Fiyero, Elphaba's love interest, but is doused by the girl with a bucket of water. This kills her in the Maguire novel. In the musical, it is established that water melting her (due to her "unclean soul") was merely propaganda. She uses her feigned death as a way to escape with Fiyero, whom she had turned into the Scarecrow to prevent him from being tortured by the Wizard's soldiers.

== Wise Donkey ==
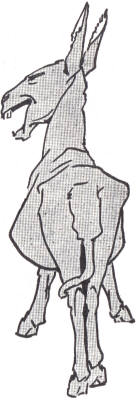
The Wise Donkey

The Wise Donkey is a character from A New Wonderland (The Magical Monarch of Mo) (1899/1903) and The Patchwork Girl of Oz (1913). He began life as an ordinary donkey in Phunniland (Mo, a land even stranger and less logical than Oz), but after consuming numerous books, he learned their contents and became a wise advisor to the King. He sometimes acts in his own interests, at least to the extent of making sure his are met when he aids others, such as suggesting an apple for rescuing Nuphsed, which doesn't work, but when he is fed the apple, he gives an answer that does.

Somehow, he was able to cross the Deadly Desert that surrounds Oz and he took up residence with the Foolish Owl who originally resided in Munchkin Country. The Wise Donkey states that he was visiting on the day Oz was cut off from the rest of the world and was unable to return home. He is seen dusting his house when he is visited by Ojo, Scraps, and Bungle. The Wize Donkey believes that someone as wise as he is should find the Foolish Owl unique and amusing. His logic is regarded by Scraps as so askew that she tells Diksey Horner that he sounds like the Wise Donkey.

== Wizard of Oz ==
The Wizard of Oz is the title character of the first book. In that book, the characters journey to him for assistance with their problems. It is later revealed that he is a "Humbug" circus performer named Oscar Diggs from Omaha, Nebraska; and that he had usurped Ozma's throne with the assistance of Mombi (though this was later proven false). The Wizard later returns to Oz in the fourth book to permanently live there and later learns real magic from Glinda. The wizard is also shown to own The Nine Tiny Piglets which he uses for a trick among other things.

His Kansas counterpart in the 1939 musical film is the travelling magician/fortune teller Professor Marvel; however, the character does not appear in the books as Oz is explicitly a real place, rather than implied to have been a dream.

== Woggle-Bug ==
According to The Marvelous Land of Oz (1904), the Woggle-Bug was once a regular tiny woggle-bug, about the size of a pea. He lived the life of a normal insect until he crawled into a country schoolhouse (presumably somewhere in the Winkie Country of the Land of Oz) and listened to the lessons and lectures the famous Professor Nowitall gave his pupils for about three years. One day, the teacher found and caught him, and decided to use him for an impromptu lesson on woggle-bugs. Nowitall put the bug under a microscope and projected his highly magnified image onto a screen with advanced technology. The bug was proud of his new size; he bowed to the students, and one unnamed little girl standing on the windowsill was startled and fell backward out of the window. While everyone rushed outside to see if she was all right, the Woggle-bug secretly jumped off the screen and ran away. He has remained magnified ever since.

He goes by the name H. M. Woggle-Bug, T.E. (Highly Magnified and Thoroughly Educated). In later books, the hyphen was sometimes dropped: "Wogglebug".

In illustrations, he is often depicted wearing bright colors and several pairs of glasses on his elongated proboscis.

== Woozy ==
The Woozy is a four-legged fictional creature from the pages of The Patchwork Girl of Oz (1913). It is described as being dark blue in color and made up of all squares, flat surfaces and edges. Its head is an exact cube and its body is in the shape of a box twice as long as it is wide and high. All four of the Woozy's legs are four-sided, as is its stubby tail. The Woozy hears via two openings in the upper corners of its head, has a flat nose and a mouth formed by an opening on the lower edge of its head. When the Woozy gets angry, it has the ability to flash fire with its eyes. The Woozy lives in the Munchkin country in Oz and survives primarily on a diet of honey bees. The Munchkin farmers who raise the honey bees nearby drive the Woozy into the forest and confine it with a fence. Since the Woozy cannot climb, he cannot escape his prison. The Woozy does mention in the text that he can jump very high, but also mentions that he has a ferocious roar, which turns out to be completely untrue.

The creature is entirely hairless except for three stiff, stubby hairs on the end of its tail. Those three hairs were one of five required ingredients for the antidote to the Liquid of Petrification that Ojo, Scraps the Patchwork Girl, and Bungle set out to retrieve in the story. In return for some scraps of bread and cheese that Ojo feeds him, the Woozy agrees to give his hairs to the party. When it becomes clear that the hairs cannot be removed from his tail, Ojo frees the Woozy and allows the creature to accompany the group.

The Woozy appears in the 2017 series Dorothy and the Wizard of Oz voiced by JP Karliak. In this show, the Woozy is a large furry creature. He only shoots beams from his eyes when he hears whispers which he hates.

== Zeb Hugson ==
Zebediah Hugson is a boy who is a distant cousin of Dorothy Gale, apparently related through Dorothy's Aunt Em. He works for his uncle, Bill Hugson, at Hugson's Ranch in California, where he also lives. Zeb appears in Dorothy and the Wizard in Oz (1908).

Zeb first meets Dorothy at Hugson's Siding, when he picks her up in a carriage pulled by Jim the Cab-horse. On their way to the Hugson's Ranch, an earthquake causes everyone to fall into the earth and into the Land of the Mangaboos. Zeb, Dorothy, Jim, and Dorothy's kitten Eureka are soon joined by Oscar Diggs aka the Wizard of Oz. The travelers undertake a subterranean journey through the Valley of Voe, are briefly imprisoned in the Land of Naught, and encounter a cavern full of Dragonettes. Despite his reservations about being in a strange land, Zeb courageously defends his friends and helps them escape from the Land of Gargoyles by obtaining pairs of gargoyle wings.

After Ozma uses the Magic Belt to bring them to the Land of Oz, Zeb is welcomed as an honoured guest in the Emerald City. During the festivities held to celebrate the arrival of Dorothy and her friends, Zeb participates in a wrestling match with a Munchkin boy, which he loses, and then a boxing match, which Zeb wins. He later serves as one of the nine members of the jury during the trial of Eureka. While the Wizard accepts Ozma's invitation to remain in Oz, Dorothy, Zeb, and their animals decide to return home. Though Zeb remarks that Oz is a nice country, he admits that he and Jim feel out of place in a fairy country and wishes to return to Hugson's Ranch with Jim. Zeb's last evening in Oz is described as being so wonderful, he never forgot it as long as he lived.

In the 1996 series The Oz Kids, he somehow came back to Oz and married Dorothy. The couple had two children named Dot and Neddie Hugson.

== Other characters created by Baum ==
Baum created other characters for the series that are either mentioned in passing, or play minor roles in the series. The following are in this category.

- Arx - A giraffe who lives in the Forest of Gugu.
- Bru - A bear that lives in the Forest of Gugu and is one of the councilors of Gugu.
- Chipo - A wild boar who lives in the Forest of Gugu.
- Grunter Swine - A pig professor.
- Hip Hopper - A Hopper who is a champion wrestler.
- Johnny Dooit - Johnny Dooit is a fictional "handyman" appearing in The Road to Oz (1909). He is a little old man with a long beard who is friends with the Shaggy Man. His appearance in the novel is less than one chapter, in which he creates a Sand Boat to allow the Shaggy Man and his friends, Dorothy Gale, Button-Bright, and Polychrome to cross the Deadly Desert into the Land of Oz. Johnny has a tool chest from which he can pull out nearly any equipment he needs. At Ozma's birthday party, he builds an aircraft out of contents of the trunk, puts the trunk inside, and flies away as an entertainment while getting himself to the next place he is needed as he loves to work and keep busy.
- Kangaroo - A mittens-wearing kangaroo that lives near Fuddlecumjig.
- Lavender Bear - A stuffed bear that rules over a land called "Bear Country".
- Little Pink Bear - A small mechanical bear who is also from Bear Country, and answers any question correctly that has to do with something that happened.
- Loo - A unicorn that lives in the Forest of Gugu and is one of the councilors of Gugu.
- Mr. Joker - A clown-like inhabitant of China Country made of porcelain china that tries to stand on his head and has cracks on his body due to those attempts.
- Rango - A gray ape who lives in the Forest of Gugu and is one of the councilors of Gugu.
- Stork - A female stork who rescued Scarecrow from the river.
- Tirrip - A great kangaroo who lives in the Forest of Gugu.
- Tollydiggle - A woman who serves as the jailer of the Emerald City prison. Her only known inmate was Ojo.
- Wildcat - A wildcat that chases after the Queen of the Field Mice near the Field of Poppies. It was beheaded by Tin Woodman.
- Woot the Wanderer - A vagabond child from the far corners of Gillikin Country who left his home to see strange things and told his story to Tin Woodman.
- Zebra and Crab - A Zebra and a Crab reside in Quadling Country and first appear in The Emerald City of Oz (1910). The Zebra and the Crab took part in a long-standing disagreement over whether the Earth has more land or more water. They asked Dorothy Gale and the Wizard of Oz to help settle the argument. They agree with the Crab with his claim and the Zebra was shamed that he was wrong.

== See also ==
- List of Oz characters (post-Baum)

== Sources ==
- Baum, L. Frank (1909), The Road to Oz, Reilly & Lee.
- Baum, L. Frank (1918), The Tin Woodman of Oz, Reilly and Britton.
- Freedman, Jeff (1994), The Magic Dishpan of Oz, New York: Emerald City Press, ISBN 9780929605364.
- Gardner, Martin (2004), Are Universes Thicker Than Blackberries?, New York: W. W. Norton, ISBN 9780393057423.
- Riley, Michael O. (1997), Oz and Beyond: The Fantasy World of L. Frank Baum, Lawrence, KS: University Press of Kansas, ISBN 0-7006-0832-X.
- Rogers, Katharine M. (2002), L. Frank Baum, Creator of Oz: A Biography, New York: St. Martin's Press, ISBN 9780306812972.
- Shanower, Eric (June 1995), "Gugu and the Kalidahs", Oz-story Magazine (1): 39–57.
- Smalls, Charlie; Brown, William Ferdinand (1979), The Wiz: adapted from The Wonderful Wizard of Oz by L. Frank Baum, Samuel French, Inc., ISBN 0-573-68091-4.
- Snow, Jack (1988) [1954], Who's Who in Oz, New York: Peter Bedrick Books, ISBN 9780872261884; originally published by Reilly & Lee.
