= Dorothy and the Wizard in Oz =

1908 novel by L. Frank Baum

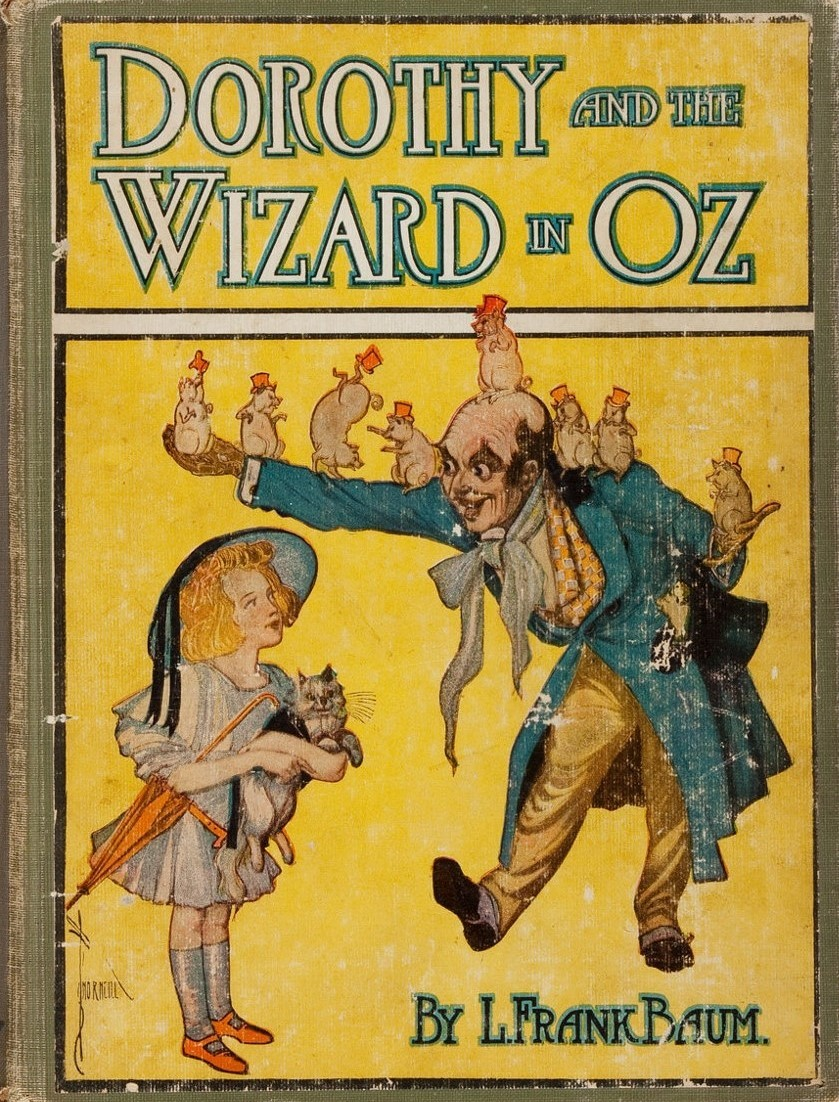
- First edition cover
- Author: L. Frank Baum
- Illustrator: John R. Neill
- Language: English
- Series: The Oz books
- Genre: Children's Literature
- Publisher: Reilly & Britton
- Publication date: 1908
- Publication place: United States
- Media type: Print (hardcover)
- Pages: 257
- Preceded by: Ozma of Oz
- Followed by: The Road to Oz
- Text: Dorothy and the Wizard in Oz at Wikisource

Dorothy and the Wizard in Oz is the fourth book set in the Land of Oz written by L. Frank Baum and illustrated by John R. Neill. It was published on June 18, 1908 and reunites Dorothy Gale with the humbug Wizard from The Wonderful Wizard of Oz (1900). This is one of only two of the original fourteen Oz books to be illustrated with watercolor paintings. (Note: The other is The Emerald City of Oz (1910)) It was followed by The Road to Oz (1909).

Baum, having resigned himself to writing a series of Oz books, set up elements of this book in the prior Ozma of Oz (1907). He was not entirely pleased with this, as the introduction to Dorothy and the Wizard in Oz opens with the protest that he knows many tales of many lands, and hoped that children would permit him to tell them those tales.

Written shortly after the 1906 San Francisco earthquake and around the time Baum moved to California, the book starts with an earthquake in California. Dorothy and others are swallowed up by cracks in the earth, and fall into a cavern, where they begin their adventures.

Very little of the story—six of the twenty chapters—actually takes place in Oz. As in Ozma of Oz before it, and in some of the books after, Oz is not the land where the adventures take place, but the land the characters are seeking as a refuge from adventure.

== Plot summary ==
Dorothy Gale is gladly joining her Uncle Henry in California to visit relatives who live at Hugson's Ranch, after their vacation from Australia in Ozma of Oz. Dorothy meets Hugson's nephew who is her second cousin, Zeb of Hugson's Ranch. Dorothy, Eureka (her cat) and Zeb are riding a buggy being pulled by a cab-horse named Jim when a violent earthquake strikes. A crevice opens in the ground beneath them and they fall deep into the Earth.

Dorothy, Eureka, Jim, Zeb, and the buggy land in the underground Land of the Mangaboos, a race of vegetable people who grow on vines. The Mangaboos accuse them of causing the earthquake, which has damaged many of their glass buildings. Just as they are about to be sentenced to death by the Mangaboos, a hot air balloon descends, and in the basket is the former Wizard of Oz, whom Dorothy last saw as he floated away into the sky from the Emerald City at the end of the earlier book The Wizard of Oz.

The Wizard demonstrates his (humbug) magic powers in a contest with the Mangaboo Sorcerer, first, by "conjuring" nine tiny, mouse-sized piglets (actually taking them from his pocket by sleight-of-hand), and then, by lighting a fire, which is a phenomenon unknown to the Mangaboos. The Sorcerer threatens the Wizard, who responds by cutting him in two, revealing his vegetable nature. The Mangaboo prince gives the Wizard a temporary job as court wizard, but the death sentence is only postponed until a new, native Mangaboo Sorcerer grows ripe enough to serve. Eureka asks for permission to eat one of the piglets, but the Wizard angrily refuses to allow this. The Mangaboo people eventually drive the travelers out of their country into a dark tunnel, which leads to another kingdom.

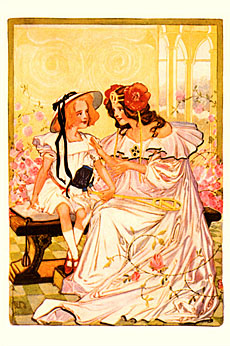
"Dorothy and Ozma", a watercolor plate from the book

They pass through the tunnel into a beautiful green valley. They enter a seemingly empty cottage and are welcomed by invisible people, for they have entered the Valley of Voe, whose inhabitants are able to remain invisible by eating a magic fruit, and use their invisibility to hide from marauding bears. In order to avoid being eaten by the bears, the travelers move on.

The companions climb Pyramid Mountain, and meet the Braided Man, a manufacturer of holes, flutters (guaranteed to make any flag flutter on a windless day), and rustles for silk dresses. After exchanging gifts with him, the travelers continue upwards into the Land of the Gargoyles, where everything is made of wood, including the gargoyles, which are hostile, silent, flying monsters. The travelers are able, at first, to repel their attack successfully because the Gargoyles are frightened by loud noises. However, the travelers are soon out of breath and unable to make more noise, so the Gargoyles capture them. After recuperating from the fight, the travelers manage to escape, and enter another tunnel.

After a close encounter with a family of baby dragons, they find themselves trapped in a cave with no exit. The Wizard, Zeb, and the animals all fear that they will die of thirst, but Dorothy reveals that she has an arrangement with Princess Ozma: each day at four o'clock, Ozma uses her magic picture to see what Dorothy is doing, and if Dorothy gives a certain visual hand-signal, Ozma will use her magic belt to transport Dorothy out of danger to the Emerald City. In this way, the travelers are rescued.

Soon after renewing his acquaintance with the Emerald City staff and making the acquaintance of Ozma and her courtiers, the Wizard elects to remain in Oz permanently, planning to learn real magic from Glinda. He demonstrates his piglet-trick in a magic show, and gives one of the piglets to Ozma as a pet. The others stay for an extended visit, whose highlights include a race between the wooden Saw-Horse and Jim, which the Sawhorse wins. Eureka is accused of eating Ozma's pet piglet. In fact, Eureka is innocent and the piglet is alive and well, but the obstinate Eureka enjoys being the center of the court's attention, and does not try to prove her innocence until the trial is over. After the piglet is returned to Ozma, and Zeb and Jim decide they've had enough of Oz. Ozma then uses the Magic Belt to send Dorothy and Eureka back to Kansas, and Zeb and Jim back to California.

== Publication history ==
Four years passed between the first and second Oz books (1900-4), and three between the second and third (1904-7). By 1907, however, it was clear to Baum and to his publisher, Reilly & Britton, that the Oz books were more popular and sold better than any of Baum's other works. After 1907's Ozma of Oz, Baum devoted more of his energies to Oz. A 1906 contract between Baum and his publisher called for new Oz books at two-year intervals between 1907 and 1911.

In fact, Baum accelerated this schedule, producing Dorothy and the Wizard in Oz only a year after the previous book. The effect of this effort on the quality of the resulting work can only be a matter of speculation; but commentators have noted that this fourth Oz book is darker and more troubling than usual. In it, Baum violates his own standard of leaving out most elements that can disturb or frighten children. "In the first two-thirds of the book, Dorothy and her friends...barely escape from an unrelenting succession of threatening magical countries...." In the company of the Wizard, "Dorothy is a helpless little girl, given no opportunity to show her resourcefulness." When Oz is finally reached, it is a bland "goody-goody place" with few positive events to offer.

== Continuity ==
As events unfold in The Marvelous Land of Oz, we find that when the Wizard of Oz first came to Oz, he had Mombi the Witch hide Ozma, the true heir to the Land of Oz, so that he could rule. In Dorothy and the Wizard in Oz however, not only does the Wizard not know who Ozma is, but he has to be told the entire story as if he wasn't involved and is never questioned about his actions. This change is believed by some to be based on complaints from children as to how they didn't like the mention of the Wizard assisting Mombi, so Baum left this out of later books.

== Notes ==
The Oz books
Previous book: Ozma of Oz	Dorothy and the Wizard in Oz; 1908	Next book: The Road to Oz
