= The Lost Princess of Oz =

Book by L. Frank Baum

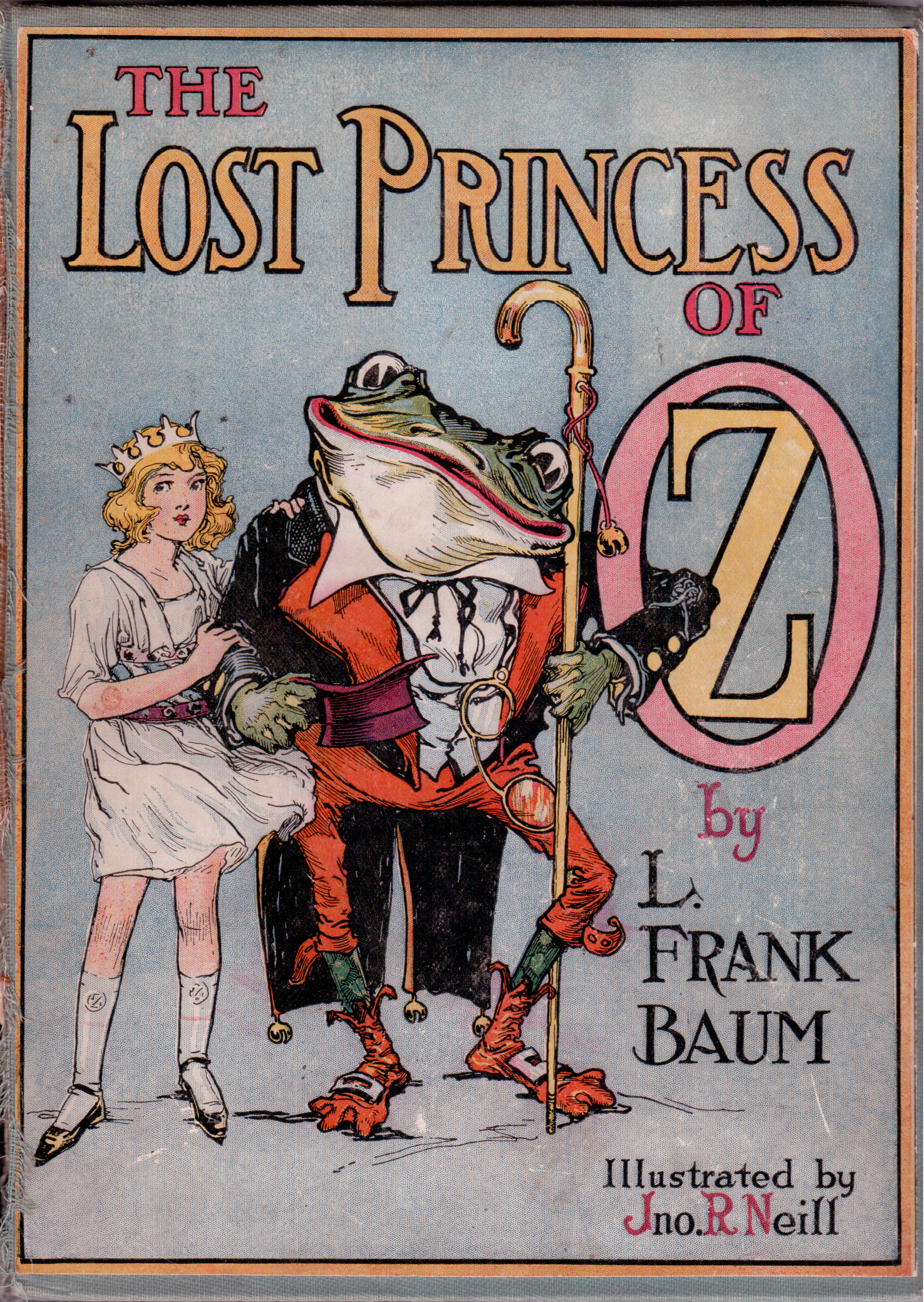
- First edition cover
- Author: L. Frank Baum
- Illustrator: John R. Neill
- Language: English
- Series: The Oz Books
- Genre: Children's novel
- Publisher: Reilly & Britton
- Publication date: 1917
- Publication place: United States
- Media type: Print
- Preceded by: Rinkitink in Oz
- Followed by: The Tin Woodman of Oz

The Lost Princess of Oz is the eleventh book in the Oz series written by L. Frank Baum. Published on June 5, 1917, it begins with the disappearance of Princess Ozma, the ruler of Oz and covers Dorothy and the Wizard's efforts to find her. The introduction to the novel states that its inspiration was a letter a young girl had written to Baum: "I suppose if Ozma ever got hurt or losted [sic], everybody would be sorry." It was followed by The Tin Woodman of Oz (1918).

The Frogman and Cayke's dishpan re-appear in Jeff Freedman's 1994 novel The Magic Dishpan of Oz.

== Plot ==
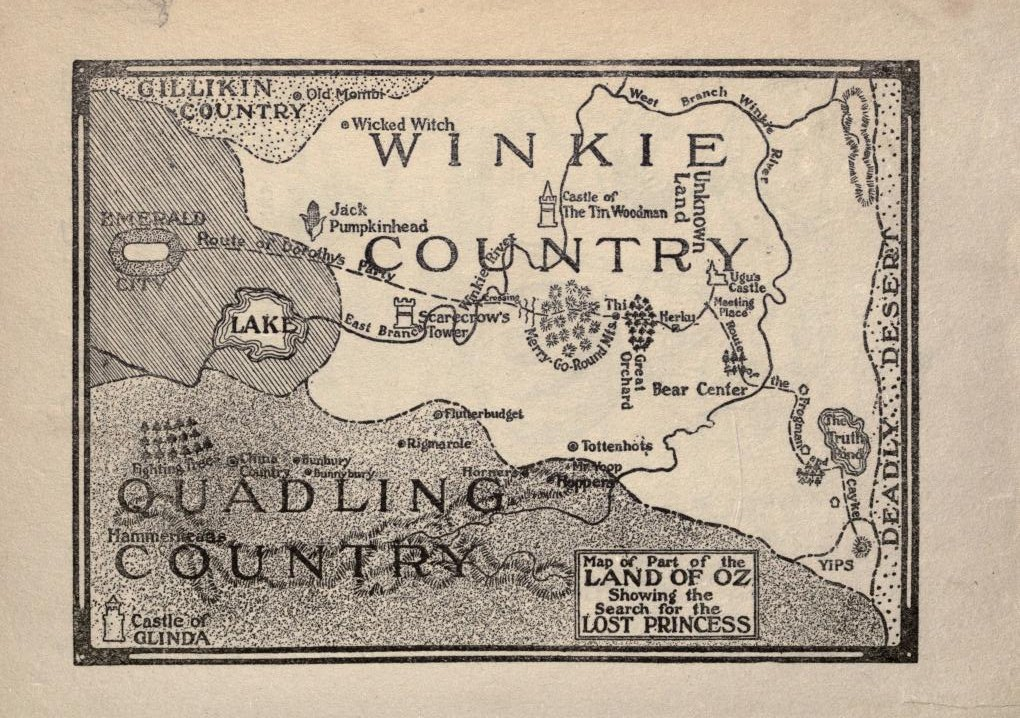
Map showing routes followed by the characters

Dorothy has risen from bed for the day and is seeing to her friends in the Emerald City and notices that Ozma has not awakened yet. Dorothy goes into Ozma's chambers only to find she is not there.

Glinda awakens in her palace in the Quadling Country and finds her Great Book of Records and magic tools are missing. She dispatches a messenger to the Emerald City to relay news of the theft. Receiving the news, the Wizard hastily offers his magic tools to assist Glinda, however, these are missing as well. Glinda, Dorothy, and the Wizard organize search parties to find Ozma and the missing magic. Accompanying them are Button-Bright, Trot, and Betsy Bobbin. Dorothy and the Wizard's party begins to search the Winkie Country to the west of the Emerald City.

Meanwhile, in the southwestern corner of the Winkie Country on a plateau belonging to the Yips, Cayke the cookie cook has had her magic gold dishpan stolen. The self-proclaimed adviser to the Yips, a human-sized dandy of a frog called the Frogman, hears Cayke's story and offers to help her find the dishpan.

Dorothy, the Wizard, and their party enter the previously unknown communities of Thi and Herku. In the Great Orchard between Thi and Herku, Button-Bright eats from the one peach tree in the orchard, and discovers that the peach pit is made of gold.

In the city of Herku, Dorothy and the Wizard's party are greeted by the emaciated but jovial Czarover of Herku, who has invented a pure energy compound called zosozo that can make his people strong enough to keep giants as slaves. The Czarover gives them a clue that Ugu the Shoemaker might be behind all the recent thefts of magic and the ruler of Oz. They proceed from Herku toward the castle and meet with Cayke and her companions.

When the combined party arrives at Ugu's castle, they overcome Ugu's magical defenses and confront the thief. Dorothy uses the magic belt to turn Ugu into a dove, but he modifies the enchantment so he retains human size and aggressive nature. Fighting his way past Dorothy and her companions, Ugu the dove uses Cayke's diamond-studded dishpan to flee to the Quadling Country.

Once the magic tools are recovered, the conquering search party turns their attention to finding Ozma. The Little Pink Bear reveals that Ozma is being carried in Button-Bright's jacket pocket, imprisoned in the golden peach pit. The Wizard opens it with a knife, and Ozma is released. She was kidnapped by Ugu when she came upon him stealing her and the Wizard's magic instruments. The people of the Emerald City and Ozma's friends all celebrate her return.

The Oz books
Previous book: Rinkitink in Oz	The Lost Princess of Oz; 1917	Next book: The Tin Woodman of Oz
