= Glinda of Oz =

1920 book written by L. Frank Baum

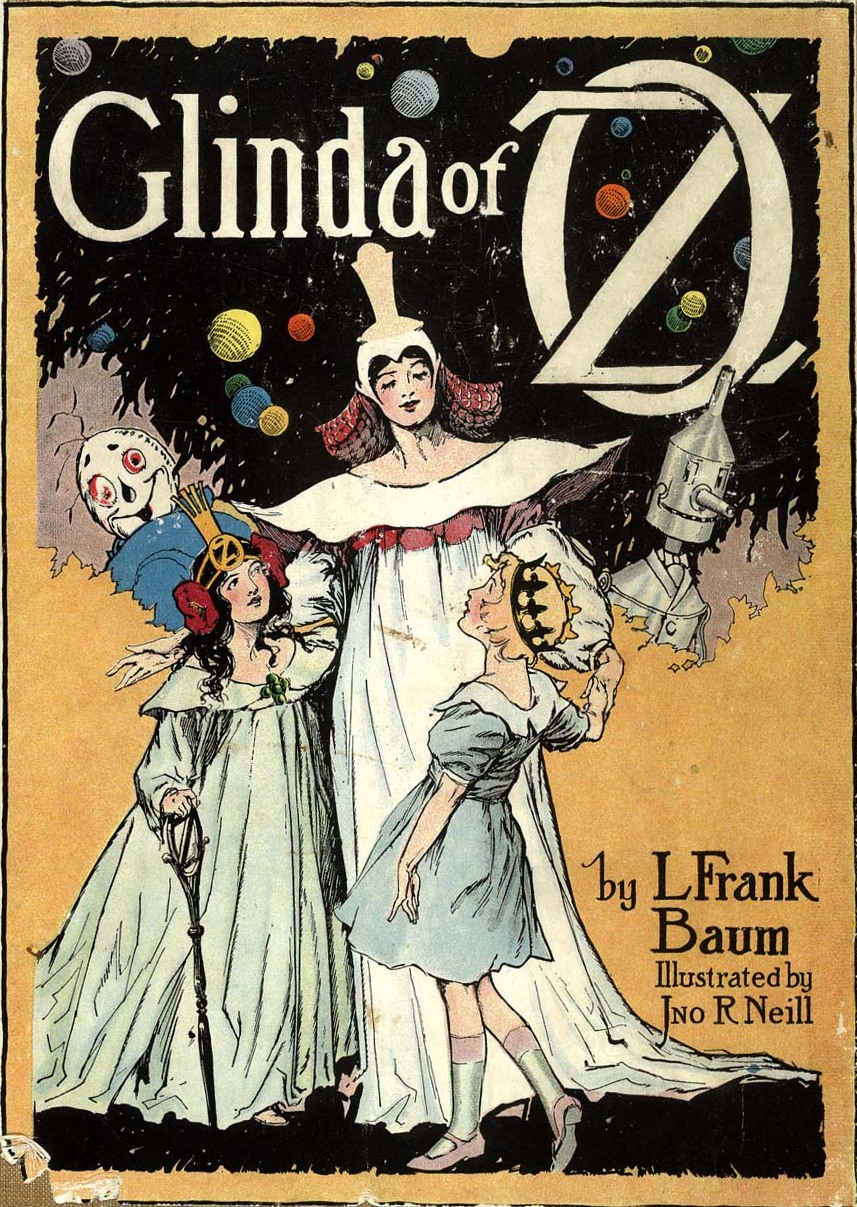
- First edition cover
- Author: L. Frank Baum (posthumously)
- Illustrator: John R. Neill
- Language: English
- Series: Oz books
- Genre: Children's novel
- Publisher: Reilly & Lee
- Publication date: July 10, 1920
- Publication place: United States
- Media type: Print (hardcover)
- Pages: 279 pp (first edition, hardcover)
- Preceded by: The Magic of Oz
- Followed by: The Royal Book of Oz
- Text: Glinda of Oz at Wikisource

Glinda of Oz is the fourteenth book in the Oz series written by children's author L. Frank Baum, published on July 10, 1920. It is the last book of the original Oz series, which, following Baum's death, was continued by other authors.

== Premise ==
Like the majority of the Oz books, the plot is made up of a journey through some of the remoter regions of Oz; though in this case the pattern is doubled. Dorothy and Ozma travel to stop a war between the Flatheads and Skeezers, and then Glinda and a cohort of Dorothy's friends set out to rescue them. The book was dedicated to Baum's second son, Robert Stanton Baum. It was followed by The Royal Book of Oz (1921).

== Plot ==
Princess Ozma and Dorothy travel to an obscure corner of the Land of Oz to prevent a war between two local powers, the Skeezers and the Flatheads. The leaders of the two tribes prove obstinate, and they are determined to fight in spite of Ozma and Dorothy. Unable to prevent the war, Dorothy and Ozma find themselves imprisoned on the Skeezers' glass-covered island, which has been magically submerged to the bottom of its lake.

The situation of the two captives worsens when their captor, the warlike queen Coo-ee-oh, (who alone knows how to raise the island back to the surface of the lake), loses her battle and gets transformed into a swan. The queen forgets all her magic in the process and leaves the inhabitants of the island, with Ozma and Dorothy, trapped at the bottom of the lake. Ozma and Dorothy summon Glinda, who, with help from several magicians and magical assistants, must find a way to raise the island to the surface of the lake again and liberate its inhabitants.

== Writing ==
The printed text of the book features one significant change from Baum's manuscript. Originally, Red Reera first appeared as a skeleton, its bones wired together, with glowing red eyes in the sockets of its skull. The printed text makes Reera the Red first appear as a gray ape in an apron and lace, a comical sight rather than a frightening one. The change was most likely made by Baum at the suggestion of his editors. Other changes in the manuscript, made by an unknown editor at Reilly & Lee, are more trivial. It has been suggested that they do not always improve the text.

The submerged city of the Skeezers in this book may have been suggested to Baum by the semi-submerged Temple of Isis at Philae in Egypt, which the Baums had seen on their trip to Europe and Egypt in the first six months of 1906.

The Oz books
Previous book: The Magic of Oz	Glinda of Oz; 1920	Next book: The Royal Book of Oz
