= John T. Shayne & Company =

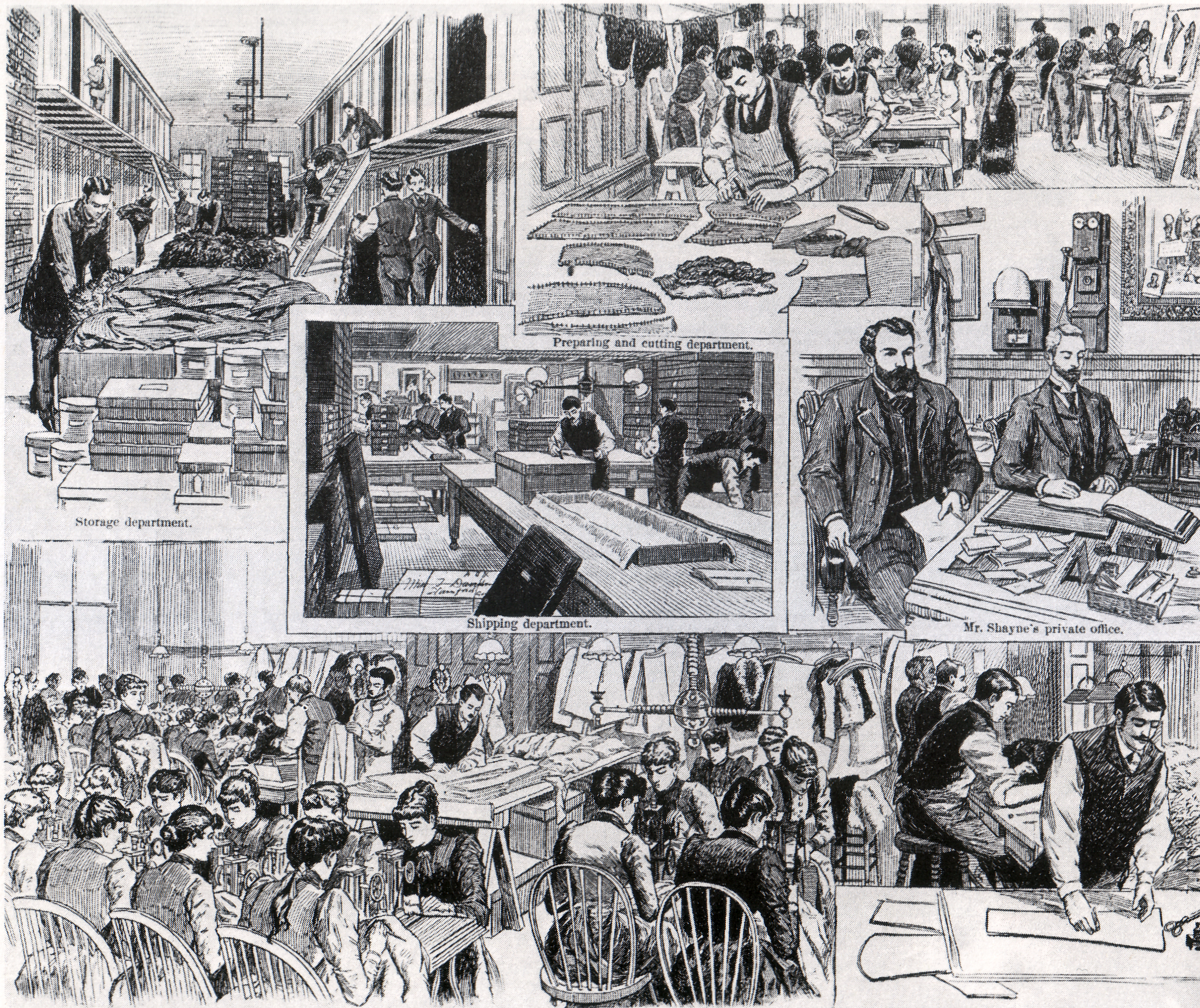
John T. Shayne & Company (1891)

John T. Shayne & Company, a Chicago-based hatter, haberdasher and furrier was founded on November 6, 1884, by John Thomas Shayne (born August 26, 1852) an importer/manufacturer, civic leader and Democratic politician. The firm was formally incorporated on May 23, 1899, and held the distinction of being "the largest business of its kind outside of New York City." The store was first located at 187-189 South State Street in the Chicago Loop (the city of Chicago's central business and shopping district) and later moved to the John Crerar Library building at 150 North Michigan Avenue where it remained until the department store ceased operations in 1979. At the time of its closing, Shayne's was a department store specializing in women's ready-to-wear, couture and furs.

== International recognition ==
The achievements of the Shayne brothers in the manufacture of fine furs helped to bring a newfound respect for American manufactured furs which were primarily reserved only for the elite European manufacturing houses of Russia, France and Germany. At the 1893 World's Columbian Exposition (also known as the Chicago's World Fair), The New York Times reported, "The joint exhibit of C.C Shayne of New-York and John T. Shayne of this city has received awards which, by reason of their number and their language, leave no doubt that the Shayne fur products surpass those made in any part of the world."

== International competition ==
On July 10, 1894, John T. Shayne commented to the Committee of Finance of the United States Senate that U.S. furriers were losing significant income from garments that were manufactured overseas and then brought back to this country duty-free by tourists. Shayne stated to the Committee of Finance, "I could get up a petition that would almost reach from the Senate Chamber to the White House, but do not wish to encroach upon your valuable time."

== America's burgeoning mail order business ==
John T. Shayne & Company was one of the earliest Chicago retailers to join in America's burgeoning mail order business during the turn of the 20th century. Shayne's first mail order publication dates back to 1906 and is featured in the Chicago Public Library Trade Catalog Collection at the Harold Washington Library.

Mail order merchandising played an important role in retail distribution during the 20th century. These catalogues provided rural communities access to an array of merchandise; items ranging from tooth paste to prefabricated houses were marketed to small towns and remote rural communities, transforming the way American's purchased goods.

Chicago area retailers were among the nation's first companies to publish mail orders. The city was ideally suited for America's growing mail order business due to its central location, access to a national rail system and advances made in mail delivery. Chicago became a nationally recognized city through the many images that found their way into these mail order catalogs. These publications shaped the nation's perspective of Chicago and encouraged tourism to the city.

== 1899 shooting ==
On March 21, 1899, The New York Times reported, "John T. Shayne, a wealthy furrier, and a prominent Democratic politician, brother of C.C. Shayne of New York, was shot, and probably fatally wounded, this afternoon by Harry H. Hammond, a tailor. The shooting occurred in the cafe of the Auditorium Annex, where Shayne was sitting at lunch with Mrs. Hammond, the divorced wife of Hammond, and two other ladies." Shayne did miraculously recover from the shooting incident.

== Popular culture ==
Patrick Dennis, author of the bestselling novel "Auntie Mame" referenced John T. Shayne and Company in his subsequent novel Little Me. The main character of the novel, Belle Poitrine, describes her shopping spree "I went on a mad round of shopping -diamonds and pearls- from Peacock's, glossy furs from John T. Shayne, dresses of every description from Field's and Carson, Pirie, Scott with shoes to match from O'Connor and Goldberg."

== Ownership & Management ==
Subsequent ownership included Tom Considine, Jr. who in turn sold the company to Martin Feldman. The Feldman family acquired the business in 1958 whereupon Martin and son Barry Feldman, along with Edwin Smith operated the business until it closed in 1979.
