= Manuel Rosenberg =

American illustrator, cartoonist, journalist (1897–1967)

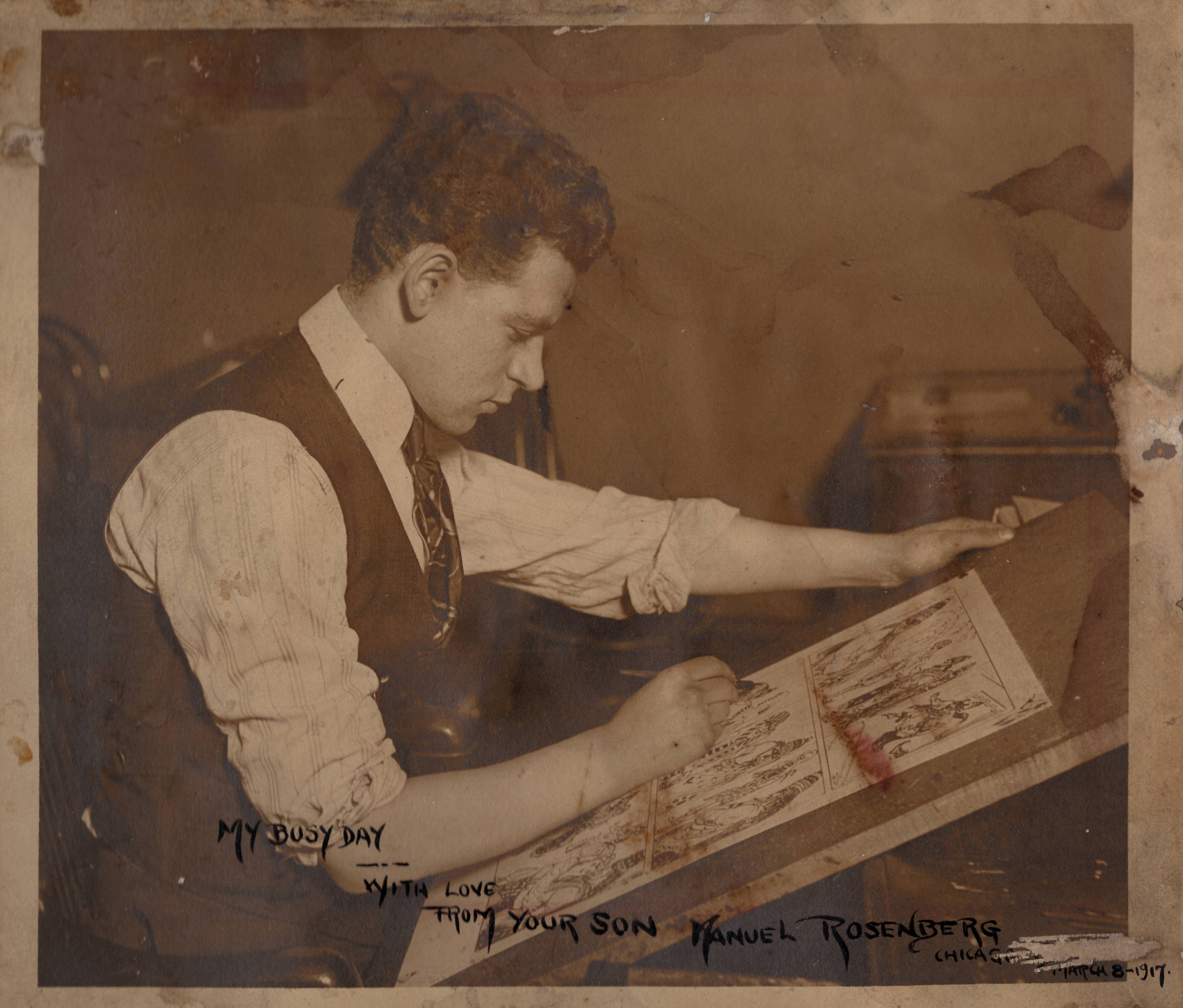
- Rosenberg working on illustrations for newspaper in 1917
- Born: January 29, 1897; New Orleans, Louisiana, U.S.
- Died: April 28, 1967 (aged 70); Manhattan, New York
- Education: Art Academy of Cincinnati

Manuel Rosenberg (January 29, 1897 – April 28, 1967) was an American illustrator, cartoonist, writer, lecturer, teacher, editor, and publisher. From 1917 to 1930, he was the chief artist for the Scripps-Howard chain of newspapers and the art editor of the Cincinnati Post.

== Biography ==
=== Early years ===
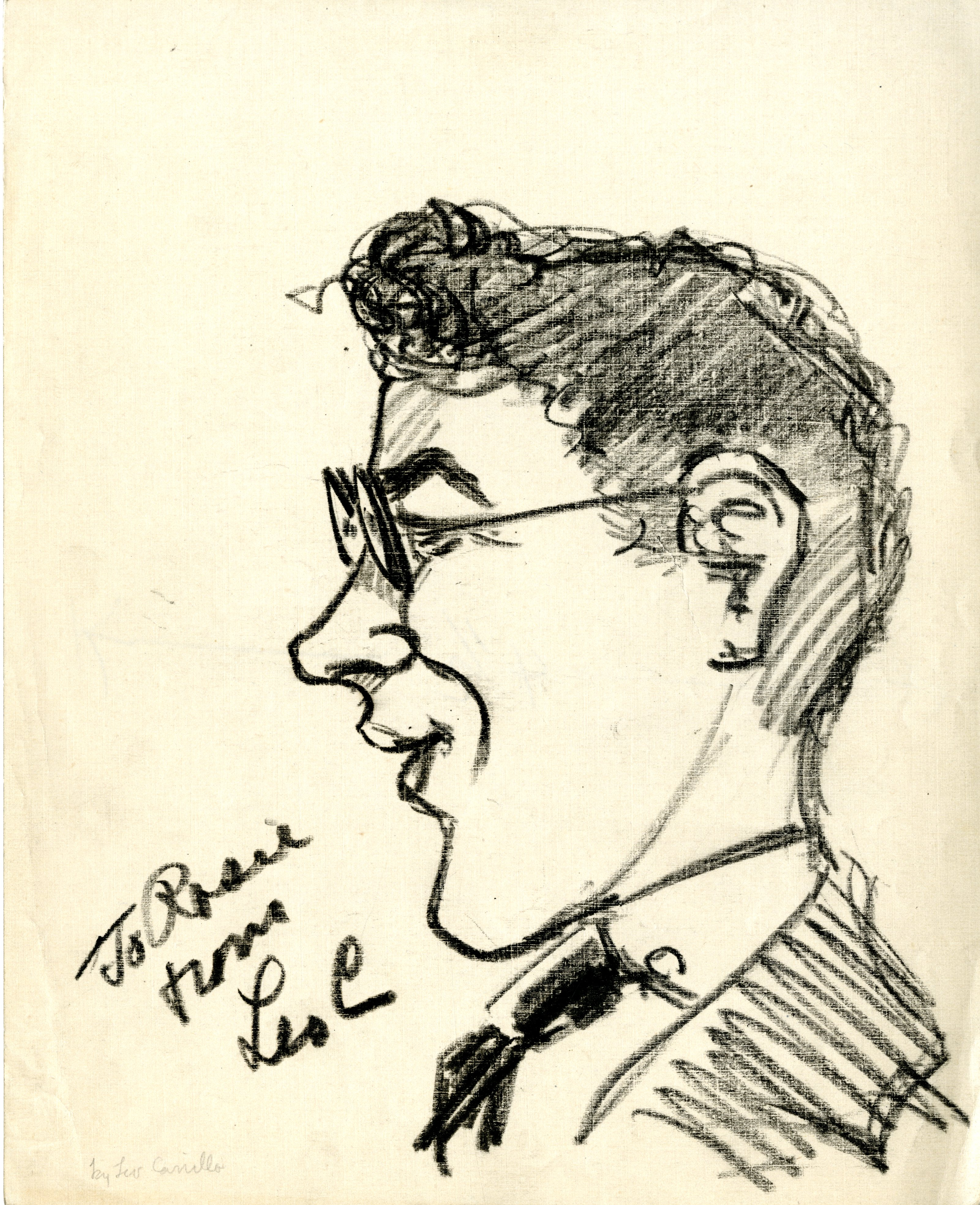
Portrait of Manuel Rosenberg by Leo Carrillo

Manuel (or Emmanuel) Rosenberg was born in New Orleans, Louisiana, on January 29, 1897, to Jewish immigrant parents. His father, Benjamin Rosenberg (1869–1941), was a cap maker born in Minsk and his mother, Celia Jasin Rosenberg (1873–1958), was born in Brest to parents born in Breslau (now Wrocław, Poland).

The family moved to Cincinnati shortly after his birth. The Rosenbergs were a working-class Yiddish-speaking family that lived in the Over-the-Rhine immigrant neighborhood near downtown. Rosenberg's two siblings, Simon (1899–1981) and Jessie Rosenberg Tyroler (1901–1987), were both born in Cincinnati before Benjamin left the family and moved to California. Celia ran Rosenberg's, the family dry goods store, with Simon. Jessie married an optometrist and moved to Columbus. Manuel was the only family member to stay in touch with his father, who remarried in 1911 to Jennie Schafland (or Shefflen) and had a daughter, Adella Rosenberg Strauss (1912–2006).

=== Career ===
The Cincinnati Post recognized Rosenberg as "one of the greatest newspaper sketch artists of his time." His first cartoon was published in New York City when he was 15. In 1915, he was the creator of a page of cartoons that appeared in the London Herald. He sold newspapers to earn money to attend the Cincinnati Art Academy where he studied portraiture with Duveneck and landscapes with Meakin. His talent and artistic ambitions caught the attention of local Cincinnati realty operator Walter S. Coles, who sent him to art school. He attended the National Academy of Design in New York City, the Chicago Academy of Fine Arts, and studied in Paris. By 1918, he was working for well-known newspapers in large eastern and western cities; Cartoons Magazine in New York, Toledo News-Bee, Chicago Day Book, and Chicago Abendpost. During his career, he was known for his enormous output of graphic art.

He enlisted in the navy on June 5, 1918, and became the official cartoonist of the United States aviation training department in Great Lakes, Illinois.

During his thirteen years as the chief artist of the Scripps-Howard newspapers from 1917 to 1930, Rosenberg carried his drawing board to every corner of the world to cover the major news stories. He interviewed and sketched almost every famous personality of his time, including statesmen, soldiers, chorus girls and even criminals—including bootlegger George Remus in his 1927 murder trial. Rosenberg had audiences with most of the kings, popes, and dictators of Europe. He sketched and interviewed Galli-Curci, Lindbergh, Grand Duke Alexander, Lloyd George, Queen Maria of Romania, and Lord Rothschild. He sketched archeologist Howard Carter in 1924 after he discovered King Tut's Tomb. He knew and sketched many U.S. presidents during his career including Calvin Coolidge, Warren G. Harding and Herbert Hoover.

In 1928, Rosenberg was involved in a second career as the founder and publisher of The Advertiser and Markets of America, a well-known monthly publication devoted to the interests in national advertising in the US and Canada.

=== Travels ===
As a journalist and art editor, Rosenberg spent practically all his time "on the road". He chronicled foreign travel assignments to over thirty countries for the Cincinnati Post, starting with his 1922 and 1926 trips to Europe. In 1929, he was among the first American newsmen to travel in and report from the Soviet Union. His series Rosie sketches Russia was highly promoted that summer.

=== Personal life ===
Rosenberg met Lydie Joyce Bloch (August 2, 1908 – November 24, 2002) when she was an assistant at his publication Markets of America. Lydie was a Jewish photographer from Paris who learned the business and became the editor and co-publisher.

Rosenberg died in 1967, aged 70, at Memorial Sloan Kettering Cancer Center, after a long battle with cancer. He was buried in Hawthorne, New York. Lydie remarried in 1970 to their mutual friend James Gordon Strobridge (1894–1985) – heir to the Strobridge Lithographing Company. In 1973, Lydie donated 300 of Manuel Rosenberg's sketches and caricatures of leading personalities in public life and the arts as well as travel drawings made from the 1920s to the 1950s to the Rare Library Archives of Columbia University. Lydie died in 2002 at the age of 94.

== Books ==
Rosenberg was the author of four books on art and art instructions, used for reference in many art schools and libraries throughout the world.

- Course in Newspaper Art (1922)
- Practical Art by Manuel Rosenberg - A Complete Illustrated Manual for Art Students, Cartoonists Commercial Artists Fashion Artists & Illustrators (1924)
- Manuel Rosenberg Course in Cartooning and Drawing (1927)
- The Art of Advertising (1930) co-written by E. Walker Hartley and published by Harper and Brothers

== Gallery ==
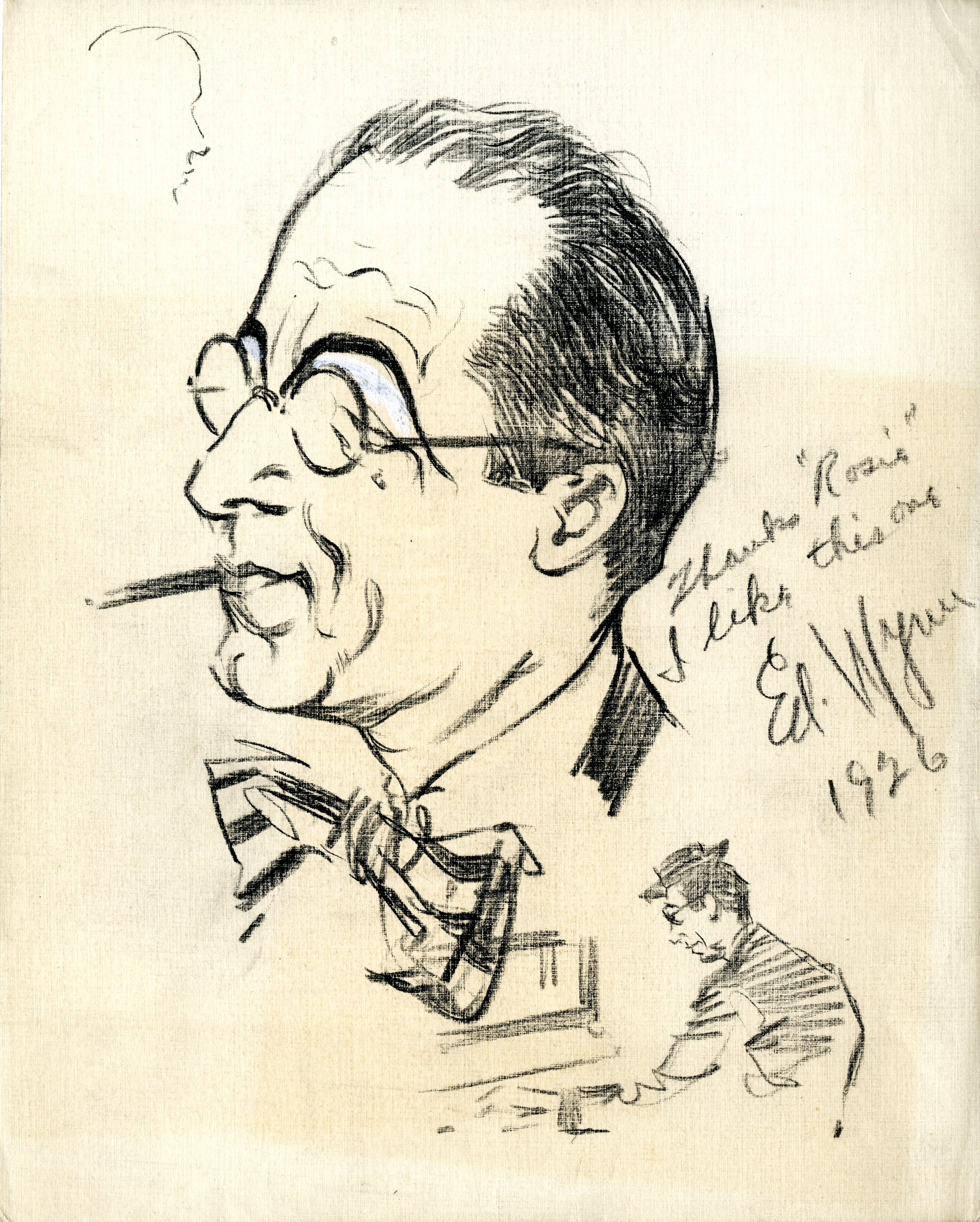
Manuel Rosenberg signed sketch of Ed Wynn

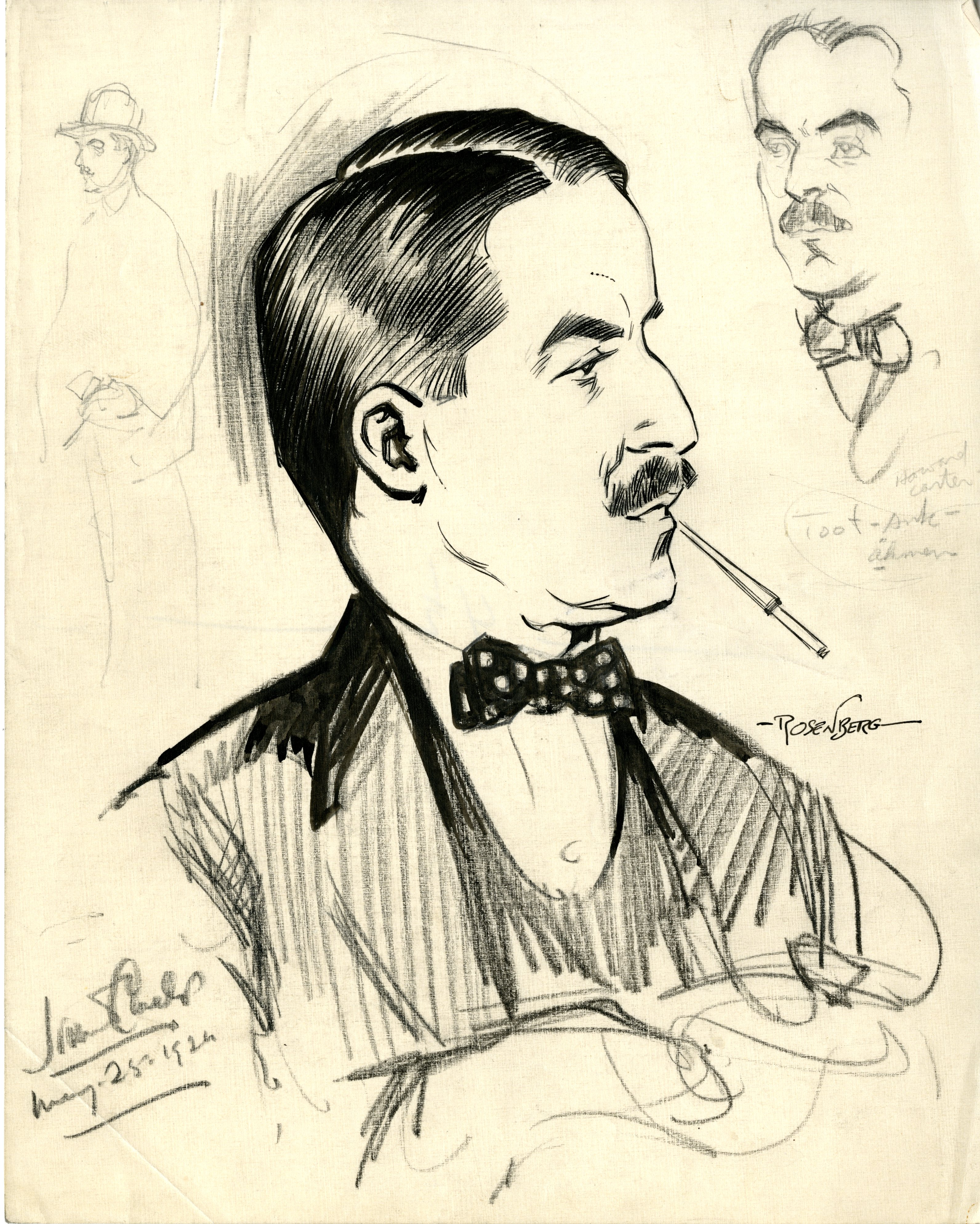
Manuel Rosenberg signed sketch of Howard Carter

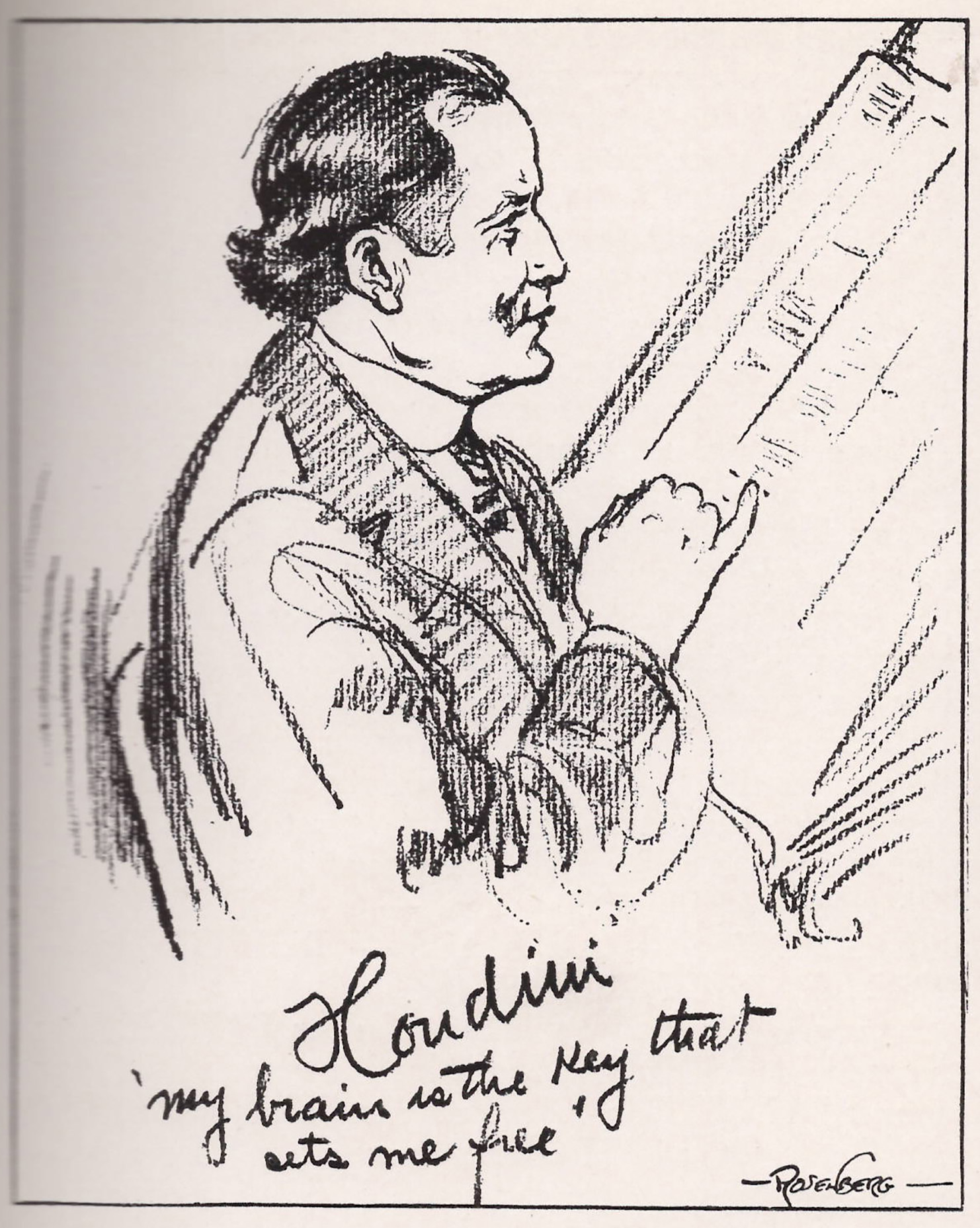
Manuel Rosenberg signed sketch of Harry Houdini

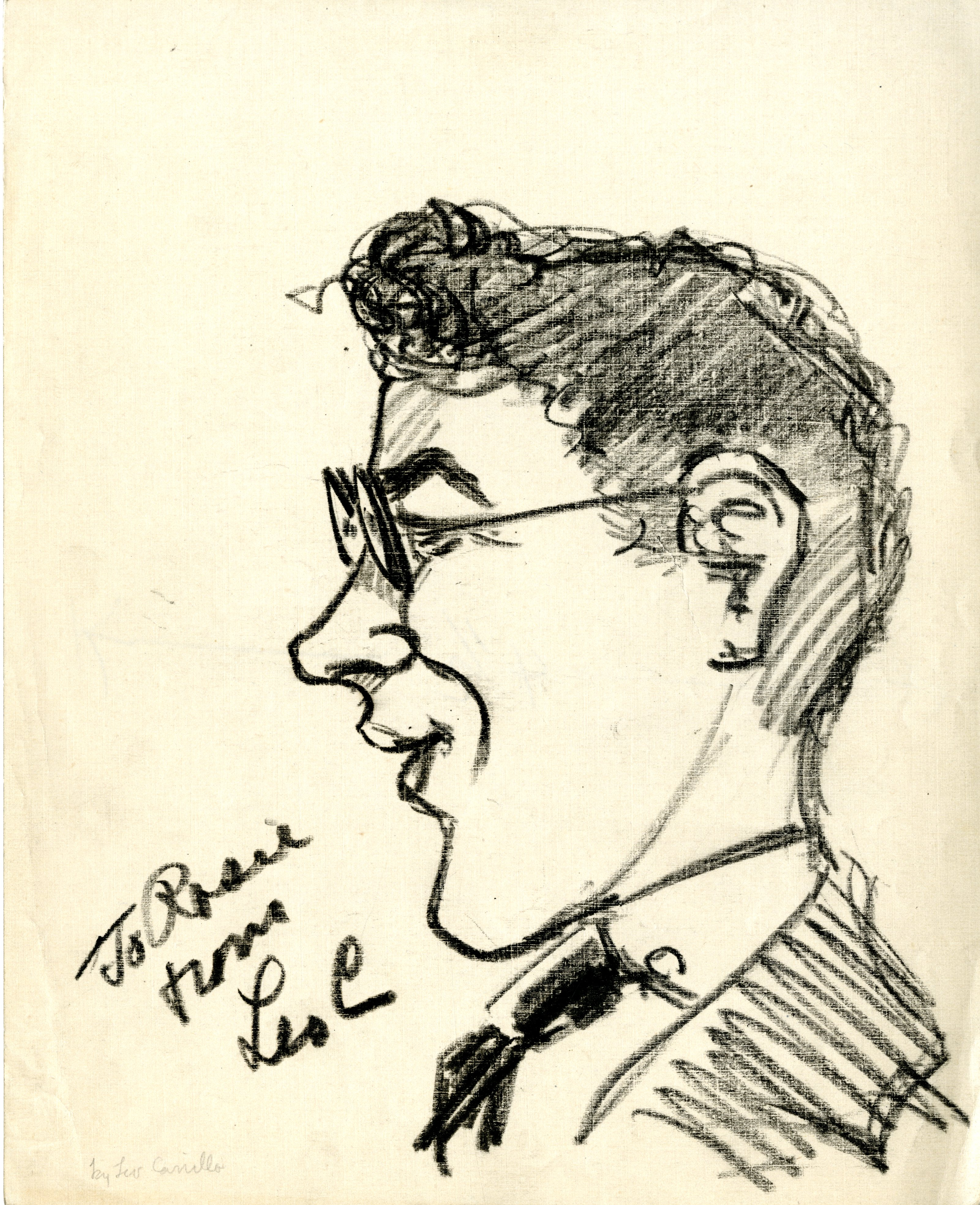
Portrait of Manuel Rosenberg by Leo Carrillo

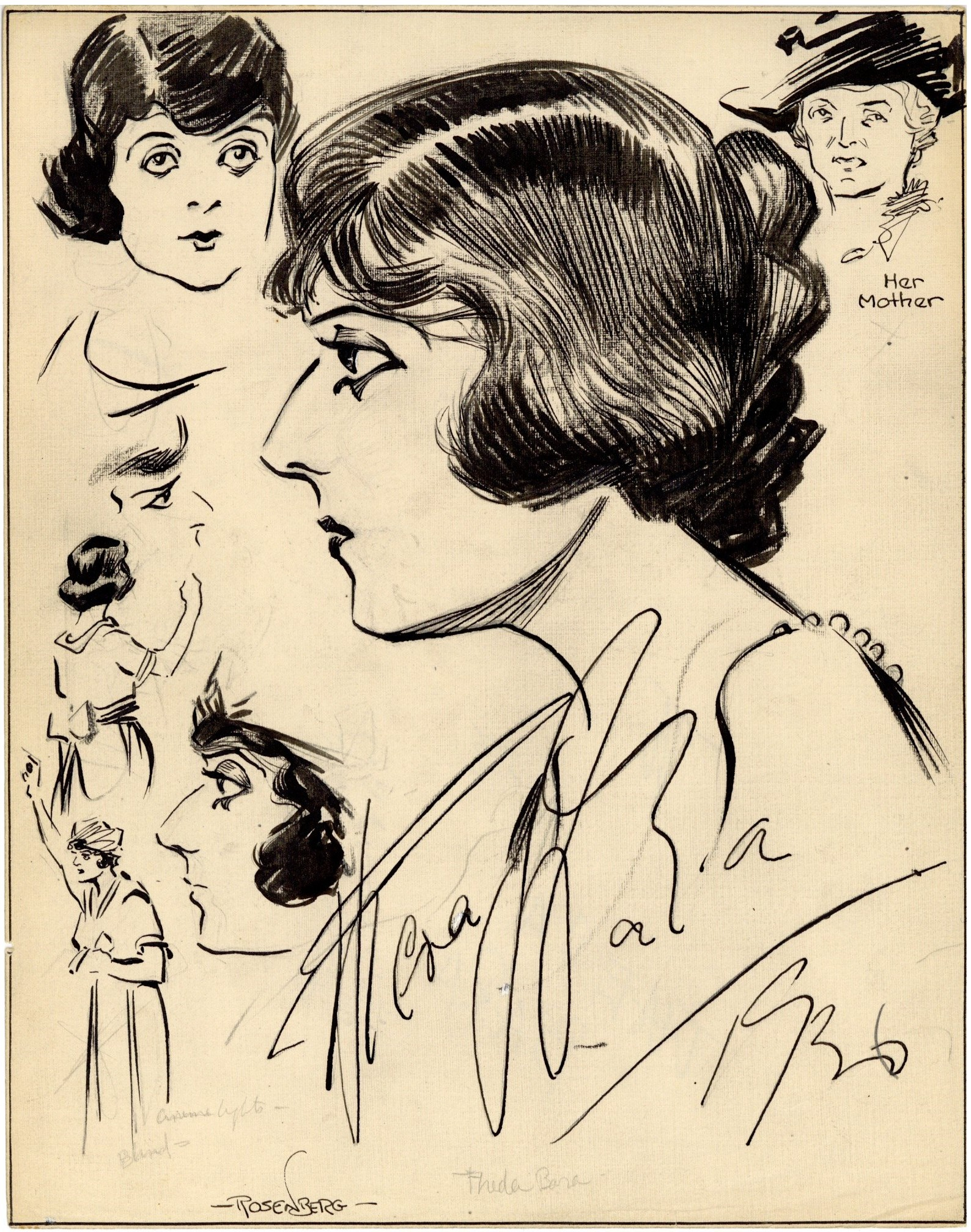
Manuel Rosenberg portrait of Theda Bara

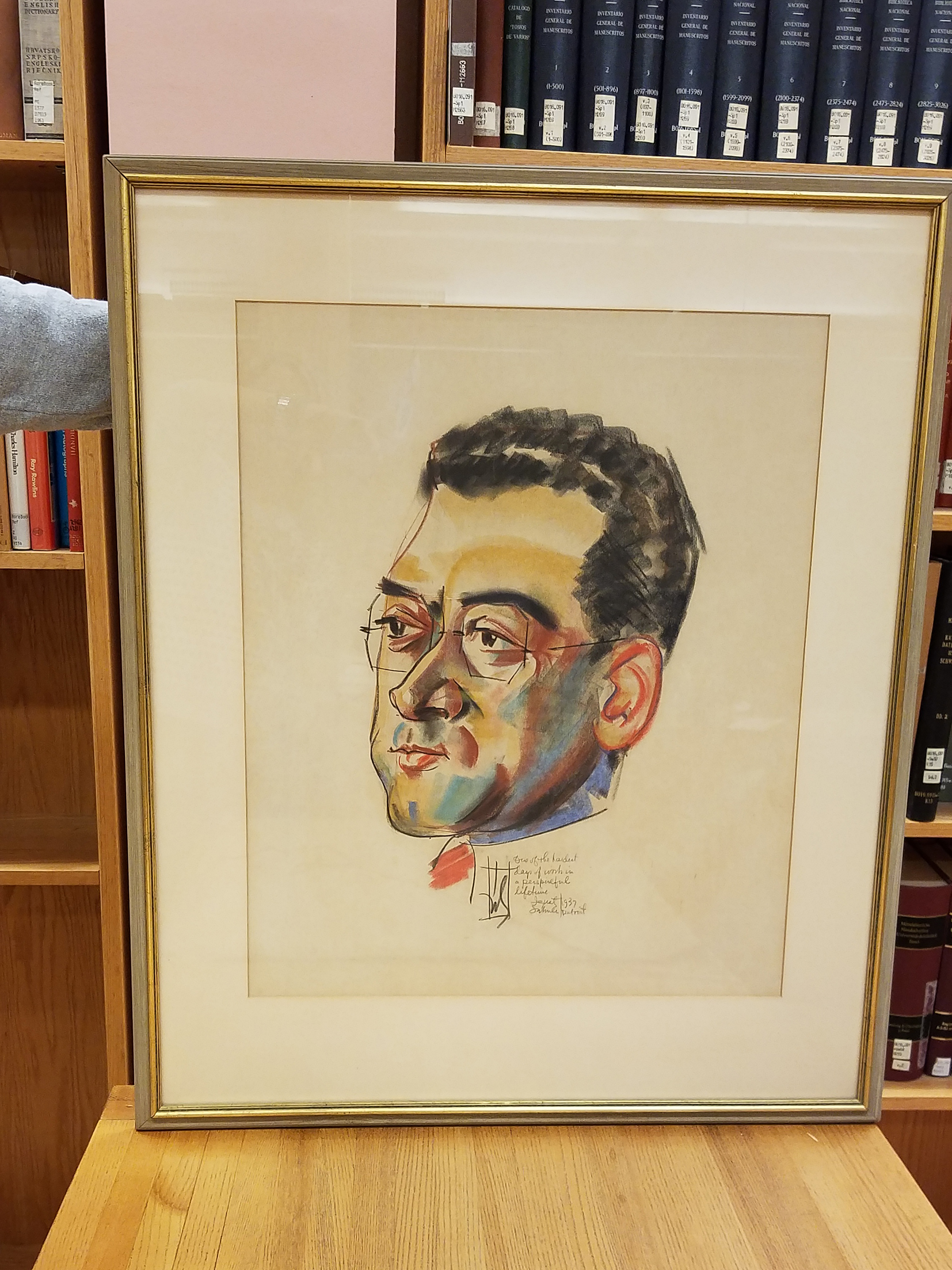
Manuel Rosenberg portrait by Ignatz Sahula-Dycke

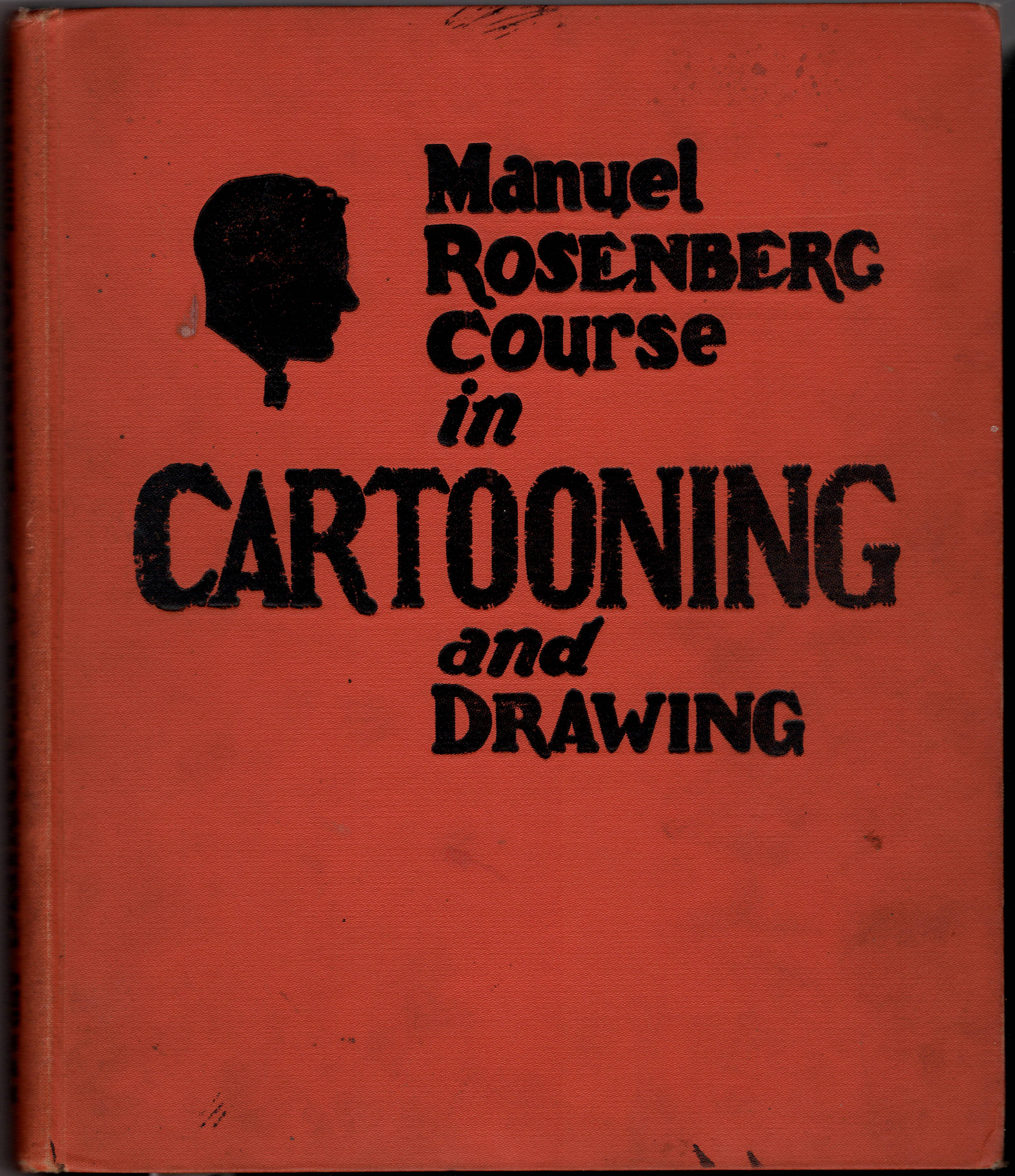
Manuel Rosenberg Course in Cartooning and Drawing
