= Romola Remus =

American actress

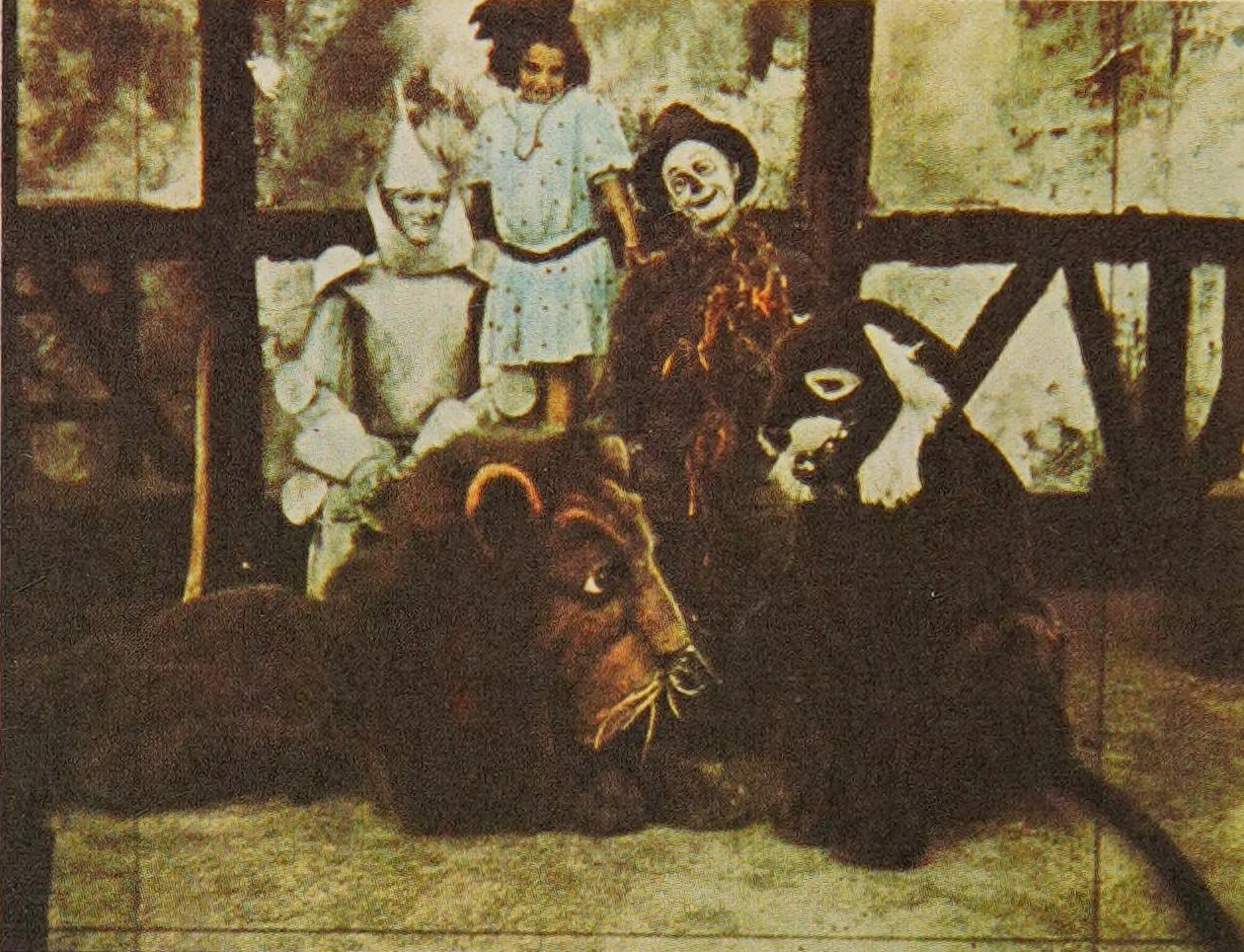
- Romola Remus (rear center) and other cast members in 1908
- Born: April 7, 1900
- Died: February 17, 1987 (aged 86); Chicago, Illinois, U.S.
- Occupations: Stage and film actress

Romola Remus Dunlap (April 7, 1900 – February 17, 1987) was an American actress who was the first to play Dorothy Gale in film, in the 1908 multimedia stage/film production The Fairylogue and Radio-Plays, an adaptation of the Oz books. She worked directly with author L. Frank Baum, the creator of the character.

== Family ==
Remus was the daughter of the highly successful bootlegger George Remus and his first wife Lillian Klauff Remus. Her father, a pharmacist, later became a successful criminal defense lawyer in Chicago and a bootlegger in Cincinnati.

== Silent film career ==
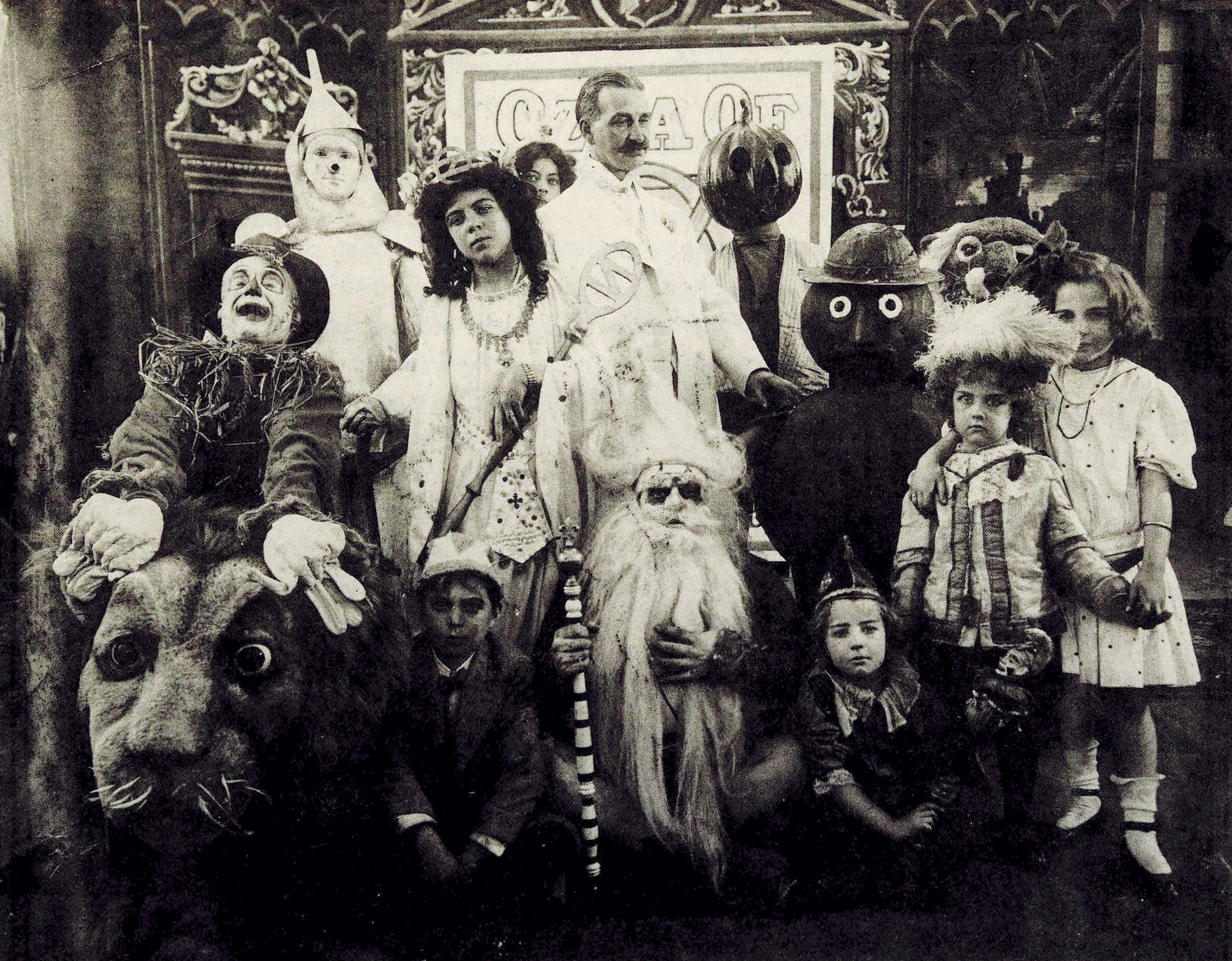
L. Frank Baum surrounded by the characters in The Fairylogue and Radio-Plays

The Fairylogue and Radio-Plays was produced by the Selig Polyscope Company in Chicago, and Remus was paid $5.00 per day for her performance. Remus was cast in the film by L. Frank Baum himself.

After the film was completed, Remus and other cast members toured with L. Frank Baum. "Mr. Baum himself took the film on the road and narrated the story onstage," Remus said. "There was an orchestra and we stood offstage, singing occasionally. . . . I remember that after the film, I would come onstage to take a bow and then go to the back of the theater and sell the Oz books" Remus recalled.

Remus also appeared in other early silent films, including Mary: Ten Nights in a Bar Room and The Four-Footed Hero. When Chicago's film studios relocated to Hollywood, her parents decided that she should stay in Chicago, and her film career ended.

== Father's legal problems ==
In 1918, her parents separated, and later divorced. Her father married Imogene Holmes, and relocated to Cincinnati, Ohio. Romola Remus was devoted to her father. In Cincinnati, he began defending accused bootleggers, and later became a successful bootlegger himself, acquiring control of the Fleischmann Company distillery. In 1925, George Remus was convicted of violating the Volstead Act and spent two years in federal prison. During that time, his wife began an affair with Franklin Dodge, a government agent. Upon his release from prison, George Remus shot and killed his estranged wife. He was prosecuted for murder, but acquitted on the basis of temporary insanity. Romola Remus was at his side in the courtroom constantly during his trial, and took a job as a cabaret singer to help pay his legal bills.

When George Remus was released from a brief stay at the Lima State Hospital for the Criminally Insane in Lima, Ohio, Romola Remus said, "I am the happiest girl in the world."

== Later years ==
Following her work in silent films, she became a vaudeville performer and an instructor of dance and music. In the last dozen years of her life, she was an organist at Chicago's 12th Church of Christ Scientist.

In 1984, Remus appeared at the 28th annual "Ozmopolitan" fan convention, organized by The International Wizard of Oz Club, where she sang several songs, including "I Was a Flora Dora Baby", originally popularized by Fanny Brice in the Ziegfeld Follies. She also appeared in the 1985 Public Broadcasting System documentary The Whimsical World of Oz, which was released at the same time as the Walt Disney theatrical film Return to Oz.

She died in a Chicago hospital on February 17, 1987.
