= River Oaks Center =

- Location: Calumet City, Illinois, United States
- Coordinates: 41.5979°N 87.555°W
- Opened: October 1966
- Developer: Philip M. Klutznick
- Manager: Mason Asset Management
- Owner: Namdar Realty Group
- Num. of stores: 62
- Num. of anchor tenants: 4 (2 open, 1 vacant, 1 being redeveloped)
- Floor area: 1,288,000 square feet (119,659.1 m^{2})
- Floors: 1 plus partial lower level (2 in JCPenney, former Carson Pirie Scott, and former Sears, 3 in Macy's)
- Public transit: Pace
- Website: shopriveroakscenter.com

River Oaks Center is a shopping mall in Calumet City, Illinois, a suburb south of Chicago. River Oaks Center is the seventh largest mall in the Chicago metropolitan area totaling 1,379,824 square feet (128,190 m^{2}). Today, there are over 60 stores and two anchors including JCPenney and Macy's with two vacant anchors last occupied by Carson's and Sears. Namdar Realty Group and Mason Asset Management manages and owns River Oaks Center.

== History ==
It opened in 1966 and was a development of KLC Ventures, a firm that included the pioneering developer Philip M. Klutznick and his son Tom. The elder Klutznick had developed Park Forest, Illinois, after World War II, as well as Oakbrook Center in Oak Brook in 1962 and Old Orchard Shopping Center in Skokie in 1956.

River Oaks originally opened as an outdoor shopping center with one minor and two major department stores. The original anchors were Marshall Field's, which built a 275,000-square-foot (25,500 m^{2}) store, Sears, and a branch of Edward C. Minas Company, which was based in nearby Hammond, Indiana. Other major stores included a Jewel supermarket and Osco Drug at the south end, and a S. S. Kresge dime store next to Sears. Kresge closed in 1987 and became a movie theater, while the closure of Jewel made way for a McDonald's restaurant and a second theater complex. Many of the stores in the mall in its first 20 years were outposts of Chicago retailers, including Chas A. Stevens, Kroch's and Brentano's and C.D. Peacock. Carson Pirie Scott took over the Edward C. Minas store in 1982.

In 1985, the mall was expanded when JCPenney moved its store from downtown Hammond, Indiana, to the northwest portion of the mall's parking lot. A new wing was also built to connect JCPenney to the mall and a food court was added on the enclosed lower level.

In the late 1980s and early 1990s, the then owner, JMB Corp. of Chicago, had several plans to expand and enclose the outdoor mall. These plans included adding a second level and possibly a fifth department store at the end of the southeastern wing of the mall. These plans coincided with Chicago's Lake Calumet Airport which would have been just a few miles north of the mall and would have transformed the area around the mall into an office and business hub. However, these plans never materialized and finally, in 1993, JMB began a smaller version of the redevelopment which included additional retail space and enclosing the common areas mall.

In 1994, the redevelopment was completed. The mall was enclosed and 80,000 square feet (7,000 m^{2}) of gross leasable area was added. New retailers opened at the mall and the tenant mix became more upscale bringing in some retailers who had not yet located in the Southern Suburbs. The mall's size was brought up to 1,380,000 square feet (128,000 m^{2}) making it the largest mall in the South Suburbs.

Carson Pirie Scott, by then renamed Carson's, closed in January 2013. Sears closed on June 9, 2013.

On June 4, 2020, JCPenney announced that it would close, as part of a plan to close 154 stores nationwide. However in August 2020, it was announced that this store would stay open.

In late 2019, a new anchor to the southeast wing of the mall was proposed, the Southland Live Casino. If approved by the Illinois Gaming Board, a temporary casino would have initially opened in the former Carson's, until a permanent 150,000 square foot casino was constructed, followed by a 200 room hotel. The site was expected to be approved by October 2020, but the decision was delayed due to the COVID-19 pandemic. In October 2021, the casino proposal was rejected by state regulators.

Plans have also begun to redevelop the former Sears site. This would involve demolishing the former Sears anchor space to make way for a mixed-use development on the anchor parcel.

== Bus routes ==
Pace

- 353 95th/Dan Ryan CTA/Calumet City/Homewood
- 358 Torrence
- 364 159th Street
