= Spring House Gazebo =

Historic structure in Cincinnati, Ohio

Coordinates: 39°06′51″N 84°29′37″W

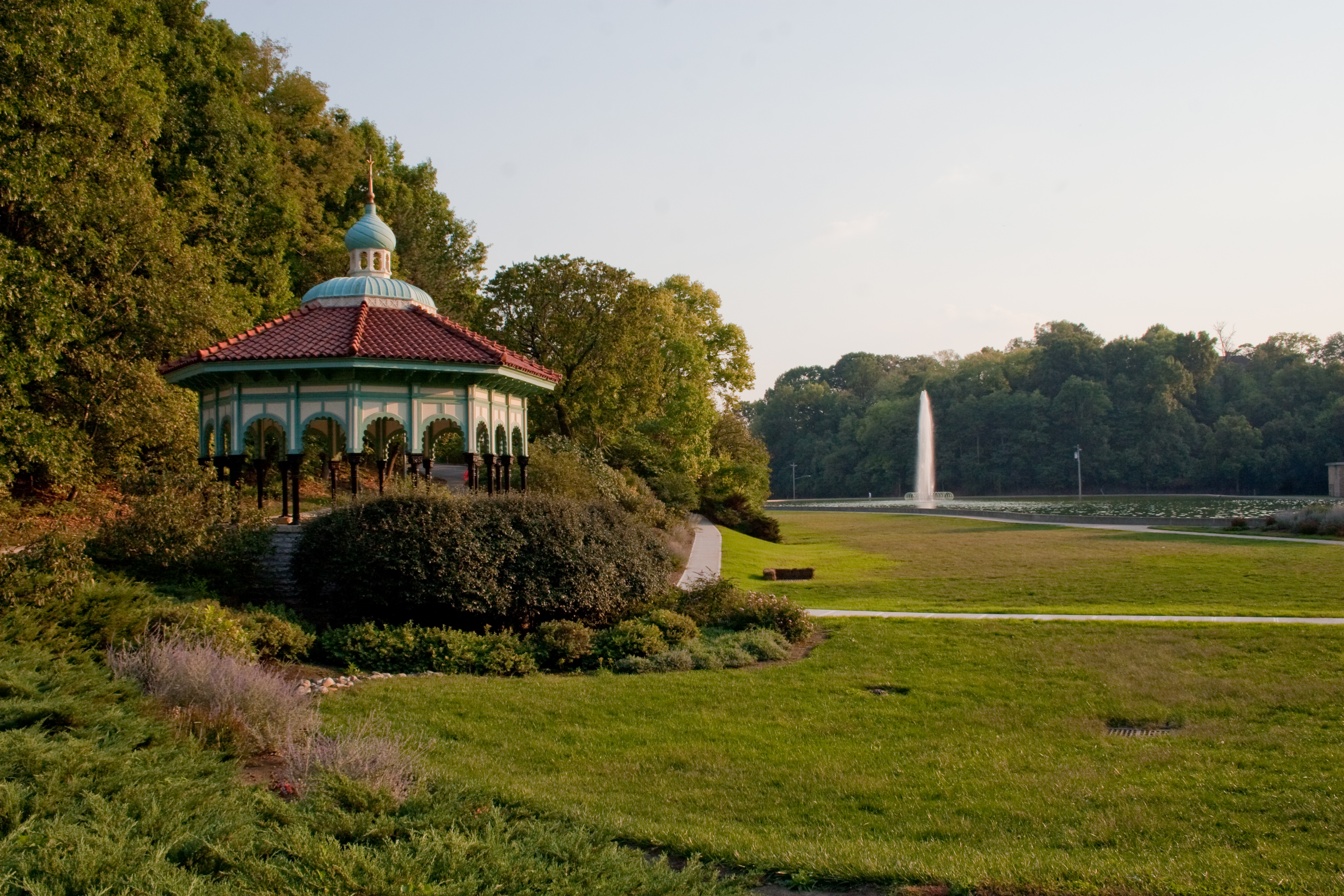
Spring House Gazebo with Mirror Lake in background

The Spring House Gazebo is a historic gazebo of Eden Park within Cincinnati, Ohio, in the United States. Designed by architect Cornelius M. Foster and completed in 1904 (121 years ago), it is the oldest enduring park structure in the Cincinnati municipal park system. As an icon of the entire park system, it appears in the logo of the Cincinnati Park Board. The gazebo was constructed in the Moorish style, with brightly painted arches and ball finials.

The gazebo took its name from the old spring house it replaced. Said to have therapeutic qualities, locals hauled away the spring water by the bucketful until the spring was found to be contaminated. The well was sealed off in 1912.

The Spring House Gazebo stands near the center of the park next to Mirror Lake, a large reflecting pool and former city reservoir with a walkway around its perimeter. The seasonal fountain in Mirror Lake shoots water 60 feet (18 m) in the air and can be seen from miles away from the hilltop park.

== Remus incident ==
In 1925, popular Cincinnati attorney and bootlegger George Remus was indicted for thousands of violations of the Volstead Act, convicted by a jury that made its decision in under two hours, and given a two-year federal prison sentence. He spent two years in Atlanta Federal Penitentiary for bootlegging. While he was in prison, Remus befriended another inmate and told him his wife whom he adored, Imogene, had control over his money. The inmate was an undercover prohibition agent Franklin Dodge. Dodge resigned his job and started an affair with Imogene. The pair liquidated Remus' assets and hid as much of the money as possible, in addition to attempting to deport Remus, and even hiring a hit man to murder Remus for $15,000. In addition, Remus's huge Fleischmann distillery was sold by Imogene, who gave her imprisoned husband only $100 of the multimillion-dollar empire he created.

Imogene then filed for divorce from Remus in late 1927. On the way to court, on October 6, 1927, for the finalization of the divorce, Remus had his driver chase the cab carrying Imogene and her daughter through Eden Park in Cincinnati, finally forcing it off the road. Remus jumped out and fatally shot Imogene in the abdomen in front of the Spring House Gazebo. George Remus acted as his own lawyer and defended himself as a man driven mad by his wife's adultery, thievery, and betrayal. He was ultimately acquitted in one of the first successful cases of the insanity defense.

Legend has it that the ghost of Imogene Remus haunts the gazebo. Since that time, there have been reports of a ghost wearing a black dress in and around the gazebo, gazing at a reflecting pool nearby. Alleged sightings are usually at dusk in the autumn season.
