= George Remus =

German-born American lawyer and bootlegger (1878–1952)

- Born: November 14, 1878; Landsberg, Bavaria, German Empire
- Died: January 20, 1952 (aged 73); Covington, Kentucky, U.S.
- Resting place: Riverside Cemetery
- Other name: King of the Bootleggers
- Citizenship: American
- Education: Chicago College of Pharmacy; Illinois College of Law, later acquired by DePaul University
- Occupations: Lawyer, pharmacist, bootlegger
- Spouses: Lillian Klauff (m. 1899; div. 1920) Augusta Imogene Brown Holmes (m. 1920; died 1927) Blanche Watson (before 1952)
- Children: Romola Remus

George Remus (November 14, 1878 – January 20, 1952) was a German-born American lawyer who was a bootlegger during the early days of Prohibition, and later murdered his wife Imogene.

== Early life ==
Remus was born in Landsberg, Germany, on November 13, 1876, to Frank and Marie Remus. Remus arrived in the United States on June 15, 1882, (departing from Norway on the Fifington to New York) and briefly lived in Maryland, then Wisconsin and finally moved to Chicago in 1885. At age 14, George supported the family by working at his uncle's pharmacy because Remus's father was unable to work. After graduating from the Chicago College of Pharmacy at the age of 19, Remus became a certified pharmacist, and bought his first pharmacy at the age of 21. Remus married Lillian Klauff on July 10, 1899, after a quick courtship.

Within five years, Remus expanded, buying another drugstore. However, he soon tired of the long working hours of the pharmacy business, and by age 24 he had become a lawyer.

== Career ==
Remus attended the Illinois College of Law (later merged with DePaul University College of Law) and was admitted to the Illinois Bar in 1904. Remus specialized in criminal defense, especially murder, and became quite famous, due in large part to the highly publicized William Cheney Ellis murder case in 1914. It was in this case that Remus pioneered the "transitory insanity" defense that evolved into what is now known as the "temporary insanity" defense. By 1920, Remus was earning $500,000 a year, approximately $8,036,000 today.

Following the ratification of the 18th Amendment and the passage of the Volstead Act, on January 17, 1920, Prohibition began in the US. Within a few months, Remus saw that his criminal clients were becoming very wealthy very quickly through the illegal production and distribution of alcoholic beverages. He decided to become a criminal himself, using his knowledge of the law to escape punishment.

Remus memorized the Volstead Act and found a loophole which allowed him to buy distilleries and pharmacies to produce and sell bonded liquor for medicinal purposes, under government licenses. His employees would then hijack his own liquor so that he could sell it illegally. Remus moved to Cincinnati, where 80 percent of America's bonded whiskey was located within a 300-mile (480 km) radius, and bought up most of the whiskey manufacturers. In two years, he had bought and sold a seventh of the bonded liquor in America. In less than three years, with the help of his trusted number two man George Conners, Remus made $40 million and had about 3,000 people working for him. He owned many of America's most famous distilleries, including the Fleischmann Distillery. Many small towns, such as Newport, Kentucky, became drinking towns where gamblers opened small casinos to entertain their drunken patrons.

One of Remus's fortified distilleries was the so-called "Death Valley Farm", in Westwood, Cincinnati, which he purchased from George Gehrum. The outside world thought it was only accessible by dirt road. The actual distillery was located at 2656 Queen City Ave. The alcohol was distilled in the attic of the house then dumb-waitered below. A trap door was located in the basement, which was the entrance to a tunnel about 50 to 100 feet (15 to 30 m) long and 6 feet (1.8 m) under the ground.

In addition to becoming the "King of the Bootleggers", Remus was known as a gracious host. He held many parties, including a 1923 birthday party for his wife Imogene, in which she appeared in a daring bathing suit along with other aquatic dancers, serenaded by a fifteen-piece orchestra. Local children saw Remus as a fatherly figure, and some played on the estate. In 1922, Remus and his wife held a New Year's Eve party at their new mansion, nicknamed the Marble Palace. The guests included one hundred couples from the most prestigious families in the area. As parting gifts, Remus presented all the men with diamond stickpins, and gave each guest's wife a brand new car. He held a similar party in June 1923, while he was having problems with the government, at which he gave each female guest (of the fifty present) a brand new car.

== Family life ==
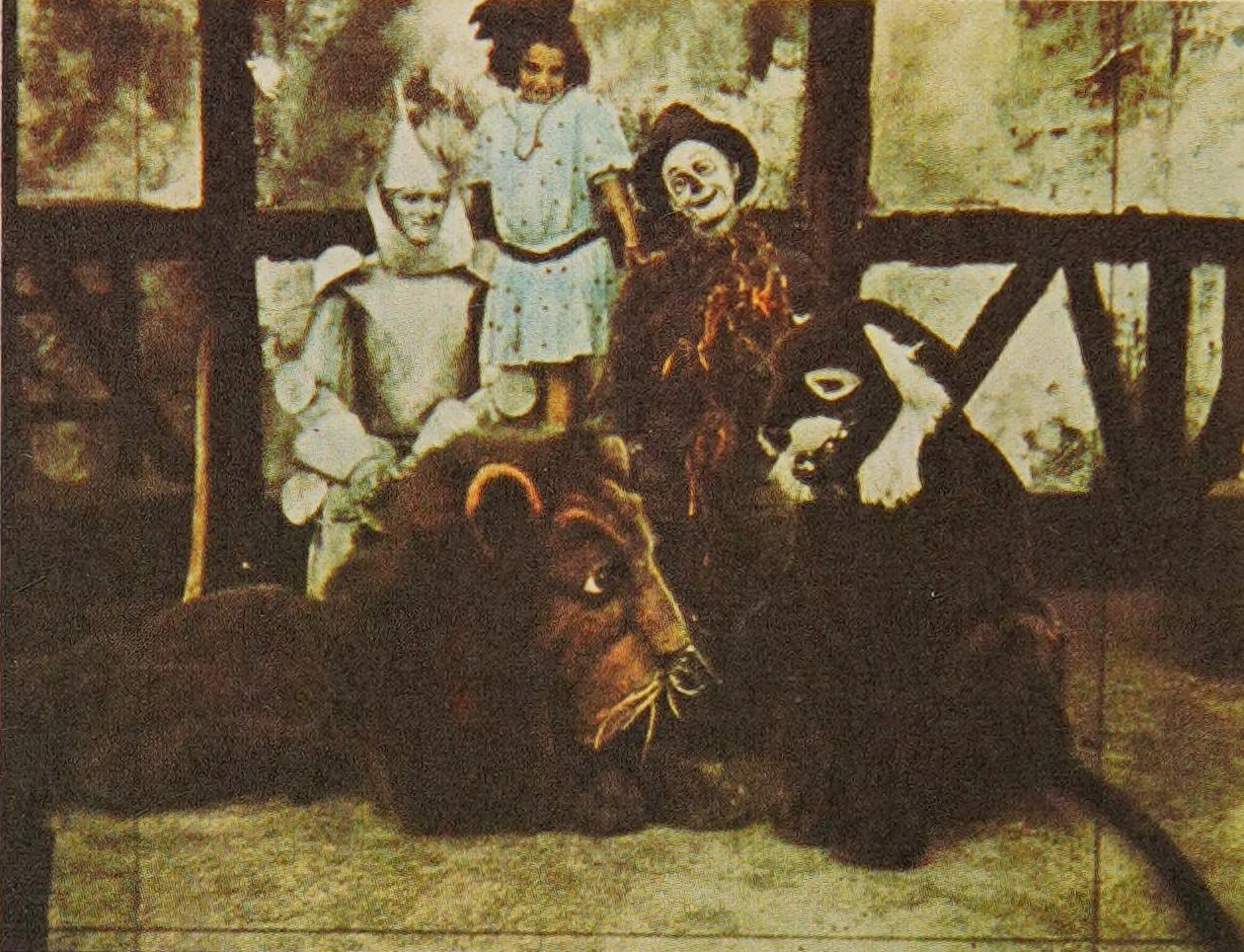
Romola Remus The Fairylogue and Radio-Plays

On July 20, 1899, Remus married Lillian Klauff. Their daughter, born in 1900, was Romola Remus, who became a child actress in silent films, playing cinema's first Dorothy Gale in the 1908 short film of The Wizard of Oz when she was eight years old. The marriage ended in divorce in 1920 after Remus began an affair with his legal secretary, Augusta Imogene Holmes (née Brown). Holmes was a young divorcée with a young daughter, Ruth. Remus and Holmes were married in Newport, Kentucky, in June 1920.

== Legal issues ==
In 1925, Remus's plan to use his legal knowledge to evade the law went awry. He was indicted for thousands of violations of the Volstead Act, convicted by a jury that made its decision in under two hours, and given a two-year federal prison sentence. He spent two years in Atlanta Federal Penitentiary for bootlegging. While he was in prison, Remus befriended another inmate and eventually confided in him that his wife, Imogene Holmes, had control over his money. The inmate was an undercover prohibition agent, Franklin Dodge, who was there to gather information of that sort. Instead of reporting the information, Dodge resigned his job and began an affair with Remus's wife. Dodge and Holmes liquidated Remus's assets and hid as much of the money as possible. In addition, Remus's Fleischmann Distillery was sold by Holmes. Remus's wife gave her imprisoned husband only $100 of the multimillion-dollar empire he created. Holmes and Dodge attempted to deport Remus, and even hired a hit man to murder Remus for $15,000. The would-be assassin didn't follow through because he feared being double-crossed, and told Remus about the plot instead.

In late 1927, Imogene Holmes filed for divorce from Remus. On the way to court, on October 6, 1927, for the finalization of the divorce, Remus had his driver chase the cab carrying Holmes and her daughter through Eden Park in Cincinnati, finally forcing it off the road. Remus jumped out and fatally shot Imogene in the abdomen in front of the Spring House Gazebo to the horror of park onlookers.

The prosecutor in the case was 30-year-old Charles Phelps Taft II, son of Chief Justice of the United States and former President William Howard Taft and brother of the future Senator Robert A. Taft. Although he had lost his last big case against another bootlegger, Taft was seen as a man with a bright political future. The trial made national headlines for a month, as Remus defended himself on the murder charge with the help of Charles Elston. His first wife and daughter stayed by him; his step-daughter testified against him and depicted Remus as an abusive husband. Remus pleaded transitory insanity, which he had used previously during his time as a defense lawyer, emphasizing his distress at his wife's betrayal. The jury deliberated only nineteen minutes before acquitting him. The State of Ohio committed Remus to an insane asylum since the jury found him insane, but prosecutors were thwarted by their previous claim (backed up by the prosecution's three well-known psychiatrists) that he could be tried for murder because he was not insane, and Remus was freed from the asylum after only 7 months.

== Later life and legacy ==
After his release from the institution in Lima, he was an informal tutor to another well-known Cincinnati lawyer, William Foster Hopkins, for a period of about six years. George Remus later moved to Covington, Kentucky (across the Ohio River from Cincinnati), where he lived modestly the next 20 years without incident. He married for a third and final time to his long-time secretary Blanche Watson. Remus ran a small contracting firm, Washington Contracting, until he suffered a stroke in August 1950. For the next two years, he lived in a boarding house in Covington in the care of a nurse. Remus died on January 20, 1952, at the age of 75. He is buried beside his third wife at Riverside Cemetery in Falmouth, Kentucky.

Remus is sometimes credited as the direct inspiration for The Great Gatsby, though Gatsby might have been based on one of several figures such as Arnold Rothstein.

== In popular culture ==
Remus was featured in the 2011 Ken Burns documentary Prohibition; texts written by Remus were read by Paul Giamatti.

Remus was portrayed by Glenn Fleshler on HBO's Prohibition-era series Boardwalk Empire, beginning in its second season. In this series, he is portrayed as having the quirk of referring to himself in the third person, which Remus was known to do.
