= Henry Haven Windsor =

American writer

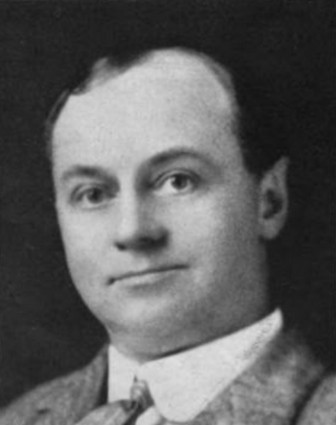
- Born: November 13, 1859; Mitchell, Iowa, US
- Died: May 11, 1924 (aged 64); Evanston, Illinois, US
- Occupations: Editor, publisher
- Known for: Founder and first editor of Popular Mechanics

Henry Haven Windsor (November 13, 1859 – May 11, 1924), American writer, magazine editor, and publisher, was the founder and first editor of Popular Mechanics. He was succeeded as editor by his son, Henry Haven Windsor, Jr (1898–1965). Windsor also published Cartoons Magazine from 1912 to 1922. Windsor was born in a log cabin in Mitchell, Iowa, the son of Rev. William D. D. Windsor and Harriet Butler (Holmes) Windsor. He attended Iowa College (later known as Grinnell College), graduating in 1884. On June 25, 1889, he married Lina B. Jackson in Marengo, Illinois.

From 1879 to 1880, he served as city editor of the Marshalltown, Iowa Times-Republican. During 1881–82 he was private secretary to officials of the Northern Pacific Railway in Saint Paul, Minnesota. From 1883 to 1891, he was secretary of the Chicago City Railway. In 1892 he founded the magazine Street Railway Review, serving as editor and president. He also founded Brick and Rural Free Delivery News. Beginning in 1901, he was editor and president of the magazine Popular Mechanics.

As of 1922, Windsor maintained homes in Evanston, Illinois (at 1120 Forrest Avenue); Camden, Maine, and Daytona Beach, Florida. His office address was 6 North Michigan Avenue in Chicago.

Windsor gave his political affiliation as Republican and his religious affiliation as Congregationalist. He was a member of several clubs, including the Press Club, Chicago Athletic Club, South Shore Country Club, Chicago Yacht Club, National Press Club in Washington, D. C, University Club in Evanston, Illinois, Atlantic Yacht Club, and the Camden Yacht Club in Camden, Maine. He was a member of the first board of directors of the Hamilton Club.

Windsor died at his home in Evanston on May 11, 1924. He is buried in Rosehill Cemetery and Mausoleum in Chicago.
