= Cartoons Magazine =

American magazine

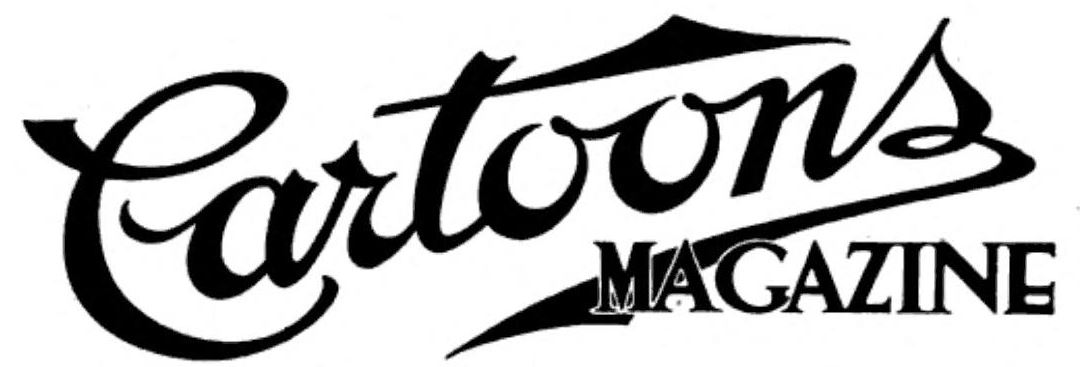

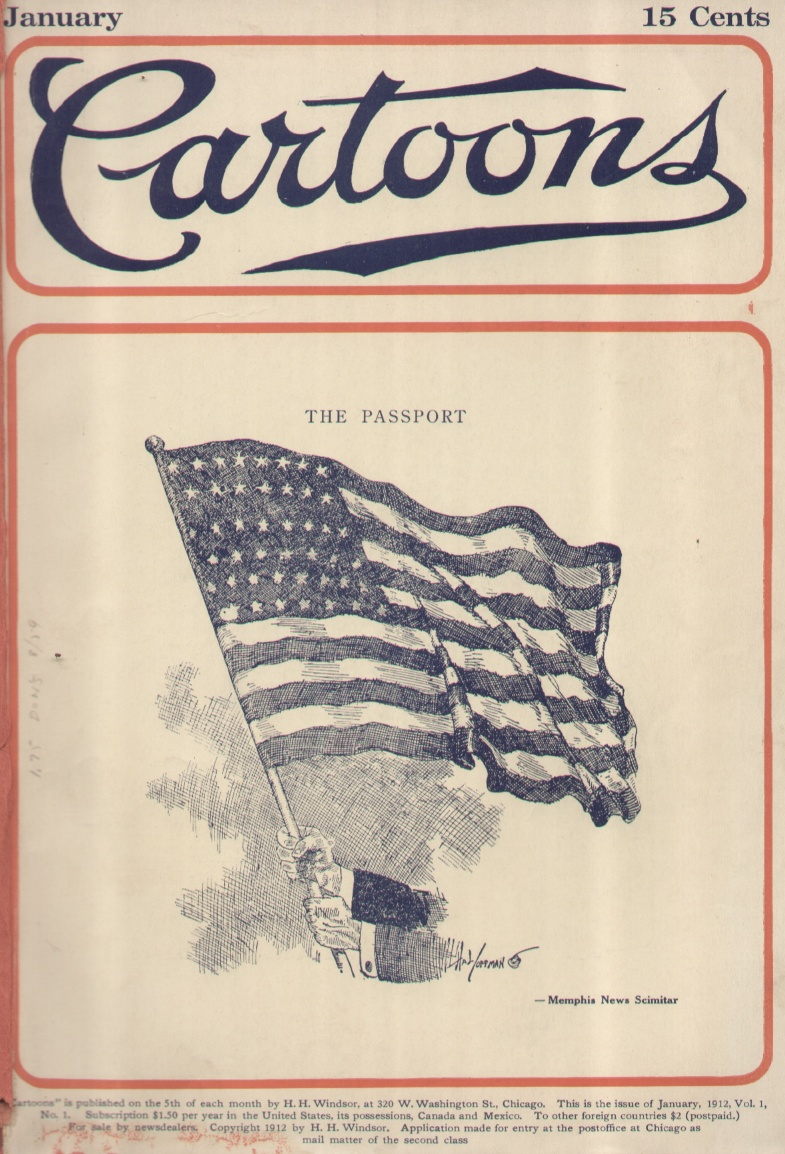
- Cartoons, Vol. 1, Issue 1, January 1912
- Editor-In-Chief: H. H. Windsor
- Frequency: Monthly
- First issue: January 1, 1912
- Final issue: 1922
- Country: United States
- Based in: Chicago, Illinois
- Language: English

Cartoons Magazine featured editorial cartoons from American and foreign newspapers.

Cartoons Magazine was published from 1912 to 1922. The publisher, Henry Haven Windsor, had previously published Popular Mechanics. The magazine was advertised as "a symposium of world caricature." It claimed to present "What the World's Nations Think of Each Other."

== History and profile ==
Cartoons Magazine was founded in Chicago by Henry Haven Windsor, with the first issue appearing in January 1912. In 1921, the format and title of the magazine changed. With the July 1921 issue, the format was changed with its political content being supplemented with illustrated adventure tales and the title was changed to Cartoons Magazine and Wayside Tales. The title was again changed to Wayside Tales and Cartoons Magazine with the August 1921 issue. In January 1922, the title was changed to Wayside Tales, and the magazine ceased publication with the May 1922 issue.

The first issue of Cartoons featured 64 pages of editorial cartoons, reprinted from newspapers across the United States and Europe. The cartoons were grouped by subject, such as Teddy Roosevelt, Russia, European and world affairs, fashion, crime, baseball, etc. Early issues consisted mainly of reproductions of cartoons. Later issues also featured profiles of editorial cartoonists, news about cartoonists, and text editorials, as well as original cartoons. Some regular text features of the magazine were What The Cartoonists Are Doing, which discussed noteworthy cartoons and cartoonists, employment changes, and deaths of notable cartoonists; Under The Big Dome, covering events in Washington, D.C.; and The Road To Yesterday, featuring historic cartoons from earlier periods.

A nearly complete archive of Cartoons Magazine issues from 1912 through 1922 is available through HathiTrust.
