= John Dough =

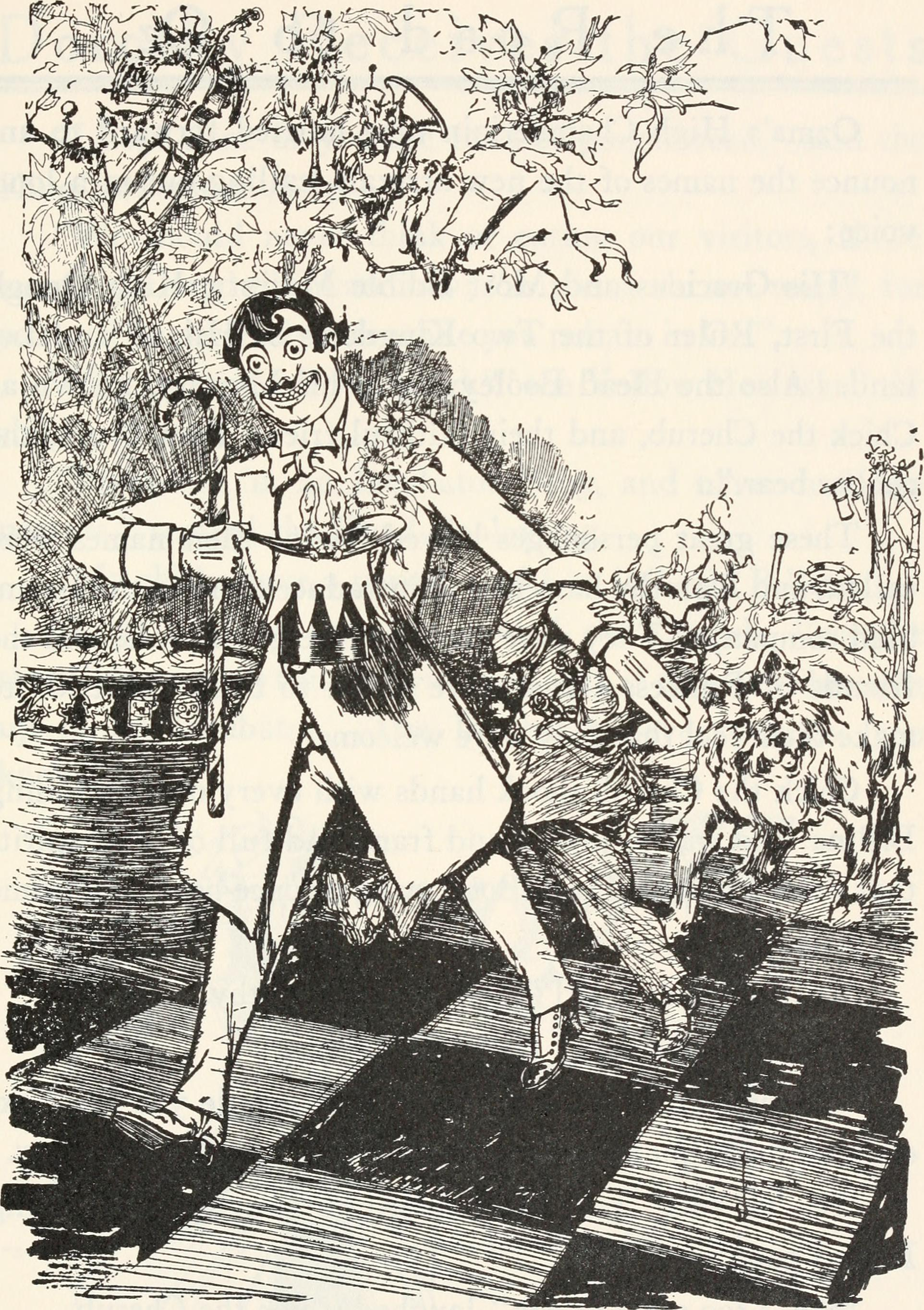
- Illustration by John R. Neill from The Road to Oz (1909)
- First appearance: John Dough and the Cherub (1906)
- Created by: L. Frank Baum

In-universe information
- Nickname: The Gingerbread Man
- Species: Living Gingerbread Man
- Gender: male
- Title: King of Hiland and Loland
- Occupation: king
- Nationality: American

John Dough was a common name for a gingerbread man at the turn of the 20th century, though the best-remembered John Dough is the character created by L. Frank Baum in his 1906 novel, John Dough and the Cherub; the character also makes a cameo appearance in Baum's The Road to Oz. If the fragment known as "An Oz Book" is genuine, Baum may have intended to include John Dough in his fifteenth Oz book had he lived to write it.

== Baum's character ==
John Dough was a life sized gingerbread man baked for a celebration of Independence Day, and brought to life by a mad Arab's elixir. Much of the book deals with the Arab's attempts to eat John Dough, for the elixir, which he had intended to drink to become immortal, was accidentally mixed into the batter that made him. John is carried off in a rocket and lands at the Isle of Phreex, a Jonathan Swift-like asylum for human oddities. There, he befriends Chick the Cherub, the world's first incubator baby, whose gender is never specified. Eventually the two are forced to escape along with Para Bruin, the Rubber Bear, and they visit the constant theatre of the Palace of Romance, the Fairy Beavers of Mifket Island, and others, all while John tries to avoid being eaten.

John Dough loses his coat-tails to birds but manages to keep his body intact. He ultimately sacrifices his hand to save a dying princess.

At the end of the novel, he is made the King of Hiland and Loland, an island dual country, and Chick becomes his Grand Booleywag, who rules the ruler. John fulfills a prophecy that will end the warring between the kingdoms and establishes the capital city of HiLo. One of the Los bakes him a new hand, and he passes a law against the eating of gingerbread more than two days old.

In The Road to Oz, John Dough, Chick the Cherub, and Para Bruin are seen at Princess Ozma's birthday party.

In the fragmentary "An Oz Book" (Baum Bugle, Christmas 1965), a man named Gipper-Gupper-Gopp claims to have come from Hiland to the outskirts of the Emerald City.

== Adaptations ==
Joseph Schrode played John Dough in The Fairylogue and Radio-Plays. It is unknown who played the role in the lost 1910 film, John Dough and the Cherub.

A. Baldwin Sloane, who had contributed to The Wizard of Oz, wrote a musical called The Gingerbread Man around 1906. The main character was named John Dough and sings a song of that title, but had nothing to do with Baum's character, and had no particular qualms about being eaten.
