= John Dough and the Cherub =

1906 novel by L. Frank Baum

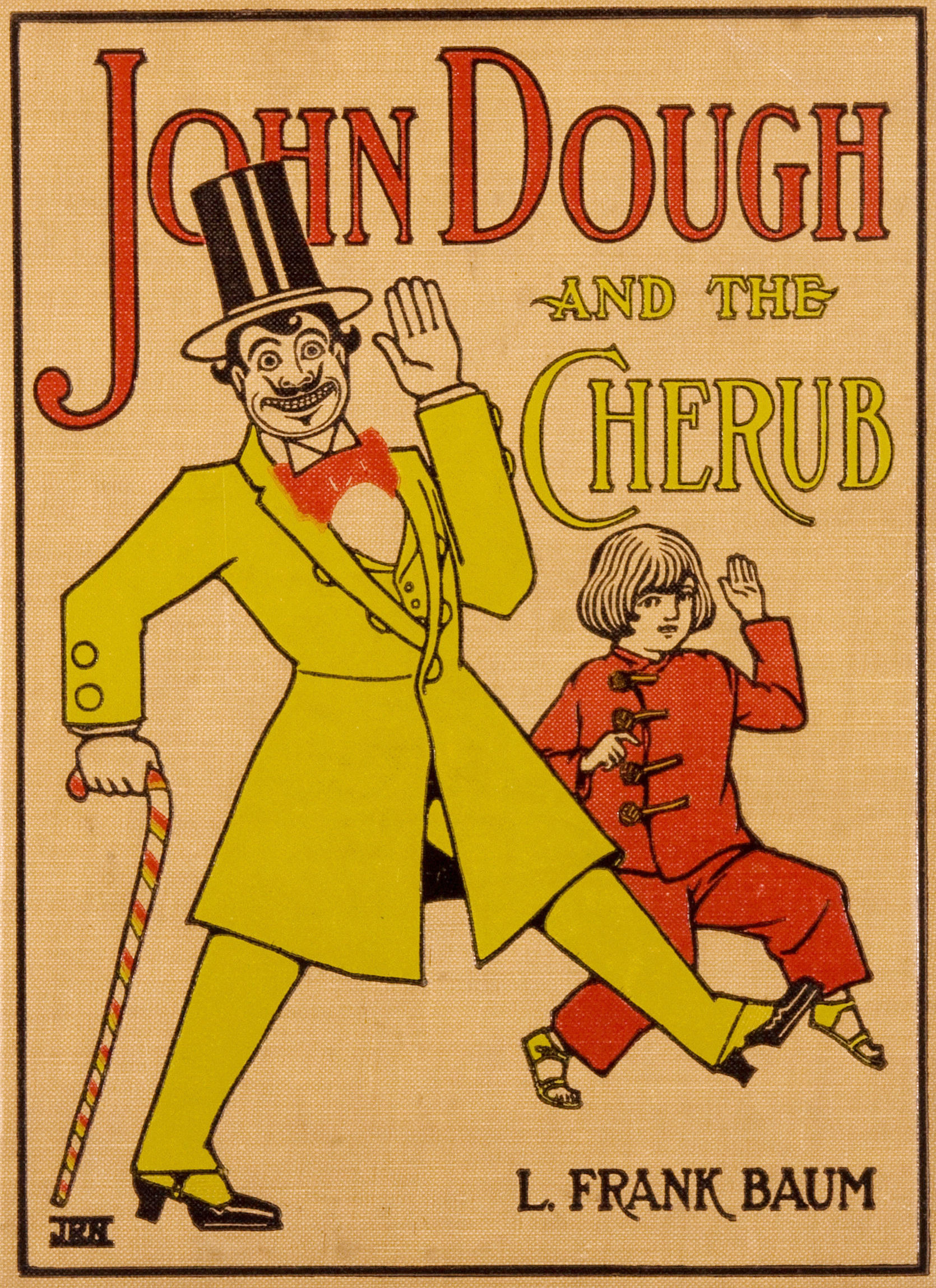
- Author: L. Frank Baum
- Illustrator: John R. Neill
- Language: English
- Genre: Children's novel
- Publisher: Reilly & Britton
- Publication date: 1906
- Publication place: United States
- Media type: Print (hardcover)

John Dough and the Cherub is a children's fantasy novel, written by American author L. Frank Baum, about a living gingerbread man and his adventures. It was illustrated by John R. Neill and published in 1906 by the Reilly & Britton Company. The story was serialized in the Washington Sunday Star and other newspapers from October to December 1906. Like the Oz books but unlike many of the author's other works, John Dough was issued under Baum's name rather than one of his pseudonyms. The book was popular; as late as 1919 it was selling 1500 copies a year. The 1974 Dover Publications edition features an introduction by Martin Gardner.

== Gender ambiguity ==
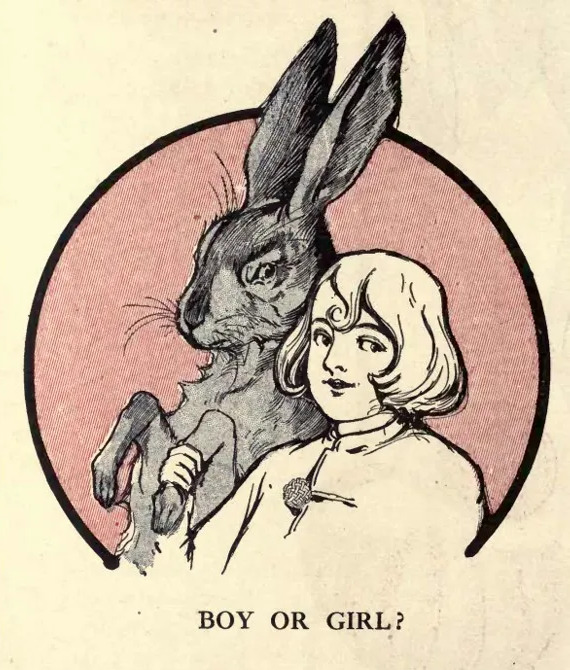
John R. Neill's illustration of Chick the Cherub with the caption "Boy or girl?"

Throughout his text, Baum is careful never to specify the sex of the character Chick the Cherub, even to the point of referring to Chick as "it" instead of "he" or "she". Chick dresses in androgynous pajamas; Neill pictures Chick in a Buster Brown haircut that could fit either a boy or a girl.

The publishers wanted Baum to resolve the ambiguity, but he refused. Eventually they made the best of the situation: in the publicity campaign for the original edition, Reilly & Britton conducted a contest in which the book's child readers could vote on Chick's sex. The children who gave the best answers, in 25 words or less, won prizes. The contest was presented as a detachable form in front of the first edition of the book, to be detached, filled out, and mailed to the publisher; first editions with the contest-page intact are rare collector's items.

The contest's second-place prize was won by a boy who read the story in the Seattle Times. His entry read, "The Cherub was a girl because if it had been a boy he would have eaten the ginger-bread man at once whether it agreed with him or not." However, no citations exist that identify the contest winner(s).

== Synopsis ==
The story begins in the bakery of Jules and Leontine Grogrande, French immigrants to the United States. Their mysterious local customer Ali Dubh the Arab comes to the bakery one day with an urgent request. He is being pursued by three of his countrymen, because he possesses the Great Elixir — "the Essence of Vitality, the Water of Life." A mere drop of this liquid can endow a person with pronounced health, strength, and longevity. Ali Dubh pleads with Madame Grogrande to hide the golden vial of the Elixir for him. She is reluctant, but relents when the Arab also provides her with a silver vial that contains a cure for her rheumatism.

In addition to being rheumatic, Leontine is also colorblind. She confuses the gold and silver bottles. She pours the Great Elixir into a bowl of water and bathes her sore limbs in it. Instantly the pain is gone and she feels "as light and airy as a fairy...It occurred to her that she would like to dance; to run and shout, to caper about as she used to do as a girl." Since she is a sensible older woman, she goes to bed instead, leaving the bowl of diluted elixir in the kitchen.

Her husband Jules comes into the bakery at 3:00 AM; it is the Fourth of July, and he decides to bake a large gingerbread man to display in his store window. He mixes his dough – and uses the water in the bowl, which contains the elixir, at hand. He forms a gingerbread figure the size of a "fourteen-year-old boy," but in the shape and appearance of a "typical French gentleman." Jules gives the figure glass eyes, white candies for teeth, and lozenges for his suitcoat buttons. He bakes the gingerbread man in his oven – and is astonished to find that the figure comes to life when done. The full dose of the Great Elixir has endowed John Dough the gingerbread man not only with life, but with intelligence and multilingual speech. Jules flees in panic; John Dough equips himself with the baker's top hat and a candy-cane cane, and sets out to see the world.

Ali Dubh is outraged when he learns what has happened, but he also sees a solution for his problem. He simply needs to eat the gingerbread man to gain the benefits of the elixir. With that realization, the Arab sets out in pursuit of John Dough.

On the evening of the Fourth, John Dough accidentally hitches a ride on a large rocket launched during the festivities. The rocket carries him all the way to the Isle of Phreex. John falls from the sky onto a Fresh-Air Fiend, who was, naturally, sleeping outdoors. On Phreex, John encounters a cavalcade of odd beings. Most importantly, he meets the cryptic figure of Chick the Cherub, "the first and only Original Incubator Baby." Though only six years old (or eight depending on who is counting), Chick is a slang-talker, brave, and even-tempered. Chick becomes John's friend, companion, and protector in a strange new world. The inhabitants of Phreex — "the Freaks of Phreex," as they are called – are a wildly diverse lot. Among the more memorable are: an animated Wooden Indian; a girl executioner who never gets to kill anybody and weeps over the fact; a two-legged talking horse that bullies its rider; and the youthful and tyrannical "Kinglet" of Phreex. The Isle is also the home of crank inventors. One of them, the least cranky of the lot, has created a workable flying machine. Once Ali Dubh shows up on Phreex (he purchased a magic spell from a witch to magically follow his quarry), John and Chick depart in the flying machine for parts unknown.

Their first stop is a small island that contains the Palace of Romance. There, the heroes fall into a Sheherazade predicament: they need to keep telling stories to avoid being killed. They soon make their escape in the flying machine which crashes onto another island of strange creatures. They meet Pittypat, a talking white rabbit, and Para Bruin, a big and bouncing rubber bear. The Mifkets, who also inhabit the island, are malicious gnome-like beings who cause the protagonists major problems. Things get worse when Ali Dubh shows up and reveals to the Mifkets that John Dough is good to eat. The mifkets capture John and eat all the fingers of one of his hands before he is able to escape.

John sacrifices the rest of his mutilated hand to save the life of a pretty young girl trapped on the island, who is wasting away. His elixir-rich gingerbread flesh saves her life. Pittypat the rabbit introduces the heroes to the King of the Fairy Beavers, who accepts them into his subterranean domain and resolves their difficulties with his magic. The girl is restored to her parents, whom our heroes rescued from slavery in the Mifkets' kitchen. John and Chick, joined by Para Bruin, are borne into the sky by friendly flamingos. After a brief and unpleasant stop on Pirate Island, the flamingos carry the three adventurers to their final destination. Ali Dubh is left stranded on the Mifket island as his witch-bought transportation spell was good for two uses only.

The twin countries of Hiland and Loland occupy opposite halves of an island, separated by a high wall and a large and richly-furnished castle. The people of Hiland are tall and thin, and they live in tall thin houses; those of Loland are short and stout, with dwellings to match. The king who ruled the two lands has died and both peoples await the arrival of a prophesied, non-human replacement. John Dough fits the bill and he becomes the new King of Hiland and Loland. A local baker repairs the damage John has endured in his travels. Para Bruin becomes Chief Counselor while the Cherub claims the title of Head Booleywag — "the one that rules the ruler." Together, the three manage very well for many years to come — but the annals of Hiland and Loland never make clear whether Chick, the Head Booleywag, is male or female.

== Baum's fantasy cosmos ==
In 1905, Baum had published his most "classic" fairy tale Queen Zixi of Ix. With John Dough in the following year, Baum returned to the unique hybrid fantasy world of his Oz books and related works. Like Dorothy Gale, John Dough can travel (by air) from a contemporary United States (c. 1900) to extraordinary countries of the imagination; the types of creatures he meets are those of the world of Oz – fairies, talking animals, and animated artificial beings (scarecrow; wooden Indian). Chick the Cherub is another of Baum's unrealistically free-spirited and fearless child protagonists. (However, the character is implied to be much older than their appearance suggests.) The Great Elixir is comparable to the Powder of Life that is a key element in Baum's fantasy domain. Baum mixes technology into his Oz fantasies and into John Dough as well; aircraft and incubators were recent developments in 1906. The divided country of Hiland and Loland foreshadows the similarly divided country of Sky Island (1912). The "fairy beavers" are a kind of animal spirit Baum employs in his The Life and Adventures of Santa Claus. The gem-encrusted underground realm of the fairy beavers resembles the domain of the Nome King in the Oz books.

John Dough, Chick the Cherub, and Para Bruin make cameo appearances in the fifth Oz book The Road to Oz (1909) where they attend Princess Ozma's birthday party.

A mifket makes a brief appearance in the tenth Oz book, Rinkitink in Oz (1916). Illustrator Neill included the Mifkits (sic) in his own The Scalawagons of Oz (1941) and Jack Snow included the fairy beavers in The Shaggy Man of Oz (1949), which also contains a Valley of Romance, similar but not identical to the Palace of Romance.

== Adaptations ==
The novel has been adapted into film twice, both under the direction of Otis Turner, first as a 40-minute segment of The Fairylogue and Radio-Plays (1908), then again as a ten-minute short in 1910. Both of these films are lost.
