= The Fairylogue and Radio-Plays =

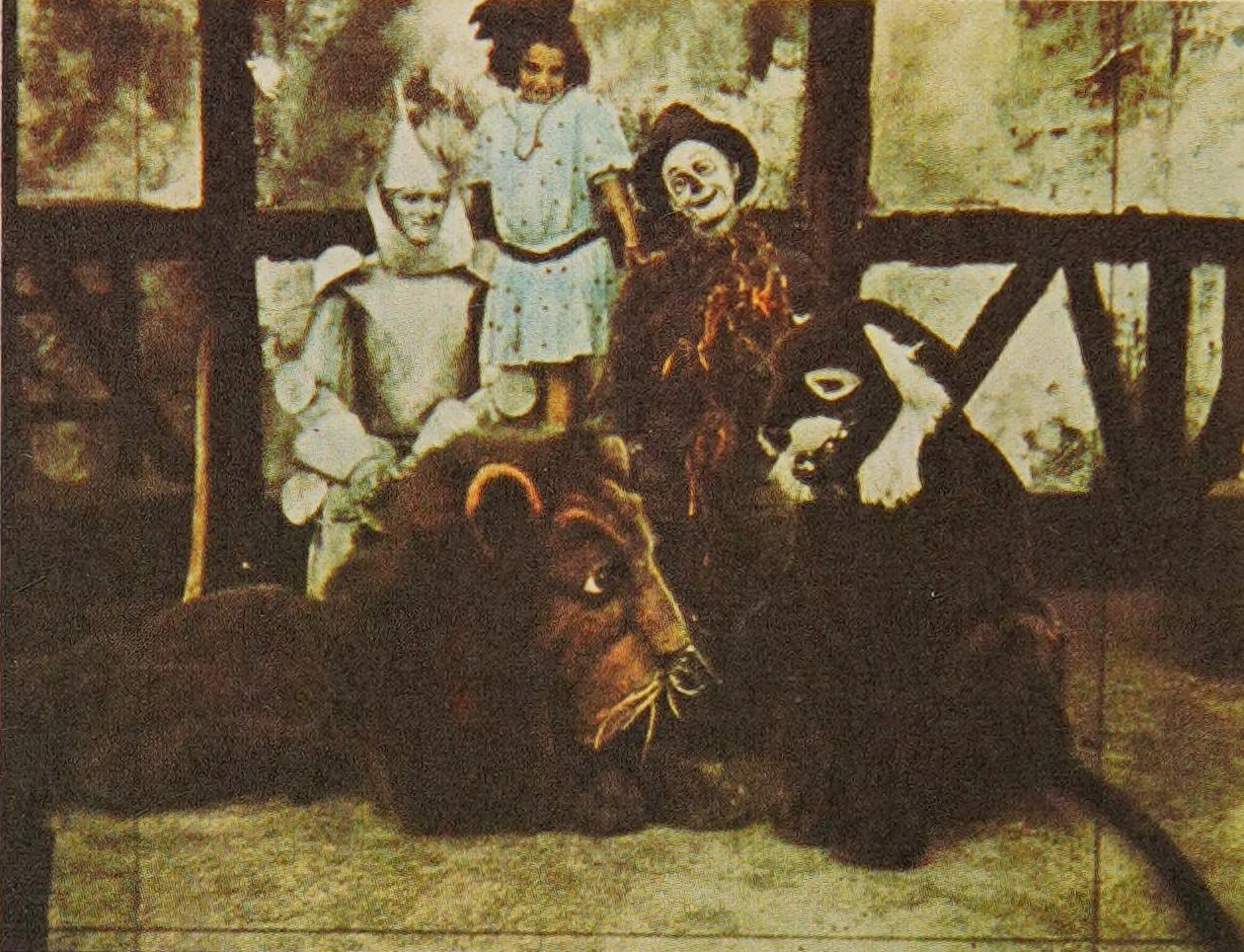
- One of the few surviving stills from the film displaying the quality of the Radio-Play coloring process.
- Directed by: Francis Boggs; Otis Turner
- Written by: L. Frank Baum
- Produced by: William Selig; John B. Shaw, Jr; L. Frank Baum
- Starring: L. Frank Baum; Romola Remus; Frank Burns; George E. Wilson; Joseph Schrode; Burns Wantling; Grace Elder
- Music by: Nathaniel D. Mann
- Production company: The Radio Play Company of America (*later First National Pictures)
- Distributed by: Selig Polyscope Company
- Release date: September 24, 1908
- Running time: 120 minutes (3600 m)
- Country: United States
- Language: English

The Fairylogue and Radio-Plays was an early attempt to bring L. Frank Baum's Oz books to the motion picture screen. It was a mixture of live actors, hand-tinted magic lantern slides, and film. Baum himself would appear as if he were giving a lecture, while he interacted with the characters (both on stage and on screen). Although acclaimed throughout its tour, the show experienced budgetary problems (with the show costing more to produce than the money that sold-out houses could bring in) and folded after two months of performances. It opened in Grand Rapids, Michigan on September 24, 1908. It then ran in Orchestra Hall in Chicago on October 1, toured the country and ended its run in New York City. There, it was scheduled to run through December 31, and ads for it continued to run in The New York Times until then, but it reportedly closed on December 16.

Although today seen mostly as a failed first effort to adapt the Oz books, The Fairylogue and Radio-Plays is notable in film history because it contains the earliest original film score to be documented.

The film is lost, but the script for Baum's narration and production stills survive.

== Michael Radio Color ==
The films were colored (credited as "illuminations") by Duval Frères of Paris, in a process known as "Radio-Play", and were noted for being the most lifelike hand-tinted imagery of the time. Baum once claimed in an interview that a "Michael Radio" was a Frenchman who colored the films, though no evidence of such a person, even with the more proper French spelling "Michel", as second-hand reports unsurprisingly revise it, has been documented. It did not refer to the contemporary concept of radio (or, for that matter, a radio play), but played on notions of the new and fantastic at the time, similar to the way "high-tech" or sometimes "cyber" would be used later in the century. The "Fairylogue" part of the title was to liken it to a travelogue, which at the time was a very popular type of documentary film entertainment.

== Original film score ==
The production also included a full original score consisting of 27 cues by Nathaniel D. Mann, who had previously set a couple of Baum's songs in The Wizard of Oz musical. It debuted four months before Camille Saint-Saëns's score for The Assassination of the Duke of Guise, and is therefore the earliest original film score to be documented.

== Adaptation ==
It was based on Baum's books The Wonderful Wizard of Oz, The Marvelous Land of Oz, Ozma of Oz and John Dough and the Cherub, with intermission slides showing previews of Dorothy and the Wizard in Oz, which was not sold in stores until near the end of the run. Francis Boggs directed the Oz material and Otis Turner directed John Dough and the Cherub. Baum, in a white suit, would step behind the screen and into the film, pulling his actors off to appear on stage with him. Surviving production stills depict a very large cast of Oz characters. Romola Remus was the silver screen's first Dorothy. Notably absent from this production is the Woggle-Bug, who had been the title character of a failed musical three years prior.

== Cast ==
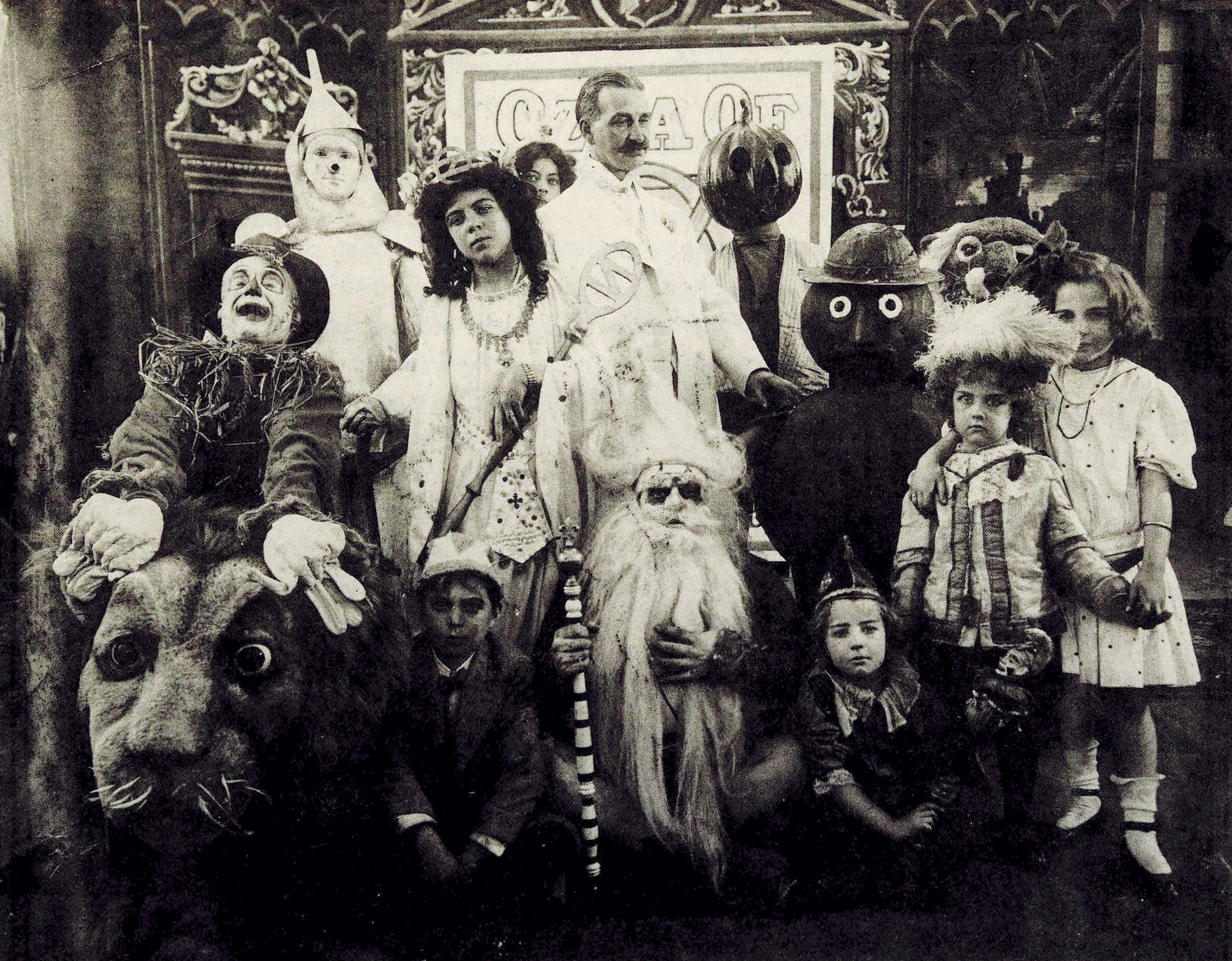
L. Frank Baum surrounded by the characters in The Fairylogue and Radio-Plays

(listed in the order credited in the program)

- L. Frank Baum as The Wizard of Oz Man, who will present his very merry, whimsical and really wonderful Fairylogue and Radio-Plays
- Frank Burns as His Majesty the Scarecrow. Also as The Rubber Bear, a Good Natured Thing
- George E. Wilson as Nick Chopper, the Tin Woodman and as The White Rabbit, Diffident, but not Shy
- Wallace Illington as Tik-Tok, the Machine Man
- Bronson Ward, Jr. as Jack Pumpkinhead, whose Brains are Seeds
- Paul de Dupont as The Nome King, a Master of Enchantments
- Will Morrison as Tip, a transformation, but a real boy
- Clarence Nearing as Prince Evring of Ev
- Sam 'Smiling' Jones as The Wizard (only a Humbug)
- Joseph Schrode as The Cowardly Lion and John Dough, the Gingerbread Man (Joseph also portrayed Imogene the cow (a replacement of Toto) in the earlier stage adaptation)
- Burns Wantling as The Hungry Tiger
- D. W. Clapperton as Sir Rooster, Visitor at the Emerald City
- Charles W. Smith as The Hottentot, Visitor at the Emerald City
- Daniel Heath as The Buccaneer, Visitor at the Emerald City and as Tertius, an Islander
- Joe Finley as Hans Hoch, Visitor at the Emerald City
- Dudley Burton as A Courtier, Visitor at the Emerald City
- Samuel Woods as Madame Toussaud, Visitor at the Emerald City
- Romola Remus as Dorothy Gale of Kansas
- Maud Harrington and Delilah Leitzel as Princess Ozma of Oz
- Evelyn Judson as Glinda the Good, a Sorceress
- Josephine Brewster as Mombi the Witch
- Geo. Weatherbee as Mons. Grogande, the Baker who made him
- Tommy Dean as Obo, Mifket who likes Gingerbread
- Lillian Swartz as Hogo, Mifket who likes Gingerbread
- Minnie Brown as Joko, Mifket who likes Gingerbread
- Tom Persons as Hopkins, of the Village Fireworks Committee
- Grace Elder as Chick the Cherub, an Incubator Baby
- Annabel Jephson as The Island Princess
- Mrs. Bostwick as Madame Grogand, the Baker's Wife

== Production ==
The New York Times included a write-up of the show in a full-page article in a late 1909 issue, over a year after the show had come and gone, probably because they finally had space for it after it was no longer necessary but still of interest. When the production appeared in New York, the Times' listing for it appeared along with the plays, not with the films, drawing attention to the fact that Baum, not to mention the rest of the cast, would be appearing live on stage with the films as a major, though far from the only, component.

The Fairylogue and Radio-Plays was produced by "The Radio-Play Company of America", John B. Shaw, Jr., general manager. The sets were designed and painted by E. Pollack. The costumes were designed by Fritz Schultz and Chicago Costuming Co. Properties and papier-mâché work by Charles van Duzen. Mechanical effects by Paul Dupont. Wigs by Hepner. Shoes by Marshall Field & Co. Jewels loaned by C.D. Peacock.

The Selig Polyscope Company was involved in the production of the films. This led to erroneous conclusions that The Wonderful Wizard of Oz and its sequels were derived from the materials of this film, which was disproven with the discovery of that film, which bears little resemblance to the surviving materials of Fairylogue. Otis Turner is believed to be the director of both film versions of John Dough and the Cherub, both lost. It may be possible that they were one and the same film, but highly unlikely, as Fairylogue was most likely the singular print eventually discarded by the Baum family after its decomposition.

== See also ==
- List of lost films
