= O'Connor and Goldberg =

O'Connor and Goldberg was a chain of shoe stores in Chicago that operated from the early 1900s through at least the 1970s.

The company operated stores in several shopping districts throughout the area. One of the company's more noteworthy stores was in the Heyworth Building in Chicago's Loop whose elaborate bronze entry was designed by architect Frederick P. Dinkelberg. In addition, the company was a sponsor on the Chicago Cubs radio broadcasts in the 1960s.

Economist Milton Friedman briefly worked at one store in 1932.
