= Popular Mechanics =

American science magazine

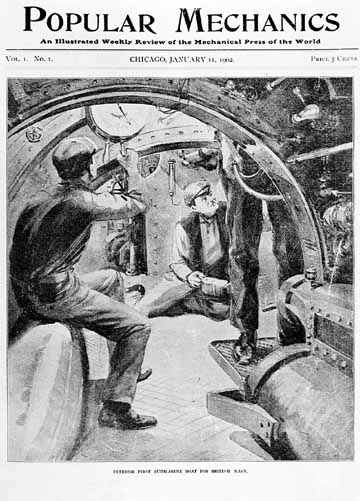
- Popular Mechanics first cover (January 11, 1902)
- Categories: Automotive, DIY, Science, Technology
- Frequency: Six print issues/year
- Circulation: 401,507
- Total circulation: 17.5M 17.9M digital 0.4 print (2024)
- First issue: January 11, 1902; 124 years ago
- Company: Hearst
- Country: United States
- Based in: New York City
- Language: English
- Website: www.popularmechanics.com
- ISSN: 0032-4558

Popular Mechanics (often abbreviated as PM or PopMech) is a magazine of popular science and technology, featuring automotive, home, outdoor, electronics, science, do it yourself, and technology topics. Military topics, aviation and transportation of all types, space, tools and gadgets are commonly featured.

Founded in 1902 by Henry Haven Windsor, the magazine was purchased by Hearst Corporation, now Hearst Communications, in 1958.

Notable people who have contributed articles have included Guglielmo Marconi, Thomas Edison, Pierre Curie, Alexander Graham Bell, Jules Verne, George Dewey, Richard E. Byrd, Babe Ruth, Barney Oldfield, Knute Rockne, Rudyard Kipling, Winston Churchill, Lewis Warrington Chubb, Charles Kettering, Glenn Curtiss, Lee De Forest, Harold Urey, Vannevar Bush, Karl Compton, David Sarnoff, Roy Chapman Andrews, Eddie Rickenbacker, Lowell Thomas, Tom Wolfe, Wilbur Wright, Ted Williams, Edward Teller, and Buzz Aldrin, as well as US presidents such as Teddy Roosevelt and Ronald Reagan. Comedian and car expert Jay Leno had a regular column, Jay Leno's Garage, that started in March 1999. Jamie Hyneman and Adam Savage of Mythbusters had a column.

== History ==
Popular Mechanics was founded as a weekly in Chicago by Henry Haven Windsor, with the first issue dated January 11, 1902. His concept was that it would explain "the way the world works" in plain language, with photos and illustrations to aid comprehension. The first issue was just 16 pages and all articles were written and edited by Windsor himself. There were five initial subscribers and a few hundred were sold on newsstands. It became a monthly 100-page magazine in September. Windsor took advantage of the advent of Rural Free Delivery and used mail carriers to sell subscriptions. By the end of the first year, there were 10,000 subscribers. A year later, there were 32,000 subscriptions.

By 1910, circulation had hit 200,000 and Windsor was a millionaire. In 1923, the company relocated a new building on Ontario Street. It was here that Popular Mechanics added its own printing presses and began to print the magazine in-house. In 1924, Windsor died suddenly and his son, Henry Haven Windsor Jr., took over the business. In January 1952, the magazine released a 500-page 50th anniversary edition. He sold the magazine to Hearst Corporation in 1958. In 1962, the editorial offices moved from Chicago to New York City.

In 1975, Popular Mechanics became a standard format magazine. This ultimately improved ad sales and also its placement on newsstands, increasing sales. Circulation hit its peak in the 1980s, reaching 1.6 million.

In 1991, the company began giving out its annual Design & Engineering Awards to honor technological innovations. The magazine launched its website in 1995.

In 2002, to celebrate the magazine's 100th anniversary, the company released The Best of Popular Mechanics 1902-2002, a special issue featuring the 100 best articles from the publication's history. Popular Mechanics launched an iPad app in 2010.

In January 2019, it was announced that Popular Mechanics would be relocated to Easton, Pennsylvania, along with Bicycling and Runner's World. The magazine's editor-in-chief, Ryan D’Agostino, was also replaced by Alexander George. The move officially took place in 2020. The location has also included Popular Mechanics' testing facility, called the Test Zone.

== Magazine design ==
The first issue featured an illustration of the interior of a submarine. In September 1903, the magazine became a monthly release. It also took on its small 6.5-by-9.5-inch (170 mm × 240 mm) trim size. Color illustrations were first introduced in the February 1910 issue. For decades, its tagline was: "Written so you can understand it."

Early on the magazine was organized into two parts. The front section would cover news and interest pieces, while the back would include tips and hands-on instructions. These tips were eventually consolidated into the Shop Notes column. Windsor also introduced columns for women and children.

In 1915, Popular Mechanics adopted full-color cover illustrations, and the look was widely imitated by later technology magazines.

In 1975, Popular Mechanics switched to a larger 8.5 x 11 standard trim size.

In 2013, the US edition changed from twelve to ten issues per year, and in 2014 the tagline was changed to "How your world works." The magazine added a podcast in recent years, including regular features Most Useful Podcast Ever and How Your World Works.

== International editions ==
During World War II, Popular Mechanics published a foreign edition for soldiers overseas. After the war, a number of international editions were introduced, starting with a French edition. In 1947, a Spanish-language version was started, where it was translated and printed out of Chicago for sale in Latin America. Swedish and Danish version followed in 1949. By 2002, the print magazine was being published in English, Chinese, and Spanish and distributed worldwide.

South African and Russian editions were introduced that same year.

By 2010, Popular Mechanics was being published in 28 languages and distributed in more than 100 countries.

== Editors ==
Editors*
Name	Dates
Henry Haven Windsor	January 1902 – June 1924
Henry Haven Windsor Jr	July 1924 – December 1958
Roderick Grant	January 1959 – December 1960
Clifford Hicks	January 1961 – September 1962
Don Dinwiddie	October 1962 – September 1965
Robert Crossley	July 1966 – December 1971
Jim Liston	January 1972 – December 1974
John Linkletter	January 1975 – June 1985
Joe Oldham	August 1985 – September 2004
Jim Meigs	October 2004 – April 2014
Ryan D'Agostino	May 2014 – March 2019
Alexander George	March 2019 – April 2021
Bill Strickland	April 2021 – Present

*In general, dates are the inclusive issues for which an editor was responsible. For decades, the lead time to go from submission to print was three months, so some of the dates might not correspond exactly with employment dates. As the Popular Mechanics web site has become more dominant and the importance of print issues has declined, editorial changes have more immediate impact.

== Awards ==
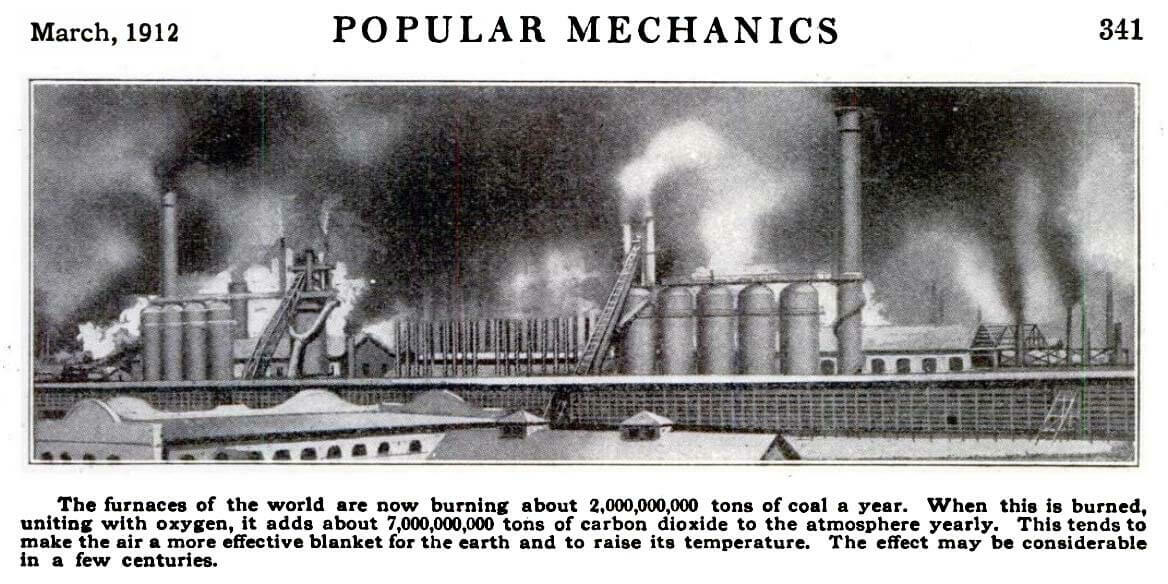
The impact of the greenhouse effect on Earth's climate was succinctly described more than a century ago in this 1912 Popular Mechanics article.

=== National Magazine Awards ===
- 1986 National Magazine Award in the Leisure Interest category for the Popular Mechanics Woodworking Guide, November 1986.
- 2008 National Magazine Award in the Personal Service category for its "Know Your Footprint: Energy, Water and Waste" series, as well as nominations for General Excellence and Personal Service (a second nomination).
- 2011 National Magazine Award nomination for "General Excellence" in the "Finance, Technology and Lifestyle magazines" category.
- 2016 National Magazine Award Finalist in "Personal Service" category for "How to Buy a Car" and "Magazine Section" category for "How Your World Works."
- 2017 National Magazine Award nomination in the "Magazine Section" category for "Know-How" and in "Feature Writing" for "Climb Aboard, Ye Who Seek the Truth."
- All together, the magazine has received 10 National Magazine Award nominations, including 2012 nominations in the Magazine of the Year category and the General Excellence category and a 2015 finalist in both categories.

=== Other awards ===
- 2011 Stater Bros Route 66 Cruisin’ Hall of Fame inductee in "Entertainment/Media" category.
- 2016 Ad Age "Magazine of the Year."
- 2017 Webby Awards Honoree for "How to Fix Flying" in the category of "Best Individual Editorial Experience (websites and mobile sites.)"
- 2019 Defence Media Awards Finalist in "Best Training, Simulation and Readiness" category for "The Air Force Is Changing How Special Ops Fighters Are Trained"
- 2021 American Nuclear Society "Darlene Schmidt Science News Award" to contributor Caroline Delbert for her "passion and interest in all things nuclear and radiation."
- 2022 Aerospace Media Awards finalist in the category "Best Propulsion" for "The Space Shuttle Engines Will Rise Again" by Joe Pappalardo.

== Media ==
=== Books ===
A book division was established in 1904. Over the years, it has published books, guides, encyclopedias, as well as various annuals and special titles. It has also released The Boy Mechanic books, a series of children's books that repackages articles from older issues of Popular Mechanics.

=== Television ===
In 1947, Popular Mechanics produced a television special called Mr. Fix-It Earns a Holiday. It was broadcast live from WBKB in Chicago.

From 1997 to 2000, Popular Mechanics for Kids aired on Global TV, which broke down scientific topics for children. It started Jay Baruchel, Elisha Cuthbert, and Tyler Kyte.

=== Podcasts ===
Popular Mechanics maintains a podcast called 'The Most Useful Podcast Ever'. It also previously had 'How Your World Works'.

== In popular culture ==
The March 1962 issue of Popular Mechanics magazine aided in the June 1962 Alcatraz escape attempt, in which three men (Frank Morris and John and Clarence Anglin) used the magazine as a reference to build life vests and a raft out of rubber raincoats and contact cement.

In 1999, the magazine was a puzzle on Wheel of Fortune. In April 2001, Popular Mechanics was the first magazine to go to space, traveling to the International Space Station aboard the Soyuz TM-32 spacecraft. In December 2002, an issue featured the cover story and image of "The Real Face of Jesus" using data from forensic anthropologists and computer programmers.

In March 2005, Popular Mechanics released an issue dedicated to debunking 9/11 conspiracy theories, which has been used frequently for discrediting 9/11 "trutherism." In 2006, the magazine published a book based on that article entitled "Debunking 9/11 Myths: Why Conspiracy Theories Can't Stand Up to the Facts," with a foreword by then-senator John McCain.

An October 2015 issue of Popular Mechanics, featuring director Ridley Scott, included an interactive cover that unlocked special content about Scott's film The Martian. In June 2016, the magazine ran a cover story with then-Vice President of the United States Joe Biden called "Things My Father Taught Me" for its fatherhood issue. Apple Inc. CEO Tim Cook guest-edited the September/October 2022 of Popular Mechanics.

The magazine is mentioned in the 2013 film The Wolf of Wall Street.

The name of the magazine is mentioned in the song 'Big Fan of the Pigpen' from the Guided by Voices album Bee Thousand.

== Criticisms ==
In June 2020, following several high-profile takedowns of statues of controversial historical figures, Popular Mechanics faced criticism from primarily conservative commentators and news outlets for an article that provided detailed instructions on how to take down statues.

In early December 2020, Popular Mechanics published an article titled "Leaked Government Photo Shows 'Motionless, Cube-Shaped' UFO". In late December, later that month, paranormal claims investigator and fellow of the Committee for Skeptical Inquiry (CSI), Kenny Biddle, investigated the claim in Skeptical Inquirer, reporting that he and investigator and CSI fellow Mick West identified the supposed UFO as a mylar Batman balloon.

== Bibliography ==
- Israel, Paul B. (April 1994). "Enthusiasts and Innovators: 'Possible Dreams' and the 'Innovation Station' at the Henry Ford Museum". Technology and Culture. 35 (2): 396–401. doi:10.2307/3106308. JSTOR 3106308. S2CID 112116916.
- Wright, John L. (July 1992). Possible Dreams: Enthusiasm for Technology in America. Henry Ford Museum and Greenfield Village. p. 128. ISBN 978-0-933728-35-6.
- Bryant, Margaret M. (1977). "New Words from Popular Mechanics". American Speech. 52 (1/2): 39–46. doi:10.2307/454718. JSTOR 454718.
- A nearly complete archive of Popular Mechanics issues from 1905 through 2005 is available through Google Books.
- Popular Mechanics' cover art is the subject of Tom Burns' 2015 Texas Tech PhD dissertation, titled Useful fictions: How Popular Mechanics builds technological literacy through magazine cover illustration.
- Orf, Darren (2013). ""Written So You Can Understand It": The process and people behind creating an issue of Popular Mechanics". University of Missouri—Columbia. "Darren Orr wrote an analysis of the state of Popular Mechanics in 2014 as partial fulfillment of requirements for a master's degree in journalism from University of Missouri-Columbia."
