= Franklin Dodge =

FBI agent

Franklin L. Dodge
- Photo from Dodge's DOJ application in 1923.
- Born: July 29, 1891; Lansing, Michigan
- Died: November 26, 1968 (aged 77)

Franklin L. Dodge, Jr. (July 29, 1891 – November 26, 1968) was a Bureau of Investigation agent in the early 1920s who had an affair with Imogene Remus, the wife of millionaire bootlegger George Remus.

== Early life ==
Franklin L. Dodge, Jr. was born in Lansing, Michigan in 1891. His father, Franklin L. Dodge, Sr. was a prominent lawyer and businessman who served two terms as a representative in the Michigan State Legislature and made several unsuccessful bids for higher office as a Democrat.

== Career in the Bureau of Investigation ==
During a background investigation, U.S. District Judge Arthur J. Tuttle described Dodge as honest and capable but warned about his "energy and discretion." Dodge was appointed a special agent of the Bureau of Investigation, the predecessor of the FBI, in April 1920, and by later that year, he was in charge of the BOI's office in Grand Rapids, Michigan.

While an agent, Dodge participated in the investigation of the "Big Four", a Savannah-based bootlegging organization led by Willie Haar, whose members were subsequently convicted. Bureau Director William J. Burns credited Dodge with producing many of the investigation's successful results.

== Internal investigation and resignation ==
In 1925, the Bureau of Investigation opened an inquiry into Dodge's conduct. The summary included allegations of misconduct related to alcohol.

In March 1926, Representative Fiorello La Guardia accused Dodge on the floor of the U.S. House of Representatives of attempting to sell approximately $200,000 worth of liquor permits belonging to George Remus. La Guardia, an anti-Prohibitionist, alleged that Dodge had used the name John Gray in connection with the attempted sale and cited the case as an example of corruption in federal Prohibition enforcement.

The investigation also examined Dodge's other conduct involving women, including allegations concerning the Hollenden Hotel in Cleveland, Ohio, which the reviewer said were corroborated by statements from several hotel employees and another agent. The reviewer further raised the possibility of a violation of the White Slave Traffic Act, commonly known as the Mann Act, after two agents reportedly overheard Dodge inviting a woman in Detroit to Cleveland.

With the investigation concluding that Dodge had committed significant misconduct, he submitted his resignation on June 11, 1925.

== Affair with Imogene Remus ==
In the course of his law enforcement work, he met George Remus, a millionaire bootlegger from Cincinnati who had entered the Atlanta Federal Prison in 1924. Dodge became romantically involved with Remus's wife, Imogene, while Remus was imprisoned.

Dodge convinced Imogene to begin liquidating her husband's assets and hide as much money as possible. They also sold Remus's huge Fleischmann distillery, and gave Remus only $100 of the enterprise he created. To protect themselves, they then tried to have Remus deported. When that failed, they paid a hitman $15,000 to kill Remus, which also failed.

In October 1927, six months after he was released from prison, Remus shot Imogene to death in broad daylight in a Cincinnati park. During the murder trial, Remus successfully defended himself by pleading insanity and was acquitted.

== Later life ==
In November 1930, Dodge was arrested in Lansing, Michigan, on a federal warrant charging perjury in connection with a bootlegging case. He was sentenced to 30 months in Atlanta Federal Penitentiary.

Dodge lived the rest of his life in Michigan, where he worked for the Michigan Liquor Control Commission after the end of Prohibition. He eventually married. He died in 1968 and is buried in Lansing, Michigan.

== Sources ==
- Brown, Dorothy M. Mabel Walker Willebrandt: A Study of Power, Loyalty, and Law. Knoxville, TN: University of Tennessee Press, 1984.
- Congressional Record-House, March 24, 1926: 6174-76; July 3, 1926: 13012-15.
- Rosenberg, Albert and Cindy Armstrong, The American Gladiators: Taft Versus Remus. Hemet, CA: Aimwell Press, 1995.
