= C.D. Peacock =

American retail jewelry store

CD Peacock
- Industry: Retail
- Founded: 1837; 189 years ago
- Headquarters: Chicago, Illinois, United States
- Products: Jewelry
- Owner: Seymour Holtzman
- Website: cdpeacock.com

CD Peacock, originally established as The House of Peacock, is a Chicago-based retail jewelry store founded in 1837 by Elijah Peacock. The company is Chicago's oldest existing retailer.

== History ==
The company survived the Great Chicago Fire, despite its location in the middle of the city, as all of its merchandise was kept in a fireproof safe. In 1889, Charles Daniel Peacock Sr. assumed control of the business and changed the name to the current C.D. Peacock. They issued their first retail catalog in 1893, which coincided with the World's Columbian Exposition. Later, company president Walter C. Peacock became an important figure in Chicago and Illinois sporting circles.

The Peacock family sold the company to Dayton-Hudson in 1969. During the 1992 American recession, the company encountered financial difficulty, entered bankruptcy and was sold to Gordon Brothers, but ultimately survived in a greatly reduced form. As of 1993, C.D. Peacock is owned by Seymour Holtzman, Chairman of Destination XL Group, with three Metro-Chicago locations. As of 2023 C. D. Peacock still belongs to a corporation controlled by the Holtzman family.

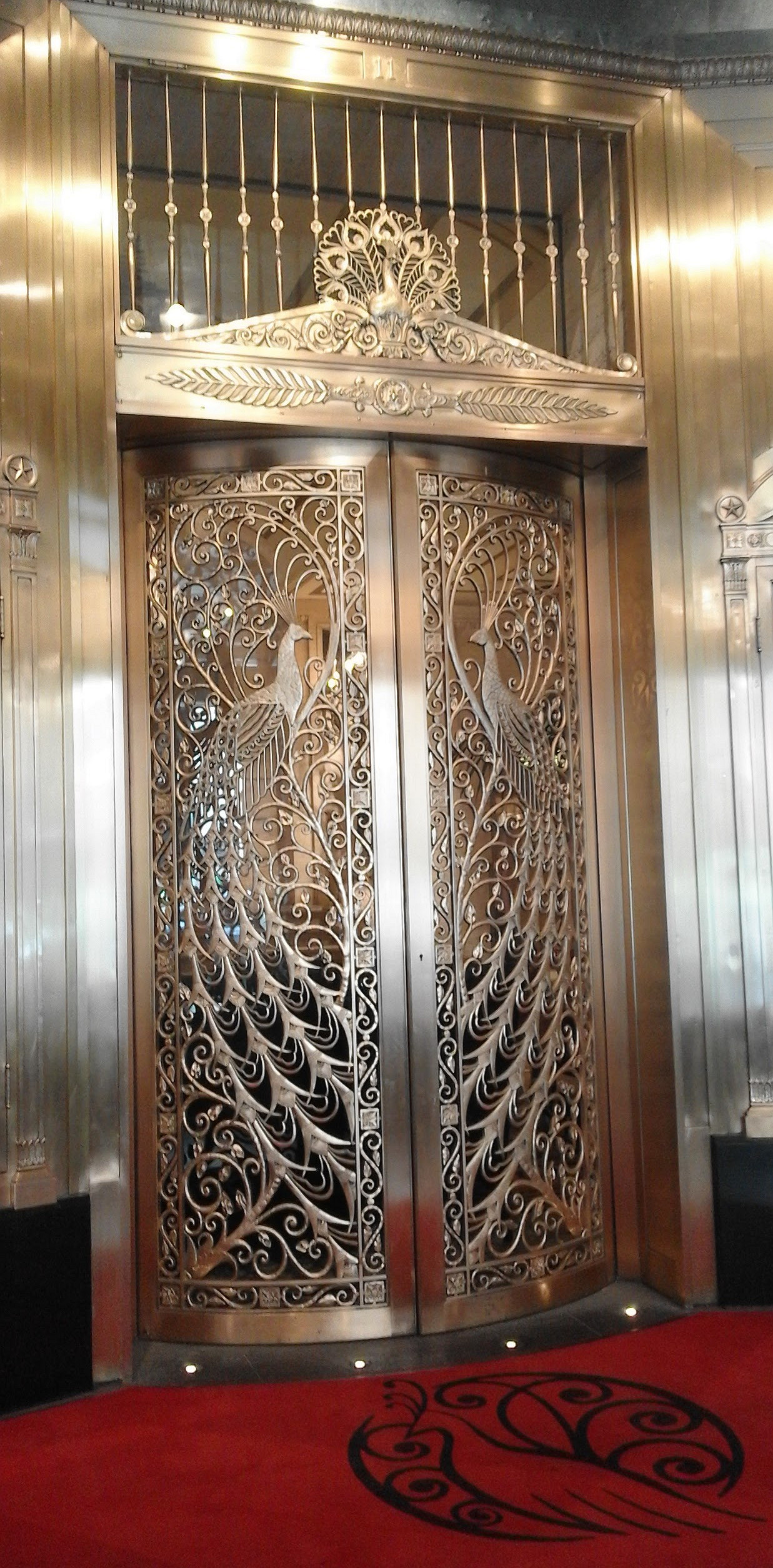

The location in The Palmer House Hilton is known for its 3 openwork brass Art Nouveau "peacock doors" designed by Louis Comfort Tiffany. (They are unrelated to The Peacock Room.)
