= Bullfrog =

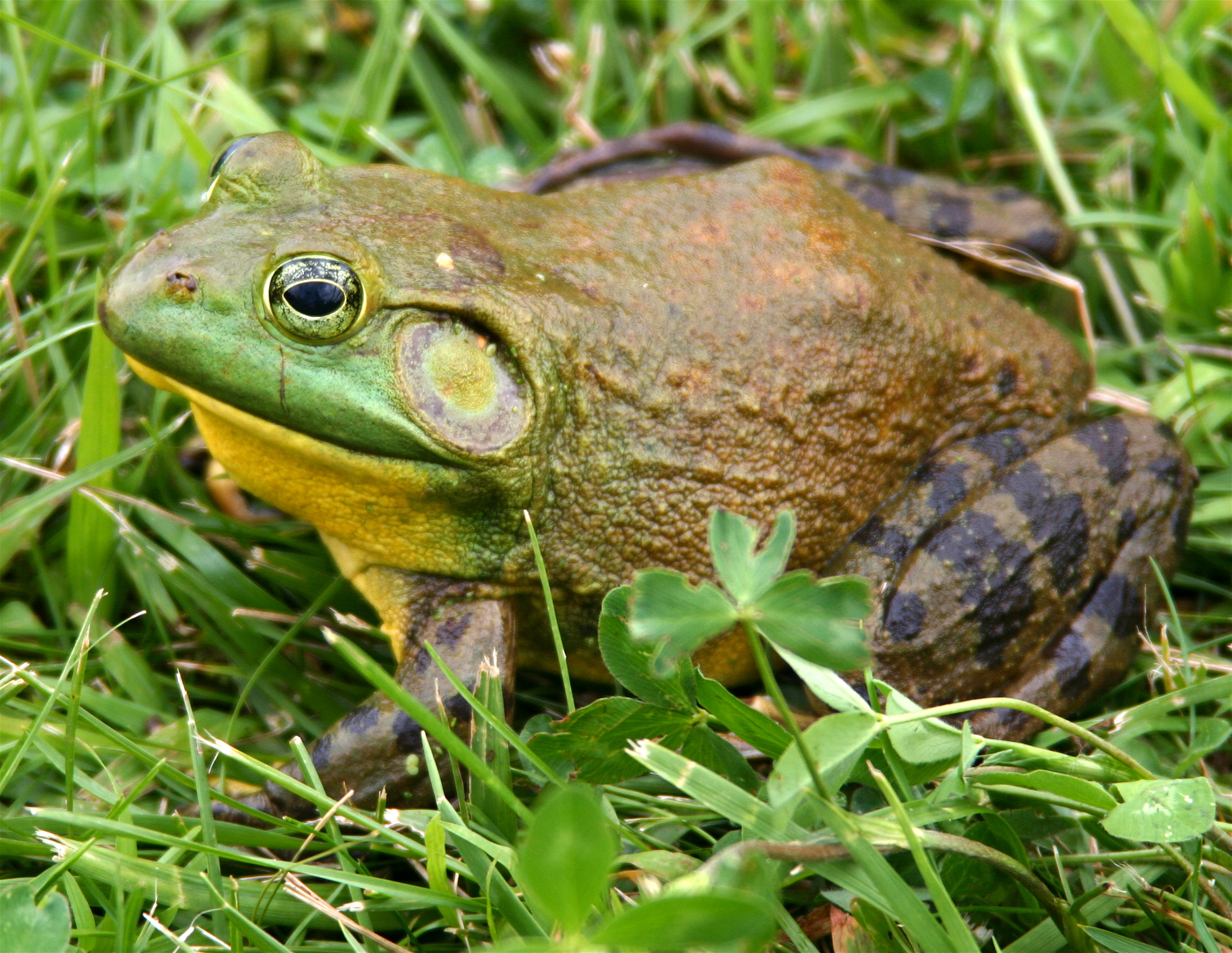
North American bullfrog

Bullfrog is a common English language term to refer to large, aggressive frogs, regardless of species.

Examples of bullfrogs include:

== Frog species ==
=== Americas ===
- Helmeted water toad (Calyptocephalella gayi), endemic to Chile
- American bullfrog (Lithobates catesbeianus), indigenous to North America
- Cane toad (Rhinella marina), a toad indigenous to Central and South America, called "bullfrog" in the Philippines

=== Australia ===
- Limnodynastes dorsalis, found in Southwest Australia
- Limnodynastes dumerilii, found in Eastern Australia
- Giant banjo frog (Limnodynastes interioris), found in Eastern Australia

=== Africa ===
- African bullfrog (Pyxicephalus adspersus), found in central and southern Africa
- Calabresi's bullfrog (Pyxicephalus obbianus), found in Somalia
- Crowned bullfrog (Hoplobatrachus occipitalis), found in much of Africa
- Edible bullfrog (Pyxicephalus edulis), found in much of Africa

=== Asia ===
- Banded bullfrog (Kaloula pulchra), found in Southeast Asia
- Chinese edible frog (Hoplobatrachus rugulosus) or East Asian Bullfrog, found in China and Southeast Asia
- Hoplobatrachus crassus or Jerdon's bullfrog, found in India
- Hoplobatrachus tigerinus or Indus Valley bullfrog, found in Pakistan and North India

== See also ==
- Bullfrog (disambiguation)
- Frog (disambiguation)
- Cane toads (disambiguation)
- Toad (disambiguation)
