= Bullfrog (disambiguation) =

Bullfrog is a large aggressive frog, of any of a number of species.

Bullfrog may also refer to:

== Places ==
- Bullfrog, Nevada, a ghost town
- Bullfrog, Utah, a small community
- Bullfrog Basin Airport, Utah
- Bullfrog County, Nevada, a short-lived county in Nevada
- Bullfrog Hills, a mountain range in Nevada
- Bullfrog Marina, in Utah

== Companies ==
- Bullfrog Climax Group, a UK video game-development company later called Climax Group
- Bullfrog International, spa manufacturer
- Bullfrog Power, a renewable energy company in Canada
- Bullfrog Productions, a UK computer game developer

== Music ==
- Green Bullfrog, a 1972 album produced by Derek Lawrence
- Bullfrogs and Butterflies (album), a 1978 album produced by Mike Deasy and features Barry McGuire and Candle
- "The Bullfrog", a 1991 single by GTO
- "Bullfrog", a song from Alligator Bites Never Heal by Doechii
- "Bullfrog", a song from Skinny Dipping by Stand Atlantic

== Sports ==
- Anaheim Bullfrogs, an inline hockey team
- Green Bay Bullfrogs, a baseball team
- Raleigh Bullfrogs, a former basketball team
- Yuma Bullfrogs, a former minor league baseball team
- Peter "Bullfrog" Moore (1932–2000), former chief executive of the Canterbury Bulldogs Rugby League

== See also ==
- Bullfrog Road Bridge, a historic bridge near Taneytown, Frederick County, Maryland, United States
- Bullfrog Goldfield Railroad, a railroad that operated in Nevada 1905–1928; see List of Nevada railroads
