= The Magical Monarch of Mo =

1899 novel by L. Frank Baum

The Surprising Adventures of the Magical Monarch of Mo and His People (copyright registered June 17, 1896) is the first full-length children's fantasy novel by L. Frank Baum. Originally published in 1899 as A New Wonderland, Being the First Account Ever Printed of the Beautiful Valley, and the Wonderful Adventures of Its Inhabitants, the book was reissued in 1903 with a new title in order to capitalize upon the alliterative title of Baum's successful The Wonderful Wizard of Oz. The book is only slightly altered—Mo is called Phunniland or Phunnyland, but aside from the last paragraph of the first chapter, they are essentially the same book. It is illustrated by Frank Ver Beck.

== Setting ==
Mo
- The Oz series location
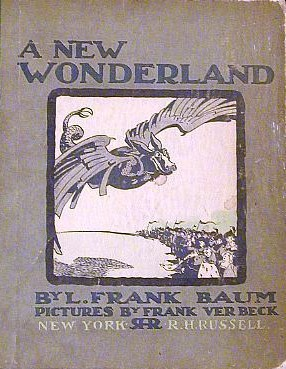
- First edition cover
- Created by: L. Frank Baum
- Genre: Children's fantasy

In-universe information
- Other names: Beautiful Valley of Mo, Phunnyland
- Type: Fairy country
- Ruled by: King of Mo
- Ethnic group: Momen
- Location: Nonestica
- Locations: Milk River, Rootbeer River
- Characters: Prince Zingle, Prince Thinkabit, Prince Jollikin, Prince Fiddlecumdoo, Princess Pattycake, Princess Truella, The Purple Dragon, "Prince" the dog, the Wise Donkey, Maëtta

The Land of Mo occupies a magical valley across a desert from the Land of Oz. It is a sort of candyland, with many edible features in its landscape. It is adjacent to the land of the wicked King Scowleyow, and to a valley controlled by the giant Hartilaf. It is ruled by a royal family like those in European fairy tales, but they use modern inventions such as telephones, electric lights, bicycles, and chewing gum. The people are immortal and cannot be killed.

The Land of Mo is also mentioned in The Life and Adventures of Santa Claus (as Phunniland), as well as in The Patchwork Girl of Oz, and appears in The Scarecrow of Oz.

== Plot summary ==
Chapter One: This chapter is plotless, serving more as a basic description of the Land of Mo, or "The Beautiful Valley". It explains that everyone in Mo is happy, and that the people never need to work, because everything they could desire grows on the trees, including items such as clothes. Nobody ages and the King and Queen of Mo have a lot of children. In A New Wonderland, the author mentions planning to move there himself, but this was omitted from subsequent editions.

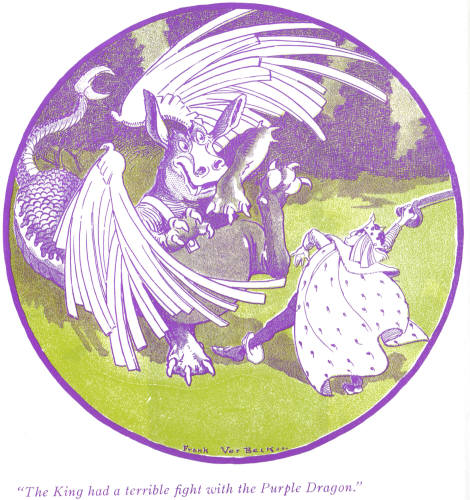
King Mo fights the Purple Dragon

Chapter Two: The King of Mo goes to fight the Purple Dragon, which has just eaten all of the caramels in the land. The Purple Dragon bites off his head and the King is forced to go home headless. The King tries to make the best of it, but the Queen complains that she cannot kiss him anymore, so he issues an edict saying that whoever can make him a new head will get to marry one of the princesses. After two failures, a durable head is made out of wood by a wood-chopper. The Purple Dragon finds the wood-chopper and bites his head off, replacing it with the King's head. When the wood-chopper appears in court, he switches heads with the King, so that the King has his own head again and the wood-chopper has a wooden head he made. The King then tries to fulfill his promise, but the princesses refuse to marry a wooden-headed man. The wood-chopper then confronts the Purple Dragon, who tries its head-biting technique again, only to get its teeth stuck in the wooden head, thus letting the wood-chopper get his own head back so he can marry a princess.

Chapter Three: The Monarch meets a dog who is a curiosity because there are no dogs in Mo. However, his majesty loses his temper and ends up kicking the dog who literally gets bent out of shape until he resumes his natural form again.

Chapter Four: Prince Zingle, the oldest Prince, is upset because the King will not let him milk the Ice Cream Cow. Urged by the Purple Dragon, Zingle pushes his father down a large hole so he will become the King. The Monarch escapes from the hole and punishes Zingle by abandoning him on the Fruit Cake Island on the Root Beer River, an island made of fruit cake. After a while, Prince Zingle gets such a furious stomachache from eating nothing but fruit cake that he repents.

Chapter Five: The King celebrates his birthday (which he does several times a year) by throwing a huge celebration, during which he entertains everyone with items from a magical casket. Everyone goes ice-skating on a lake of sugar-syrup. The sugar-syrup cracks and Princess Truella, Prince Jollikin, and Nuphsed sink to the bottom. The King gets them out by fishing for them, baiting the line with a kiss for Truella and a laugh for Jollikin. But when it comes to getting Nuphsed, no one knows what he likes best, so they consult the Wise Donkey. The Wise Donkey suggests that they use an apple, knowing that it will not work. When it does not work, the Wise Donkey eats the apple and tells them to use a kind word. They do, and it works.

Chapter Six: King Scowleyow, who lives in a nearby country, hates the people of Mo, and has his people build a giant man out of cast iron, designed to destroy Mo. They wind up the Cast-Iron Man and he walks towards Mo, but trips on the dog. Prince Thinkabit figures out how to get rid of the Cast-Iron Man: he tickles the Cast-Iron Man to get him on his back, then he pushes a pin in the Cast-Iron Man to get him to stand up again, but now the Cast-Iron Man is facing the other way, so he goes to King Scowleyow's kingdom and destroys it instead. The Cast-Iron Man eventually gets stuck in the mud at the bottom of the ocean and is never heard from again.

Chapter Seven: A boy named Timtom falls in love with Princess Pattycake, the most beautiful princess, who unfortunately has a bad temper and tries to beat anyone who talks to her. He journeys to see the Sorceress Maëtta to get her help, and along the way, he meets a bird, a rabbit, and a spider who agree to help him in return for gifts from Maëtta. Timtom gets a pill for getting rid of Pattycake's temper and the gifts for the animals, but they are stolen by a Sly Fox. Timtom manages to recover the gifts, thus pleasing the animals. He then goes to Pattycake and feeds her the pill. She loses her temper and then agrees to marry him.

Chapter Eight: A horrible monster called a Gigaboo comes to Mo and starts destroying things. Prince Jollikin fights the Gigaboo, and has his head, arms and legs cut off. Prince Jollikin manages to put himself back together, although at first he could only find his legs and head. He then saves the day by killing the Gigaboo.

Chapter Nine: There is an evil wizard in Mo who is a midget and very sensitive about his height, so he tries to make a potion to increase his height. One of the ingredients of the potion is the big toe of a princess, so he steals the toe from Princess Truella. Truella gives chase, overcoming the obstacles the Wizard throws at her, and eventually kills the Wizard and recovers her toe.

Chapter Ten: The Duchess Bredenbutta falls asleep on her boat while it floats down the Root Beer River, and so she gets too close to the waterfall at the end of the river and falls down. She ends up in Turvyland, where everything is opposite of the way it should be. With some help from a local named Upsydoun, she manages to get back to her home.

Chapter Eleven: The King's animal crackers, which are real animals, fight amongst each other, putting the King in a bad mood. So when Prince Fiddlecumdoo asks to leave Mo, the King consents, although it is a bad idea. Prince Fiddlecumdoo leaves and meets a friendly giant named Hartilaf. Hartilaf's wife accidentally runs the prince through a clothes-wringer and Prince Fiddlecumdoo returns home, completely flat. They use an air pump to get him back to normal.

Chapter Twelve: This chapter anticipates the novel Planet of the Apes by more than sixty years. Prince Zingle builds a large kite, which flies into the air, taking Zingle with it, eventually landing in the Land of the Civilized Monkeys, where monkeys act like humans. The monkeys do not speak English (but rather, they speak Monkey) and have never seen a human before. So they think Zingle is a dangerous animal and lock him in the zoo, where all of the monkeys come to see him, including two professors who believe that Zingle may be the missing link. Prince Zingle manages to escape and get back home.

Chapter Thirteen: The King's plum-pudding has been stolen, so he asks his wise men who did it. The wise men blame the fox, who is captured. The fox explains that he did not do it, as he was busy curing his family's sore throats by taking out the throats and turning them inside-out, then drying them in the sun. The wise men then blame the bullfrog, who is also captured. The bullfrog explains that he did not do it, as he and his wife were busy trying to save their tadpoles, who were eaten by a large fish. The wise men then blame the Yellow Hen, who is also captured. She explains that she did not do it, as her last batch of eggs accidentally produced a Hawk, not a chicken, and the Hawk took her away to a different country, and she spent the last nine days returning to Mo. The King, furious at the wise men for being wrong three times, has them put into a meat-grinder, so that they are mixed into one wise man, who tells the King that the Purple Dragon stole the plum-pudding.

Chapter Fourteen: The King holds a council of war to figure out how to destroy the Purple Dragon once and for all. They decide that, since the Purple Dragon cannot be killed, they can try to rip out its teeth to make it harmless. They build a giant pair of forceps and clamp it to one of the Purple Dragon's teeth, but it winds its tail around a pillar to stop the people from pulling his tooth out. As it turns out, its tooth cannot be removed, even though the people run all the way to the other side of the valley with the forceps. Instead, the Purple Dragon is stretched all the way across the valley; it is stretched so thin that it's "no larger around than a piece of twine". Prince Fiddlecumdoo decides to cut the dragon into strings, some of which he decides to use for his violin, while he stores the rest in the royal warehouse for anyone to take and use. Though it is technically still alive, the Purple Dragon is now nothing more than two pieces of matter: "one tied to a tree in the mountains and the other fastened to a post of the castle". With the Purple Dragon gone, the King gives a feast to his people to celebrate the end of its reign of terror on their land.

== Characters ==
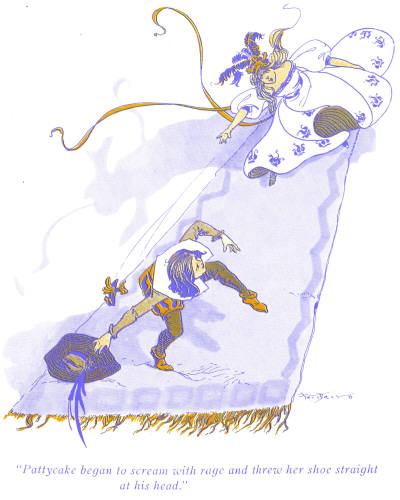
Princess Pattycake lobs a shoe at Prince Timtom

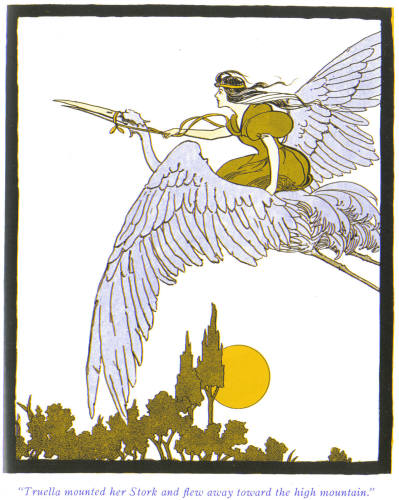
Princess Truella rides a stork to the high mountains

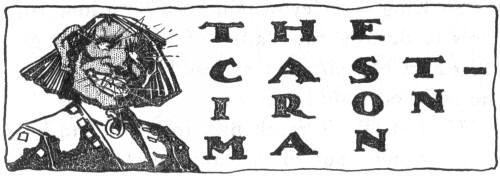
The Cast Iron Man, as illustrated by Frank Ver Beck

- The Monarch of Mo: The unnamed titular character and main protagonist. He's the king of the Valley of Mo, and rarely unhappy. He tries his best to make everyone as happy as possible.
- The Queen: The unnamed queen of the Valley of Mo and the Monarch's wife. She rarely appears, but when she does, she acts more like a typical wife/mother than a typical queen.
- Prince Zingle: The oldest prince, who, tempted by the Purple Dragon, tries to kill the Monarch in order to gain the crown, but fails, is banished to Fruit Cake Island, and later repents. His name is a play on "single", because he was left single on an island. Later on, he accidentally reaches the Land of the Civilized Monkeys, where he is put in a zoo, but manages to escape and return home.
- Prince Thinkabit: The smartest of the princes, who is sometimes called upon to figure out solutions to problems.
- Prince Jollikin: He is the most playful of the princes, as evidenced by his name, which is based on the word "Jolly". He fights the Gigaboo and loses, but when he tries to fight the Gigaboo a second time, he wins and saves Mo from destruction.
- Prince Fiddlecumdoo: The youngest prince, who is somewhat spoiled. He plays the fiddle very well, and visits the giant Hartilaf, whose wife accidentally crushes him flat.
- (Prince) Timtom: Timtom falls in love with the Princess Pattycake, and undergoes several dangers in order to cure her of her bad temper. He succeeds and then they get married, and he becomes a Prince.
- Princess Pattycake: She is the most beautiful of the King's daughters, but has a bad temper and tries to hurt anyone who talks to her. Timtom manages to cure her, and she then agrees to marry him.
- Princess Truella: Her big toe is stolen by the Wizard, and she undergoes many hardships in order to get it back.
- The Wood-chopper: He builds a head out of wood for the King when the Purple Dragon steals the King's head, and after some misadventures with the Purple Dragon, restores his and the King's head to their proper bodies.
- The Purple Dragon: The overarching antagonist of the book and the Monarch of Mo's arch-nemesis. It's a purple-scaled dragon that terrorizes the Valley of Mo and its people, from eating the people's food to biting off their king's head.
- The Dog: The only dog in Mo. At first he is "something of a wag", but later on becomes a respected person in Mo, and even saves Mo from the Cast-iron Man, although accidentally. His name is "Prince."
- The Wise Donkey: A donkey who ate all the books in Mo, so he absorbed all the knowledge in them and is the smartest person in Mo. The King sometimes consults the Wise Donkey when he wants help, and the Wise Donkey usually helps him (sometimes the Wise Donkey acts in its own interest, not the King's). The Wise Donkey reports in The Patchwork Girl of Oz that he became stranded in Oz when he came to visit on the very day that Glinda cut it off from the rest of the world.
- Nuphsed: The Monarchs's chamberlain, who gets no lines whatsoever.
- Wicked King Scowleyow: A tyrannical king of an unnamed kingdom that is north of Mo. He builds the Cast-iron Man in an attempt to destroy Mo because he is jealous of how happy they are.
- The Cast-Iron Man: A robotic creature built by Scowleyow to destroy the Mo people. It trips on the dog, and thanks to Prince Thinkabit, the Mo people manage to get rid of the Cast-iron man by turning it around and setting it to destroy Scowleyow's kingdom instead. Unable to stop, the creature marches all the way to the sea, where it sinks to the bottom and is stuck there indefinitely.
- The Sorceress Maëtta: A good sorceress who helps Timtom and Truella when they ask for her help.
- Rabbit: The rabbit lives outside of Maëtt's palace and digs a tunnel leading inside the palace for Timtom, in exchange for a new tail. When Timtom cannot give the rabbit a new tail, it lets Timtom pass anyway.
- Spider: The spider builds a web that forms a bridge over the river of needles, so that Timtom can cross it, in exchange for a new eye.
- Bird: A bird flies Timtom over a gulf in exchange for a song.
- Sly Fox: The Sly Fox steals the presents that Timtom receives from Maëtta, but finds no use for them.
- Gigaboo: A fearsome creature that lives in the Land of Mo. Its body was round with a thick shell (like a turtle's shell), its head was supported by a long goose-like neck, it had four mouths, seven bright and glittering eyes (each colored red, green, yellow, blue, black, purple, and crimson), ten short thick legs, and two arms with claws like a lobster that were strong enough to pinch a tree in two. Prince Jollikin kills it.
- The Wizard: The Wizard is a midget magic-user steals Truella's toe to use in a potion to increase his size. Truella defeats him and gets her toe back.
- Duchess Bredenbutta: The 47th cousin of the King of Mo and great-grandniece of the Queen of Mo, who accidentally goes to Turvyland, where everything is the opposite of how it should be.
- Upsydoun: A resident of Turvyland, who invites the Duchess to dinner and helps her return home.
- Hartilaf: A giant who lives in the valley next to Mo. Hartilaf is so big that he can make a journey to Alaska and South America and be back by sundown. He likes to play jokes and have fun.
- Hartilaf's Wife: A giantess who married Hartilaf. She is more responsible than he is, although she accidentally runs Prince Fiddlecumdoo through a clothes-wringer.
- Monkeys: The monkeys live in the Land of Civilized Monkeys, and therefore are civilized (they wear fancy clothes and have a well-structured society and so on). They do not know about humans. When they meet Prince Zingle, they think he is an animal and put him in the zoo.
- The Wise Men: The King's three wise men are rather stupid and ridiculous, so they are not very helpful. The King eventually puts the three of them together to form one wise man.
- The Wise Man: The wise man, made up from parts of the three wise men, is wise and able to help the King, unlike the wise men.
- The Yellow Hen: The wise men falsely accuse of stealing the King's plum-pudding, when she was not even in Mo at the time of the crime. She raises a baby hawk along with her babies, not knowing that it is a hawk until it tries to kill her.
- The Fox: The wise men falsely accuse him of stealing the King's plum-pudding, when he and his family was throatless at the time.
- Dr. Prairiedog: Dr. Prairiedog tells the Fox how to cure a sore throat.
- The Bullfrog: The wise men falsely accuse him of stealing the King's plum-pudding, when he was fishing at the time, for his tadpoles were stuck in the fish.
- Bumpy Man: Introduced in The Scarecrow of Oz, the Bumpy Man is a rugged-looking man with bumps all over him. He is also called the Mountain Ear because it is his duty to listen to the world around him and tell the mountain on which he lives about what is going on. Thus, it keeps the mountain from shaking, rumbling, and spouting. He sleeps little since he stays alert at night listening for the slightest sound.
