= Sky Island =

1912 novel by L. Frank Baum

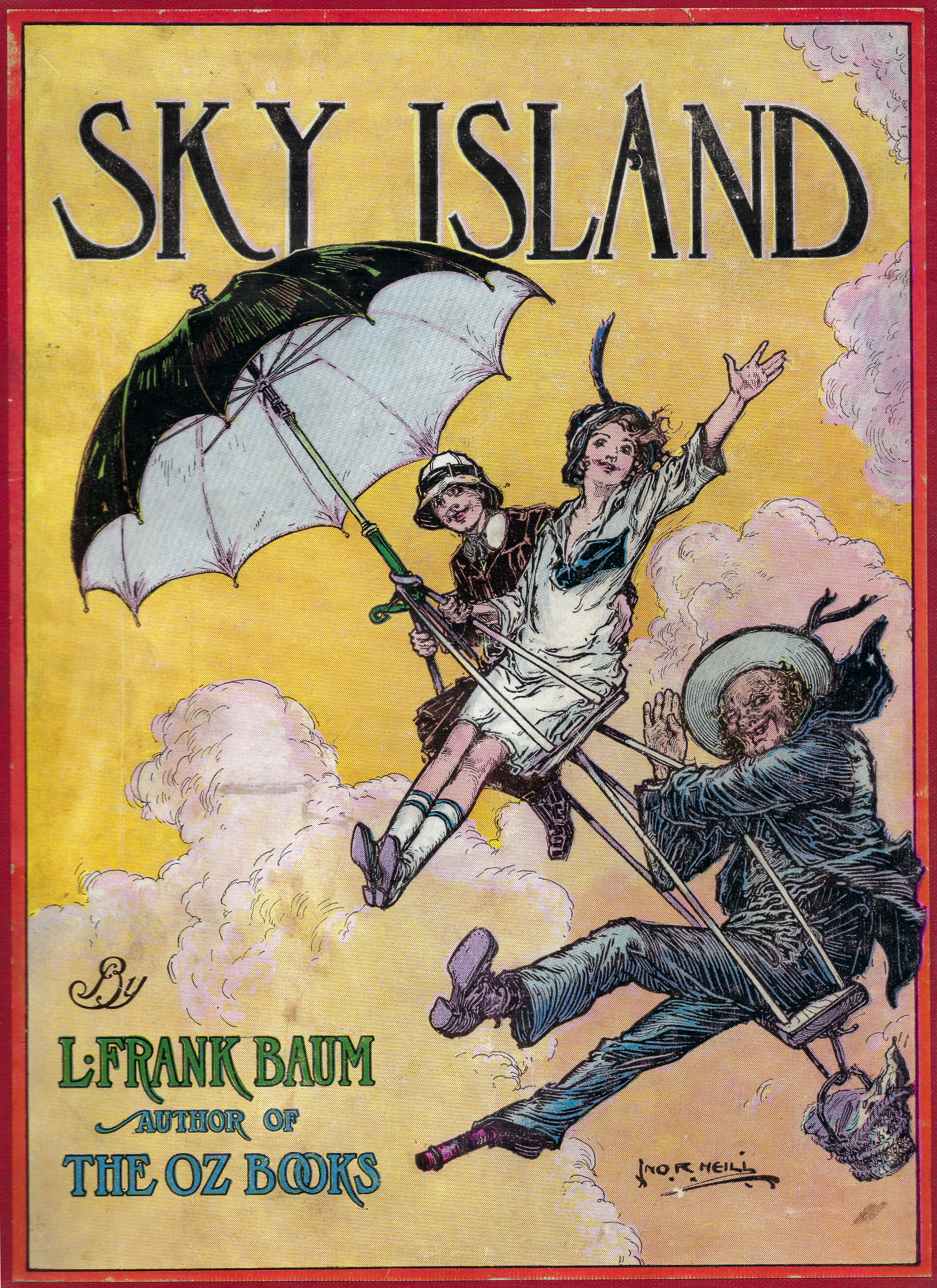
- First edition
- Author: L. Frank Baum
- Illustrator: John R. Neill
- Language: English
- Genre: Children's novel
- Publisher: Reilly & Britton
- Publication date: 1912
- Publication place: United States
- Media type: Print (hardcover)
- Pages: 288 pp.
- Preceded by: The Sea Fairies
- Followed by: The Scarecrow of Oz

Sky Island: Being the Further Adventures of Trot and Cap'n Bill after Their Visit to the Sea Fairies is a children's fantasy novel written by L. Frank Baum, illustrated by John R. Neill, and published in 1912 by the Reilly & Britton Company—the same constellation of forces that produced the Oz books in the first decades of the twentieth century.

As the full title indicates, Sky Island is a sequel to Baum's The Sea Fairies of 1911. Both books were intended as parts of a projected long-running fantasy series to replace the Oz books. Given the relatively tepid reception of the first book in the series, however, Baum tried to attract young readers by including two characters from his Oz mythos in Sky Island—Button-Bright and Polychrome, originally introduced in The Road to Oz (1909).

The book was dedicated to the author's sister, Mary Louise Baum Brewster.

== Plot summary ==
Trot, one of the characters in the story. Illustration from The Scarecrow of Oz (1915) by John R. Neill

Trot, a little girl who lives on the coast of southern California, meets a strange little boy with a large umbrella. Button Bright has been using his family's magic umbrella to take long-range journeys from his Philadelphia home, and he has gotten as far as California. After an explanation of how the magic umbrella works, the two children, joined by Cap'n Bill, decide to take a trip to a nearby island; they call it "Sky island," because it looks like it's "halfway in the sky"—but the umbrella takes them to a different place entirely, a literal island in the sky.

Sky Island is another split-color country in Baum's fantasy universe, like the Land of Oz. Divided in halves, blue and pink, Sky Island supports two separate races of beings, the Blues (or "Blueskins") and the Pinkies. The two halves are separated by a region shrouded in fog, which both people are reluctant to enter. The three travelers land on the blue side of Sky Island, which is a grim country ruled by a sadistic tyrant, the Boolooroo of the Blues. In Sky Island, as in Oz, no one can be killed or suffer pain, but that doesn't mean one is safe: the Boolooroo's method of punishing disobedience in his subjects is to slice two of his victims into halves using a huge guillotine-type knife and then join the wrong halves back together, creating very unhappy asymmetrical mixed people. This is called "patching." The Boolooroo threatens to do the same to his new visitors; meanwhile he steals the magic umbrella, keeps the visitors imprisoned, and gives Trot as a slave to his daughters, the Six Snubnosed Princesses (named Cerulia, Turquoise, Sapphire, Azure, Cobalt, and Indigo).

The three protagonists manage to escape from the Blues; penetrating the Great Fog Bank that separates the island's halves and meeting its strange inhabitants, they reach the pink side of the island. The Pink Country is a much friendlier and more relaxed place than the blue side, with cheerful residents. In contrast with the Blues, the Pinkies are ruled by a queen, who is required by law to live very modestly, in poverty, in order to assure that her authority to rule will not cause her to become arrogant. The visitors get a better reception, since they are rather pink in color themselves, albeit of a sadly wan and pale shade. Unfortunately, however, the laws of the Pink Country regarding strangers are ambiguous, and the Pinkies interpret them to require that all strangers must be thrown off the edge of Sky Island. At the edge of the island, just as the Pinkies are about to fulfill the law, Polychrome, the daughter of the rainbow who already knows Button Bright from The Road to Oz, descends from the rainbow to rescue him and his friends. She helps Tormaline, the Queen of the Pinkies, re-interpret the law in a way which allows the strangers to stay. Polychrome also discovers another quirk in the Pinkies' law: whichever person in the kingdom has the lightest skin shall be Queen. Since Trot's skin is paler than Tormaline's, Trot becomes Queen of the Pinkies. (Tormaline is delighted to yield to Trot and become an ordinary citizen free from the requirement of poverty).

Trot then uses her new power as Queen to mount an invasion of the Blue Country in order to recover the magic umbrella from the Boolooroo. Cap'n Bill gets captured in battle, and the Boolooroo vows to patch him immediately. The only available "patching partner" is a goat, so Cap'n Bill faces the terrifying prospect of becoming a human/goat patch. Trot must enter the Blue City to rescue him, using a ring of invisibility to conceal herself. Ultimately, with help from a Pinkie-witch, a friendly Blueskin citizen (there is one), and the goat itself, she manages to rescue Cap'n Bill and capture the Boolooroo. With the Boolooroo removed from command, the blue army stands down, peace is declared, and Trot becomes "Booloorooess" of the Blues as well as Queen of the Pinkies. The three travelers then return home, more than a little relieved at their escape from Sky Island.

== Reception ==
Despite the inclusion of Ozite characters, and even though it is, in the judgment of some critics, "far superior" to its predecessor, Sky Island sold even fewer copies in its first year than The Sea Fairies had; 11,750 copies of Sky Island were sold in 1912. Baum attempted to launch two other juvenile novel series in the same 1911–12 period, The Flying Girl and The Daring Twins, neither of which was a long-term success. Disappointing sales inspired Baum and Reilly & Britton to view a return to Oz as an obvious and necessary step, leading to the publication of The Patchwork Girl of Oz and the Little Wizard Stories of Oz the next year, 1913. In 1918, however, Baum wrote that he thought Sky Island would probably be remembered as his best work.
