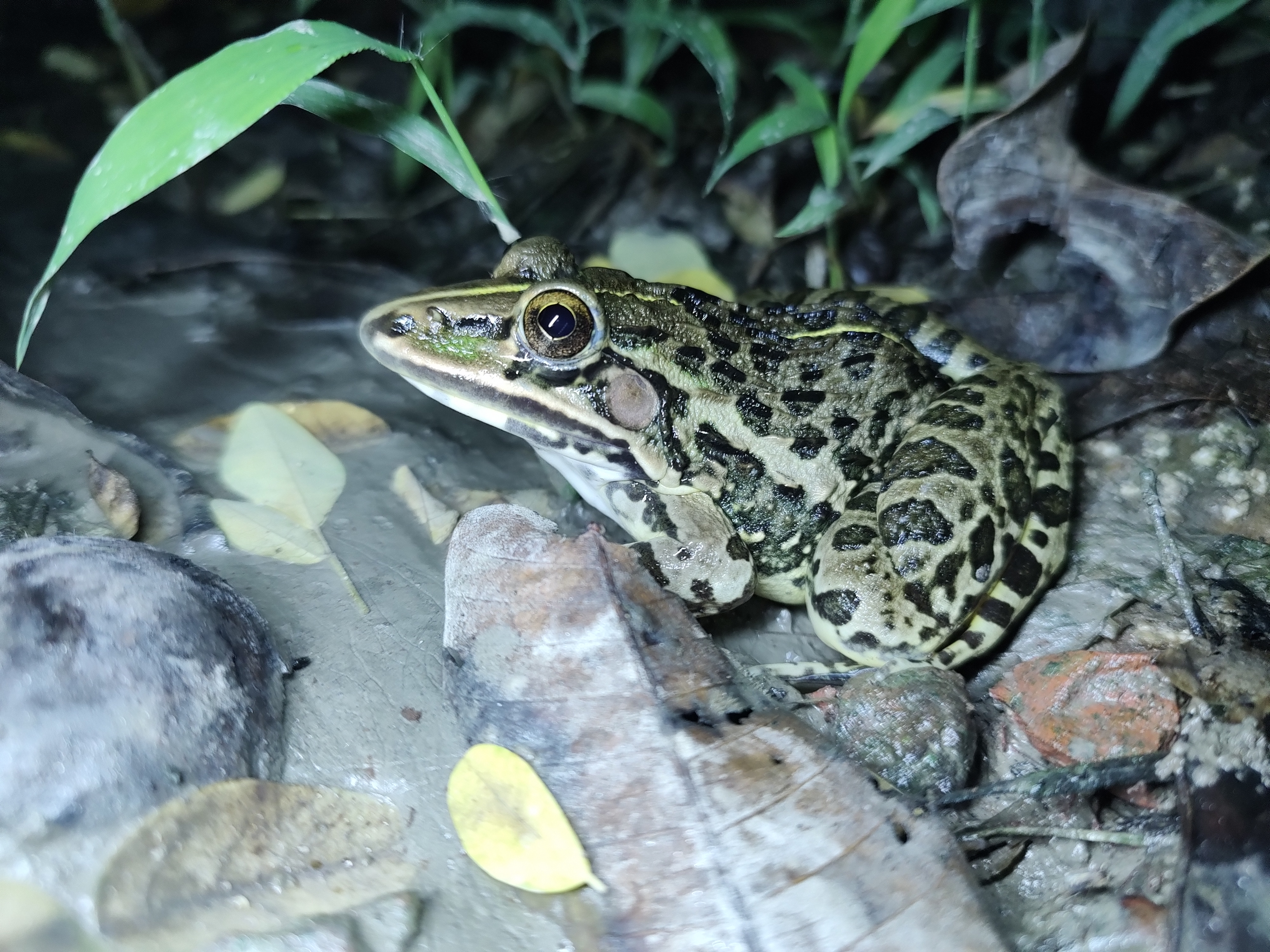
- Lateral view

Conservation status
- Least Concern (IUCN 3.1)

Scientific classification
- Kingdom: Animalia
- Phylum: Chordata
- Class: Amphibia
- Order: Anura
- Family: Dicroglossidae
- Genus: Hoplobatrachus
- Species: H. litoralis

Binomial name
- Hoplobatrachus litoralis Hasan, Kuramoto, Islam, Alam, Khan, & Sumida, 2012

= Hoplobatrachus litoralis =

Species of amphibian

Hoplobatrachus litoralis, commonly known as the Bangladesh coastal bullfrog, is a species of frog in the family Dicroglossidae. It is found in South Asia, parts of Southeast Asia, and China.

== Taxonomy ==
Hoplobatrachus litoralis was first collected in the coastal wetlands of the Cox's Bazar District in southeastern Bangladesh. Because it was found in a coastal area, it got the species name litoralis.

For a long time, these frogs were assumed to be a subspecies of Hoplobatrachus tigerinus, which is also widely distributed across South Asia. The DNA revealed a 3.2% to 14.2% genetic divergence from H. tigerinus. Then it was officially described and named Hoplobatrachus litoralis in a 2012 paper published in the journal Zootaxa.

== Description ==
Hoplobatrachus litoralis is a large species of frog. Adult males possess a snout-vent length ranging from 81.3 to 102.1 millimeters, whereas adult females are even larger, measuring between 83.2 and 121.3 millimeters in length. Their heads are generally longer than they are wide. Normally dark gray with large black spots, their skin features thin longitudinal ridges and a thin, whitish mid-dorsal stripe running down the middle of their back. They are characterized by distinct black bands crossing the nostrils, upper jaw margins, and the inner side of the upper arms.

== Distribution ==
Hoplobatrachus litoralis is distributed across West Bengal, Tripura, Mizoram, Manipur, Assam, and Arunachal Pradesh in India; Ukhia and Teknaf in Cox's Bazar, Bangladesh; Rakhine State and Tanintharyi in Myanmar; Samtse District in Bhutan; and Yunnan in China.
