= The Scarecrow of Oz =

1915 novel by L. Frank Baum

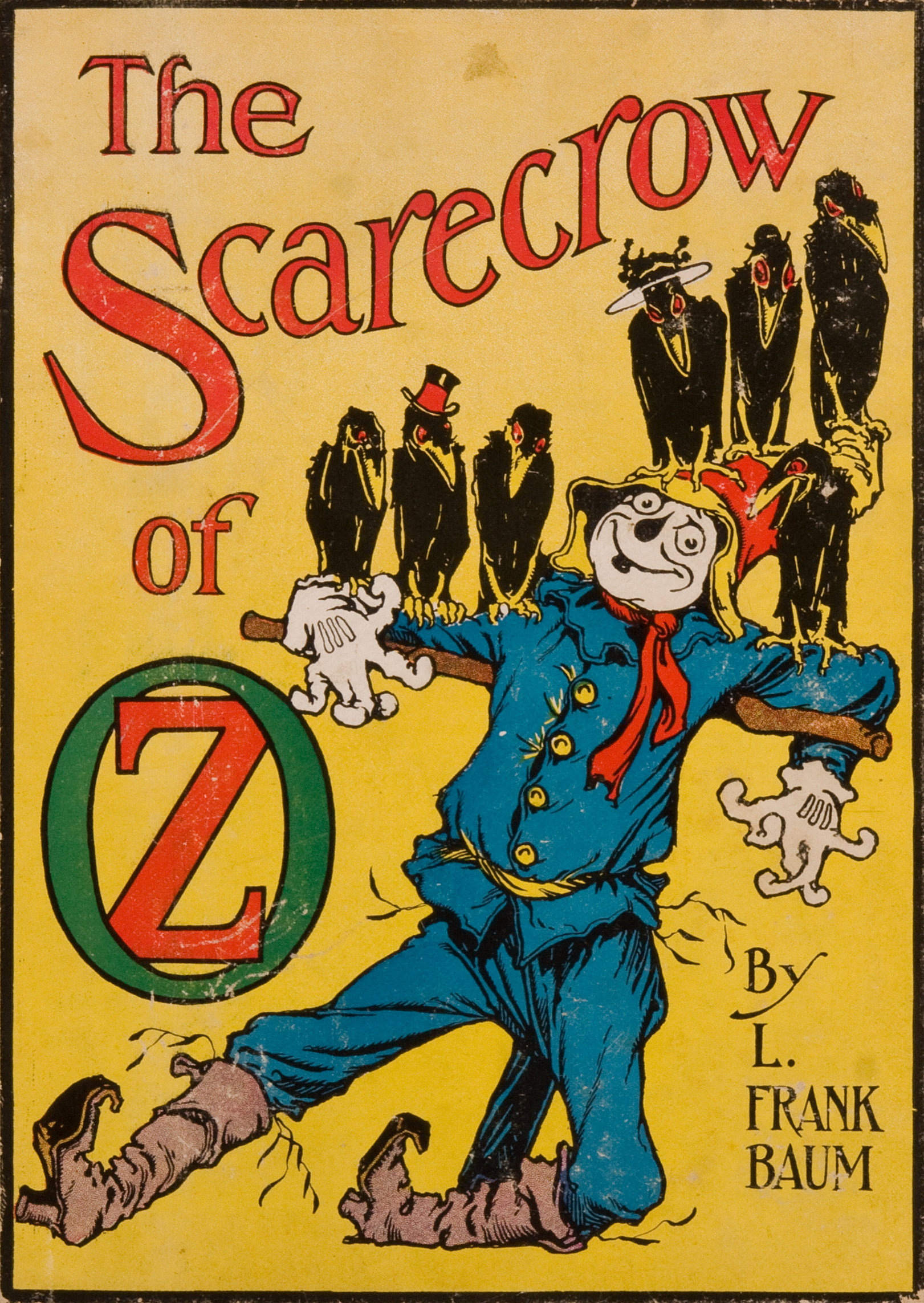
- First edition cover
- Author: L. Frank Baum
- Illustrator: John R. Neill
- Cover artist: John R. Neill
- Language: English
- Series: The Oz books
- Genre: Children's novel
- Publisher: Reilly & Britton
- Publication date: 1915
- Publication place: United States
- Media type: Print (hardcover)
- Preceded by: Tik-Tok of Oz; Sky Island
- Followed by: Rinkitink in Oz

The Scarecrow of Oz is the ninth book in the Oz series written by L. Frank Baum. Published on July 16, 1915, it was Baum's personal favorite of the Oz books and tells of Cap'n Bill and Trot journeying to Oz and, with the help of the Scarecrow, overthrowing the corrupt King Krewl of Jinxland. Cap'n Bill and Trot (Mayre Griffiths) had previously appeared in two other novels by Baum, The Sea Fairies (1911) and Sky Island (1912).

The plot is a re-working of Baum's 1914 silent film, His Majesty, the Scarecrow of Oz. It was followed by Rinkitink in Oz (1916).

== Plot summary ==
Trot, one of the characters in the story. Illustration from The Scarecrow of Oz (1915) by John R. Neill

Cap'n Bill, a sailor with a wooden peg-leg, and his friend, a little girl named Trot, set out from California on a calm day for a short ride in their row-boat. A freak whirlpool capsizes their boat and pulls them under water, where they are carried by mermaids (referred to but not seen) to a cave. They are soon joined by a flying creature called an Ork. Passing through a dark tunnel out of the cave, the three arrive at an island inhabited by a grim man calling himself Pessim the Observer. Cap'n Bill and Trot reduce their size by eating magic shrinking-berries, and the Ork carries them away from the island to the land of Mo, where they eat another type of magic berries and resume their normal size.

They meet the Bumpy Man, who specializes in serving sugar and molasses and has some of their appearance too. They run into Button Bright, the boy from The Road to Oz who has gotten lost again. Cap'n Bill calls down some of the native birds (who, like all birds in fairy countries, can talk back) and offers them the "growing" berries to make them large enough to carry himself, Trot, and Button-Bright to the land of Oz. When they make it across the desert, Button-Bright, Cap'n Bill, and Trot are set down in a field and the Ork leaves them to find his own country, which he got lost from on a routine flight.

The place Button-Bright, Cap'n Bill, and Trot have arrived in, Jinxland, is cut off from the rest of Oz by a range of high mountains and a bottomless crevice. The kingdom has had a turbulent recent history. The rightful king of Jinxland, King Kynd, was removed by his prime minister Phearse, who was in turn removed by his prime minister Krewl who now rules over the land. An unpleasant but wealthy citizen named Googly-Goo seeks to marry King Kynd's daughter, Princess Gloria; however, she is in love with Pon, the current gardener's boy, who is the son of the first usurper Phearse. King Krewl and Googly-Goo hire a witch named Blinkie to freeze Gloria's heart so that she will no longer love Pon. Cap'n Bill happens on this plot, and to keep him from interfering, Blinkie turns him into a grasshopper. She then freezes Gloria's heart. Googly-Goo proposes to her, but now that her heart is frozen, she does not love anyone at all, including Googly-Goo, whose proposal she scornfully declines.

The Scarecrow is at Glinda's palace in the Quadling Country and learns about these events from reading Glinda's Great Book of Records, a magical volume which transcribes every event in the world at the instant it happens. The Scarecrow wants to help Cap'n Bill, Button-Bright, and Trot, and Glinda sends him to Jinxland with some of her magic to aid him. The Scarecrow travels to Jinxland and joins forces with Trot, Cap'n Bill (who is still a grasshopper), and the Ork, who flies off to his homeland for reinforcements. The Scarecrow attempts to depose Krewl and is captured, with Googly-Goo suggesting the Scarecrow be burned, but then the Ork arrives just in time with fifty other Orks, who attack the Jinxlanders and turn the tables on Krewl. The victorious party then arrives at Blinkie's and makes her undo her magic on Cap'n Bill and Princess Gloria by using a magic powder to shrink her in size. When she has undone her evil spells, the Scarecrow stops Blinkie's shrinking, but she remains at a small size and loses all her magic powers.

Gloria takes the throne of Jinxland and elevates Pon to be her royal consort, and the Scarecrow, Button-Bright, Cap'n Bill, Trot, and the Orks return to the Emerald City for a celebration.

== Background ==
The novel is dedicated to The Uplifters of Los Angeles. A select subgroup of the elite Los Angeles Athletic Club, "The Lofty and Exalted Order of Uplifters" was a social and fraternal organization of prominent southern California businessmen and public figures. Baum had been active in the group since he first moved to Los Angeles in 1909 and served among the Excelsiors, the group's governing board. He also wrote and acted in their shows and he played the bass drum in their band.

A small group of Uplifters were the key investors in The Oz Film Manufacturing Company, organized to make movies of Baum books and stories. The investors put up $100,000; Baum was named president, and received a block of stock in the company in payment for the cinema rights to his works. The company's first project was a film of The Patchwork Girl of Oz; and its second, released in October 1914, was His Majesty, the Scarecrow of Oz, produced at a cost of $23,500, and with a cast (according to the not-always factually reliable Baum) of 130.

Baum hoped that the movie would be a success, and provide a big publicity boost to the Scarecrow novel to follow in 1915. Things did not quite work out as the optimistic author hoped; the film did not earn enough to cover its costs. The first edition of the novel sold around 14,300 copies, only a couple hundred more than its predecessor, Tik-Tok of Oz—though in the long run The Scarecrow of Oz would be one of the more popular installments in the Oz series.

Like Tik-Tok, Scarecrow contains a significant romantic element—the Rose Princess and Private Files in the former, and Gloria and Pon in the latter—that was not typical of the earlier Oz books.

Although the journey of an American child to Oz had long been a favorite plot for Baum, this work represented its last appearance: no more children would be inducted into Oz for the duration of his work on the series.

The Ork, voiced by Peter MacNicol, appeared in an episode of The Oz Kids.

The Oz books
Previous book: Tik-Tok of Oz	The Scarecrow of Oz; 1915	Next book: Rinkitink in Oz
