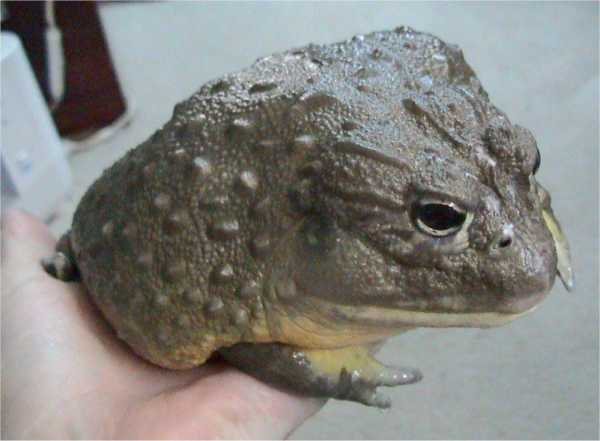
- African bull frog Pyxicephalus adspersus

Scientific classification
- Kingdom: Animalia
- Phylum: Chordata
- Class: Amphibia
- Order: Anura
- Family: Pyxicephalidae
- Subfamily: Pyxicephalinae
- Genus: Pyxicephalus; Tschudi, 1838

Synonyms
- Maltzania Boettger, 1881; Phrynopsis Pfeffer, 1893

= Pyxicephalus =

Genus of amphibians

Pyxicephalus (πυξίς, pyxis = "(round) box," κεφαλή, kephalē = "head") is a genus of true frogs from Sub-Saharan Africa, commonly referred to as African bull frogs or bull frogs. They are very large (P. adspersus) to large (remaining species) frogs, with females significantly smaller than males. They may take decades to reach their full size potential and they are some of the longest-living frogs, possibly able to reach ages as high as 45 years.

These bulky and voracious predators will eat any animal (including small vertebrates and conspecifics) they can fit in their large mouth that has two fang-like projections on the lower jaw, but they are themselves commonly eaten by humans, predatory birds, mammals and monitor lizards. They remain hidden—they are fossorial—for much of the year, but emerge to breed in temporary pools after rains. The tadpoles often are guarded by the male.

== Species ==
There are five recognized sub species:

Species	Common name	Distribution
Pyxicephalus adspersus (Tschudi, 1838)	African bullfrog	Angola, Botswana, Malawi, Mozambique, Namibia, South Africa, Tanzania, Zambia, Zimbabwe, Democratic Republic of the Congo and Eswatini.
Pyxicephalus angusticeps Parry, 1877		
Pyxicephalus edulis (Glauert, 1952)	Edible bullfrog	
Pyxicephalus obbianus (Sternfeld, 1919)	Calabresi's bullfrog	Northeastern and central Somalia

P. edulis has long been confused with P. adspersus, and species limits between them are not fully understood. Additionally, P. angusticeps was only revalidated in 2013, and some authorities still do not recognize it. Another sometimes used name in the genus is P. cordofanus Steindachner, 1867, but it is a nomen dubium; the International Union for Conservation of Nature lists it as "data deficient", citing "continuing doubts as to its taxonomic validity, extent of occurrence, status and ecological requirements".
