= The Sea Fairies =

1911 novel by L. Frank Baum

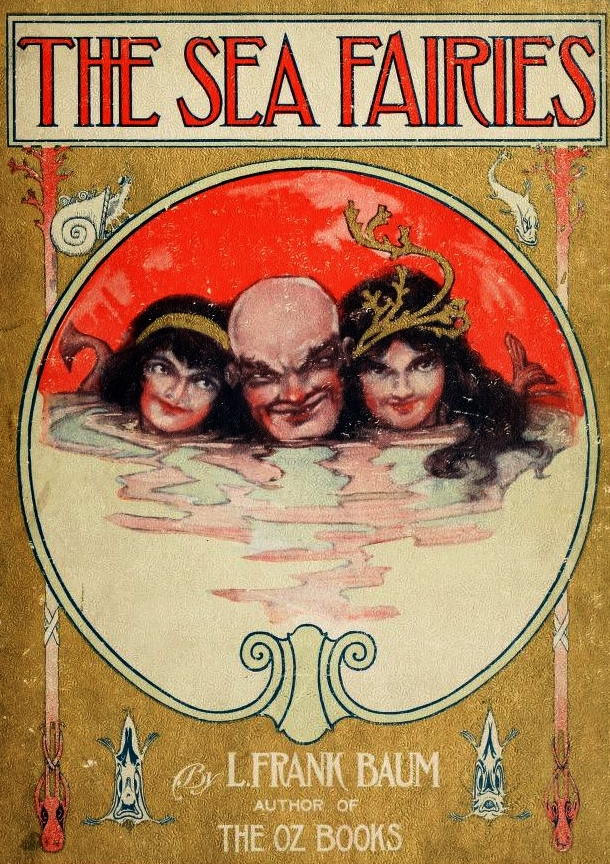
- First edition
- Author: L. Frank Baum
- Illustrator: John R. Neill
- Language: English
- Genre: Children's novel
- Publisher: Reilly & Britton
- Publication date: 1911
- Publication place: United States
- Media type: Print (hardcover)
- Pages: 240 pp.
- Followed by: Sky Island

The Sea Fairies is a children's fantasy novel written by L. Frank Baum, illustrated by John R. Neill, and published in 1911 by the Reilly & Britton Company, the publisher of Baum's series of Oz books.

== Genre ==
As an underwater fantasy, Baum's The Sea Fairies can be classed with earlier books with similar themes, like Charles Kingsley's The Water-Babies (1863), and successors too, like E. Nesbit's Wet Magic (1913). Baum's novel has no relation to the 1830 poem of the same name by Alfred, Lord Tennyson. In 1905, however, a musical setting of Tennyson's poem for female chorus and orchestra, composed by Amy Beach, was in performance; the title may have stuck in the back of Baum's mind.

== Plot ==
Trot, one of the characters in the story. Illustration from The Scarecrow of Oz (1915) by John R. Neill

Mayre Griffiths, nicknamed Trot, or sometimes Tiny Trot, is a little girl who lives on the coast of southern California. Her father is the captain of a sailing schooner, and her constant companion is Cap'n Bill Weedles, a retired sailor with a wooden leg. (Cap'n Bill had been Trot's father's skipper, and Charlie Griffiths had been his mate, before the accident that took the older man's leg.) Trot and Cap'n Bill spend many of their days roaming the beaches near home, or rowing and sailing along the coast. One day, Trot wishes that she could see a mermaid; her wish is overheard, and granted the next day. The mermaids explain to Trot, and the distressed Cap'n Bill, that they are benevolent fairies; when they offer Trot a chance to visit their world in mermaid form, Trot is enthusiastic, and Bill is too loyal to let her go off without him.

So begins their sojourn among the sea fairies. They see amazing sights in the land of Queen Aquarine and King Anko (including an octopus who is mortified to learn that he's the symbol of the Standard Oil Company). They also encounter a villain called Zog the Magician, a monstrous hybrid of man, animal, and fish, one of the very few absolutely irredeemable, pure-evil characters in Baum's writings. Zog and his sea devils capture them and hold them prisoner. The two protagonists discover that many sailors thought to have been drowned have actually been captured and enslaved by Zog. Trot and Cap'n Bill survive Zog's challenges, and the villain is eventually defeated by the forces of good. Trot and Cap'n Bill are returned to human form, safe and dry after their undersea adventure.

As many readers and critics have observed, Baum's Oz in particular and his fantasy novels in general are dominated by puissant and virtuous female figures; the archetype of the father-figure plays little role in Baum's fantasy world. The Sea Fairies is a lonely exception to this overall trend: "The sea serpent King Anko...is the closest approximation to a powerful, benevolent father figure in Baum's fantasies."

== Reception ==
Baum had decided to end the Oz series with The Emerald City of Oz in 1910, after six installments over the first decade of the twentieth century. The Sea Fairies was intended to be the first in a new series of fantasy novels, which Baum and Reilly & Britton continued the next year with Sky Island. Unfortunately for author and publisher, the two volumes of the new projected series did not meet with the same success as the Oz books previously had. The first edition of The Sea Fairies sold 12,400 copies in its initial year on the market, where The Emerald City of Oz had sold 20,000. Even when Baum's books experienced a major resurgence in interest and sales in 1918, The Sea Fairies sold only 611 copies that year while the Oz books and even Baum's non-Oz works were selling thousands of copies.

Once Baum returned to writing Oz books with The Patchwork Girl of Oz in 1913, the Trot series was retired – but the main characters lived on. Trot and Cap'n Bill are the main protagonists in The Scarecrow of Oz (1915) — the plot of which was reworked from the projected third book in their aborted series – and play a significant role in The Magic of Oz (1919). Trot makes brief appearances in all of Baum's remaining Oz sequels, and also plays significant roles in some official and non-official sequels by various authors.

== Other authors in various media ==
In 1985, an independent producer commissioned a script based on The Sea Fairies as a follow-up to the movie Return to Oz, but because of the films poor reception, the project was apparently dropped.

The Oz Kids TV episode Journey Beneath the Sea (1997) is a loose adaptation of The Sea Fairies.

Boomerang's animation series Dorothy and the Wizard of Oz (2017-2020) has guest appearances by Trot and Cap'n Bill, who is depicted as a boy Trot's age, in loose adaptations of The Sea Fairies and Sky Island.
