= Frank Ver Beck =

American illustrator

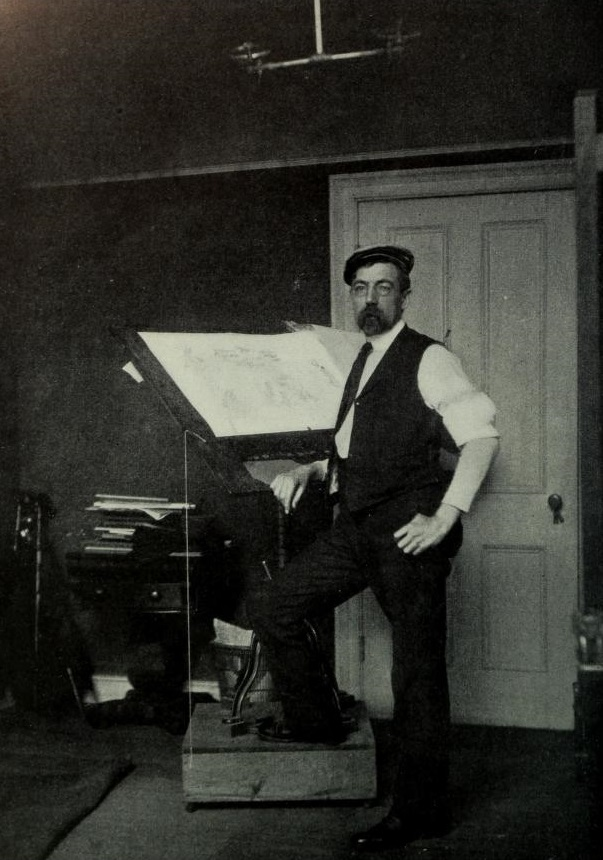
Frank Ver Beck in his studio

William Francis Ver Beck (June 1, 1858 – July 13, 1933) was an American illustrator known for his comedic drawings of animals.

== Biography ==
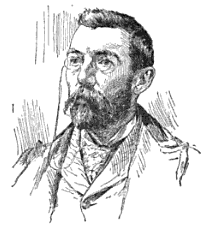
Portrait of Ver Beck, 1894

Ver Beck was born in Richland Township, Belmont County, Ohio as the son of a shoemaker. He studied art and woodcarving under Mansfield, Ohio artist Robert R. "Railroad" Smith and worked as a wood engraver.

In 1881 or 1882, Ver Beck moved to New York City. There he studied art and became a freelance illustrator for magazines including Scribner's, The Ladies Home Journal, and Collier's.

In 1894 in Munsey's Magazine, Harold Payne wrote:

For quaintness of conceit and weirdness of treatment William Francis Ver Beck has no parallel. His specialty is in making animals, and particularly reptiles, to represent human beings in comical situations. He invests crocodiles, turtles, lizards, frogs, and other amphibiae with human attributes, places them in all sorts of ludicrous positions, and carries them through endless laughable experiences. He even descends to the vegetable kingdom for his subjects, and invests cabbages, carrots, and beets with the power of lingual communication. Indeed, Ver Beck might well be designated as the artistic Aesop of the time.

Ver Beck was one of author Stephen Crane's first friends in New York City. One winter evening Crane and British artist Phil May borrowed a tiger skin belonging to Ver Beck and were arrested walking huddled under the skin on Broadway in the early morning hours. They were released but the policeman kept the tiger skin. Also in New York City, in 1895 Ver Beck witnessed the shooting of Solomon Mann by David Hannigan and testified in Hannigan's trial.

Shortly before World War I, Ver Beck moved to England. In 1913 he was working in St Ives, Cornwall with his wife, the American-born artist and writer Hanna Rion, (1875—1924). Their relationship ended and she remarried in 1921. He died at the age of 75 in Essex.

== Published books ==
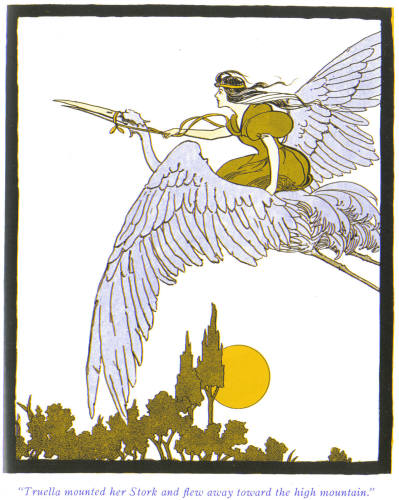
Ver Beck's illustration of Princess Truella on a stork (1900) from A New Wonderland and The Magical Monarch of Mo

- Half-Hours with JimmieBoy by Albert Bigelow Paine; R. H. Russell, New York (1893)
- The Book of Lies by John Langdon Heaton; The Morse Co. (1896)
- The Dumpies by Albert Bigelow Paine; R. H. Russell, New York AND Kegan Paul, Trench, Trűbner & Co., London (1897)
- The Arkansas Bear by Albert Bigelow Paine; R. H. Russell, New York (1898). Reprinted by Henry Altemus Co., Philadelphia (1902)
- The Three Bears; R. H. Russell, New York (1899) – an edition of "Goldilocks and the Three Bears"
- Acrobatic Animals; R. H. Russell, New York (1899)
- Beasts and Birds (1900) No information about this book can be found. Not found in the Library of Congress catalog or Publishers' Weekly. If the book exists, it is not the one from The American Tract Society.
- The Little Boy Book by Helen Hay; R. H. Russell, New York (1900)
- A Handbook of Golf for Bears; R. H. Russell, New York (1900)
- A New Wonderland by L. Frank Baum; R. H. Russell, New York (1900) – original title of The Magical Monarch of Mo (see image)
- Two Thousand Miles on an Automobile by "Chauffeur" [pseud. of Arthur Jerome Eddy]; J. B. Lippincott Co., New York (1902)
- Barbara Ladd by Charles G. D. Roberts; The American News Co., New York (1902)
- The Book of Bugs by Harvey Sutherland; Street & Smith, New York and London (1902)
- The Surprising Adventures of The Magical Monarch of Mo and His People by L. Frank Baum; The Bobbs-Merrill Co., Indianapolis (1903) – a lightly revised edition of A New Wonderland
- Poketown People: Parables in Black by Ella Middleton Tybout; J. B. Lippincott Co., New York (1904)
- Told by Uncle Remus: New Stories of the Old Plantation by Joel Chandler Harris; McClure, Phillips & Co., New York (1905)
- Ver Beck's Book of Bears; J. B. Lippincott Co., New York (1906)
- The Adventures of JouJou by Edith MacVane; J. B. Lippincott Co., New York (1906)
- Elsie and the Arkansaw Bear by Albert Bigelow Paine; Henry Altemus Co., Philadelphia (1909)
- The Fall of Ulysses by Charles Dwight Willard; George H. Doran Co., New York (1912)
- Ver Beck's Bears in Mother Goose-Land New Lines by Hanna Rion (wife of Frank Ver Beck); George H. Doran Co. New York AND Humphrey Milford, London [1915]

Ver Beck's Little Story Books:

- The Little Lost Bear; Henry Frowde and Hodder & Stoughton, London (1915); reprinted by Humphrey Milford, London Published in America as A Short Little Tale from Bruintown; Frederick A. Stokes Co., New York (1915)
- Timothy Turtle's Great Day; Henry Frowde and Hodder & Stoughton, London (1916) AND Frederick A. Stokes Co., New York (1916); reprinted by Humphrey Milford, London.
- The Donkey Child; Humphrey Milford, London (1918)
- The Elephant Child; Humphrey Milford, London (1920)
- The Little Cat Who Journeyed to St. Ives; Humphrey Milford, London (1921)
- The Little Lost Lamb; Humphrey Milford, London (1922)
- Piggywiggen: A Little Pig Who Went to Market; Humphrey Milford, London (1924)

Another Bear Book

- The Little Bear Who Ran Away From Bruintown; Small, Maynard and Co., Boston (1923)

Wee Books for Wee Folks. These were all reprinted later by The Platt & Munk Co. Inc., New York:

- Flapsy Flopper of the Farm Yard by May Wynne; Henry Altemus Co., Philadelphia (1925)
- Hootie Toots of Hollow Tree by May Wynne; Henry Altemus Co., Philadelphia (1925)
- Little Black Sambo and the Baby Elephant; Henry Altemus Co., Philadelphia (1925)
- Little Black Sambo and the Tiger Kitten; Henry Altemus Co., Philadelphia (1926)
- Little Black Sambo and the Monkey People; Henry Altemus Co., Philadelphia (1929)
- Little Black Sambo in the Bear's Den; Henry Altemus Co., Philadelphia (1930)
- Little Black Sambo and the Crocodiles; Henry Altemus Co., Philadelphia (1930)

Later Books

- The Arkansas Bear Complete by Albert Bigelow Paine; Henry Altemus Co., Philadelphia ( (1929) - a compilation of the earlier two Arkansaw Bear books
- The Bedtime Animal Story Book; The Platt & Munk Co. Inc., New York (1935) - a compilation of Ver Beck's first two Wee Books for Wee Folks, along with two other stories.
- The Little Black Sambo Story Book; The Platt & Munk Co. Inc., New York (1935) - a compilation of Helen Bannerman's original story plus Ver Beck's five Wee Books for Wee Folks.
- Bobbylinkapoo by Theodore Marburg; Dorrance and Co., Philadelphia (1937)
