= Rinkitink in Oz =

1916 novel by L. Frank Baum

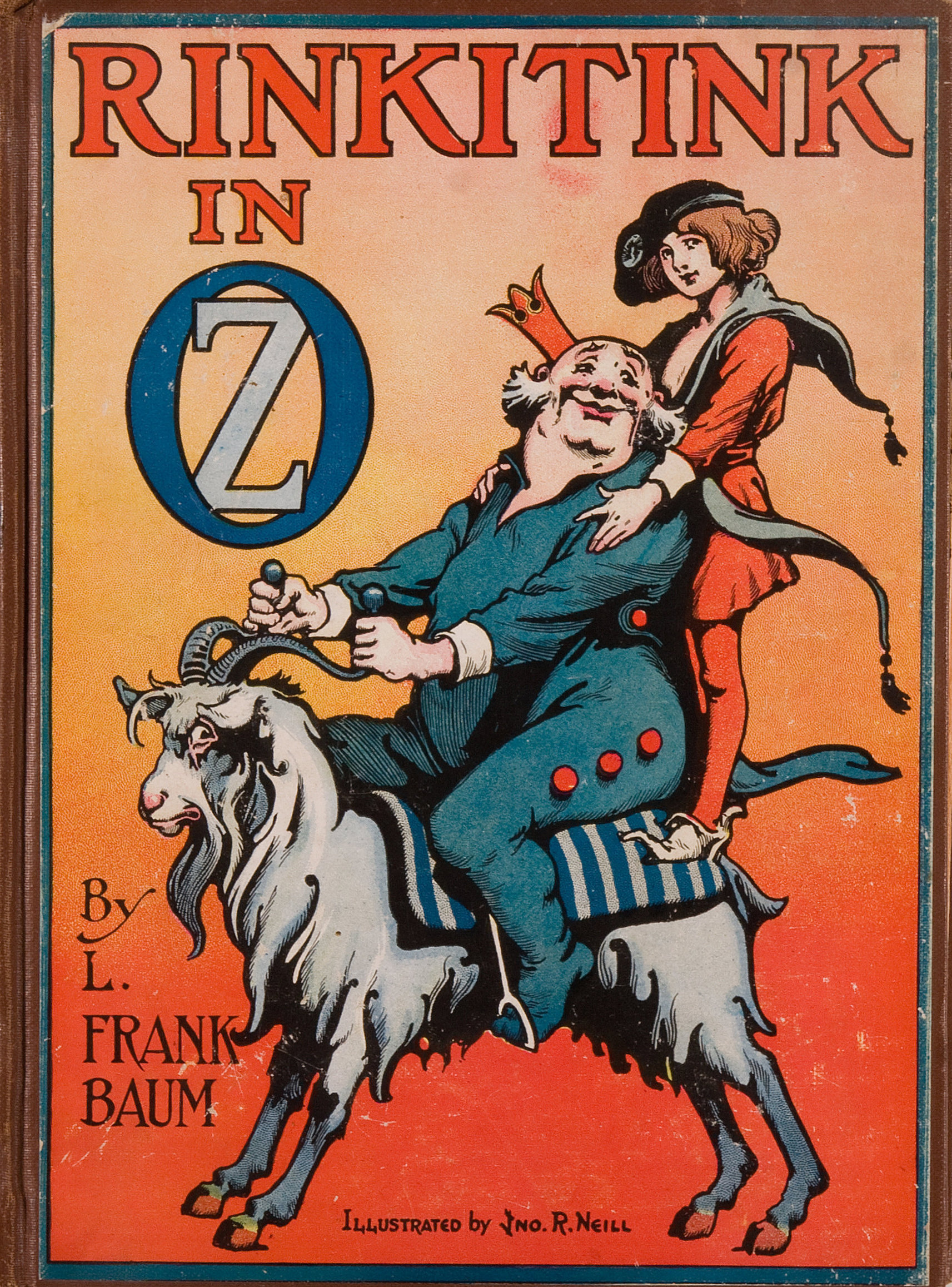
- The original 1916 book cover
- Author: L. Frank Baum
- Illustrator: John R. Neill
- Language: English
- Series: The Oz books
- Genre: Children's novel
- Publisher: Reilly & Britton
- Publication date: 1916
- Publication place: United States
- Media type: Print (Hardcover)
- Preceded by: The Scarecrow of Oz
- Followed by: The Lost Princess of Oz

Rinkitink in Oz is the tenth book in the Oz series written by L. Frank Baum. It was published on June 20, 1916, with full-color and black-and-white illustrations by artist John R. Neill. It is notable that most of the action takes place outside of Oz, and no character from Oz appears in the novel until its climax; this is due to Baum's having originally written most of the book as a fantasy novel unrelated to his Oz books over ten years earlier, in 1905. It was followed by The Lost Princess of Oz (1917).

== Plot summary ==
Prince Inga is the son of King Kitticut and Queen Garee, who rule the island kingdom of Pingaree. Kitticut tells Inga that years earlier, when armies from the neighboring islands of Regos and Coregos attempted to invade and conquer Pingaree, they were repelled by Kitticut himself with the aid of three magic pearls. The blue pearl gives its bearer superhuman strength, the pink pearl protects him from any harm, and the white pearl speaks words of wisdom.

The jovial fat King Rinkitink of Gilgad arrives in Pingaree on royal holiday, and remains as Kitticut's guest for several weeks. Rinkitink usually rides Bilbil, a surly talking goat. One day invaders from Regos and Coregos arrive again, and seize King Kitticut before he can reach his magic pearls. All the people are carried into slavery, except Inga and Rinkitink who escape along with Bilbil. Inga resolves to free his people with the aid of the magic pearls. Keeping the pearls secret from Rinkitink, he hides them in his shoes, and the three sail to Regos.

The wicked King Gos of Regos and his army are easily defeated by the strength and invulnerability of Inga, and they flee to the neighboring island of Coregos, ruled by the equally wicked Queen Cor. Inga and Rinkitink sleep in the palace, but the next morning both shoes along with the pink and blue pearls they contain are accidentally lost. The shoes are found by a poor charcoal burner, who takes them home to give to his daughter Zella. Queen Cor arrives on Regos and captures the now powerless Inga and Rinkitink, and brings them back to Coregos.

Zella, wearing the shoes but unaware of the power they convey, travels to the palace on Coregos to sell honey to Queen Cor. Inga sees her and, recognizing her shoes, trades shoes with her. Again possessing the pearls, he overpowers Cor who escapes and flees to Regos. Inga frees the enslaved people of Pingaree, who sail back home. However his parents are still captives of Gos and Cor, who take them to the neighboring country of the subterranean Nomes, and pay the Nome King Kaliko to use his magic to keep them captive.

Inga, Rinkitink and Bilbil arrive in the Nome Kingdom. For safety, Rinkitink carries the pink pearl which confers invulnerability. The Nome King refuses to release Inga's parents because of his promise to Cor and Gos, although he claims to bear no animosity toward the travelers. Rinkitink and Inga sleep in the Nome King's palace that night, but in the morning Kaliko attempts to kill both of them by various devious traps. Both escape by means of the power of the pearls they carry.

In Oz, Dorothy learns of these events and travels to the Nome Kingdom with the Wizard of Oz to confront Kaliko. She forces him to release Inga's parents. Reunited with Inga, they all travel to Oz. The Wizard discovers that Bilbil is actually Prince Bobo of Boboland who has been turned into a goat by a cruel magician. He and Glinda are able to restore him to human form, which also cures his disagreeable disposition.

Inga, his parents, Rinkitink, and Bobo return to the rebuilt island of Pingaree. Soon afterwards, a boat arrives from Gilgad to take Rinkitink back home. Rinkitink objects that he does not want to return to his royal duties, but eventually is persuaded to return, accompanied by his friend Prince Bobo.

== Reissues ==
In 1939, Rinkitink in Oz was one of six Oz books specially reissued by Rand McNally in a condensed, small-format "junior edition" for young readers, as a promotion for the MGM film of The Wizard of Oz.

According to A Brief Guide to Oz, a "brief racial insult — a tottenhot is a lesser form of man - has been excised from some later editions."

The Oz books
Previous book: The Scarecrow of Oz	Rinkitink of Oz; 1916	Next book: The Lost Princess of Oz
