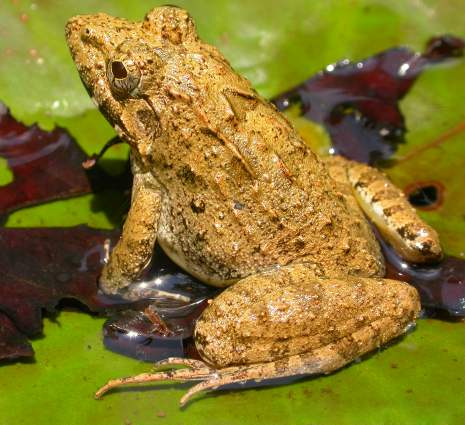
- Hoplobatrachus tigerinus from the Western Ghats

Scientific classification
- Domain: Eukaryota
- Kingdom: Animalia
- Phylum: Chordata
- Class: Amphibia
- Order: Anura
- Family: Dicroglossidae
- Subfamily: Dicroglossinae
- Genus: Hoplobatrachus; Peters, 1863

Species
- 5 recognized species, see article.

= Hoplobatrachus =

Genus of amphibians

Hoplobatrachus is a genus of frogs in the family Dicroglossidae. This genus is found in both sub-Saharan Africa and southern and south-eastern Asia. It is the sister taxon of Euphlyctis, although there is some evidence that it might be paraphyletic with respect to Euphlyctis. These frogs are sometimes known as the crowned bullfrogs or the tiger frogs.

== Species ==
The following species are recognised in the genus Hoplobatrachus:

- Hoplobatrachus chinensis (Osbeck, 1765)
- Hoplobatrachus crassus (Jerdon, 1854)
- Hoplobatrachus litoralis Hasan, Kuramoto, Islam, Alam, Khan, and Sumida, 2012
- Hoplobatrachus occipitalis (Günther, 1858)
- Hoplobatrachus salween Thongproh et al., 2022
- Hoplobatrachus tigerinus (Daudin, 1802)
