= Bullfrog International =

Hot tub manufacturer

- Industry: Hot Tub & Spa
- Founded: 1997
- Headquarters: Bluffdale, Utah, USA

Bullfrog International, LC, founded in 1997, is a Utah-based company that designs and manufactures hot tubs with a branded feature called the JetPak Therapy System. Bullfrog International currently distributes products in the United States, Canada, Australia, New Zealand, South America, Asia, and Europe.

In February 2011, Bullfrog International named Jerry Pasley, former Executive Vice President at Jacuzzi Hot Tubs and Sundance Spas, as CEO.
