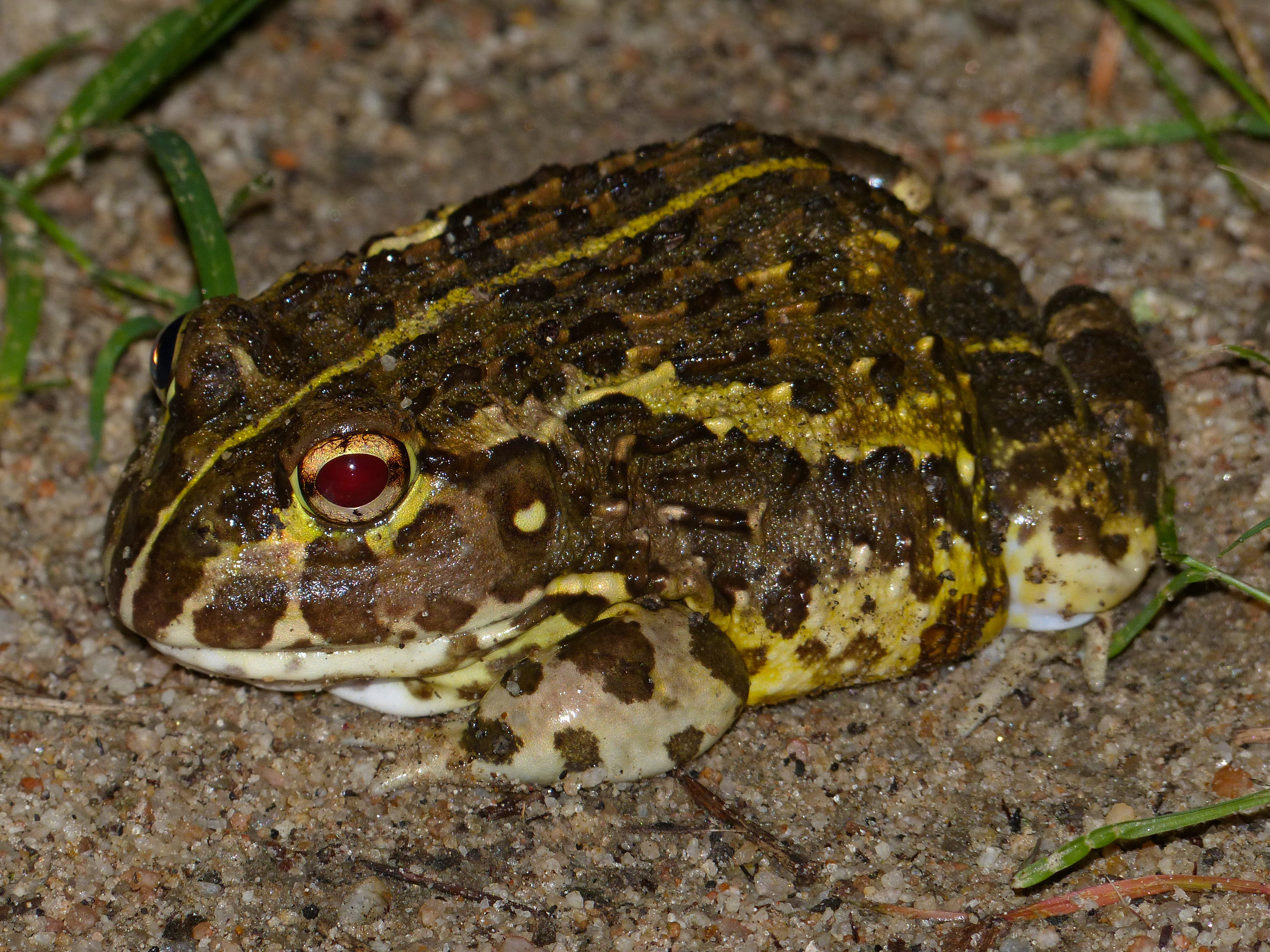

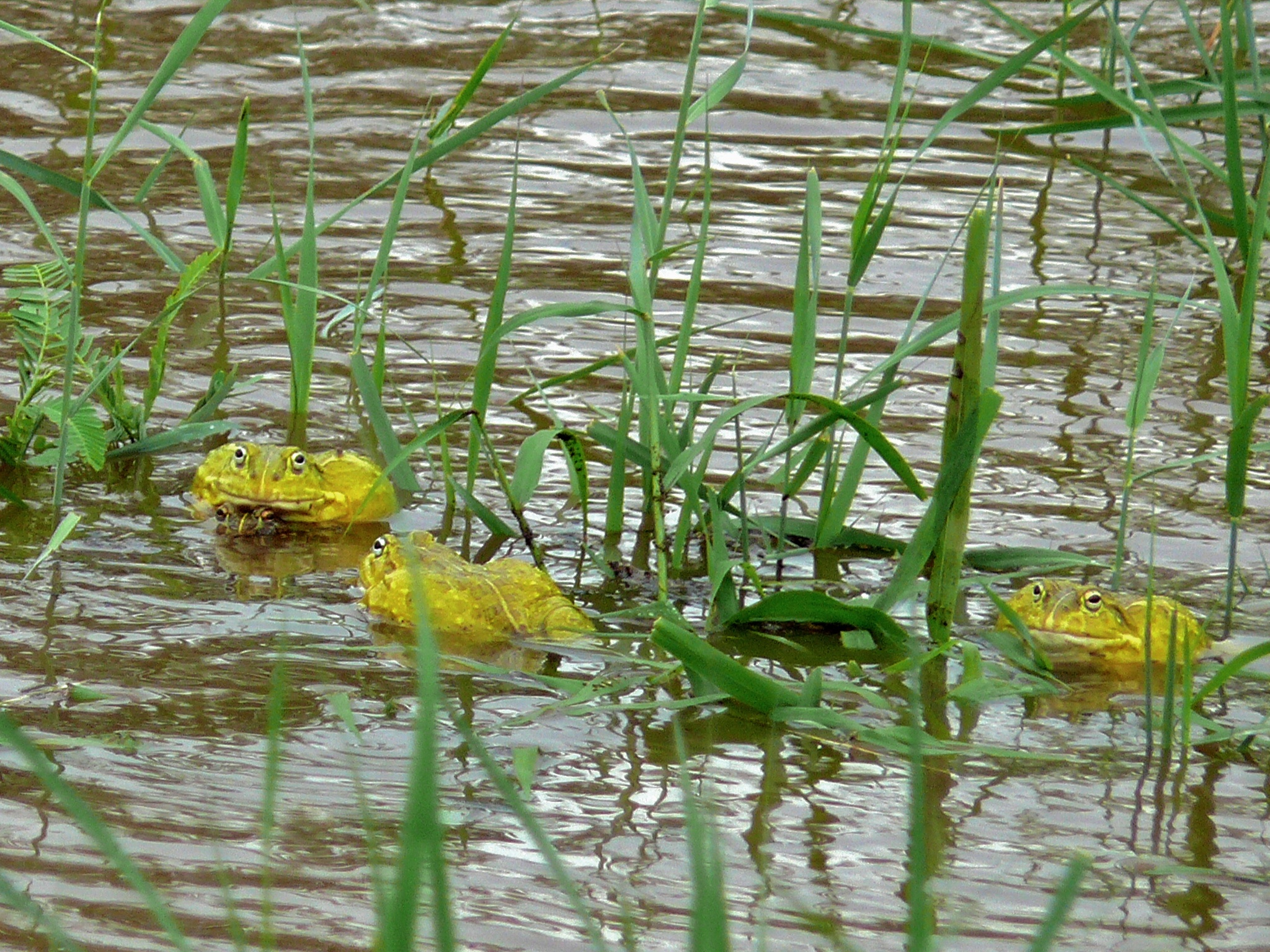

Conservation status
- Least Concern (IUCN 3.1)

Scientific classification
- Kingdom: Animalia
- Phylum: Chordata
- Class: Amphibia
- Order: Anura
- Family: Pyxicephalidae
- Genus: Pyxicephalus
- Species: P. edulis

Binomial name
- Pyxicephalus edulis Peters, 1854

Synonyms
- Maltzania bufonia Boettger, 1881; Rana maltzanii Boulenger, 1882; Phrynopsis boulengerii Pfeffer, 1893; Pyxicephalus flavigula Calabresi, 1916; Rana bufonia (Boettger, 1881); Phrynopsis usambarae Ahl, 1924; Rana (Pyxicephalus) flavigula (Calabresi, 1916); Rana (Pyxicephalus) reiensis Monard, 1951

= Edible bullfrog =

Species of amphibian

The edible bullfrog (Pyxicephalus edulis), also known as the pixie frog, lesser bullfrog or Peter's bullfrog, is a large-bodied African species of frog in the family Pyxicephalidae.

== Description ==
The edible bullfrog is a large bodied frog in which the males typically reach 8.3–12 cm (3.3–4.7 in) in snout–to–vent length and the females 8.5–11 cm (3.3–4.3 in). Exceptionally large males may even reach 13.8 cm (5.4 in), although the species does not approach the sizes attained by the related African bullfrog (P. adspersus). The females of the edible bullfrog are much less bulky than the males and typically reach just half of the weight of the males. There are two tooth like structures in the lower jaw of the broad mouth bears which point upwards. The skin of the edible bullfrog has slight, rather rounded warts. It has short lateral ridges which never stretch all the way from the head to the end of the body, their form changes considerably as the frog grows. The young frogs are quite sturdy and look almost plump but the adults show dorsoventral flattening. As the frogs grow their eyes become more centrally placed, and the eyes of adults are very protruding. They show a distinct tympanum, which is large and oval in shape. The front feet are unwebbed but the hind feet are webbed.

The backs of adult animals is more or less uniform yellow green to drab olive green with the males tending to be greener than the more olive brown females. The females may show a pale stripe along the backbone, light lines on the ridges and warts, these are less common in males. The newly metamorphosed young often have a bright, light green stripe along the middle of the back, with gold-brown speckles and black markings on their dark green skin and the lips and extremities where they form black bars. The lower half of the body is uniformly white or cream, although the male has a dark yellow throat.

== Voice ==
A short, deep "whoop" call which lasts from 0.11 to 0.29 sec, and is made at irregular intervals.

== Distribution ==
The edible bullfrog is found in Angola, Benin, Botswana, Burkina Faso, Chad, Kenya, Malawi, Mali, Mauritania, Mozambique, Nigeria, Tanzania, Zambia and Zimbabwe; but there is some confusion due to misidentification with similar closely related species such as African bullfrog Pyxicephalus adspersus.

== Habitat ==
Flooded grasslands, in northern Cameroon it seems to prefer open marshy areas. While elsewhere flooded meadows and ditches are recorded. Edible bullfrogs show a preference for clay or sand substrates.

== Biology ==
The edible bullfrog spends approximately 10 months of the year in aestivation beneath the surface of the soil, only emerging to breed in numbers if sufficiently heavy rain, i.e. more than 70 mm (2.8 in), falls within a short period. After which male edible bullfrogs call on the flooded grassland and from any small, temporary pools such as included roadside ditches, shallow excavations where the water is shallow, less than 200 mm (7.9 in) in depth and had flooded vegetation. Breeding appears to occur during the day and breeding activity and calling had decreased substantially by midday.

The males gathered in loose groups in the shallow water, each congregation centred on a dominant male which charged at, bit and tossed any other males that approached too closely. Some males, however, would head straight for the dominant male. These aggressive bouts often caused serious injuries and there were even some that ended in the death of one of the combatants. The females move freely within and between these male gatherings with the males pursuing them. Courtship is simple and the female begins laying soon after amplexus commences. Once paired, the other frogs did not generally disturb by other frogs, but displacement of the male from the female by another male has been recorded. The spawn is laid in shallow water.

Males call from shallow water lying in the water with their heads and vocal sacs above the surface, their deep calls causing a rippling effect in the water, calling decreases as the day progressed and, if the rain is short-lived the frog will cease calling quite quickly.

The diet consists of insects including Coleoptera which were found in 100% of stomach contents sampled, as were Orthoptera while Isoptera, Diplopoda, Hymenoptera and spiders were also recorded. Some vegetation was also recorded but this is assumed to have been swallowed accidentally when capturing animal prey.

The aggregation of breeding frogs attracts several bird predators and these have included yellow-billed kite Milvus aegyptius, marabou stork Leptoptilos crumeniferus, saddle-billed stork Ephippiorhynchus senegalensis, intermediate egret Mesophoyx intermedia, grey heron Ardea cinerea and black-headed heron Ardea melanocephala. Some edible bullfrogs were seen to lunge at water birds that got too close, possibly these were males aggressively defending their territories. After spawning the males guard the tadpoles and may dig channels for them if their natal pool is drying out too quickly.

== Human use ==
Edible bullfrogs are locally, widely used for human consumption, although not at a subsistence level. It is occasionally found in the international pet trade.

== Conservation ==
A major threat to the populations of edible bullfrogs in most of its range is collection of frogs for local consumption. Edible bullfrogs are sometimes also found in the international pet trade but at levels that are low enough that they do not constitute a major threat to the species. In some areas, e.g. western Tanzania, habitat loss such as the conversion of miombo to agricultural land may combine with over exploitation to reduce populations.

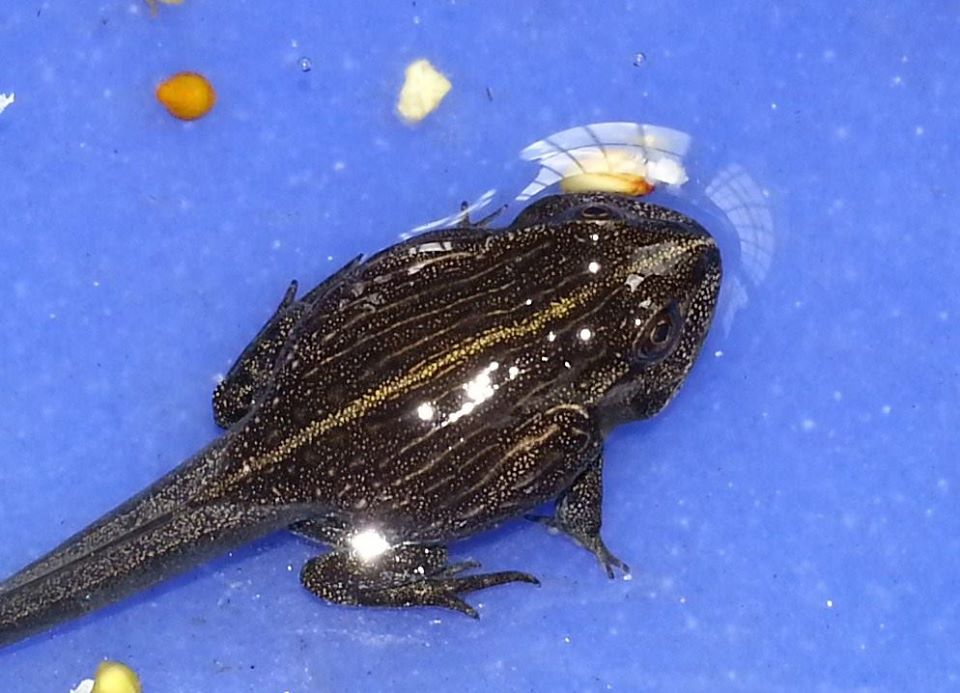
Immature specimen

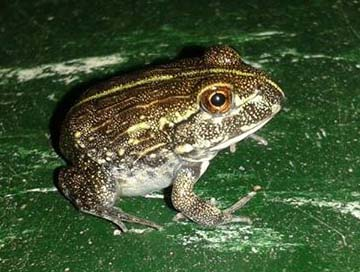
Immature specimen
