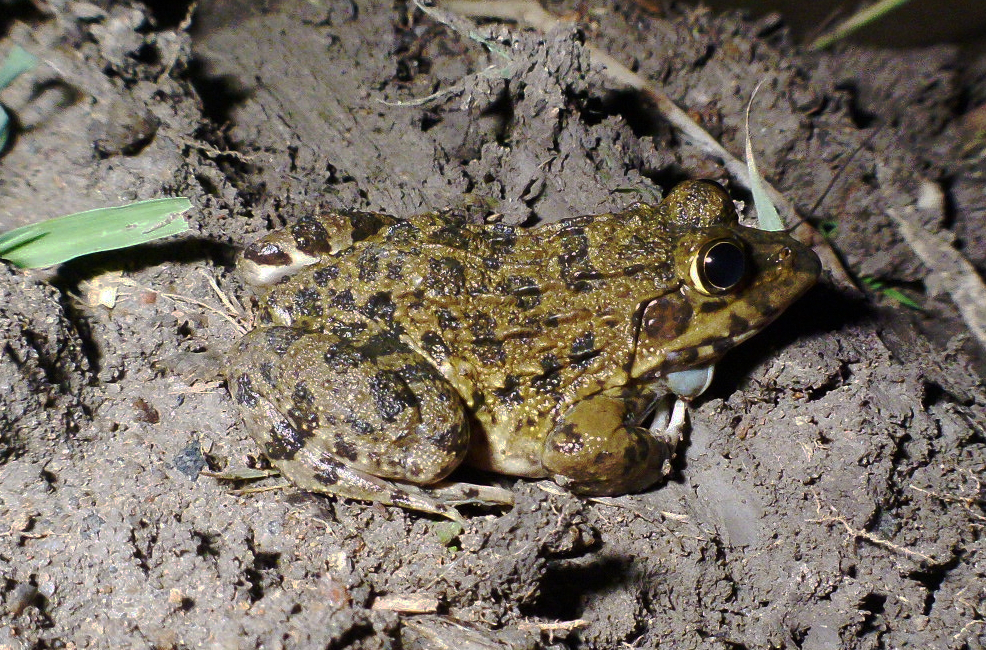

Conservation status
- Least Concern (IUCN 3.1)

Scientific classification
- Kingdom: Animalia
- Phylum: Chordata
- Class: Amphibia
- Order: Anura
- Family: Dicroglossidae
- Genus: Hoplobatrachus
- Species: H. crassus

Binomial name
- Hoplobatrachus crassus (Jerdon, 1854)

Synonyms
- Rana malabarica Kelaart, 1853; Rana crassa Jerdon, 1853; Hoplobatrachus ceylanicus Peters, 1863

= Hoplobatrachus crassus =

Species of frog

Hoplobatrachus crassus, also called Jerdon's bullfrog, Jerdon's bull frog, and South Indian bullfrog, is a species of frog found widely distributed on the plains of India, Bangladesh, Nepal, and Sri Lanka. Its range may extend to the adjacent Bhutan and Myanmar.

== Description ==
This species has a shovel shaped metatarsal tubercle and has longer hind legs than the somewhat similar H. tigrinus with which it overlaps in part of its range. When the leg is stretched along the body the tibio-tarsal (ankle) joint lies at a position between the ear and eye. Females are slightly larger than males (about 8–10 cm or more while males are about 5–8 cm). The skin of the dorsum is olive green to yellow in color with brown or black spots. Some individuals have a yellow stripe down the spine.

== Habitat and ecology ==
Hoplobatrachus crassus is a terrestrial frog that lives in seasonally flooded dry grasslands, open plains and arid areas, also in cultivated areas and near human settlements. Adult frogs are often found in burrows. They may aestivate during dry periods. Breeding takes place in water. Males have two vocal sacs on the side and the call sounds somewhat like a bleating goat. The calls last for a few minutes and consist of 2 to 4 series of 13–18 bleating pulses. They breed with the onset of the rains.

The species is able to tolerate salinity to some extent. They tolerate 25% natural sea-water (25 parts of sea-water diluted with 75 parts of distilled water) but do not live for more than a week when the salinity goes up to the strength of 35% natural sea-water (sea water itself being about 32 parts per thousand). Their tadpoles are thought to feed on algae. A ciliate in the genus Cepedea has been recorded living in tadpoles of this species.

== Young ==
The tadpoles of this species are highly aggressive. Under experimental conditions, they have been observed killing and eating tadpoles of other species.

== Relationship to humans ==
Human beings in India and Bangladesh have been known to catch this frog for consumption, though this practice has declined in India since the 1990s.

== Threats ==
The IUCN classifies this frog as least concern of extinction. What threat it faces comes from habitat loss and road fatalities. Scientists suspect that overconsumption by humans may also be an issue, but this has yet to be confirmed.
