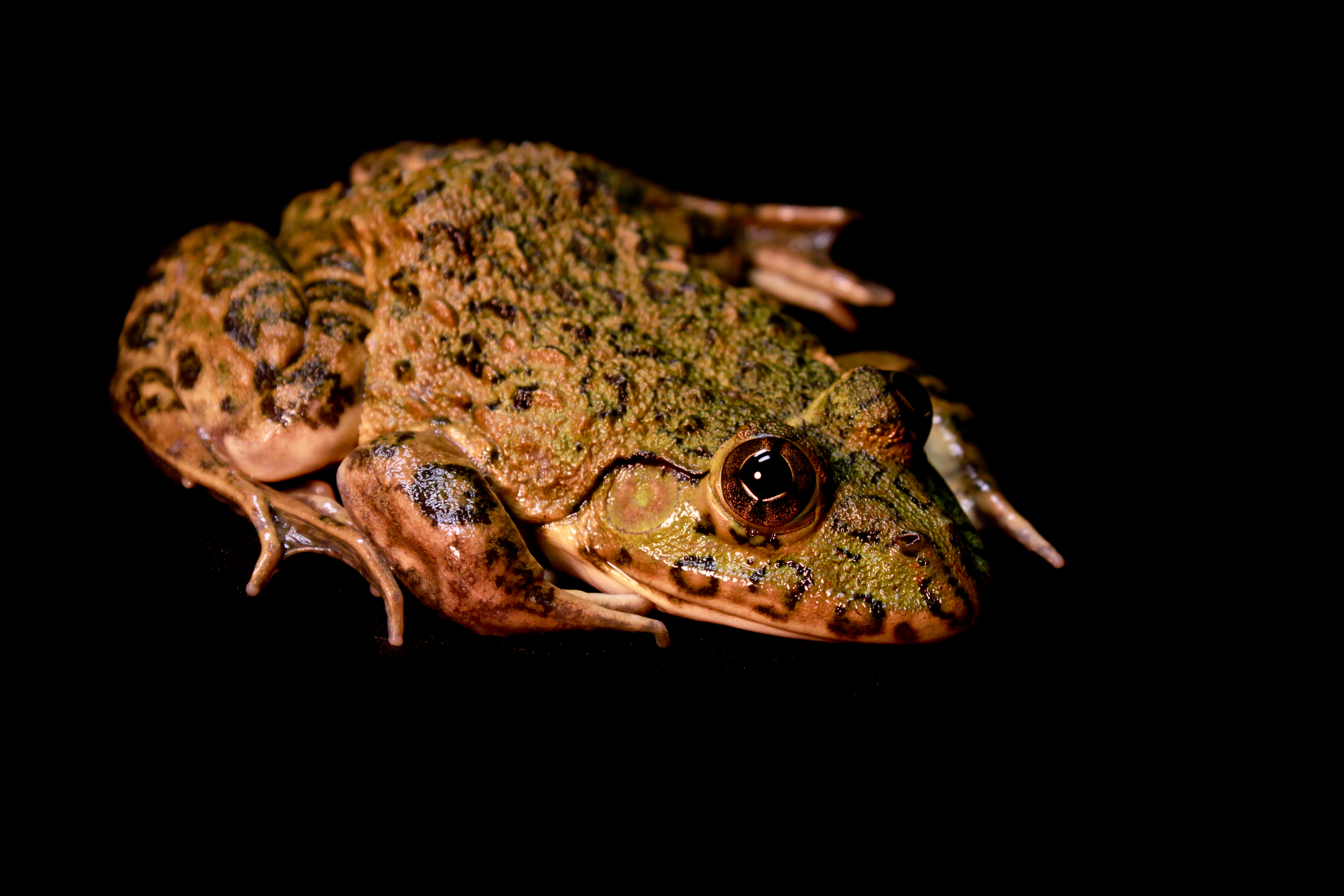

Conservation status
- Least Concern (IUCN 3.1)

Scientific classification
- Kingdom: Animalia
- Phylum: Chordata
- Class: Amphibia
- Order: Anura
- Family: Dicroglossidae
- Genus: Hoplobatrachus
- Species: H. occipitalis

Binomial name
- Hoplobatrachus occipitalis (Günther, 1858)

= Crowned bullfrog =

Species of frog

The crowned bullfrog (Hoplobatrachus occipitalis) is a species of frog in the family Dicroglossidae. It is found in the Sub-Saharan Africa (Algeria, Angola, Benin, Burkina Faso, Burundi, Cameroon, Central African Republic, Chad, Republic of the Congo, Democratic Republic of the Congo, Ivory Coast, Equatorial Guinea, Ethiopia, Gabon, Gambia, Ghana, Guinea, Guinea-Bissau, Kenya, Liberia, Libya, Mali, Mauritania, Morocco, Niger, Nigeria, Rwanda, Senegal, Sierra Leone, Sudan, Tanzania, Togo, Uganda, Western Sahara, and Zambia). Its natural habitats are subtropical or tropical moist lowland forest, dry savanna, moist savanna, subtropical or tropical dry shrubland, subtropical or tropical moist shrubland, subtropical or tropical dry lowland grassland, subtropical or tropical seasonally wet or flooded lowland grassland, rivers, intermittent rivers, freshwater lakes, intermittent freshwater lakes, freshwater marshes, intermittent freshwater marshes, freshwater springs, arable land, pastureland, rural gardens, heavily degraded former forest, and ponds.

It is threatened by habitat loss.
