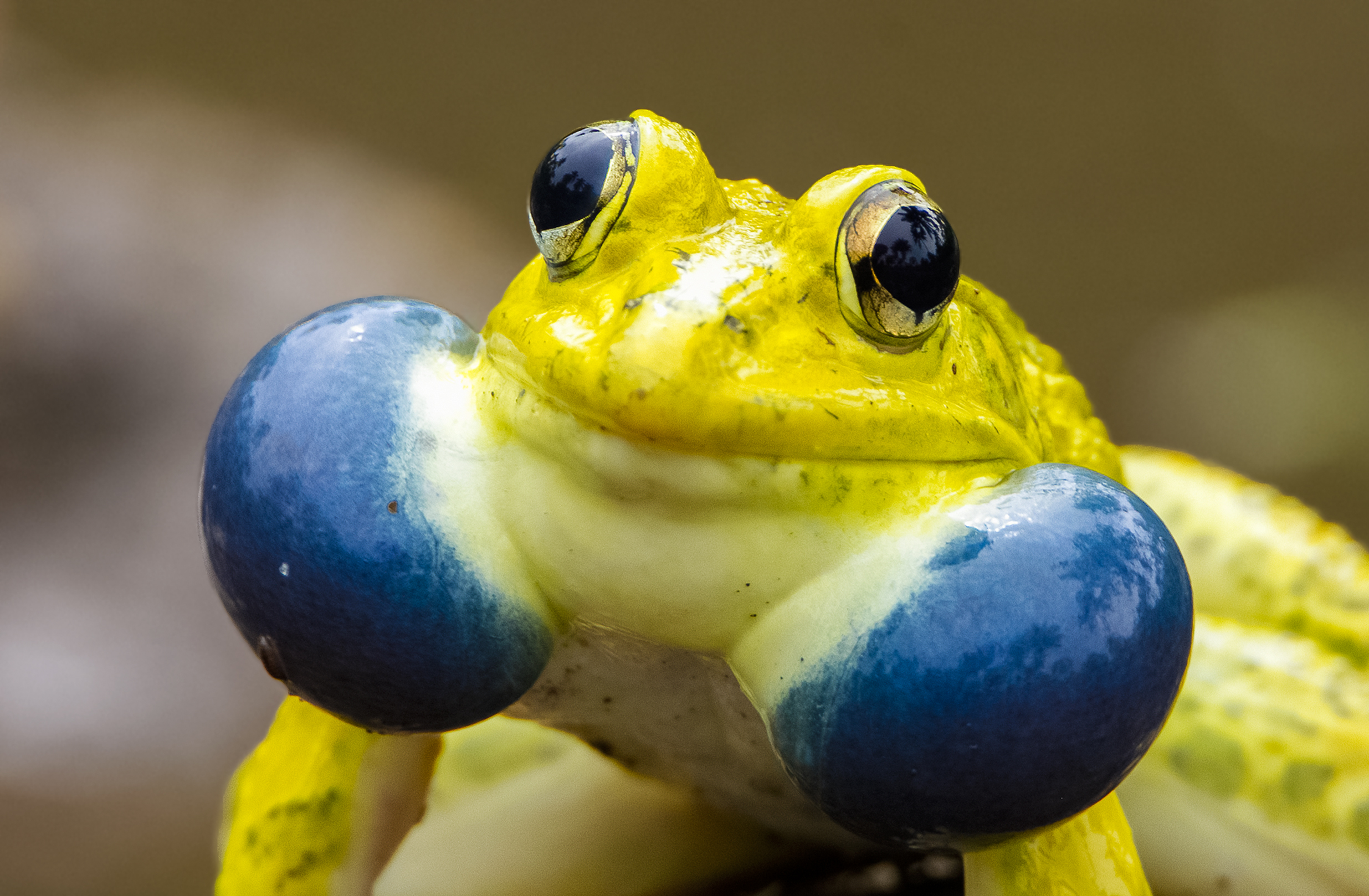
- Breeding male

Conservation status
- Least Concern (IUCN 3.1)
- CITES Appendix II

Scientific classification
- Kingdom: Animalia
- Phylum: Chordata
- Class: Amphibia
- Order: Anura
- Family: Dicroglossidae
- Genus: Hoplobatrachus
- Species: H. tigerinus

Binomial name
- Hoplobatrachus tigerinus (Daudin, 1802)

Synonyms
- Rana tigerina Daudin, 1802; Dicroglossus tigrinus (Daudin, 1802); Euphlyctis tigerina (Daudin, 1802); Limnonectes tigerinus (Daudin, 1802); Rana picta Gravenhorst, 1829; Rana tigerina subsp. tigerina Daudin, 1802; Rana tigrina Daudin, 1802; Rana tigrina Merrem, 1820; Tigrina tigrina (Daudin, 1802)

= Hoplobatrachus tigerinus =

Species of amphibian

Hoplobatrachus tigerinus, commonly known as the Indian bullfrog, is a large species of fork-tongued frog found in South and Southeast Asia. A relatively large frog, it is normally green in color, although physiological traits vary between populations. Sexual dimorphism exists between males and females. Outside of its native range, H. tigerinus is a rapidly-spreading invasive species. Both adults and tadpoles can severely damage the populations of other frog species. Typically, Indian bullfrogs dwell in wetland environments. Research has been conducted on their ability to control mosquitos.

== Taxonomy ==
The Indian bulfrog was first described by François-Marie Daudin in 1802, as Rana tigerina. The type locality was given as "Bengale, India". In 1992, it was transferred to the genus Hoplobatrachus by Alain Dubois, as Hoplobatrachus tigerinus. In addition to various other renditions and misspellings of R. tigerina, other synonyms include Rana picta, Dicroglossus tigrinus, and Euphlyctis tigerina.

== Description ==
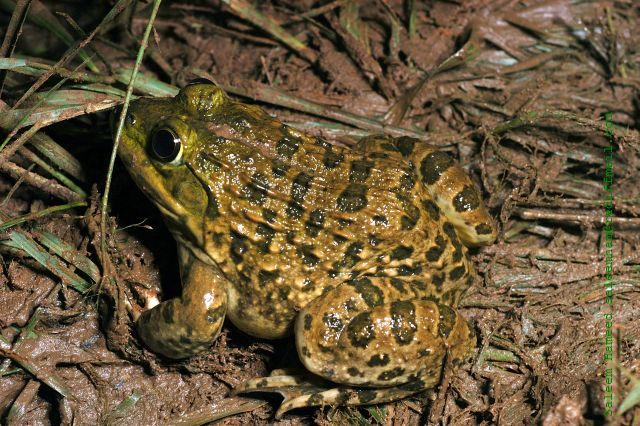
H. tigerinus from Bengaluru

The Indian bullfrog is a large species of frog. They can grow to be 170 millimetres (6.7 in), with heads generally longer than they are wide, although older individuals tend to have wider heads. Normally green or brown with dark spots, males turn yellow during the breeding season. They tend to have a yellow streak along the spinal region of their back.

Significant variation, in both color and size, exists between different populations, even geographically close ones. A 2012 study found that frogs from different villages in the Jamshoro District of Sindh, Pakistan were consistently different in size and coloration from other local populations. The study suggested that this was caused by food and water quality differences, as well as varying ages.

Their hands are unwebbed, while their feet are essentially fully webbed. Males have nuptial pads (swellings present on the forearms of certain male amphibians used to grasp females for mating) on the first finger and dual blue-colored vocal sacs on either side of the throat. The tail and fins of tadpoles are speckled in black, with tail tips darkly colored.

In males, the tympanum is wider than the eye, while in females the eye is wider than the tympanum. Females are also heavier and longer than males.

== Distribution and habitat ==
=== Distribution ===
The Indian bullfrog is native to mainland Afghanistan, Bangladesh, India, Myanmar, Nepal, and Pakistan, as well as possibly Bhutan and China, although its presence is uncertain. It has been introduced to the Maldives, Madagascar, and India's Andaman Islands, where it is now a widespread invasive species. Likely areas to be invaded in the future include Malaysia, Indonesia, the Mascarene Islands, and East Africa.

==== Andaman Islands ====
First reported in October 2011, H. tigerinus has become a major threat to the fauna of the Andaman Islands. Larger than native frogs, it can easily consume large numbers of them, along with reptiles such as the Andaman worm snake and Andaman day gecko, as well as centipedes. The rapid spread of this frog throughout the archipelago is harmful to human residents as well, having disastrous effects on the local economy. The bullfrogs frequently kill and eat residents' fish and chicks, both of which are important to the islanders. While Indian law prohibits their killing, it is still done, both out of desire to rid the islands of the species and for food (H. tigerinus is a very cheap source of protein). Despite these efforts, the frogs' spread continues.

One trait in particular that facilitates this invasion is the carnivorous nature of H. tigerinus tadpoles. Experimentation at the Andaman Nicobar Environment Team (ANET) field station on South Andaman Island demonstrated that when kept together in pools with adequate amounts of food, Indian bullfrogs rapidly devoured the tadpoles of native species. This behavior did not appear to increase their growth rate, the time it took to metamorphosize, or adult size. They consumed other tadpoles so quickly that no competitive behavior could be observed between different species. Even when kept only with their own kind, their aggression towards other tadpoles remained, with only three surviving per pool on average (for comparison, when kept without bullfrogs, native tadpoles—of the species Microhyla chakrapanii and Kaloula ghoshi—lived to metamorphosis three out of four times, on average). It is likely that the frog will eventually reach the Nicobar Islands.

==== Madagascar ====
The species was first introduced to Madagascar for food, for which it is still used, although it has now become a pest. Human consumption has not been enough to prevent its spread.

=== Habitat ===
Hoplobatrachus tigerinus is typically found in freshwater environments, especially wetlands, such as paddy fields. It is not generally found in other ecosystems, such as forests and coastal areas.

== Behavior and ecology ==
Hoplobatrachus tigerinus (Indian bullfrog) at Kasaragod, Kerala

=== Diet ===
Adult Indian bullfrogs eat invertebrates, small mammals, and birds. Tadpoles are known to consume mosquito larvae, including those of the species Aedes aegypti and Culex quinquefasciatus.

=== Reproduction and life cycle ===
Hoplobatrachus tigerinus reproduce during the monsoon season, in pools of rainwater. They produce many eggs at one time, although many tadpoles die before reaching adulthood. They can live over seven years in the wild.

== Research ==
The Indian bullfrog has been found to be an efficient means of controlling mosquito populations. Silver nanoparticles (AgNP), which are highly toxic to the larvae of Aedes aegypti (the yellow fever mosquito), were found to be able to work in conjunction with Hoplobatrachus tigerinus tadpoles to exterminate large numbers of mosquito larvae, with tadpoles consuming more AgNP exposed larvae than non-exposed ones. While AgNP did not cause any immediate harm to the tadpoles, potential long-term side effects (such as changes in life expectancy) have yet to be studied.

== See also ==
- American bullfrog
- Hoplobatrachus litoralis
