= Calabresi's bullfrog =

Conservation status
- Least Concern (IUCN 3.1)

Scientific classification
- Kingdom: Animalia
- Phylum: Chordata
- Class: Amphibia
- Order: Anura
- Family: Pyxicephalidae
- Genus: Pyxicephalus
- Species: P. obbianus

Binomial name
- Pyxicephalus obbianus Calabresi, 1927

Synonyms
- Rana (Pyxicephalus) cimmarutai Scortecci, 1932; Rana (Pyxicephalus) obbiana (Calabresi, 1927)

Species of amphibian

Calabresi's bullfrog (Pyxicephalus obbianus) is a species of frogs in the family Pyxicephalidae. It is endemic to northeastern and central Somalia.

This uncommon species breeds in temporary ponds. Outside the breeding season, it is fossorial, and little is known about its habitat. It is assumed live in dry savannah and semi-arid habitats. Significant threats to it are unlikely, although livestock grazing, and perhaps fire and droughts, might have an impact.
