= Cane toads (disambiguation) =

Cane toads may refer to:

- Cane toad
- Cane toads in Australia
- Cane Toads: An Unnatural History 1988 documentary film
- Cane Toads: The Conquest 2010 documentary film
- The Cane Toad Times Australian satirical magazine
- a nickname for the Queensland rugby league team
