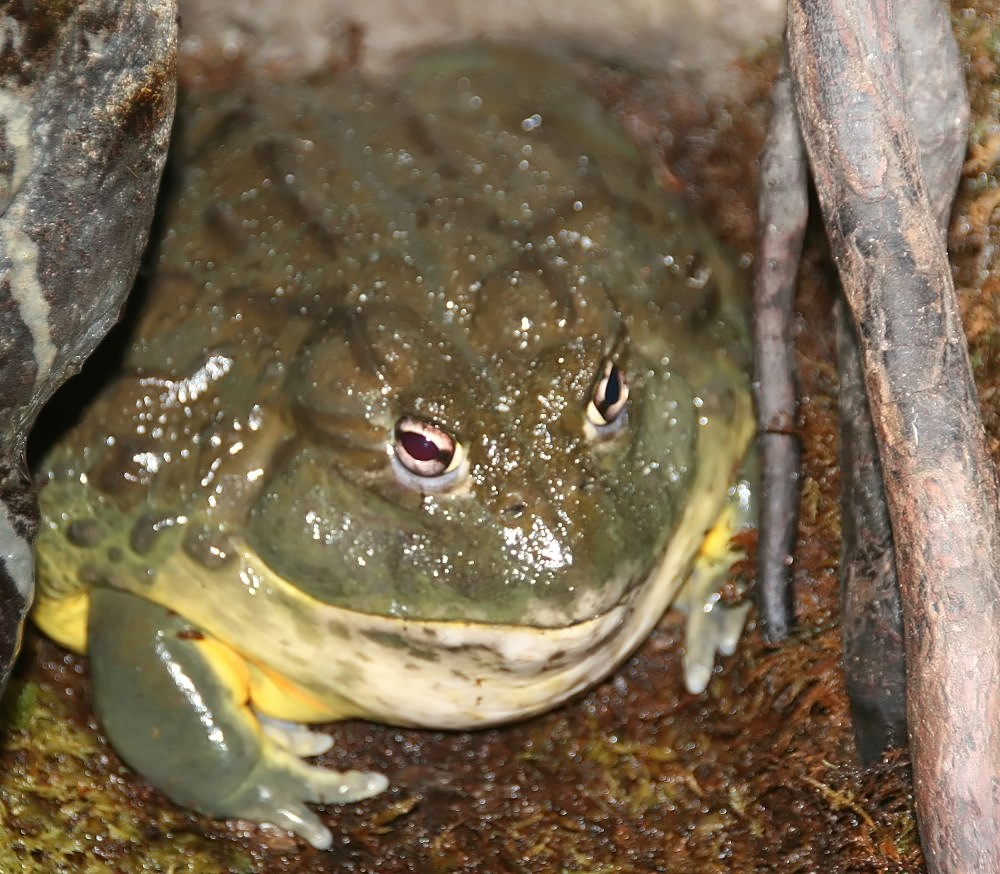

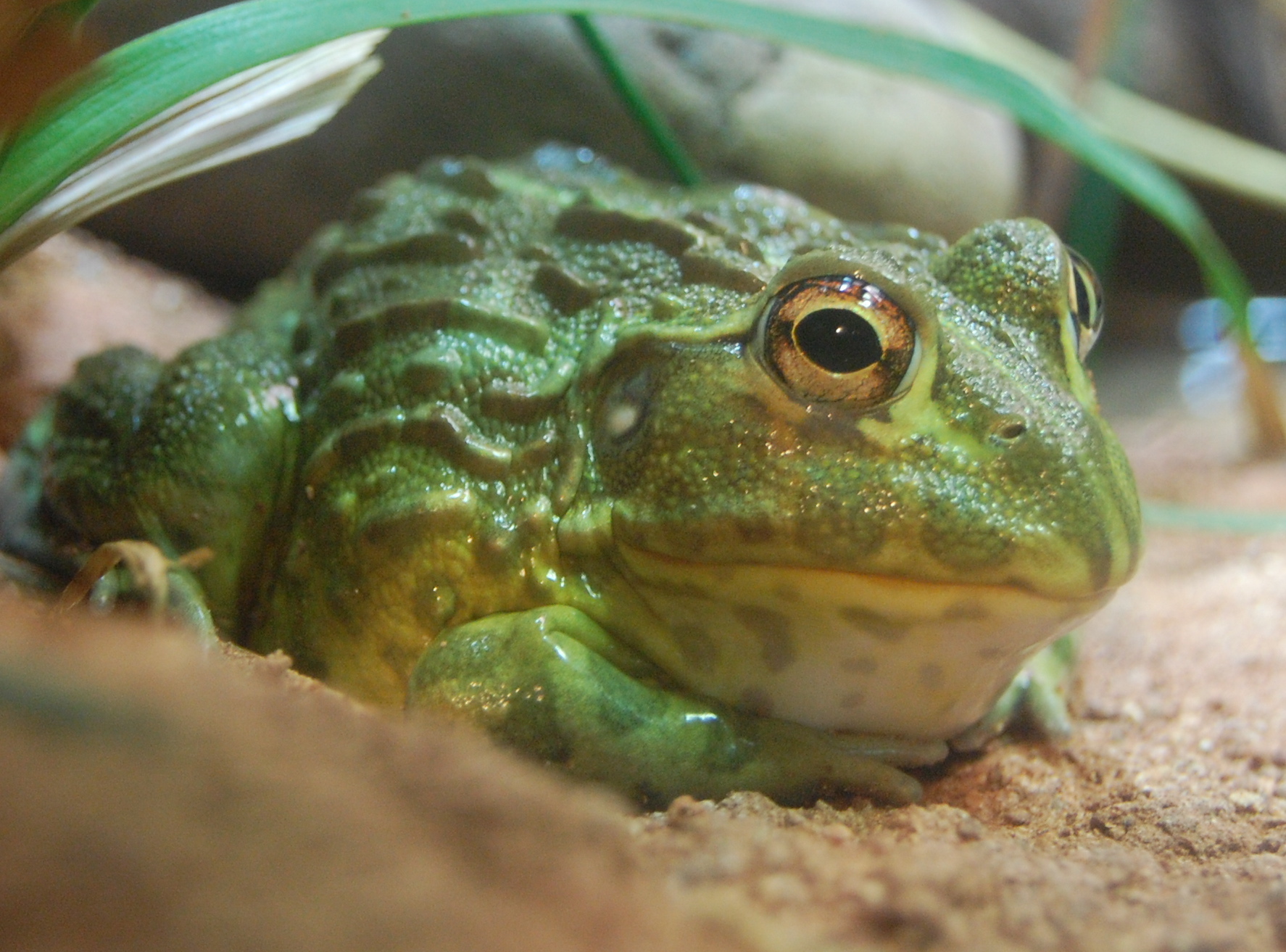

Conservation status
- Least Concern (IUCN 3.1)

Scientific classification
- Kingdom: Animalia
- Phylum: Chordata
- Class: Amphibia
- Order: Anura
- Family: Pyxicephalidae
- Genus: Pyxicephalus
- Species: P. adspersus

Binomial name
- Pyxicephalus adspersus Tschudi, 1838
- African bullfrog distribution Extant (resident)

= African bullfrog =

Species of frog

The African bullfrog (Pyxicephalus adspersus), also known as the giant bullfrog or the South African burrowing frog, is a species of frog in the family Pyxicephalidae. It is also known as the pixie frog due to its scientific name. It is found in Angola, Botswana, Kenya, Malawi, Mozambique, Namibia, South Africa, Tanzania, Uganda, Zambia, Zimbabwe, and possibly the Democratic Republic of the Congo. It has been extirpated from Eswatini. It has long been confused with the edible bullfrog (P. edulis), and species boundaries between them, including exact range limits, are not fully understood. Additionally, P. angusticeps of coastal East Africa only was revalidated as a separate species in 2013.

The natural habitat of the African bullfrog is moist to dry savanna, subtropical to tropical dry shrubland, intermittent freshwater lakes, intermittent freshwater marshes, arable land, pastureland, canals, and flooded ditches. It is among the largest anurans on the planet, sixth only to the goliath frog, the helmeted water toad, the Lake Junin frog, Blyth's river frog, and the cane toad.

== Appearance ==
The males weigh up to 1.4 kg (3.1 lb) and grow to 24.5 cm (9.6 in) in snout–to–vent length. Females are half the size of males, which is unusual, considering that most female amphibians are (generally) larger than males, to help the amplexus. The dorsum is dark olive-green in adults. Juveniles have bright green coloration with a yellow stripe down the back. The abdomen is white to creamy-yellow with breeding males having yellow forelimbs.

== Feeding and habits ==
The African bullfrog is a voracious carnivore, eating insects and other invertebrates, small rodents, reptiles, small birds, fish, and other amphibians that can fit in their mouths. It is also a cannibalistic species—the male African bullfrog is known for occasionally eating the tadpoles he guards, and juveniles also eat tadpoles. An African bullfrog kept at the Pretoria Zoo in South Africa once ate 17 juvenile Rinkhals snakes (Hemachatus haemachatus).

When exposed to dry conditions, they become dormant and may form a cocoon which covers the entire body surface except the external nostrils. The cocoon significantly decreases the rate of evaporative water loss. When it rains, the water softens the cocoon and the frog crawls out.

== Reproduction ==
Breeding typically starts after about 65 mm (2.6 in) of rain over the course of two days. They breed in shallow, temporary water bodies, such as pools, pans, and ditches. Eggs are laid in the shallow edge of the pond, but fertilization takes place above water.

The African bullfrog males call out during the rainy season. The call lasts about a second and can be described as a low-pitched whoop. Males have two breeding strategies, depending on their age. Young males congregate in a small area, perhaps only 1–2 m^{2} (11–22 sq ft) of shallow water. The larger males occupy the centre of these breeding arenas or leks, and attempt to chase off other males. Often, they fight, causing injury or even killing one another. The dominant male attempts to prevent other males from breeding. A female approaches the group of males by swimming along at the surface until she is within a few metres of the group. Then, the female dives to avoid the smaller males and surfaces in the defended area of a larger male in the middle of the group. This helps to ensure that she mates with the dominant male.

The female lays about 3,000 to 4,000 eggs at a time. The tadpoles hatch, and after two days, start feeding on vegetation, small fish, invertebrates, and even each other. Defending males continue to watch over the tadpoles, which metamorphose within three weeks. During the tadpole's development, the father guards his young. Due to the male bullfrog's overprotective behaviour, he pounces and bites anything that he views as a threat. If the pool is in danger of drying out, the father uses his legs and head to dig a canal from the drying pond to a bigger pond. He continues to guard the tadpoles until they are old enough to fend for themselves, although he may also eat some of them.

== Status ==
The African bullfrog is listed as "least concern" globally. Before 2013, it was considered "near threatened" in South Africa due to habitat loss. However, conservation initiatives, such as habitat restoration, awareness campaigns, and legal protections, have been instrumental in reversing this trend, resulting in its reclassification to "least concern" in July 2013.

== Human use ==
The African bullfrog is an exotic pet in many countries around the world. Animals sold are generally bred in captivity. Pet African bullfrogs may live for 35 years in captivity. As pets, African bullfrogs are considered to be easygoing and low-maintenance in terms of their care.

It is considered a delicacy in Namibia.

== Gallery ==
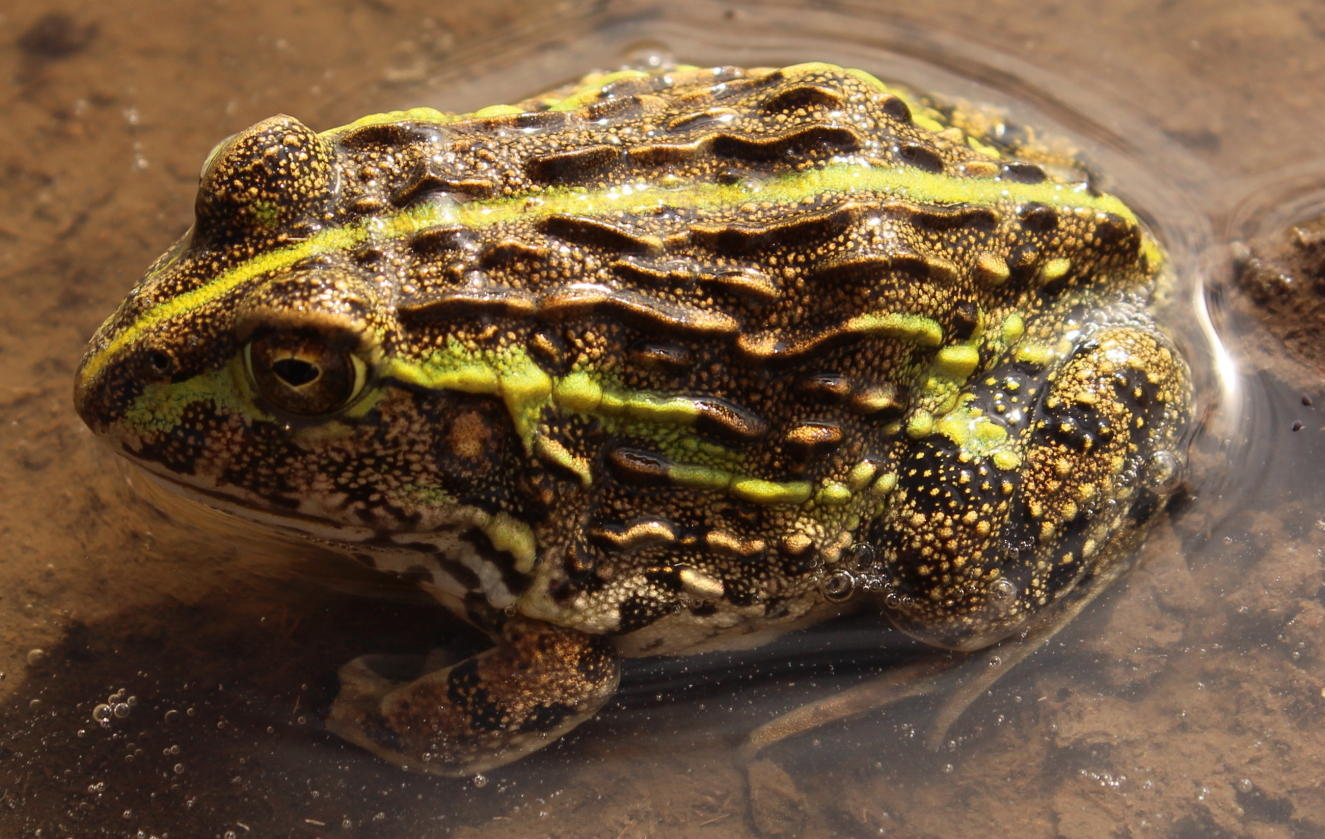

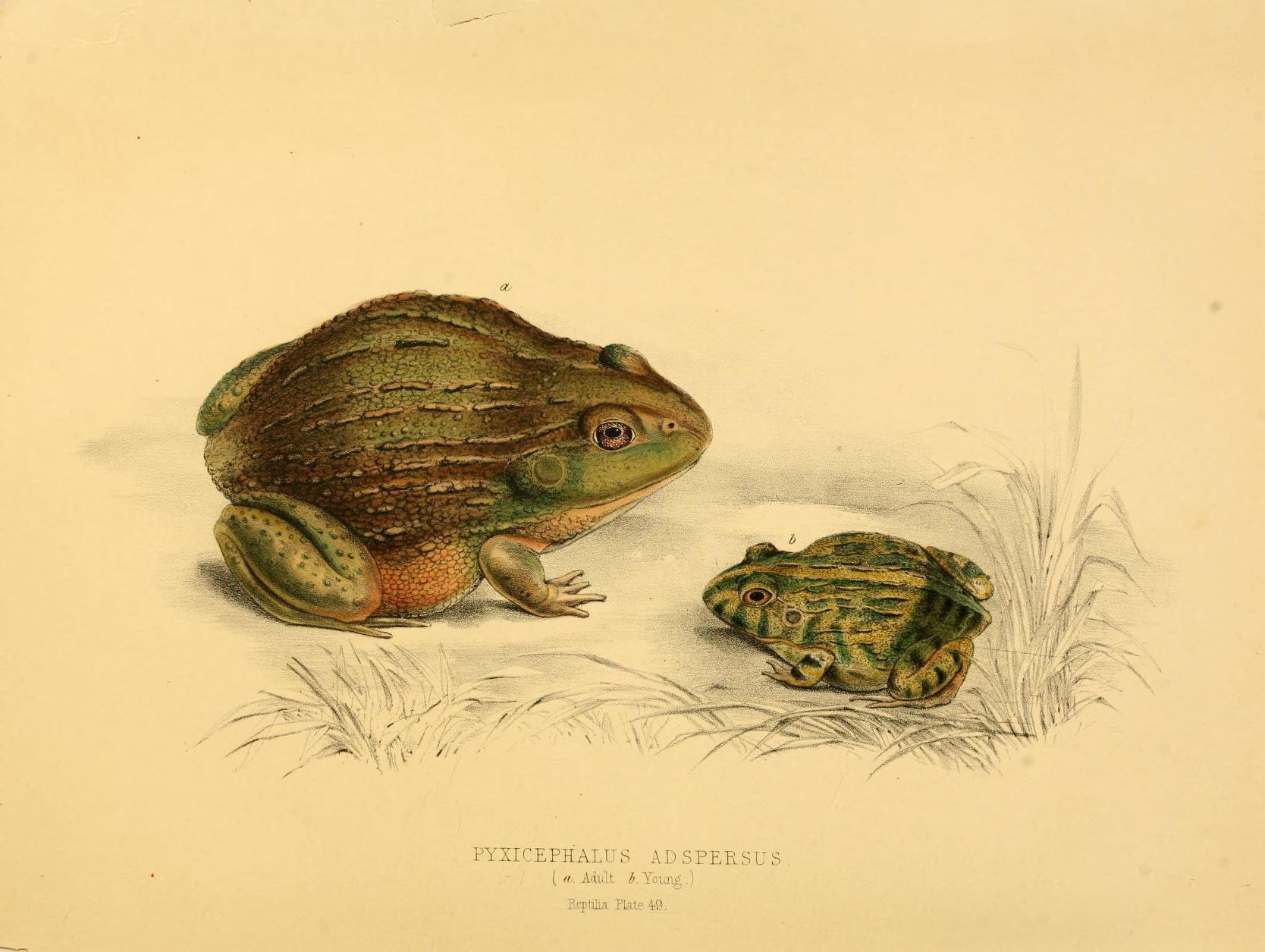
Adult and juvenile
