= Blanche Deyo =

American actress

Blanche Lillian Deyo
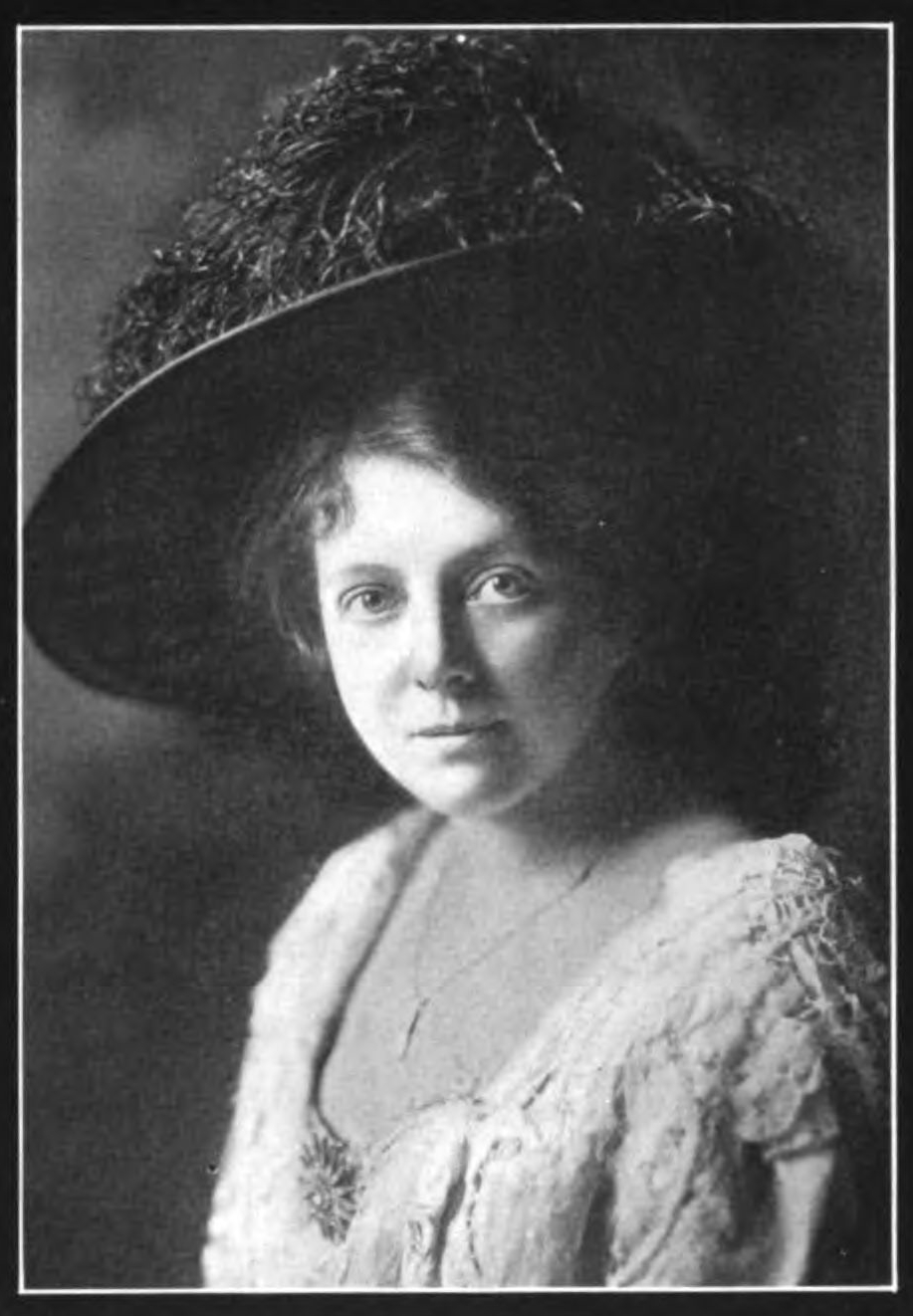
- Born: Blanche Lillian Pixley; June 6, 1878; San Francisco, California
- Died: August 30, 1933 (aged 54–55)
- Occupations: Dancer, Actress, Singer
- Spouse: Walter Jones (m. 1908; died 1922)
- Children: 1

Blanche Lillian Deyo (née Pixley, June 6, 1878 – August 29, 1933) was an American dancer, actress, and singer who performed in multiple theatrical venues -- Broadway, vaudeville, burlesque, ballet, and international variety theaters—throughout the late nineteenth and early twentieth centuries.

== Family ==
Deyo's mother was Lillian Scott and her father was Robert "Bob" Franklin Pixley, a mining engineer from Canada, who died in San Francisco, California on February 24, 1908. She had two sisters, Pearl (1873–1950) and the actress Grace (sometimes Grayce) Scott Pixley (1877–1970), who married theater producer and literary agent R. L. "Larry" Giffen (ca. 1873–1946). Deyo's paternal aunt and uncle were successful in show business. Annie Pixley (1856-1893) was a well-known actress; Gus Pixley, a stage comedian.

== Stage career ==
Deyo first appeared on stage in New York in 1895, billed as a discovery of producer Edward E. Rice. She was first known only as "the Beautiful Deyo" or, in Europe, "Mademoiselle Deyo," doing a solo dance act. Beginning in May 1897 she danced in London theaters and thereafter traveled the world. She began using her full name by 1903, having had success in several plays. Deyo appeared as Miss Carruthers in A Country Girl, September–December 1902.

She also appeared as Peggy Sabine in the musical play The Cingalee at Daly's Theatre on Broadway, in October 1904. The musical featured chorus girls with extravagant costumes and splendorous settings with oriental motifs. After appearing as Ozma in The Woggle-Bug (1905), she was signed by Frank L. Perley (agent to Mabel Hite, who also appeared in the show) for a part in The Winning Girl. The play was staged at the Shubert Park Theatre in Brooklyn, New York. Deyo was in a company that presented Mexicana at the Lyric Theatre (New York) in February 1906. The show was produced by Sam S. Shubert. In April she participated in a benefit at the Casino Theatre for victims of the 1906 San Francisco earthquake.

In October 1908, Deyo starred in Joe Weber's version of Salome at the Duquesne Theatre in Pittsburgh, Pennsylvania. The religious subject matter and revealing costumes led to complaints to the Pittsburgh Police Department, and the department's Director of Public Safety unsuccessfully attempted to halt the October 13th performance. Mayor George W. Guthrie intervened, ordering the Chief of Police to inspect Deyo's costume before allowing the October 14th performance to start.

Blanche Ring was the leading lady of The Merry Widow and the Devil which played the Grand Opera House, 23rd Street (Manhattan) (8th Avenue (Manhattan), in November 1908. It was staged by Julian Mitchell with music by Franz Lehár. The cast included Deyo and her husband Walter Jones, as well as Grace Griswold and Joe Weber.

Deyo and comedian Franker Woods toured in The Echo in 1911 after the play had a successful run at the Lunt-Fontanne Theatre (Globe Theatre). The season prior to this she appeared as Paulette Devine in The Blue Mouse.

Theatrical manager Edwin A. Weil owed Deyo $1,692 when he filed for bankruptcy in November 1913.

Deyo was among the actors in All Over Town, the last theatrical production of the 1914-1915 season in Washington, D.C. staged at the Belasco Theatre, when she teamed with Roy Atwell in a "diamond robbery motion picture specialty" in the opening act. Her Charlie Chaplin number, performed with eight members of the chorus, earned her the most applause.

== Private life ==
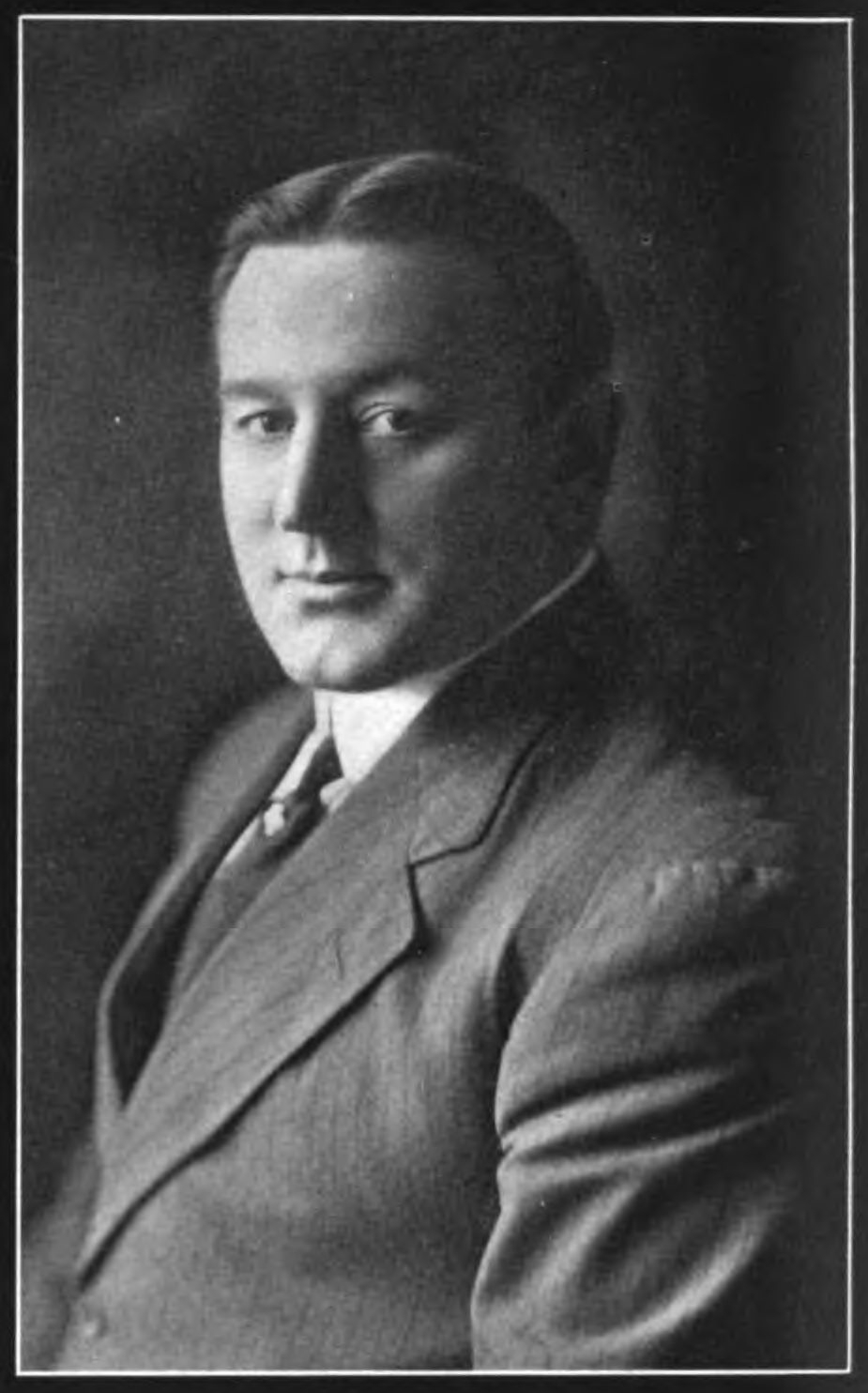
Walter Jones

She married tramp impersonator Walter Jones in Crown Point, Indiana in April 1908. It was her second marriage. Jones had divorced his previous wife, Beatrice, two months earlier, and the divorce decree implied his infidelity with Deyo. Jones and Deyo had a daughter in December 1913, also named Blanche Deyo.

Her hobby was collecting dancing slippers. She began her collection by accident when she obtained a pair owned by Marie Taglion. Deyo filled two glass display cases in her Philadelphia, Pennsylvania home with slippers worn by famous dancers.

== Death ==
Blanche Deyo Jones died on August 29, 1933.
