= Walter McDougall =

Walter McDougal may refer to:

- Walter A. McDougall (born 1946), American historian
- Walt McDougall (1858–1938), American cartoonist
