= Woggle-Bug =

- Oz character
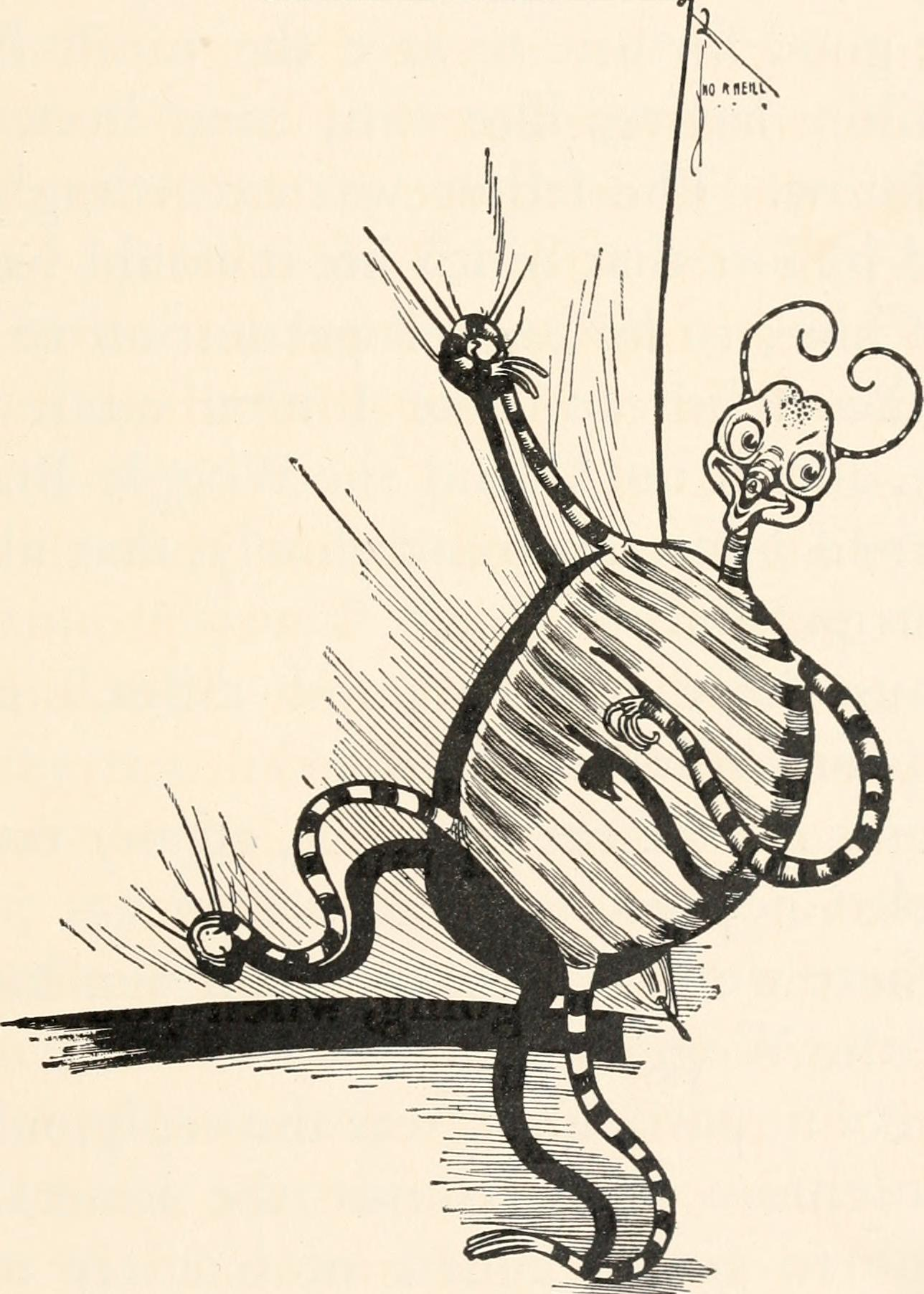
- The Woggle-Bug as illustrated by John R. Neill
- First appearance: The Marvelous Land of Oz (1904)
- Created by: L. Frank Baum

In-universe information
- Species: Insect
- Gender: Male
- Title(s): Mr. H.M. Woggle-Bug, T.E.
- Occupation: Professor
- Religion: None
- Nationality: Winkie?

Mr. Highly Magnified Woggle-Bug, Thoroughly Educated is a character in the Oz books by L. Frank Baum (1856–1919). The character first appeared in 1904 in the book The Marvelous Land of Oz. He goes by the name H. M. Woggle-Bug, T.E. (Highly Magnified and Thoroughly Educated). In later books, the hyphen was sometimes dropped: "Wogglebug".

In illustrations, he is often depicted wearing bright colors and several pairs of glasses on his elongated proboscis.

== History ==
According to The Marvelous Land of Oz, the Woggle-Bug was once a regular tiny woggle-bug, about the size of a pea. He lived the life of a normal insect until he crawled into a country schoolhouse (presumably somewhere in the Winkie Country of the Land of Oz) and listened to the lessons and lectures which the famous Professor Nowitall gave his pupils for about three years. One day the teacher found and caught him, and decided to use him for an impromptu lesson on woggle-bugs. Nowitall put the bug under a microscope and projected his highly magnified image onto a screen with advanced technology. The bug was proud of his new size; he bowed to the students, and one unnamed little girl standing on the windowsill was startled and fell backward out of the window. While everyone rushed outside to see if she was all right, the bug secretly jumped off the screen and ran away. He has remained magnified ever since. Later he found a tailor, and after he saved the tailor's life in an unknown way (although a few stories have been written to explain how, including The Wogglebug's New Clothes in the 1987 Oziana), the tailor made him his very first clothes.

He later founded and runs the Royal College of Art and Athletic Perfection, also known as the Royal College of Athletic Arts or the Royal College of Athletic Sciences, which is located in the western part of the Munchkin Country, not far from the Emerald City.

In Dorothy and the Wizard in Oz, Woggle-Bug appears as the prosecutor in Princess Ozma's court.

In The Road to Oz, Woggle-Bug is among the guests at Princess Ozma's birthday party.

== Personality ==
When the Woggle-bug is first introduced in The Marvelous Land of Oz, he is portrayed as having a charming disposition and a quirky and somewhat eccentric personality. He has a love of big words, Latin phrases, philosophy, and colorful puns relating to his immediate situation ("Were I to ride upon this sawhorse he would not only be an animal, he would become an equipage for he would then be a horse and buggy"). These puns cause his companions a great deal of distress, in response to the aforementioned pun, "[T]he Scarecrow gave a gasp and the Tin Woodman stopped short and looked reproachfully at the Woggle-Bug. At the same time the Sawhorse loudly snorted in derision; and even the Pumpkinhead put up his hand to hide the smile, which because it was carved upon his face, he could not change to a frown." Puns have been regarded as a sign of superior education and Baum uses the Woggle-Bug's puns repeatedly to highlight his conceitedness regarding his own education. Later the Tinman even threatens to murder the Woggle-Bug if he does not stop using his puns to show off. He is very proud of his education, and wants to put it to good use. He is always courteous and polite whatever the situation, and clearly cares about the well-being of others. In the Sunday comics series through the following year, the Woggle-Bug is depicted as leading his companions out of trouble, displaying his wisdom, and also doing random acts of kindness for the poor citizens of America.

The Woggle-Bug, like many of Baum's characters, contains many contradictions. He is polite, kind, and courtly while also at times being conceited and uncaring.

When he next appears in Dorothy and the Wizard in Oz as the prosecutor in Ozma's court, Baum seemingly decided to portray him as more pompous and arrogant, and decidedly unlikeable. Baum was using him as a mocking of arrogance found in scholars (and also lawyers).

The Emerald City of Oz features Dorothy, Aunt Em and Uncle Henry paying a visit to the Woggle-Bug at his academy. In the continuing Oz series, the Professor goes on no more adventures until the last of Baum's books, Glinda of Oz, in which he is given a very harsh description as being so conceited no one cares to associate with him. He is no one's favorite in spite of his famous college of athletics. When Ruth Plumly Thompson took over the series after Baum's death, she portrayed him exactly like this. When he sets into motion the plot of The Royal Book of Oz, he accuses the Scarecrow of lacking any ancestry for him to list in the Royal Genealogy. Authors have portrayed him in varying ways ever since, sometimes lovable as he was originally, and sometimes extremely arrogant, and sometimes as just well-meaningly lofty.

The Professor has a significant role in John R. Neill's The Runaway in Oz.

== In other media ==
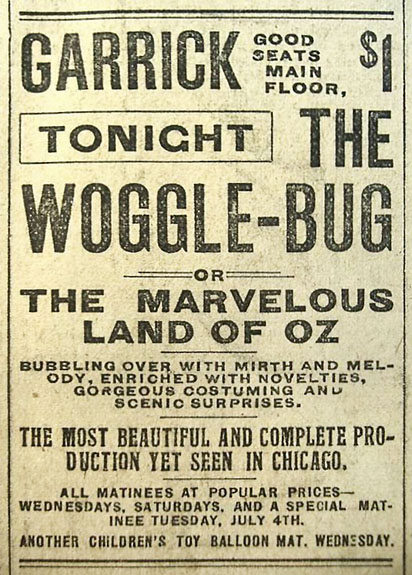
1905 advertisement in the Chicago Record Herald

- To promote his new book The Marvelous Land of Oz, Baum wrote a series of short stories called Queer Visitors from the Marvelous Land of Oz, with comics illustrations by Walt McDougall. These stories were syndicated to newspapers across the country, and appeared in the children's page of the Sunday comics. The stories ran from 28 August 1904 through 26 February 1905. The first seventeen of them ended with a bit of missing information and the question, "What did the Woggle-bug say?" One of the characters would ask the Woggle-Bug a question, and readers were invited to guess the answer for a prize. The correct answer was given the following Sunday. Much publicity surrounded the contest including sheet music, pin-back buttons, postcards, games, and more.
- Following the success of The Marvelous Land of Oz, Baum wrote a stage musical loosely based on the story; he hoped to recreate the smash hit of the 1902 musical stage adaption of The Wizard of Oz. The new musical was called The Woggle-Bug and featured 26-year-old Fred Mace (who later became a star of Mack Sennett comedies) played the Woggle-bug, singing such songs as "Mr. H. M. Woggle-bug, T.E." and "There's a Lady Bug Awaiting for me", and Sydney Deane, who would become the first Australian to appear in a Hollywood movie. In the play, the Woggle-Bug initially sides with Mombi and General Jinjur's Army of Revolt, but falls in with the heroes when he flees from the Army's charge and is taken prisoner. The play opened and closed in Chicago. It had many elements of comedy absent from the book; in the play, the Woggle-Bug has a passion for a dress made of a bright Wagnerian plaid and he instantly falls in love with whoever wears it next. It also includes a "colored" (probably blackface) cook named Dinah and has Professor Knowitt [sic] as the male love interest with Prissy Pring, a lieutenant in General Jinjur's army, as his female counterpart. The show received a few kind reviews but ultimately it "ceased to woggle," as one critique put it. It closed in less than a month.
- The play was also adapted as a short book, The Woggle-Bug Book.
- The "wogglebugs" ("wogs") of Philip José Farmer's celebrated 1952 science fiction novella The Lovers are extraterrestrials that resemble Baum's character.
- The Woggle-Bug is a supporting character in Dorothy and the Wizard of Oz, voiced by J. P. Karliak with an Austrian accent. In this show, he wrote a book called "The Great Rulers of Oz."
