= Salus-Grady libel law =

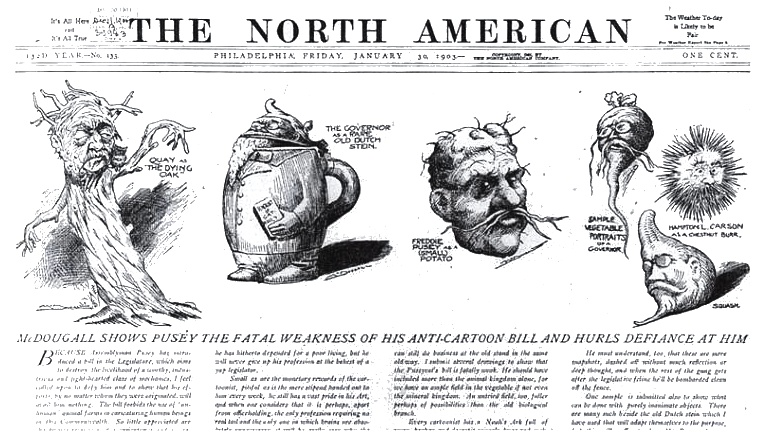
The law's supporters satirically portrayed as inanimate objects by Walt McDougall

The Salus-Grady libel law, also known as the Pennsylvania anti-cartoon law, was enacted by the Commonwealth of Pennsylvania in 1903 to discourage political criticism from the press. Governor Samuel W. Pennypacker championed the controversial law in response to an ongoing set of cartoons that mocked his successful 1902 gubernatorial campaign and his tenure as governor. Upset by being caricatured as a parrot, Pennypacker denounced what he deemed "the sensational devices and the disregard of truth" employed by the press. The law broadened the circumstances under which a newspaper could be sued for libel, and made editors liable in their personal capacity to such lawsuits. Rather than having the chilling effect Pennypacker desired, the law backfired spectacularly. Charles Nelan and other artists drew cartoons more contemptuous than the previous ones, and nationally circulating newspapers joined the Pennsylvanian newspapers in protesting against the law. The law languished along with Pennypacker when he stepped down from office in 1907, as his successor quickly repealed the controversial measure.

== Background ==
The start of the 20th century coincided with an increasingly vocal press and journalists who targeted their subjects with editorial cartoons and investigative reports. Feeling threatened, politicians in several states proposed laws that would place restrictions upon these unflattering images. The conflict between journalist and political figure would come to a head in Pennsylvania when the Republican Party nominated Samuel W. Pennypacker, then a sitting judge in Philadelphia, for the office of governor. Pennypacker's short temper and arrogance made him an easy target. Although he was perceived as an honest judge, Pennypacker refused to acknowledge the corruption present in Pennsylvania's political environment, declaring that the government had "no ills that are worthy of mention." Pennypacker strongly defended the party boss, Matthew S. Quay, and attributed his nomination not to Quay's behind-the-scenes maneuvering, but to the strength of his own record as a judge. He saw his own nomination as an unprecedented achievement of honest politics.

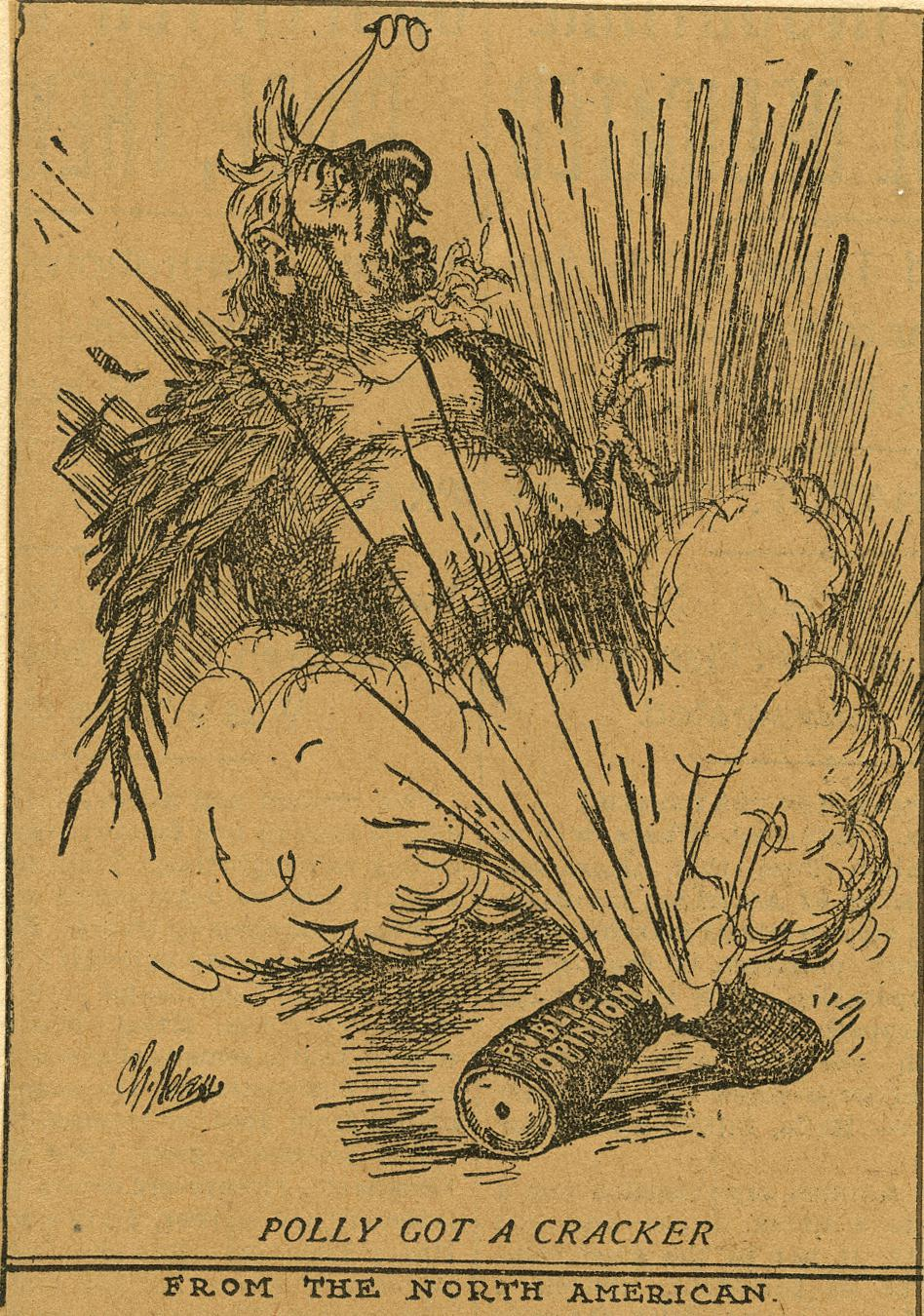
"Polly Got a Cracker" (May 16, 1903): Nelan depicts Pennypacker as a parrot, startled by an exploding firecracker of "public opinion."

Charles Nelan, a cartoonist working for the anti-Quay North American newspaper out of Philadelphia, capitalized on the candidate's remarks by drawing him as a conceited parrot. Referencing the parrot's propensity for mimicry, the caricatured bird repeated the words of party elders: metaphorically, Nelan accused Pennypacker of being a rubber stamp for the desires of Quay and his cronies. Later cartoons similarly implied that the judge was tainted by his association with Quay, but Pennypacker won the governor's race anyway. Despite his victory, Pennypacker harbored ill will against the cartoonists, with his inaugural address criticizing "sensational journals" as a "terror to the household, a detriment to the public service, and an impediment to the courts of justice."

The Salus-Grady libel law was preceded by an unsuccessful bill introduced by Frederick Taylor Pusey to ban "any cartoon or caricature or picture portraying, describing or representing any person, either by distortion, innuendo or otherwise, in the form or likeness of beast, bird, fish, insect, or other unhuman animal, thereby tending to expose such person to public hatred, contempt, or ridicule." But the legislators did not count on the ingenuity of the cartoonists who immediately began ridiculing Governor Pennypacker and other officials with caricatures in the guise of vegetables and inanimate objects. Politicians were depicted as turnips, trees, chestnut burrs, squash, beer steins, and other non-animal forms. Philadelphia's North American newspaper proposed a new coat of arms for Pennsylvania featuring an impaled cartoonist's head, a gag and muzzle, a dwarf on a stool, a pussy cat, and a jackass in knee-high boots. State representative Samuel W. Salus and state senator John C. Grady took a different approach, proposing that newspaper editors be made liable in their personal capacity to libel lawsuits, and their bill was passed. The law was never enforced, and Pennypacker was hounded for his entire term as governor by critical cartoons. After his predecessor's term was finished, the new administration of Governor Edwin Sydney Stuart swiftly rescinded the law.

== See also ==
- Censorship in the United States
