= John Alexander McDougall (artist) =

American painter

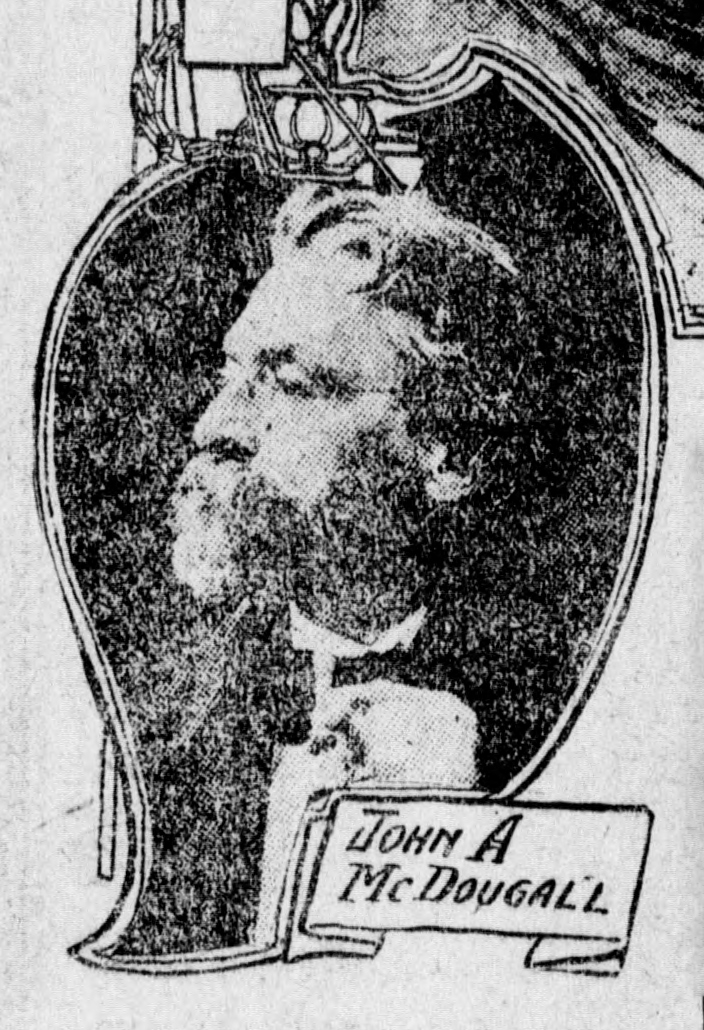

John Alexander McDougall (c.1810–1894) (Note: One contemporary obituary lists his birth date as February 12, 1812, yet his obituary in the New York Evening World the day after his death states he was born "eighty-seven years ago". More recent biographical entries list his birth date as c. 1810 or "1810/11".) was an American painter and photographer, known for his portrait miniatures. Born in Livingston, New Jersey, he studied at the National Academy of Design in New York City, and lived for much of his life in Newark, New Jersey. McDougall was good friends with painters George Inness and Asher B. Durand, as well as writers Washington Irving and Edgar Allan Poe, whom he painted. His miniatures, some of which were unusually small, are found in the permanent collections of the Metropolitan Museum of Art and the Smithsonian American Art Museum. He died in Newark on July 29, 1894. He had a daughter and five sons, including the cartoonist Walt McDougall, the artist John A. McDougall Jr. (also a miniaturist), and Harry C. McDougall, proprietor of the Newark Sunday Call.

Gallery

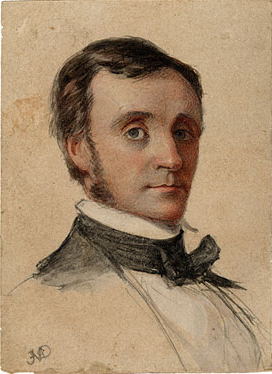
Portrait of Edgar Allan Poe, c. 1846

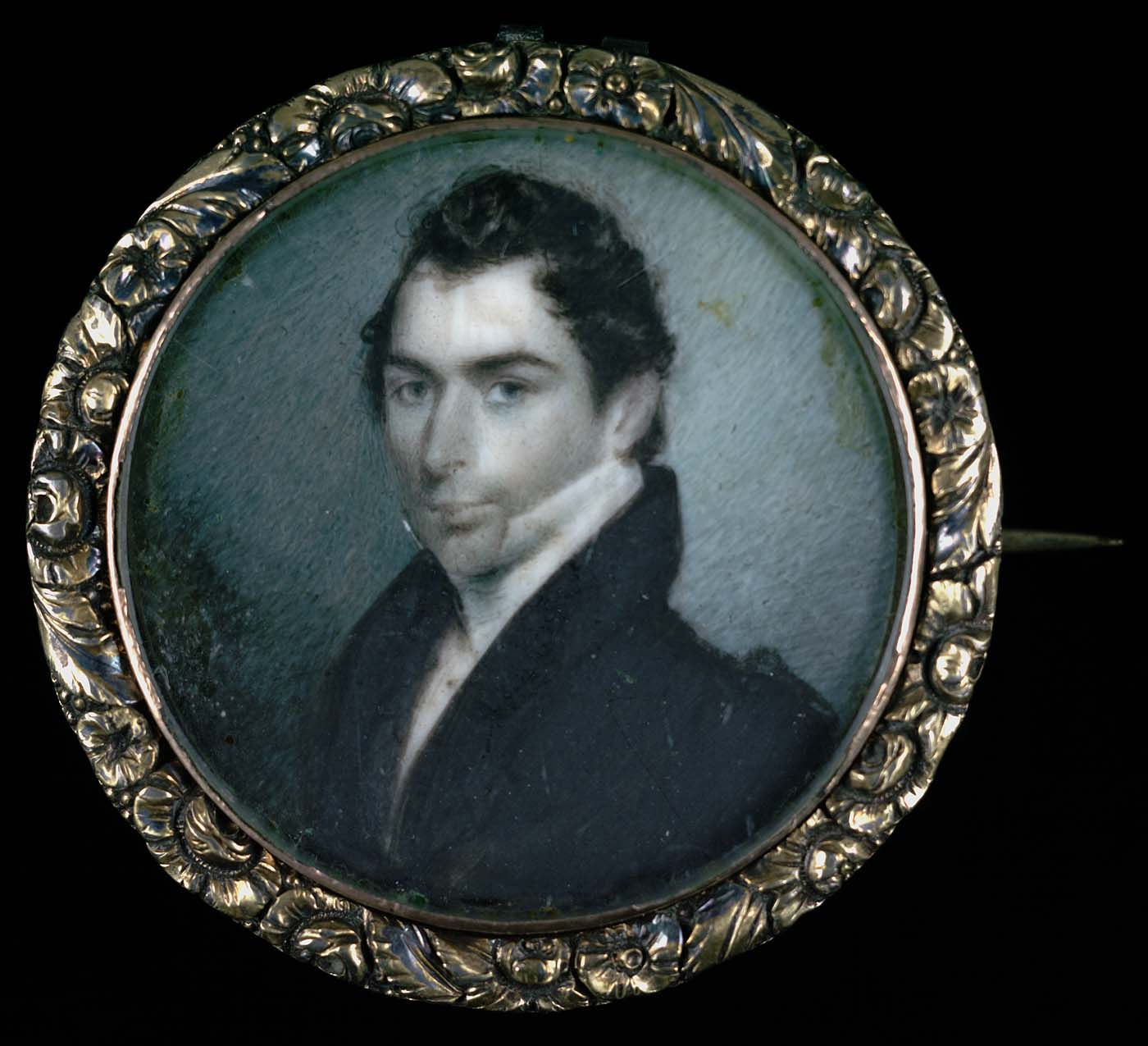
Portrait of a Gentleman (c. 1835)

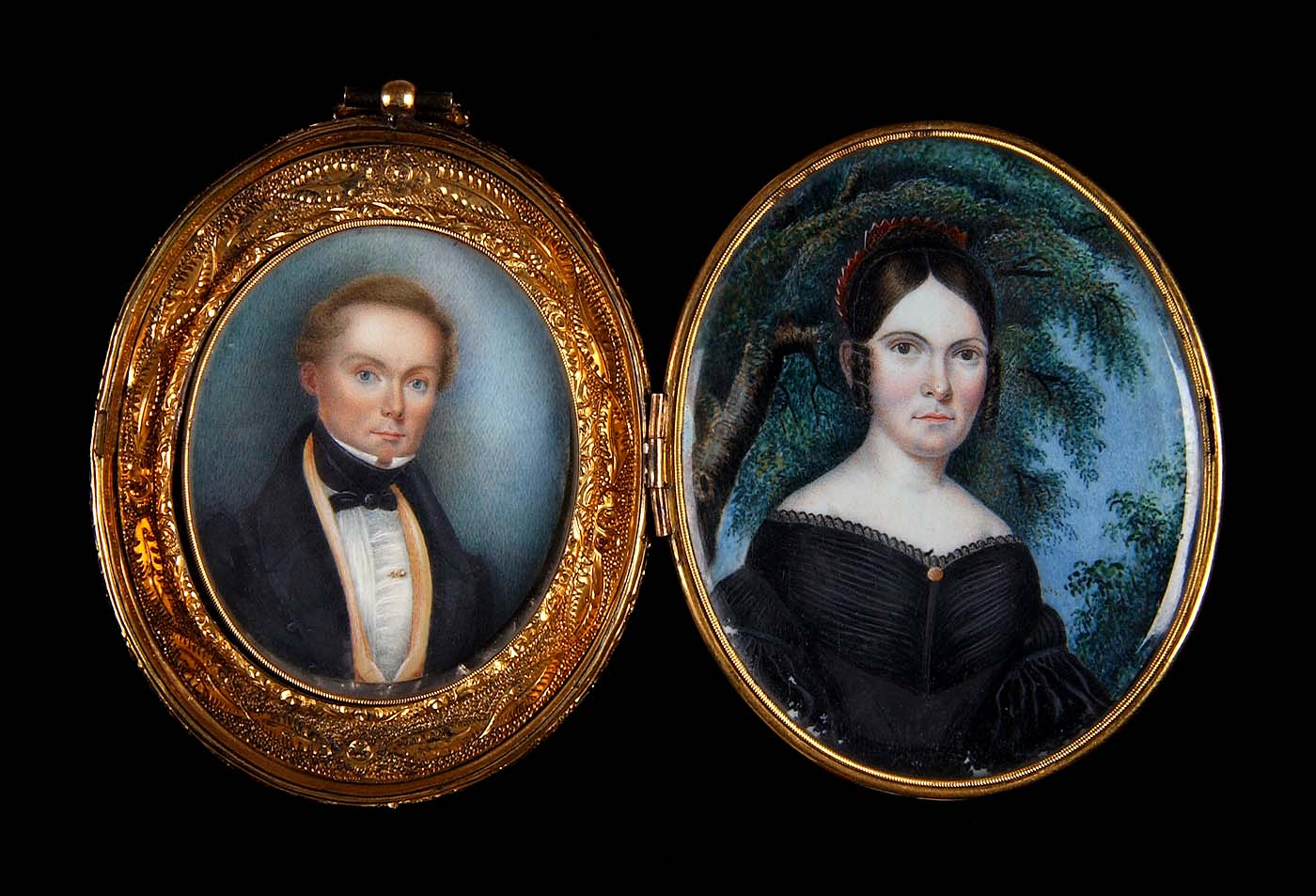
Portraits of a Gentleman and a Lady (1839)
