= Mike Donlin =

American baseball player (1878–1933)

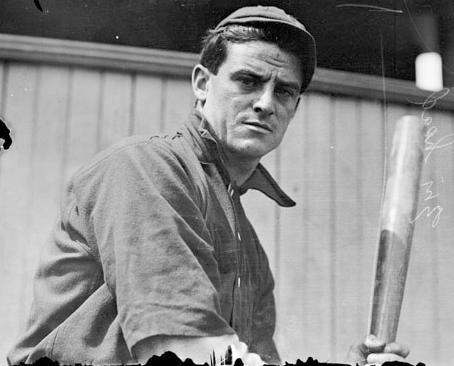
- Donlin as a Cincinnati Red, 1903
- Outfielder
- Born: May 30, 1878; Peoria, Illinois, U.S.
- Died: September 24, 1933 (aged 55); Hollywood, California, U.S.
- Batted: Left Threw: Left

MLB debut
- July 19, 1899, for the St. Louis Perfectos

Last MLB appearance
- October 1, 1914, for the New York Giants

MLB statistics
- Batting average: .333
- Home runs: 51
- Runs batted in: 543
- Stats at Baseball Reference

Teams
- St. Louis Perfectos / Cardinals (1899–1900); Baltimore Orioles (1901); Cincinnati Reds (1902–1904); New York Giants (1904–1906, 1908, 1911); Boston Rustlers (1911); Pittsburgh Pirates (1912); New York Giants (1914)

Career highlights and awards
- World Series champion (1905)

Michael Joseph Donlin (May 30, 1878 – September 24, 1933) was an American professional baseball outfielder and actor. His Major League Baseball (MLB) career spanned from 1899 to 1914 in which he played mainly in the National League for seven teams over 12 seasons. His most notable time was with the New York Giants, where he starred in the outfield for John McGraw's 1904 pennant winners and 1905 World Series champions. One of the finest hitters of the dead-ball era, his .333 career batting average ranks 28th all time and he finished in the top three in batting five times. In each of those same seasons, he also finished in the top ten in the league in on-base percentage, slugging percentage, and home runs.

Donlin, who was given the nickname "Turkey Mike" for his unique strut, was a controversial character— his entertaining personality, flamboyant style of dress, and prodigious talent as a hitter caused him to be lionized as "the baseball idol of Manhattan." However, alcoholism led to friction with club officials and incarceration. Donlin attempted to leverage his popularity as an athlete to launch a career in Broadway theatre where he met and married vaudeville comedian Mabel Hite in 1906. Together, they performed in the baseball-themed play Stealing Home for about three years.

Between the waning popularity of the play in 1911 and Hite's death the following year, Donlin attempted short-lived comebacks with the Giants, Boston Rustlers, and Pittsburgh Pirates. His forays into acting cut short an undeniable talent that could have been a much more successful major league career; he reached 100 games in just five of his major league seasons. After convincing McGraw to sign him for the last time in 1914, Donlin endured a disappointing 35-game cameo with the Giants, leading him to devote his efforts to launch his acting career. He migrated to Hollywood, where close friend John Barrymore helped him attain work. Although he made at least 53 appearances on film, the prospects of stardom never materialized. Donlin remained in Hollywood continuing in his acting career until his death in 1933.

== Baseball career ==
Donlin made his way to California and was playing for the Santa Cruz Sandcrabs in 1899 when he was purchased by the St. Louis Perfectos for "little more than train fare." Donlin learned of the transaction while he was locked up in a Santa Cruz jail for drunkenness. He gained admittance when he first arrived at St. Louis' League Park by pointing the gatekeeper to a newspaper photograph of himself which he had pinned to his lapel.

Despite not joining the team until mid-July, he finished 10th in the National League in home runs and batted .323. The following season he hit .326 and finished third in home runs with 10 while only playing in about half of St. Louis' games. On a team full of good hitters, Donlin found it difficult to get regular playing time because of his poor defense and decided to jump to the Baltimore Orioles of the new American League in 1901 to play for his former teammate in St. Louis, John McGraw.

"Turkey Mike", nicknamed because of his gait while walking, hit .340 with Baltimore, which was good for second in the league. But in March of 1902, he was sentenced to six months in prison for assaulting two people in Baltimore while drunk and was promptly released by the Orioles. After serving his time, Donlin was picked up by the Cincinnati Reds and hit .287 for them in the last month of the season. In 1903, he finished third in the league in hitting at .351 and placed in the top five in the National League in virtually every offensive category.

Donlin hit .356 in 1904, when he had another drunken episode in St. Louis. The Reds first suspended him for 30 days and then traded him to the New York Giants, where he was once again reunited with John McGraw who was now managing the team. Donlin finished out the 1904 season hitting a respectable .280 after the trade and helped the Giants win the National League pennant. His combined batting average for 1904 ended up at .329, good enough for second in the league for the second time in the career of the 26-year-old.

Donlin followed up with the best season of his career in 1905. Playing a full season for the first time, Donlin hit .356, good for third in the National League, and led the league in runs scored as well as finishing in the top five in several other batting categories. He led the Giants to the World Series where he hit .263 and scored 4 runs in 5 games as the Giants defeated the Philadelphia Athletics for their first World Series Championship.

On April 11, 1906, Donlin was married to Mabel Hite, a vaudeville and Broadway actress. Tragedy struck early in the 1906 season, however, as he broke his ankle sliding into second base and was lost for the remainder of the season. Cocky and brash as ever, Donlin demanded his same salary for the 1907 season as well as a $600 bonus incentive for staying sober throughout the year. When Giants owner John T. Brush refused, Donlin retired and sat out the entire 1907 season. Donlin spent the time traveling with his wife and became interested in the theater and the high-society lifestyle that came with it.

Donlin returned to the Giants for the 1908 season without showing any effects from a year-long layoff as he hit .334 and finished second in the league in hitting for the third time in his career. In his first home game back, he hit a game-winning two-run home run in the bottom of the 9th inning. He was also among the league leaders in virtually every other offensive category and turned in an adequate job defensively for the first time.

=== Comeback ===
In 1911, Donlin returned to his old team and manager, John McGraw, after a two-year break for acting.

Donlin's talents had declined and was no longer worth the problems he created and was sold to the Boston Rustlers, having only played 12 games for his former New York team. Boston immediately inserted him into their starting lineup and Donlin responded by hitting .315 for them.

Unwilling to negotiate with a hard-bargaining, poor defensive outfielder on a poor team, Boston traded him to Pittsburgh, where he played the 1912 season as a reserve for the Pirates, batting .316. In the fall of 1912, Hite was diagnosed with cancer and died in October. In December Pittsburgh placed Donlin on waivers and he was claimed by the Philadelphia Phillies. Donlin refused to go to the Phillies and instead retired, once again, from baseball.

He had a change of heart and attempted a comeback late in 1913 with the minor league Jersey City Skeeters and convinced his old friend, John McGraw, to select him to a traveling team that barnstormed in Europe, Asia and Africa in the winter of 1913. Encouraged by his hitting, McGraw gave Donlin a roster spot on the 1914 Giants but the magic in his bat was gone. Hitting only .161 in 35 games, Donlin called it quits, this time for good.

== Career statistics ==
G	AB	R	H	2B	3B	HR	RBI	SB	BB	AVG	OBP	SLG	FLD%
1049	3854	669	1282	176	97	51	543	213	312	.333	.386	.468	.936

== Acting career ==
On October 26, 1908, Donlin made his stage debut in Stealing Home, a one-act play written by Donlin and Hite. Although the reviews for Donlin were mixed, critics raved over his wife's performance and the show became a smash hit. Claiming he made more money from his play, Donlin left baseball and vowed never to return to baseball but after three successful years, the play's popularity diminished and with Hite not able to land any successful roles, Donlin returned to baseball.

Starting in 1914, Donlin teamed up with Marty McHale, for an act they titled, "Right Off the Bat".

Donlin later made the career change once again from baseball to acting, gradually switching from stage to screen. He had more success on the baseball field than in the entertainment industry, although he appeared in a number of movies in small roles, including the silent classic The General (1926), and in Paramount's first sound feature Warming Up (1928). He was also retained as an advisor on a number of baseball movies. One of Donlin's great friends and drinking buddies was renowned actor John Barrymore. Donlin appeared in at least two of the actor's silent pictures, Raffles, the Amateur Cracksman (1917) and The Sea Beast (1926). One of his many cinematic appearances was in an uncredited role as a Hong Kong bartender in One Way Passage.

== Personal life ==
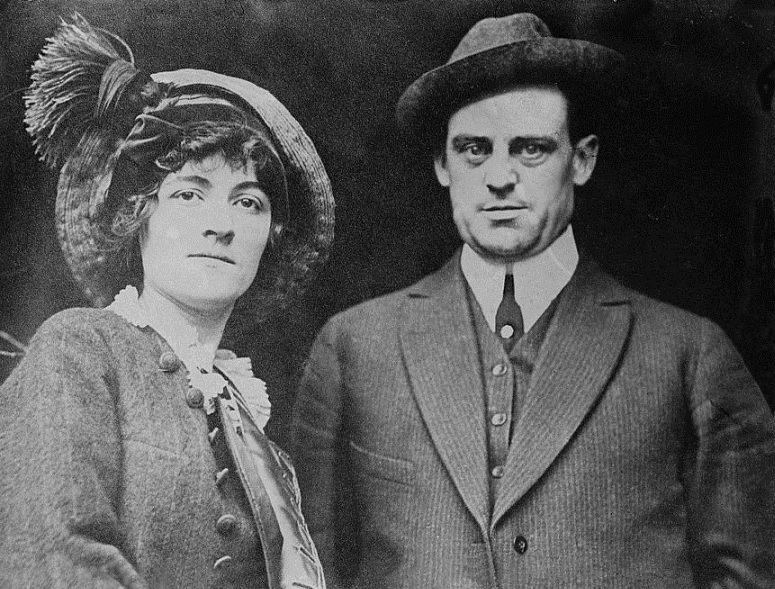
Mike Donlin and his first wife, Mabel Hite, around 1910.

Born in Peoria, Illinois, Donlin's family soon moved to Erie, Pennsylvania, where he lost both his father, railroad conductor John Donlin, and mother, Maggie, in a train accident when he was a young boy. He was forced to hustle to survive from a young age, worked as a machinist in his youth and was resultantly a sickly child. At 15 years old he found work selling candy on a California-bound train. Once in California, he put down roots.

Donlin was a flamboyant playboy, a sharp dresser and a notorious drinker. With his dashing looks and penchant for finding trouble, he was equally popular with women and men and was one of the most popular players in baseball for a short time at the peak of his career. As a young minor leaguer in California, Donlin asked a San Francisco Examiner employee to run a photograph of him in the paper, saying, "I know I'll get a break. I know I'm going to be great." A month after Admiral George Dewey's victory at the Battle of Manila Bay, University of Oregon baseball coach Tom Kelly recalled Donlin using a bat that he had painted red, white and blue and named "Dewey."

In October 1914 Donlin married actress Rita Ross, known for her part in the musical comedy team Ross and Fenton.

=== Death ===
Donlin died in his sleep of a heart attack on September 24, 1933, at age 55 in Hollywood, California.

=== Popular culture ===
The 1949 musical film Take Me Out to the Ball Game may have been influenced by Donlin's life story. The story involves a reigning World Series championship Major League Baseball team (the fictitious "Chicago Wolves") whose two star players moonlight in the off-season as vaudeville performers, the commitment to which causes them to arrive late to spring training, thus angering their team manager and owner.

The script was written by Gene Kelly, who portrays Wolves' star shortstop/Vaudevillian "Eddie O'Brien". Frank Sinatra co-stars as second baseman/vaudevillian "Dennis Ryan".

The San Jose Giants, the Single-A affiliate of the San Francisco Giants baseball club, have a BBQ and picnic area, "Turkey Mike's BBQ", named after Donlin.

== Partial filmography ==
- Raffles, the Amateur Cracksman (1917)
- The Unchastened Woman (1918)
- Woman-Proof (1923)
- Railroaded (1923)
- The Trouble Shooter (1924)
- Hit and Run (1924)
- The Sea Beast (1925)
- Fifth Avenue Models (1925)
- The Unnamed Woman (1925)
- The Primrose Path (1925)
- The General (1926) - Union General #2
- Her Second Chance (1926)
- The Noose (1928)
- Warming Up (1928)
- Spite Marriage (1929)
- Noisy Neighbors (1929)
- Hot Curves (1930)
- The Secret Witness (1931)
- One Way Passage (1932)
- High Gear (1933)
- Swellhead (1935)

== See also ==
- List of Major League Baseball career batting average leaders
- List of Major League Baseball annual runs scored leaders
- List of Major League Baseball career stolen bases leaders
- List of Major League Baseball single-game hits leaders
