= Walter Jones (actor, born 1874) =

American actor (1874–1922)

Walter Newton Jones
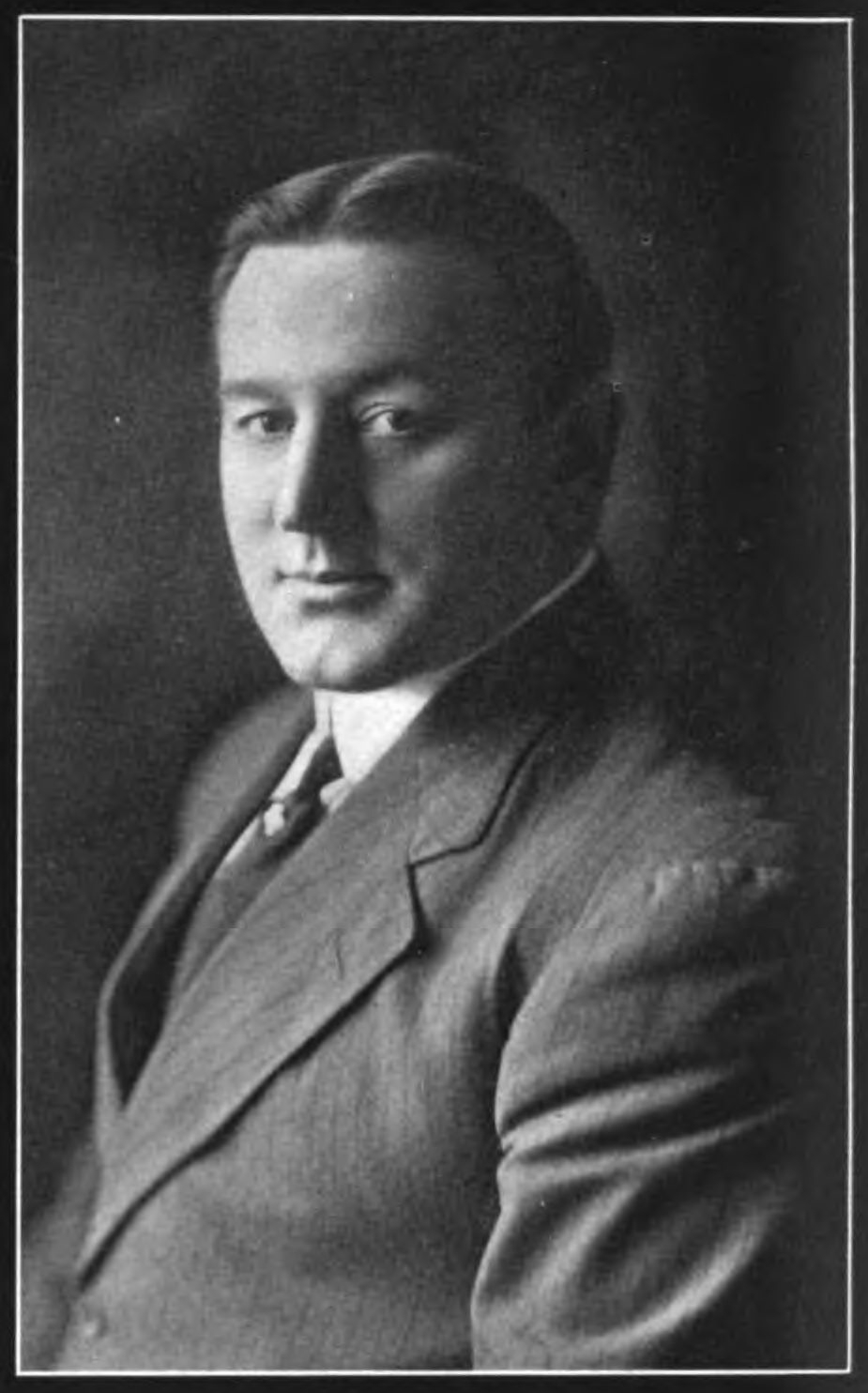
- Born: October 2, 1874; Springfield, Ohio
- Died: May 26, 1922 (aged 47); Bensonhurst, New York Brooklyn
- Occupation: Actor
- Years active: 1893-1922
- Spouse: Blanche Deyo
- Children: 1 daughter(died as a child)

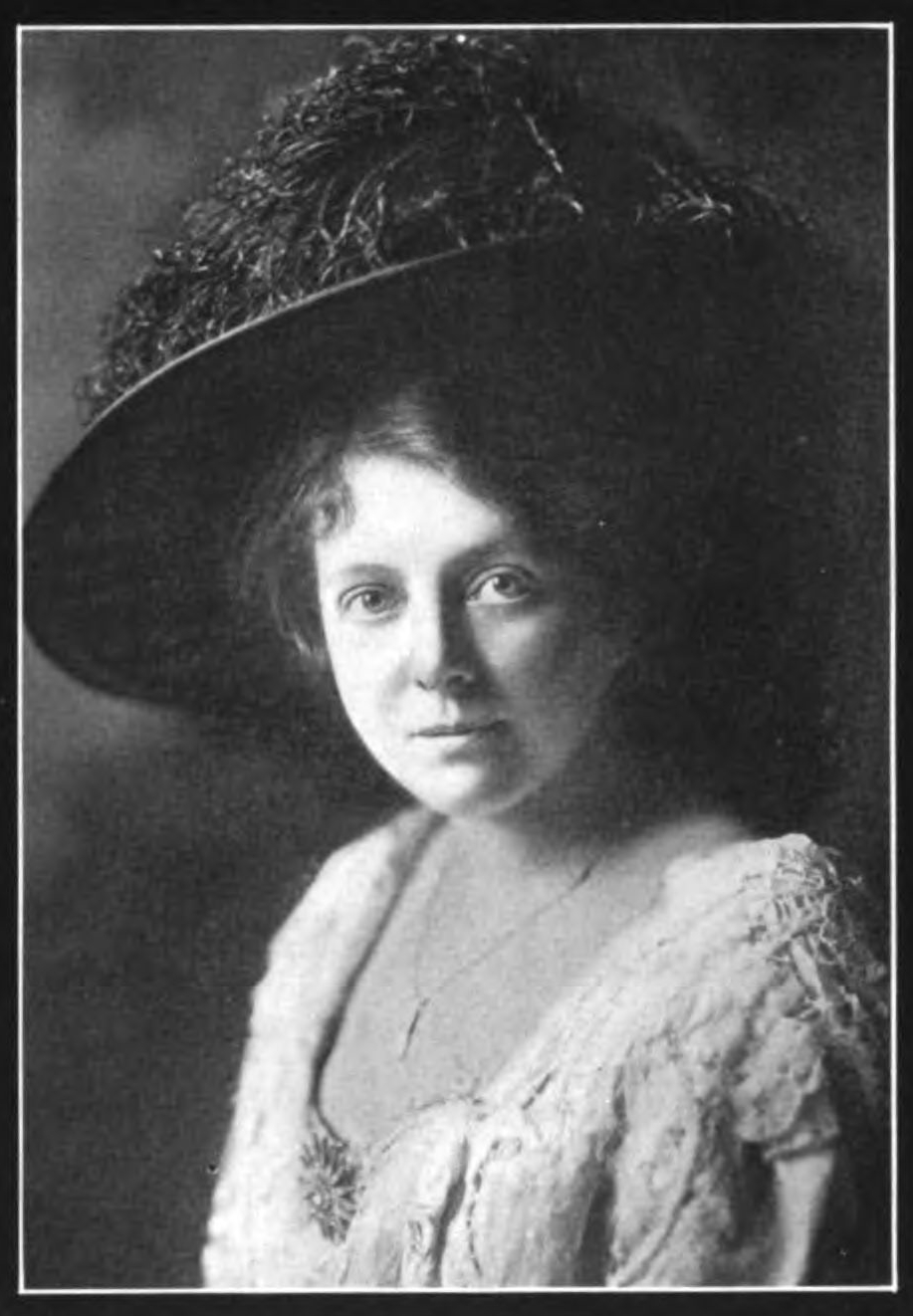
wife Blanche Deyo.

Walter Newton Jones, better known as Walter Jones, (October 2, 1874- May 26, 1922) was an American actor, comedian, and singer who had an active performance career from 1886 through 1921. As a younger performer he was athletic, lanky, and slim, and often incorporated acrobatics into his work as a comedic actor. He later developed into a heavy set man who was known for his skills as a mimic. He was married to the dancer and actress Blanche Deyo (1878-1933).

Jones began his performance career at the age of 12 as an acrobat and clown in the circus troupe the Cyclonic Vincents. He then performed briefly in blackface in minstrel shows before beginning his legitimate acting career in the theatre troupe of William A. Mestayer in which he performed from 1888 to 1891. In the early 1890s he toured nationally in vaudeville and in a variety of burlesque and musical comedy works. Scouted by the theatrical impresario Edward E. Rice, he joined the 1893 production of 1492 Up to Date in which he scored in the duo role of the comic tramp character Charley Tatters and King Ferdinand of Aragon. He made his Broadway debut in this work which had a lengthy run at Palmer's Theatre in 1893-1894. He became closely associated with portraying tramps on the stage; returning with some frequency to that type of character into the early twentieth century.

Jones returned to the New York stage in Rice's Excelsior, Jr. in 1895. He starred in nearly twenty more Broadway production over the next 26 years; encompassing both musicals and plays. His final Broadway appearance was in Wilson Collison and Avery Hopwood's 1921 play Getting Gertie's Garter. His greatest success in New York was as Jimmy Jinks in the hit play Baby Mine which ran on Broadway in 1910–1911 with a cast led by Jones and Marguerite Clark. He later reunited with Clark in the 1920 silent film Easy to Get. He only appeared in two other films during his career: the short film The Story of a Kiss (1912) and the feature film The Love Bandit (1924).

== Early life and career ==
The son of Dr. and Mrs. Isaac N. Jones, Walter Newton Jones was born in Springfield, Ohio on October 2, 1874. At the age of 12 he ran away from home to join the circus where he began his performance career as a clown and acrobat with the Cyclonic Vincents. In his early career he also worked as an actor in blackface in minstrel shows. In 1888 he toured in the role of Knox Dunlap in Charles Barnard and William A. Mestayer's musical farce We, Us, & Co.. This production began a four-year period in which Jones toured in musical farces created by Mestayer; with other works including The Tourists and The Grab Bag.

In February 1891 Jones appeared in the premiere of George C. Jenks's musical burlesque The United States Mail at Ford's Grand Opera House in Baltimore. By November 1891, he had joined the cast of the touring production of Aunt Bridget's Baby in the role of Owen McFee; a work which starred female impersonator George W. Munroe in the title role. He was still touring in that production as late as March 1982. By the following May he was touring in Robert Griffin Morris's The Pulse of New York; a work in which he portrayed four different comedic characters.

== 1492 and other work for Edward E. Rice ==
Jones was working in vaudeville when he was scouted by the theatrical impresario Edward E. Rice. Rice was the producer of Robert Barnet's 1492 in which Jones made his debut on the New York stage. The show opened on Broadway on May 15, 1893, at Palmer's Theatre with Jones portraying both Ferdinand of Aragon and the tramp Charley Tatters. After the lengthy Broadway run concluded in 1894 he continued to tour in the show through early November 1895. His portrayal of the tramp and king in this production brought him fame in the United States. Jones later returned to his tramp persona with some regularity in other shows on the national stage and was closely associated with that type of character.

On November 11, 1895 Jones starred in A. Baldwin Sloane and Edward E. Rice's musical Excelsior, Jr. in its premiere of the Hyperion Theatre in New Haven, Connecticut. He had three parts in this production: the folk hero William Tell, the wise-cracking Sammy Smug, and the tramp 'Arry. This work transferred to Broadway where it was played for the grand opening of Hammerstein's Olympia Theatre on November 25, 1895. Conflicts with Rice led Jones to quit the production in December 1895, but these issues were resolved and he returned to the production after a little more than a week's absence. He continued in the part until leaving the production in March 1896.

== Later life and career ==
In April 1896 Jones replaced Charles Danby in the lead role of Sheriff Roberts in the Broadway production of The Lady Slavey at the Casino Theatre. In the midst of this run he performed in the 1896 version of The Lambs Gambols as a member of that social club. He remained at the Casino for its next production, Gustave Kerker's musical revue In Gay New York, which opened in late May 1896. In this piece he demonstrated his gift for mimicry of various New York personalities. The show continued to run until mid-August 1896.

In 1899 he returned to Broadway as Continuous Proctor in The Man in the Moon. His other Broadway credits included The Night of the Fourth (1901), The Chaperons (1902), Miss Pocahontas (1907), Burlesque of The Merry Widow and The Devil (1908), Going Some (1909), Baby Mine (1910–11), Just Like John (1912), The Gentleman from Number 19 (1913), Oh, I Say! (1913), The Third Party (1914), The Blue Envelope (1916), Our Little Wife (1916), Mary's Ankle (1917), Rock-a-Bye Baby (1918), and Up in Mabel's Room (1919). His final stage appearance was in the 1921 Broadway production of Getting Gertie's Garter.

In 1908 he married his second wife, Blanche Deyo. They had one child, a daughter who died as a child. Jones died on May 26, 1922. His ashes were dispersed into Gravesend Bay; the same body of water his daughter's ashes were placed.
