= Queer Visitors from the Marvelous Land of Oz =

Newspaper comic strip by L. Frank Baum

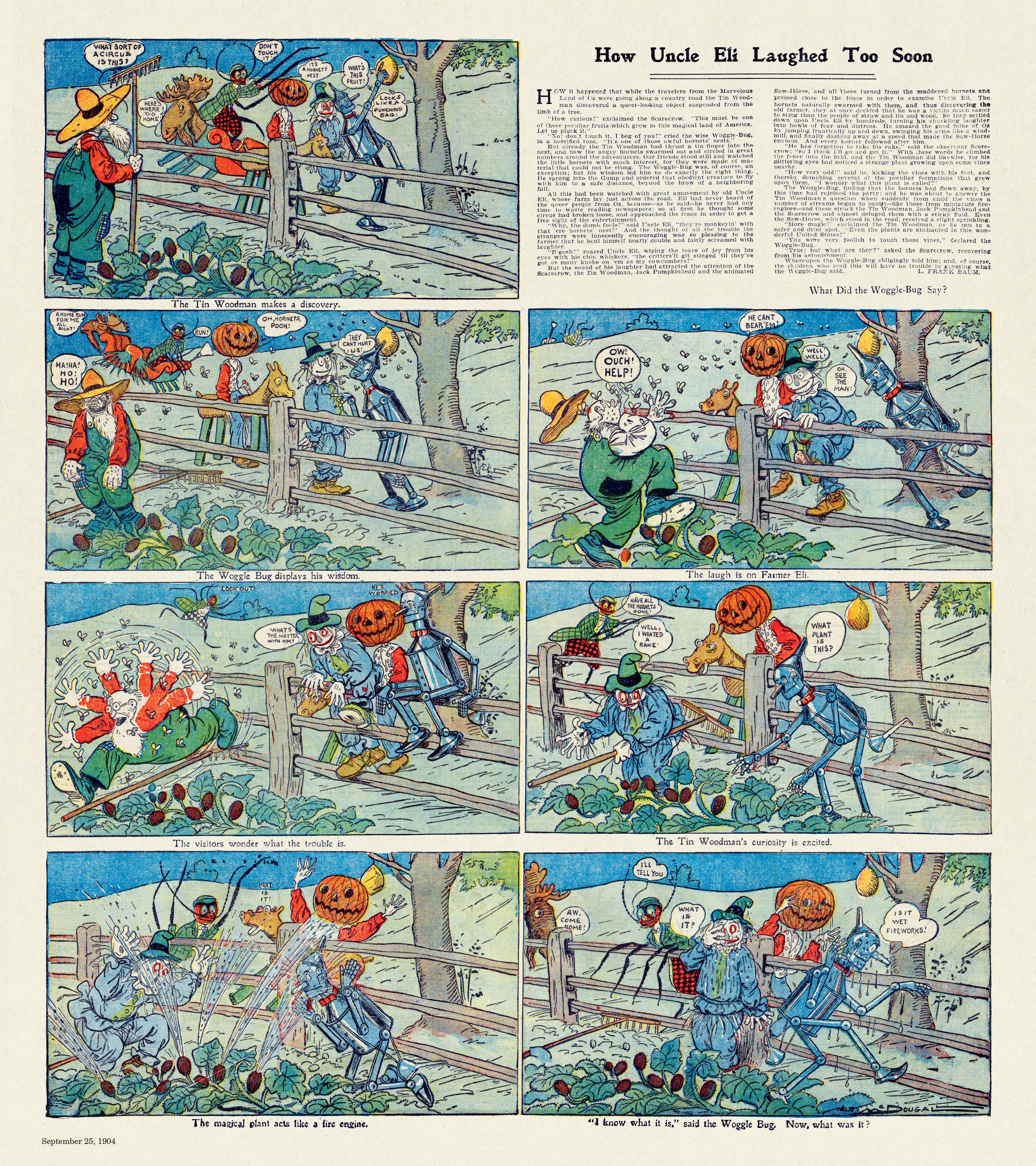
"How Uncle Eli Laughed Too Soon" (September 25, 1904)

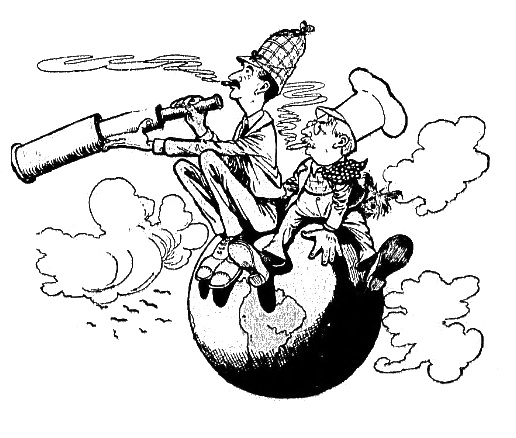
Caricature of Baum and McDougall from a cartoon announcing the comic strip

Queer Visitors from the Marvelous Land of Oz is a newspaper comic strip written by L. Frank Baum and illustrated by Walt McDougall, a political cartoonist for the Philadelphia North American. Queer Visitors appeared in the North American, the Chicago Record-Herald and other newspapers from 28 August 1904 to 26 February 1905. The series chronicles the misadventures of the Scarecrow, the Tin Woodman, the Woggle-Bug, Jack Pumpkinhead, and the Sawhorse, as the Gump flies them to various cities in the United States. The comic strip in turn produced its own derivation, The Woggle-Bug Book (1905).

Queer Visitors was formatted as a series of prose stories surrounded by large illustrations, and is therefore not a comic strip in the modern sense.

== Development ==
The project was designed to promote the 1904 novel The Marvelous Land of Oz. Coincidentally, it ran at the same time as a comic strip featuring Oz characters visiting America which was written and drawn by W. W. Denslow. Denslow drew the illustrations for The Wonderful Wizard of Oz and shared in its copyright. After Baum and Denslow had a falling-out, Denslow exercised his copyright via his strip, called Denslow's Scarecrow and Tin-Man, which ran in relatively few newspapers from December 1904 to March 1905—an artistic and commercial failure.

== Reprints ==
The Visitors from Oz, published by Reilly and Lee in 1960, includes about half of Baum's Visitors stories rewritten and illustrated by Dick Martin.

The 27 Queer Visitors stories have been republished in part in book form as The Third Book of Oz (1989) from Buckethead Enterprises, which omitted the outdated ethnic humor. The Buckethead edition was a reprint under a new cover of an earlier edition. The Third Book of Oz also includes another early promotion project, The Woggle-Bug Book (written by Baum and illustrated by Ike Morgan); the 1989 volume is illustrated by Eric Shanower. Hungry Tiger Press republished the stories with the original text but used The Visitors from Oz as the title, like the 1960 adaptation.

In June, 2009, Sunday Press Books released a collected edition of the newspaper strips in their original format and coloring. The book also included W. W. Denslow's competing strip Denslow's Scarecrow And Tin-Man as well as other comic strips by Walt McDougall, W. W. Denslow, and John R. Neill.

== Adaptation ==
Ray Bolger recorded an audio adaptation of nine Queer Visitors tales, issued as "The Little Oz Stories." This was the fourth in a series of four audiotapes, The Oz Audio Collection, recorded by Bolger and issued by Caedmon Audio from 1976-1983.
