= The Woggle-Bug (musical) =

1905 musical

- The Fantastic Fairy Extravaganza
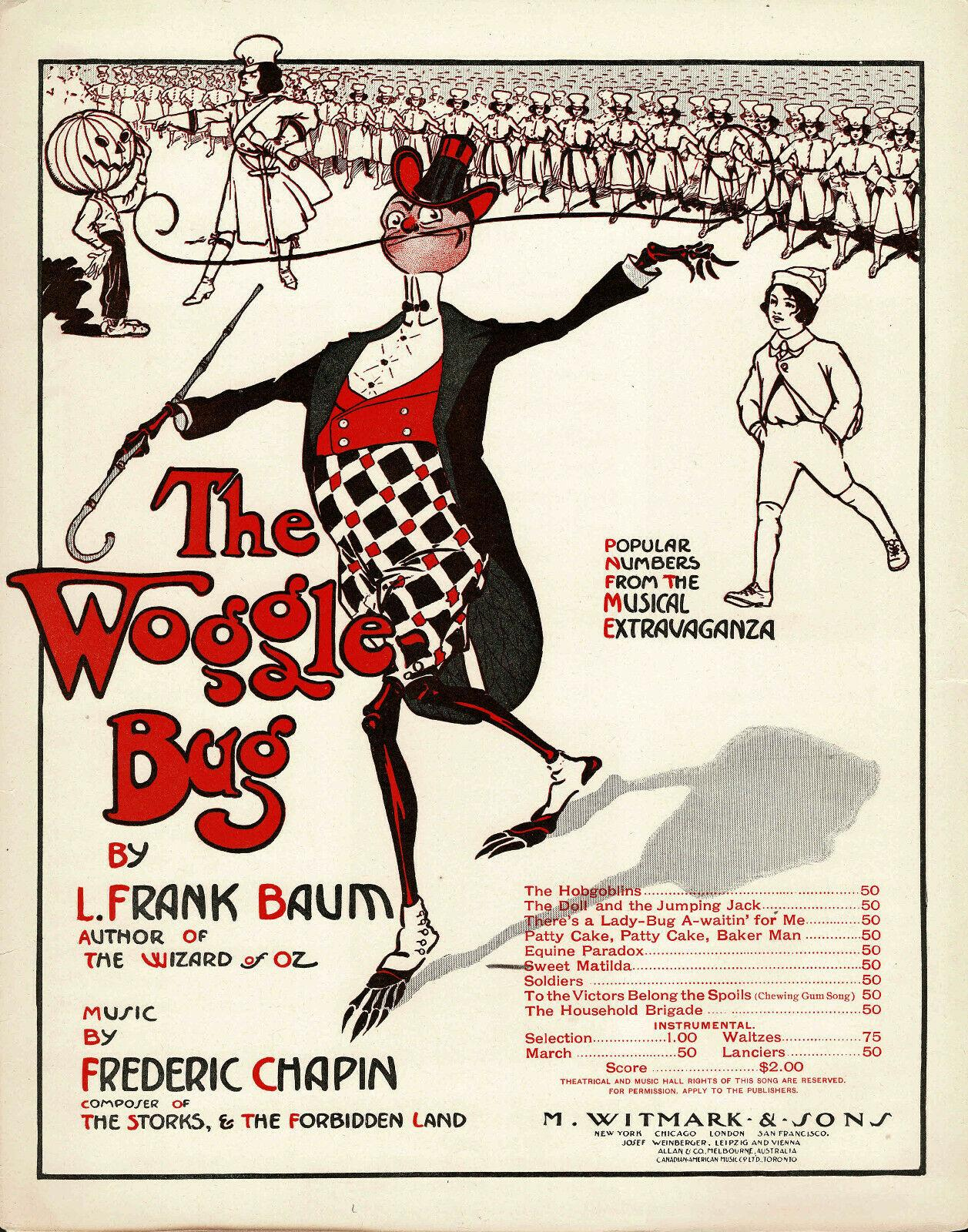
- Original 1905 sheet music
- Music: Frederic Chapin
- Lyrics: L. Frank Baum; Arthur Gillespie (uncredited)
- Book: L. Frank Baum
- Basis: The Marvelous Land of Oz by L. Frank Baum
- Productions: 1905 Chicago

The Woggle-Bug is a 1905 musical based on the 1904 novel The Marvelous Land of Oz by L. Frank Baum, with book and lyrics by the author and music by Frederic Chapin that opened June 18, 1905 at the Garrick Theater in Chicago under the direction of Frank Smithson, a Shubert Organization employee. The musical was a major critical and commercial failure, running less than a month. Chapin, however, had proven quite saleable to the publisher, M. Witmark and Sons, and many of the songs were published. The music director was Frank Pallma. The surviving sheet music was published by Hungry Tiger Press in 2002.

== Background ==
After the success of The Wizard of Oz on Broadway in 1903, Baum set out immediately to write a sequel, The Marvelous Land of Oz; Being an Account of the Further Adventures of the Scarecrow and the Tin Woodman, which was published in 1904. The book was dedicated to the stars of the musical, Fred A. Stone and David C. Montgomery, who became major stars because of the show. However, The Wizard of Oz was still running, and Montgomery & Stone refused to leave it to do an untested sequel.

As a result, the story had to be heavily overhauled to eliminate the Scarecrow and the Tin Woodman, as the novel had excluded Dorothy Gale and the Cowardly Lion, neither of whom were major draws in the stage show. The Woggle-Bug is made the driving force of the story, although he had been introduced fairly late in the novel (Chapter 12 of 24), and did not make a major contribution to the plot. His introduction is moved to the beginning of the play, and he is given a subplot about chasing after a checked dress with which he has fallen in love. The Scarecrow is replaced with a Regent named Sir Richard Spud, and the Emerald City is renamed "the City of Jewels," although it is still stated (if only in the lyrics) to be set in Oz. Glinda is replaced with Maetta from The Magical Monarch of Mo, as she had appeared in several versions of the earlier musical.

Unlike The Wizard of Oz, no songs were subsequently interpolated. Two of the songs were not originally written for the musical, "Sweet Matilda" and "Soldiers." They were songs that Chapin had composed with lyricist Arthur Gillespie prior to his collaboration with Baum. Gillespie, however, was denied credit, and Baum is credited as lyricist for both songs.

The show was apparently retooled at several points. The program printed in the Hungry Tiger Press sheet music collection comes from late in the run; "The Equine Paradox" is not mentioned, and the play is presented in two acts rather than three.

== Synopsis ==
=== Prologue ===
A cornfield, with the profile of Mombi's hut at right, in a purple-tinted farm landscape filled with pumpkins.
Tip exits Mombi's hut, dragging a wooden form of a man behind him, props him up on a central shock of corn, and begins carving a face upon it. (He is unfamiliar with Jack O'Lanterns and does not open or empty the pumpkin, but came to the idea himself.) When he realizes that Mombi is coming, he hides behind a large shock of corn. Mombi is at first frightened, as Tip intended, but then she decides to test a box of Powder of Life. The Pumpkinhead comes to life, and the Harvest Sprites bow to him, and while Mombi dances with glee that the Powder works, Tip takes the Pumpkinhead by the hand and leads him away.

=== Act I ===
==== Scene 1 ====
Interior of a country school house
The schoolchildren enter the classroom of Professor Knowitt and do their introductory exercises and school song, "My Native Fairyland". The Professor finds a Woggle-Bug on the floor and the children all want to see him. With a magic magnifying glass, the Professor projects the Woggle-Bug onto a screen, from which he steps down and introduces himself as "MR. H.M. WOGGLE-BUG T.E." Professor Knowitt is frightened and tries to get him to go back up on the screen. The Woggle-Bug tries to impress the professor with his knowledge, but delivers such malapropisms as "patties" for "patois," following each with a pun.

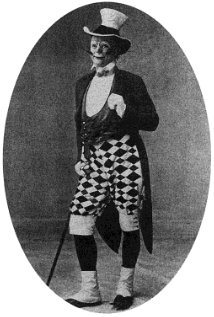
Fred Mace as The Woggle Bug

Mombi enters and inquires if anyone at the school has seen Tip. The Woggle-Bug says no. She mistakes him for a masquerader, but he introduces himself and says that he is at her service. She asks him for help, telling him Tip has run away with the Pumpkinhead, which he mistakes for a romance. She tells him that they have stolen the Powder of Life, worth a million dollars an ounce, because it can bring anything it touches to life. The Woggle-Bug suggests trying it on the Democratic Party. The Professor then insists that the Woggle-Bug is his property to prevent him to go, and the Woggle-Bug retorts that if he is held after school that his parents will bite the Professor.

Five peasant women, who speak as ungrammatical hicks (e.g., "You bet we is."), Prissy, Jessica, Flinders, Melinda, and Bettina enter looking for General Jinjur. The Woggle-Bug falls immediately in love with Prissy's checked dress. The Professor and the Woggle-Bug try to dissuade the girls from war, the Woggle-Bug saying that "it is better to be a Maud Muller than a Carrie Nation." He tries to take the dress from her, and when Mombi reminds him that he promised to help her find Tip and the Pumpkinhead, he tells her that that was before he "knew the pangs of love."

Jinjur enters, and all bow to her. She asks Mombi to join her Army of Revolt, which is encompassed "of gallant milkmaids and scullery ladies" who seek to wrest power from the men who run the City of Jewels. Mombi refuses, but says she will use her magic to aid them in exchange for getting Tip back when the conquest is over. She asks who else will assist them, and Professor Knowitt agrees. The five peasant ladies beg to join her army, Prissy promising to defend her "till death, then I'll resign." Unsure that they will make a contribution, Jinjur calls them the "Awkward Squad" and names Prissy their captain.

Knowitt and Jinjur reminisce about how they attended that very school. Jinjur remembers how Tommy Bangs courted her and called her "Sweet Matilda", and Knowitt reminds her that he attempted to court her, too.

==== Scene 2 ====
"Outside the Gates of the City of Jewels"
Jack Pumpkinhead awakes to the sound of an alarm clock, tries to mess with it in denial, then wakes Tip, who grudgingly accepts that Jack calls him "Papa." Tip says that he dreamed that he was once the Princess Ozma who ruled over the City of Jewels that they now sit before. He explains to Jack why he can't just go to the city gates and claim that he is Princess Ozma, because he isn't just now, having been enchanted by Mombi. They exit to search for an entrance to the city less grand than the one they are before, and as they leave, the morning workers enter delivering their song, "Ting-a-Ling-a-Ling". Unable to find another entrance, they decide to steal into the city by climbing over a wall, making use of a nearby sawhorse. Jack convinces Tip that since they are both made of wood, and Tip has the Powder of Life, that the horse should be alive, too. Tip sprinkles the sawhorse, who springs immediately to life, but Tip has to carve him ears and put them on so that the horse can hear him. Jack suggests that having the horse will help Tip become a princess, but laments that she will get married and leave him when that happens. Tip says that when he was a princess, he had many lovers, one of whom almost won her, in spite of "mamma's watchfulness" and tells the story in "My Little Maid of Oz".

The Regent and Lord Stunt enter, followed by guards and courtiers. The Regent longs for simplicity and is immediately charmed when Tip addresses him with, "Hello, Mr. Regent," rather than by some grand address and says that he and Jack must be disciples of "the great Vogner." Tip explains to the Regent that he was Princess Ozma, and the Regent, eager to retire, promises to find Mombi and force her to change Tip back into Ozma. Until then, the Regent invites Tip to share the palace, leaving Jack behind to meet the arriving Woggle-Bug. After comic banter and an unidentified song and dance, Mombi enters wearing the checked dress, and the Woggle-Bug begins to woo her. He then exits to aid the conquest, the two blowing kisses at one another. Mombi can't remember when anyone ever loved her before. She says it makes her feel naughty just thinking of it, as if she were caught writing letters to Beatrice Barebacks. She then laments that "The Hobgoblins" would stop associating with her were she to get married, then exits.

Prissy enters with the soldiers, and Jack thinks that fighters are married people when Prissy explains what they are doing. Mombi re-enters and tries to catch Jack, promising not to hurt him. The Regent, Stunt, Tip, Woggle-Bug, and sawhorse enter. The Regent pushes the Woggle-Bug away from Mombi and commands her to restore Tip to his proper form. She calls him a fool because it will cause him to lose his job. He threatens her with execution, but the Army of Revolt enters and begins its conquest of the city. Prissy, "in an absurd uniform," carries a banner declaring "Give us Victory, or Give us Fudge," while other women have more straightforward, if ungrammatical, banners of protest. Professor Knowitt wheels in a commissary cart filled with huge packages of fudge. "Soldiers". The Regent tries to talk Jinjur and Prissy out of war, to no avail. The Woggle-Bug retreats from the charge along with the Regent, Tip, and Jack, and after the battle, the city burns, the four are taken prisoner, and the soldiers chant "The Paean of Victory".

=== Act II ===
==== Scene 1 ====
"The Courtyard of the Royal Palace of Princess Ozma"
Jinjur sits on the throne with her feet stretched out on a stool. Servants pass chewing gum to the soldiers who now play games. When a fight breaks out among the girls, she orders them to stop fighting, and to put away their games if they cannot play them without fighting. The women sing the chewing gum song, "To the Victors Belong the Spoils". Jinjur scolds Prissy for hooking her uniform from the back, calling her a turncoat. Prissy then realizes that she can't remember which house she has chosen as her own and sings "I'll Get Another Place". Prissy complains that she tried to bathe in champagne as advised by Ella Wheeler Wilcox, but the sawhorse pulled the plug and she had to bathe in mineral water instead. Jinjur gives Prissy a medal, then orders the soldiers to clean up their games. The men then enter sweeping, dusting, and wheeling baby carts and sing "The Household Brigade".

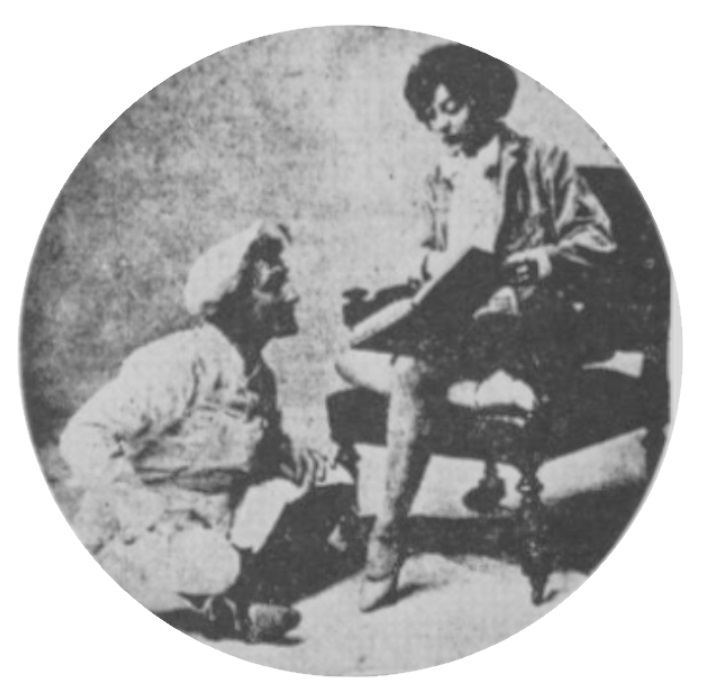
Sidney Deane as The Regent and Blanche Deyo as Tip

Bettina admits the Regent, now a slave, whom Jinjur fancies to marry, but he wants a retiring life in the country, and would not be interested in her unless she resumed being a milkmaid. She decides to lock him up in a luxurious room until he is willing to be hers. Jack and Tip enter, Jack having been made a baker's man, and the two sing "Patty-Cake, Patty-Cake, Baker's Man" and exit. Mombi enters and demands Jack and Tip from Jinjur, insisting that she is responsible for their victory and that Jinjur is her slave. She threatens to change Tip back into Ozma and lose Jinjur the throne. Jinjur repeatedly calls Mombi beautiful to get her to destroy Tip, Jack, and the Woggle-Bug. Mombi does not want to kill Tip, but finally agrees. Jack enters, and Mombi promises to spare him if he obeys her. She orders him to stay put, and when she leaves, he sings "Jack O'Lantern", then exits.

When Mombi returns with Jinjur, she promises to feed the Regent a love potion. At Jinjur's command, the Army brings in Tip and the Woggle-Bug, and the Awkward Squad brings in Jack. Mombi says that she will transform Tip into a marble statue to prevent him from further declamations that he is Ozma, have the pumpkinhead turned into a pie and served to the army with cheese, then orders in Aunt Dinah, the cook (a mammy caricature played by a man), and demands the Woggle-Bug to be cooked Newberg style on toast. When Dinah arrives, she is wearing the dress, and the Woggle-Bug makes his move. Dinah thinks that he is a lobster and rejects him, and he sings his lament, "There's a Lady-Bug A'Waiting For Me", and all exit.

Meanwhile, Professor Knowitt and Prissy have fallen in love. Their romantic meeting is interrupted by the Woggle-Bug complaining that he is lost without the love of his life. Prissy wants Knowitt to squash the bug, but he refuses, and offers to save him from Dinah by reducing him. He refuses. Prissy says that to save himself from heartbreak, he should cut a piece of the dress with shears and wear it by his heart. After the Woggle-Bug leaves, Knowitt asks Prissy to marry him, and they sing "The Doll and the Jumping-Jack" (a song about lovers forced to part by outside circumstances) and exit.

The Woggle-Bug, Tip, and Jack build The Gump to escape. Jinjur, Mombi, Prissy, and Knowitt enter as they leave by air, but none will follow Mombi's orders to stop them. Tip says they are going to the palace of Maetta the Sorceress. Mombi does an incantation around the cauldron, joined by other witches and followed by a dance of black cats.

==== Scene 2 ====
Dumped in a pasture by The Gump, the three, deciding that they are safe for the moment, reminisce about "The Things We Learned at School", then exit hurriedly when a storm begins. Soon after, they are intimidated by a chorus of chrysanthemums with the faces of the Army of Revolt, who move and block their path whichever way they go. The Woggle-Bug demonstrates that his father was a wizard and summons a flood to stop them. When the flood subsides, they see Maetta's palace in the distance outlined by electric lights.

=== Act III ===
Maetta the Sorceress is seated on the throne. Her talisman tells her that strangers have arrived. She has her favorite page, Athlos, admit them. Tip kneels before Maetta, pleading to be restored to his true form. After Tip reiterates the plot, Maetta has Athlos send fairies to bring Jinjur, Mombi, Prissy, and Knowitt to the palace. Maetta asks what the others want from her, and Jack says that he wants a way to preserve his head, and the Woggle-Bug, the dress. The sawhorse then chases the Regent into Maetta's palace. The Regent says that he escaped from Jinjur aboard the sawhorse, who then tried to kick his brains out for suggesting he teach him about the Simple Life. He explains that he would have Jinjur as Mrs. Spud, but not with himself as Mr. Jinjur.

Maetta's attendants bring in the prisoners, with Jinjur dressed as a milkmaid and Prissy wearing the checked skirt and a coat covered in medals. Maetta orders Athlos to cast Mombi into the dungeon, the latter spewing insults at the others as they drag her away. When Maetta takes away Jinjur for her punishment, Jack wishes that they all had sawhorses, and the Woggle-Bug works his magic, summoning six sawhorses for the number, "The Equine Paradox" (Tip, Woggle-Bug, Jack, Regent, Prissy, Professor).

Maetta returns, and orders Prissy to become a housemaid, and her military honors stripped. Maetta's attendants do so forcefully, as Prissy screams and struggles, then they march her off. Maetta disbands Jinjur's army and forces her to become a milkmaid. Jinjur protests that Tip can't be queen, so Maetta has him rest his head on her lap, singing "The Sandman Is Near" to him, and Ozma emerges during the second chorus. The Regent, seeing Jinjur as a milkmaid, wishes to marry her, and she agrees. Ozma promises to make Jack her prime minister. When the Professor announces that he and Prissy are to be married, Maetta decides this is sufficient punishment for them. The two go off, but the Woggle-Bug seizes Prissy's skirt, demanding it be his. She tears it off and throws it in his face. He then puts it on as a vest under his coat and sings a reprise of "Mr. H.M. Woggle-Bug, T.E." with the ensemble. As the song concludes, an attendant places a large tin can, labeled "Canned Pumpkin" over Jack's head.

== Cast ==
- Ozma, Princess Royal of the City of Jewels, who has been transformed by the witch into a boy known by the name of "Tip"...Blanche Deyo
- Mombi, the witch...Phoebe Coyne
- Jack Pumpkinhead, who is not really a man, but just happens to be alive...Hal Godfrey
- Professor Knowitt...Sidney Bracey
- Mr. H.M. Woggle-Bug, T.E....Fred Mace
- Captain Prissy Pring, Aide-de-camp to General Jinjur...Mabel Hite
- General Jinjur, Commander of the Army of Revolt...Beatrice McKenzie

Gleaners who join the Army as the "Awkward Squad":

- Bettina...Anna Killduff
- Flinders...Grace Marshall
- Jessica...Mabel Lorena
- Melinda...Mabel Laffin
- Aunt Dinah, Chef in the Palace of the Regent...Walter B. Smith (travesty role, probably in blackface)
- The sawhorse, carelessly brought to life my means of the Magic Powder...Eddie Cunningham
- Sir Richard Spud, Regent of the City of Jewels...Sydney Deane
- Lord Stunt...W.H.Thompson
- Queen Maetta, the Sorceress...Helen Allyn
- Athlos, her favorite Page...Jeanette Allen

Harvest Sprites

- Marie Grandpre
- Gertrude Tyson
- Gertrude Barnes
- Agnes Major
- Nell Irish
- Mabel Underwood
- Mabel Leichman
- Ethel Garland
- Lena Sonstoby
- Eva Carey
- Dorothy Wilson
- Eildeen Sheridan

School Girls

- Florence Cooke
- Ethel Wertley
- Lynda Nelson
- Gertrude De Mont
- Helen Hammond
- Isabel Gordon
- Eugenie Cochran
- Isabel Phelon
- Laura Cunningham
- Gertrude Wessell

School Boys

- Lillia Loraine
- Jeanette Allen
- Elayne Frohman
- Hattie Bayard
- Janet MacDonald
- Irene Calder
- Bessie Galardi
- Catherine Brooks
- Orrel Booth
- Charlotte Scott

Ice Men

- Lillia Lorraine
- Florence Cooke
- Dorothy Wilson
- Mabel Underwood

Milk Men

- Nell Irish
- Marie Grandpre
- Agnes Major
- Ethel Garland

Messenger Boys

- Charlotte Scott
- Elayne Frohman
- Bessie Galardi
- Irene Caulder

Postmen

- Gertrude Barnes
- Mabel Leichman
- Eileen Sheridan
- Lena Sonstoby

Courtiers:

- Horace G. De Bank
- Joseph Snyder (actor)
- John Loveridge
- Johan Veltman
- Charles Dudley
- John Blackman
- H. Linke
- Fred Hall
- John F. Purnell
- Arthur Bennett
- I.M. Flickinger

Hobgoblins

- Eugenie Cochran
- Charlotte Scott
- Janet MacDonald
- Marie Dahlgren
- Irene Calder
- Laura Cunningham
- Alma Dahlgren
- Helen Wilton
- Mabel Leichman
- Elsie Doyle
- Virginia Calvert
- and Calhoun [sic]

The Army of Revolt

- Florence Cooke
- Jeannette Allen
- Janet MacDonald
- Marie Grandpre
- Gertrude Tyson
- Isabel Phelon
- Dorothy Wilson
- Charlotte Scott
- Eileen Sheridan
- Ethel Wertley
- Elaine Frohman
- Laura Cunningham
- Mabel Underwood
- Nell Irish
- Helen Gordon
- Agnes Major
- Irene Calder
- Mabel Leichman
- Hattie Bayard
- Orrel Booth
- Gertrude Barnes
- Rose Leland
- Bessie Golardi [sic]
- Lillia Lorraine
- Helen Hammond
- Eugenia Cochran
- Gertrude De Mont
- Ethel Garland
- Neela Paddock
- Edith Walters
- Katherine Brooks
- Lena Sonstoby
- Lynda Nelson
- Violet Reed
- Edna Mitchell
- Marie Dahlgren
- Anna Dahlgren
- Elise Doyle
- Virginia Calvert
- Queenie Wilson

Household Brigade

- Horace G. De Bank
- W.H. Thompson
- Joseph Snyder
- John Loveridge
- Johan Veltman
- John Blackman
- H. Linke
- Fred Hall
- John F. Purnell
- Arthur Bennett
- I.M. Flick [sic]
- Charles Dudley

Lady-Bugs

- Janet MacDonald
- Laura Cunningham
- Irene Calder
- Mabel Leichman
- Eugenie Cochran
- Helen Wilton
- Marie Dahlgren
- Elsie Doyle
- Virigina Calvert
- Charlotte Scott
- Queenie Wilson
- Alma Dahlgren

Dolls

- Gertrude Barnes
- Jeanette Allen
- Bessie Galardi
- Gertrude De Mont

Jumping-Jacks

- Katherine Brooks
- Elaine Frohman
- Eileen Sheridan
- Agnes Major
- Lillia Lorraine

Chrysanthemums

- Florence Cooke
- Jeanette Allen
- Marie Grandpre
- Gertrude Tyson
- Isabel Phelon
- Dorothy Wilson
- Charlotte Scott
- Eileen Sheridan
- Ethel Wertley
- Elayne Frohman
- Mabel Underwood
- Nell Irish
- Helen ? [sic]
- Agnes Major
- Hattie Bayard
- Orrel Booth
- Gertrude Barnes
- Rose Leland
- Bessie Golardi [sic]
- Lillia Lorraine
- Helen Hammond
- Gertrude De Mont
- Edith Walters
- Katherine Brooks
- Lena Sonstoby
- Lynda Nelson
- Violet Reed
- E. Wilson

Black Cats

- Marie Dahlgren
- Elsie Doyle
- Edna Mitchell
- Virginia Calvert
- Alma Dahlgren
- Dorothy Wilson

Witches

- Mabel Leichman
- Janet McDonald [sic]
- Eugenie Cochran
- Charlotte Scott
- Laura Cunningham
- Eva Carey

== Musical numbers ==
1. Instrumental Drama—The Creation of Jack Pumpkinhead
2. Chorus of School Children
  School Song: My Native Fairyland (Professor Knowitt and School Children)
  The Capture of the Woggle-Bug
3. Mr. H.M. Woggle-Bug, T.E. (Woggle-Bug)
4. Sweet Matilda (General Jinjur) (lyrics by Arthur Gillespie)
5. Ting-a-Ling-a-Ling! (Postmen, Messenger Boys, Milkmen, and Icemen)
6. My Little Maid of Oz (Tip)
7. The Hobgoblins (Mombi)
8. Soldiers (General Jinjur and Army of Revolt) (lyrics by Arthur Gillespie)
9. Act I Finale:
  The Bombardment of the City of Jewels
  The Paean of Victory
10. To the Victors Belong the Spoils (Chewing Gum Song) (Jinjur and Army)
11. The Household Brigade (Male Chorus)
12. Patty-Cake, Patty-Cake, Baker's Man (Tip and Jack, according to the script; Tip and Regent, according to the program; Jinjur and Regent, according to the sheet music)
13. I'll Get Another Place (Prissy Pring)
14. Jack O'Lantern (Jack Pumpkinhead)
15. There's a Lady-Bug A'Waiting for Me (Woggle-Bug)
16. The Doll and the Jumping Jack (Prissy and Professor)
17. The Equine Paradox (Sextette: Tip, Woggle-Bug, Jack, Regent, Prissy, Professor)
18. The Things We Learned at School (Tip, Jack, and Woggle-Bug)
19. Transformation:
  The Storm—Rain of Cats and Dogs
  Dance and Chorus of Chrysanthemums
20. The Sandman Is Near (Tip's Lullaby) (Maetta)
21. Finale

Hungry Tiger Press published the complete sheet music in 2002 with an introduction, notes, and appendix by David Maxine, along with four songs from Chapin and Guy F. Steely's The Storks, the 1902 show whose popularity led Witmark to publish so many songs from such an unsuccessful production. This is not the complete score, only a complete collection of published sheet music from Witmark. Numbers 1, 2, 5, 9, 13, 14, 18, 19, and 21 are not included, as they were not published as song sheets and are not known to survive. Witmark claimed to have published a complete piano score, but there is no evidence that this was ever done. Although the script survives, Hungry Tiger Press elected not to include it.

== Reception ==
Burns Mantle described the play as "entertainment pap for the little ones," and "smothered in a simplicity in which the child mind will revel, and before which the adult mind will nod." Like many critics, he found Mabel Hite to be the standout performance, calling her a "miniature Marie Dressler." He found the screen projection of the rain of cats and dogs to look like corpses and lambasted the moment of toy balloons shot through a cannon. Illustrating his article with a head shot of Mace, he found him "as a comedian, hopelessly buried." He described Hal Godfrey as "a very fair imitator of Stone's scarecrow." He liked Blanche Deyo, describing her as "inspiringly graceful." He gave a sentence of light praise each to Helen Allyn, Sidney Deane, Sidney Bracey, Beatrice McKenzie, and Eddie Cunningham. His ultimate conclusion: "The Woggle-Bug, taken all in all, represents an earnest effort to provide an extravaganza free from objectionable feature. The music is an attractive virtue, and reawakens the hope that some day Composer Chapin will have a really good book to work with."

== Legacy ==
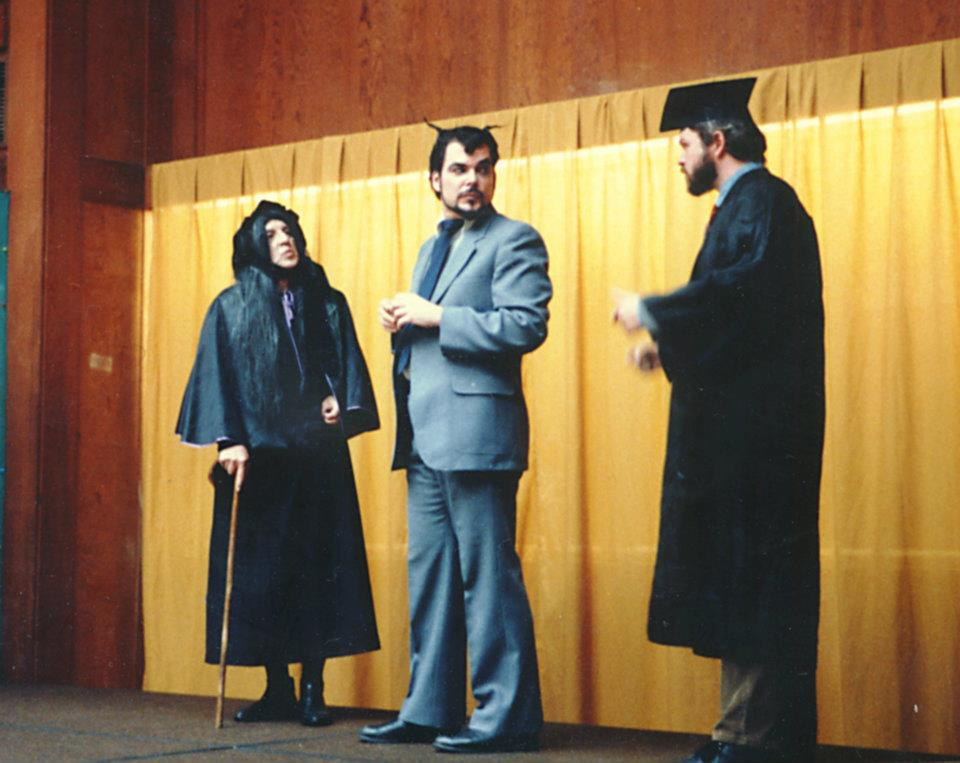
David Moyer as Mombi; Marc Lewis as the Wogglebug, and Rob Roy MacVeigh as Professor Knowitall from the 1987 Winkie convention.

James Patrick Doyle included a suite of music from the show on his 1999 CD, Before the Rainbow: The Original Music of Oz.

It was revived twice, once by Marc Lewis, who performed the revival at all three of the International Wizard of Oz Club’s major conventions in 1986-1987. It was based on elements of a surviving script and the sheet music of the songs that were available. It also added the songs "Alas For the Man without Brains" and "When You Love Love Love" from The Wizard of Oz, and "What Did The Woggle Bug Say?" (which was originally used as a song for a contest of the Queer Visitors from the Marvelous Land of Oz comic page) and "Just for Fun" from The Tik-Tok Man of Oz. The cast consisted of Oz fans who regularly appeared at Oz conventions at the time with Marc Lewis as the Woggle Bug, Robin Olderman as Tip, David Moyer as Mombi, John Fricke then Rob Roy MacVeigh as Professor Knowitall, Chris Sterling then Wayne Brown as Jack Pumpkinhead, Nadine Herman as Jinjur, and Eric Shanower as the regent.

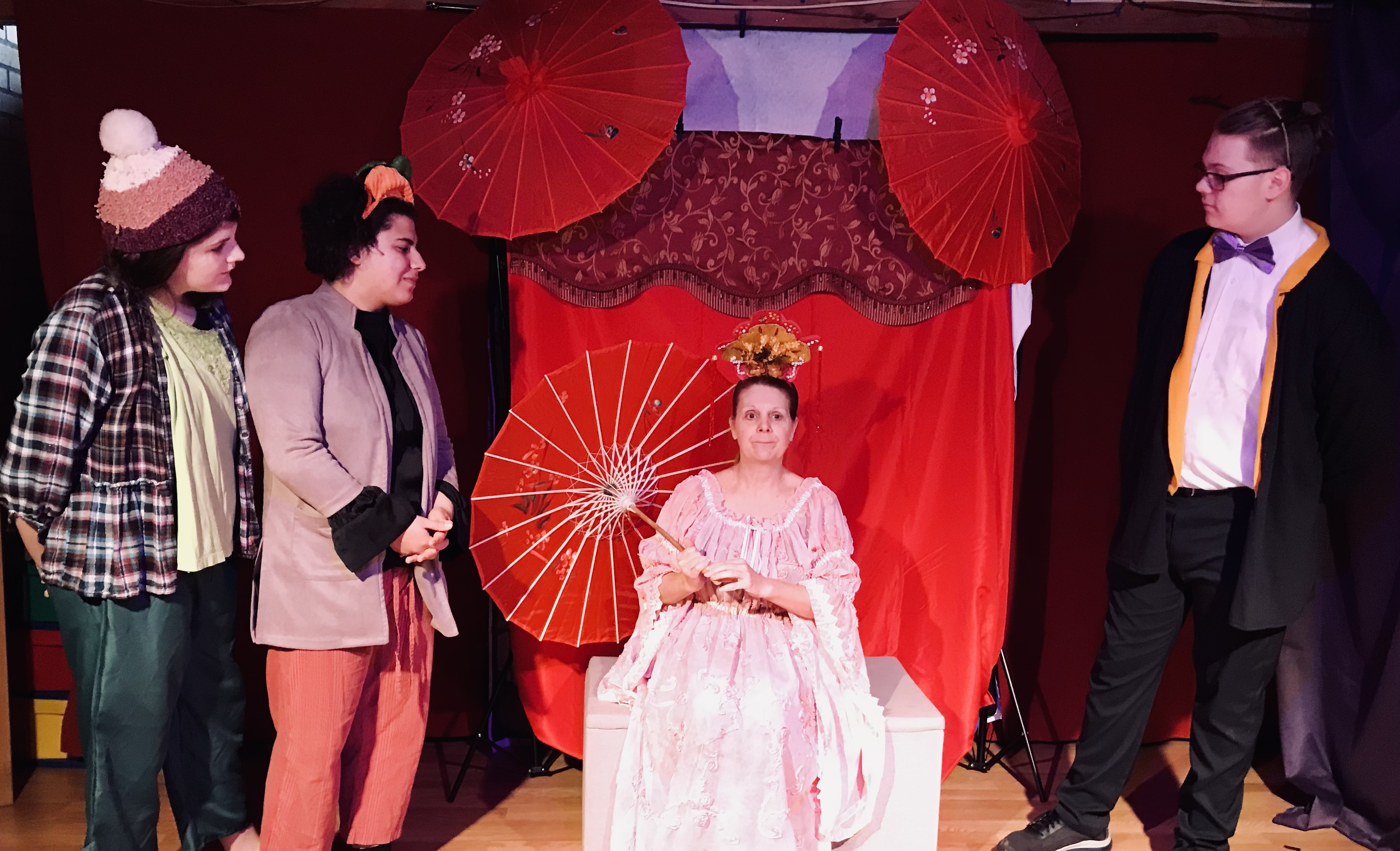
The Cast of 2023's TYA Revival.

The second revival was in 2023, when Offsite Connecticut Theatre staged a one hour TYA version with a newly rewritten script by T. Craft, additional music by Robert J. Adams for underscoring, and "What Did the Woggle Bug Say?" by Paul Tietjens as a finale.

In July 2024, Offsite Connecticut Theatre & Ike Studios announced a film version of The Woggle Bug set to premiere in 2025. The first teaser trailer was released at the Charloz festival in Charlotte, North Carolina. The film was released on YouTube as a direct to streaming film in February 2025. A revised and edited performance version of the play's script was published also in February 2025 and is available on Lulu.

== See also ==
- The Wizard of Oz (adaptations)
