= Mabel Hite =

American actress (1883–1912)

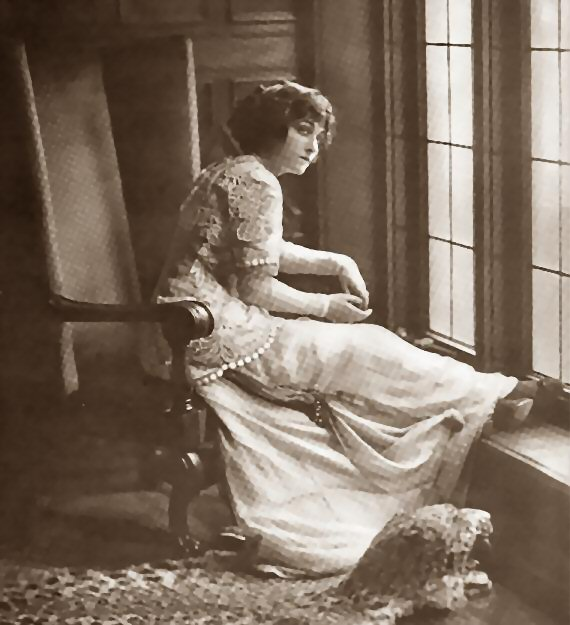
- Theatre Magazine, 1911
- Born: May 30, 1883; Ashland, Kentucky, U.S.
- Died: October 22, 1912 (aged 29); New York, New York, U.S.
- Other names: Mabel Hite Hamlin; Mabel Hite Donlin
- Occupations: Stage actress, vaudeville performer
- Spouse(s): Edward Ellis Hamlin (divorce); Mike Donlin (her death)

Mabel Hite (May 30, 1883 – October 22, 1912) was an American vaudeville comedian and musical comedy actress.

== Life and career ==
Hite was born in Ashland, Kentucky, on May 30, 1883, the daughter of Lewis and Elsie Hite. Her family relocated to Pocatello, Idaho, in the late 1880s and then Kansas City, Missouri, in the mid-1890s, where her father found employment at the Owl Drug Store. A native of Michigan, he later became the first vice-president of the newly formed Kansas City local of the National Association of Drug Clerks. Elsie Hite, originally from Illinois, would accompany her daughter throughout her early career which began at about age eleven in amateur theater as the 'Lord Chancellor' in Gilbert and Sullivan's comic opera Iolanthe.

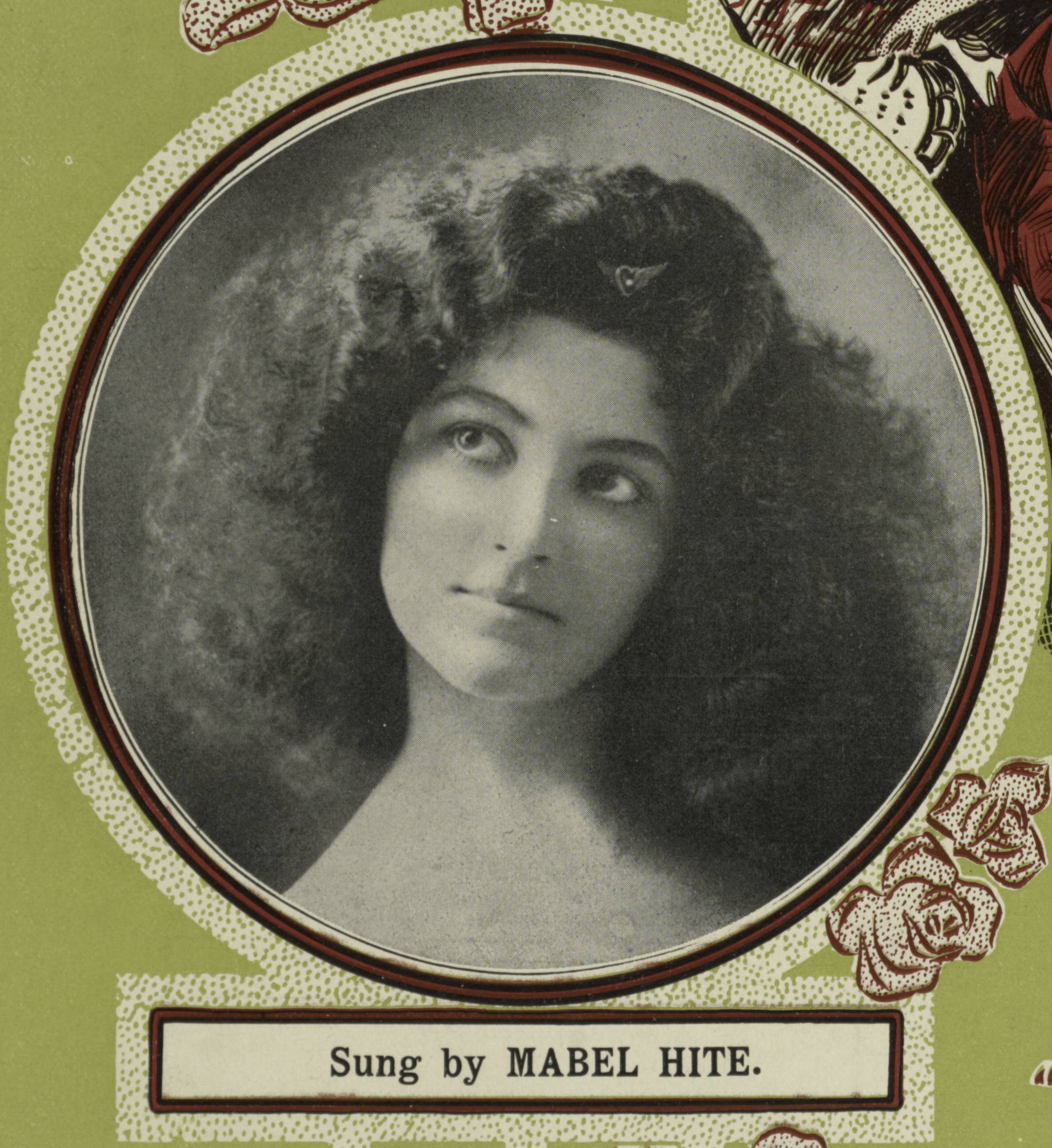
Mabel Hite crop from sheet music cover art

By the late 1890s Hite was a performer with the Fairmont Stock Company of Kansas City and in 1898 toured as 'Adele Ray' in James M. Martin's ragtime farce-comedy The Late Mr. Early. The following year she appeared with the Dunne and Ryley Company as the orphan 'Pony Luce' in Charles Hale Hoyt's A Milk White Flag. In the late summer of 1900 Hite was a soloist with Boston's The Howard's Own Show Company before embarking on a two-season tour as 'Estelle Coocoo' in the Morton-Kerker musical comedy The Telephone Girl. In 1902 she played the 'waif' in road productions of the Charles Dazey melodrama The Burglar and the Waif and the following year toured in the musical The Chaperons, as Phrosia.

Hite made her Broadway debut at the Knickerbocker Theatre on May 2, 1904, as 'Nerissa' in the musical comedy A Venetian Romance, and the following year at Chicago's Garrick Theatre she played 'Captain Prissy Ping' in L. Frank Baum's The Woggle-Bug. In 1905 it was rumored that she was to marry the athlete Arthur Duffey, and as she was a divorcee he would meet Pope Pius X in order to attain special dispensation to wed. The rumor proved false. Later that year she toured with the Frank L. Perley Opera Company opposite Viola Gillette in The Girl and the Bandit.

For the following season Hite joined forces with vaudevillian Walter Jones to form an act that met with success at vaudeville venues in and around New York City. On March 30, 1907, Hite starred as 'Tillie Day' in B. C. Whitney's production of A Knight for a Day at Chicago's Whitney Opera House and the next spring she came back to Broadway to play 'Martha Scraggs' at the Circle Theatre (Broadway at 60th St.) in The Merry-Go-Round.

Hite returned to vaudeville with her husband, professional baseball player Mike Donlin, in a series of comedic baseball skits. She last appeared in vaudeville in the spring of 1912 in a skit entitled Mabel Hite and Her Clowns. Her last Broadway appearance came the year before at Wallack's Theatre playing 'Norah' in the musical farce A Certain Party.

Hite died after a long struggle with intestinal cancer on October 22, 1912, at her mother's residence in New York City. She was survived by Donlin, her husband for six years. Hite had married once before, to Edward Ellis Hamlin, the son of a wealthy Marshall Field's executive, after a whirlwind courtship in 1901. Their union ended in 1905 after two years of divorce proceedings.
