= Charles Nelan =

American cartoonist

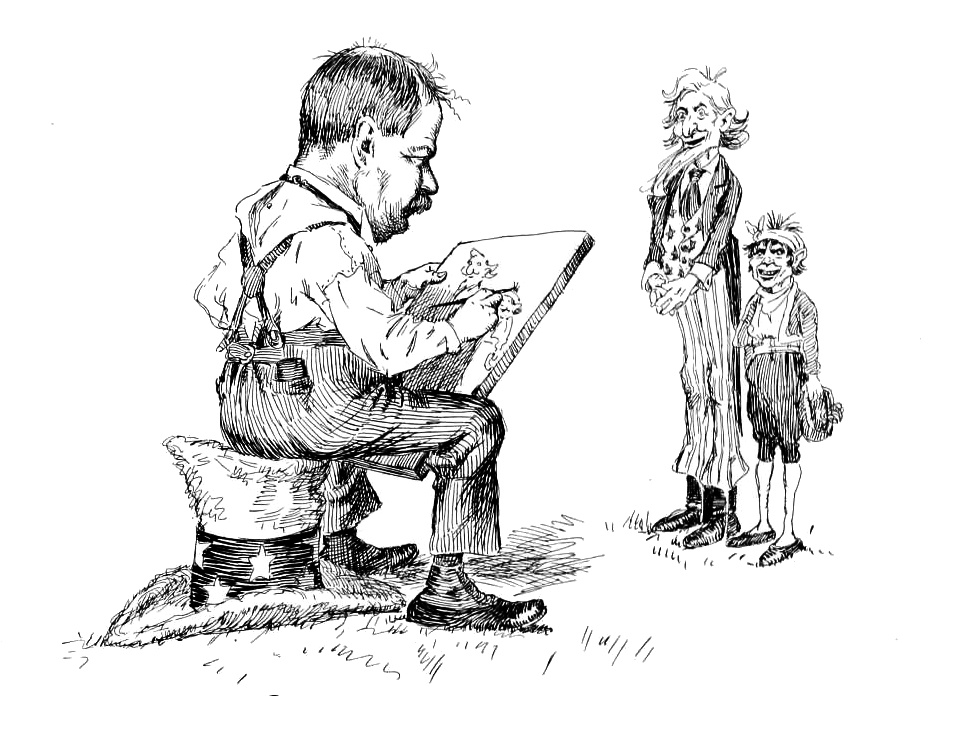
- Self-portrait of Nelan drawing Uncle Sam and a personification of Spain
- Born: April 10, 1859; Akron, Ohio
- Died: December 7, 1904 (aged 45); Cave Spring, Georgia
- Occupation: Cartoonist

Charles F. Nelan (April 10, 1859 – December 7, 1904) was an American artist and political cartoonist, known for his cartoons on the Spanish–American War, some 135 of which appeared in the New York Herald. His work in the Philadelphia North American was often critical of Samuel Pennypacker and Matthew Quay. Nelan's work also helped solidify the image of Uncle Sam as a personification of the United States.
