= Ike Morgan =

American newspaper illustrator (1871–1913)

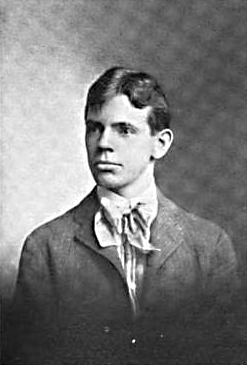
- Born: Isaac Morgan; June 28, 1871; Grand Tower, Illinois, US
- Died: September 13, 1913 (aged 42); Brooklyn, New York, US
- Education: St. Louis School of Fine Arts
- Known for: Newspaper illustrator

Isaac Morgan (June 28, 1871 – September 13, 1913) was a well-known newspaper illustrator for several big newspapers in Chicago and New York.

== Biography ==
Morgan was labeled "well-educated" by newspaper colleagues. He was fluent in Latin and an aficionado for the theater. He was born in Grand Tower, Illinois, and grew up in St. Louis, where he graduated from the St. Louis School of Fine Arts. Morgan was a good friend and colleague with L. Frank Baum and shared a studio with William Wallace Denslow, both joint creators of The Wizard of Oz. Morgan provided pictures for Baum's American Fairy Tales (1901), and illustrated The Woggle-Bug Book (1905). By one account, it was Morgan who introduced L. Frank Baum to Paul Tietjens, the composer for The Wizard of Oz and other stage projects. Both W.W. Denslow and Ike Morgan were influenced by Japanese woodcuts on French prints. Morgan developed his own pen-and-ink style and took pride with his color work in the Woggle-Bug Book, Boylan's Kids of Many Colors and in Steps to Nowhere. His bold illustrations and colors used in various shapes and sizes emphasized his drawings in a dramatic way, rather than limiting their natural scope, so widely incorporated by other illustrators. Morgan was commissioned often for his paintings, theatrical posters and magazine covers.

Ike was married to Mrs. Pauline H. Swain Morgan. According to Denslow's biography it was Denslow who had hosted Morgan's wedding reception while his former roommate Paul Tietjans performed some of the music.

Ike Morgan died at his home in Brooklyn on September 13, 1913.

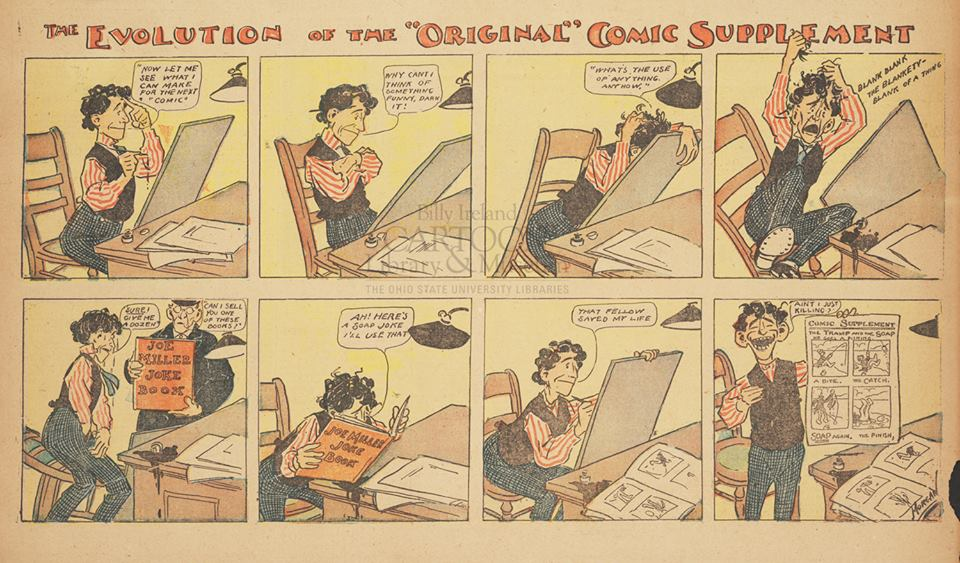
Morgan cartoon strip

== Sources ==
- Greene, D.G.; Hearn, M.P. (1976). W. W. Denslow. Clarke Historical Library, Central Michigan University. ISBN 9780916699093.
- Billy Ireland Cartoon Museum
- American Fairy Tales, 1901, written by L. Frank Baum, illustrations Ike Morgan
- The St. Louis Republic, 1901
