= The Gingerbread Man =

Fairy tale

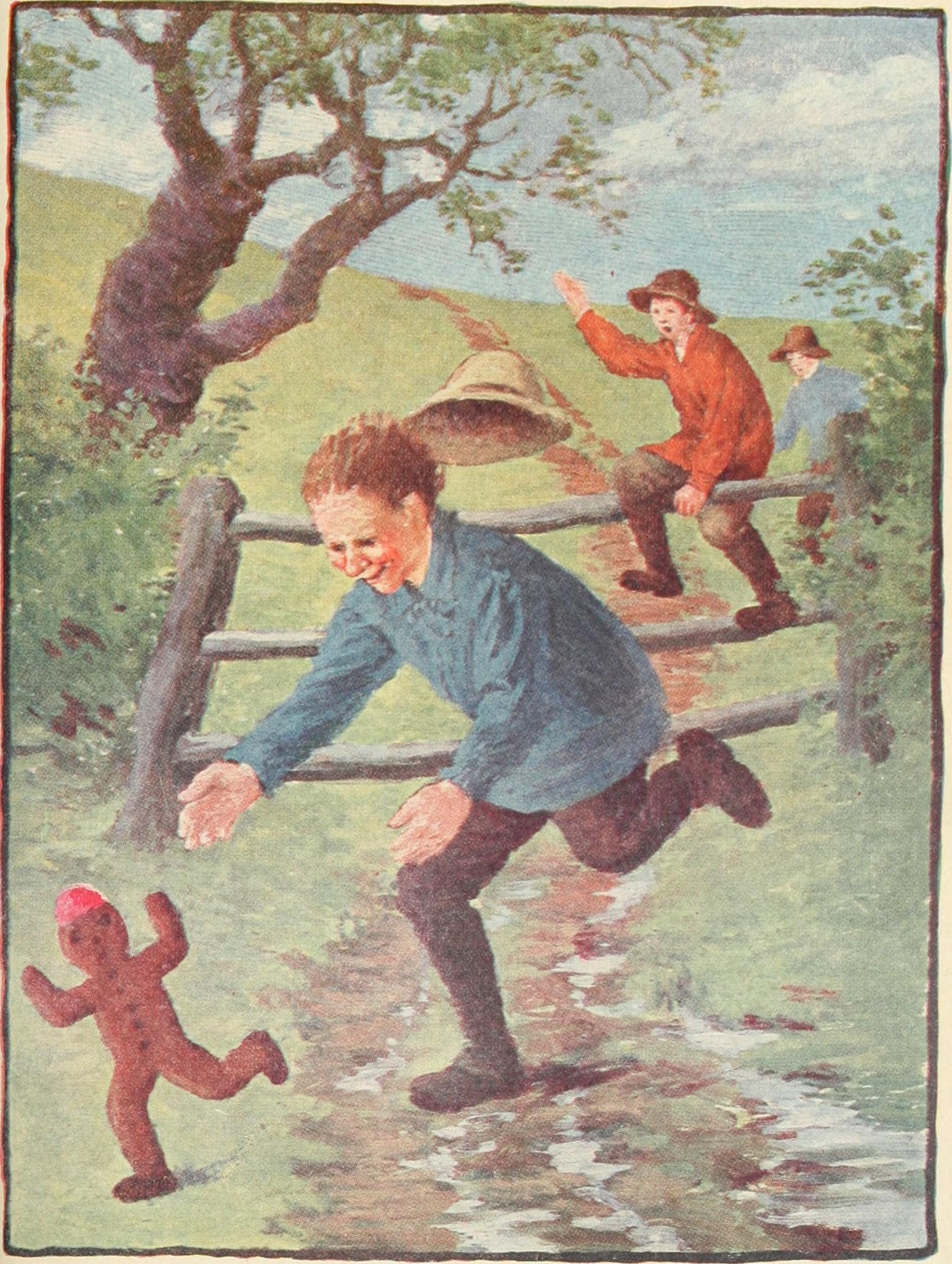
1918 illustration for the tale

"The Gingerbread Man" (also known as "The Gingerbread Boy") is a traditional American fairy tale about a gingerbread man's misadventures while fleeing from various people that culminates in the titular character being eaten by a fox. "The Gingerbread Boy" first appeared in print in The United States Of America in the May 1875 issue of St. Nicholas Magazine in a cumulative tale which, like "The Little Red Hen", depends on repetitious scenes featuring an ever-growing cast of characters for its effect. According to the reteller of the tale, "A girl from Maine told it to my children. It interested them so much that I thought it worth preserving. I asked where she found it and she said an old lady told it to her in her childhood."

== 1875 story ==
In the 1875 St. Nicholas tale, a childless old woman bakes a gingerbread man (a gingerbread cookie (or biscuit) in the shape of a man) who leaps from her oven and runs away. The woman and her husband give chase, but are unable to catch him. The gingerbread man then outruns several farm workers, farm men, and farm animals.

I've run away from a little old woman,
A little old man,
And I can run away from you, I can!

The tale ends with a fox catching and eating the gingerbread man who cries as he is devoured, "I'm quarter gone...I'm half gone...I'm three-quarters gone...I'm all gone!"

== Variations on the 1875 story ==
"The Gingerbread Man" remains a common subject for American children's literature into the 21st century. The retellings often omit the original ending ("I'm quarter gone... I'm half gone... I'm three-quarters gone... I'm all gone!") and make other changes. In some variations, the fox feigns deafness, drawing the Gingerbread Man closer and closer until the fox snatches and devours him. In other versions, the Gingerbread Man halts in his flight at a riverbank, and after accepting the fox's offer to ferry him across, is convinced by the fox to move ever-forward toward the fox's mouth.

In some retellings, the Gingerbread Man taunts his pursuers with the famous line:

Run, run as fast as you can!
You can't catch me.
I'm the Gingerbread Man!

== Folk tales ==
The character of the runaway food exists in folktales. Folklorist D. L. Ashliman located it across Germany, the British Isles, and Eastern Europe, as well as the US. Jack Haney also located it in Slavdom and in Northern Europe.

"The Pancake" ("Pannekaken") was collected by Peter Asbjornsen and Jørgen Moe and published in Norske Folkeeventyr (1842–1844). Ten years later, the German brothers Carl and Theodor Colshorn collected "The Big, Fat Pancake" ("Vom dicken fetten Pfannekuchen") from the Salzdahlum region and published the tale in Märchen und Sagen, no. 57, (1854). In 1894, Karl Gander collected "The Runaway Pancake". "The Roule Galette" is a similar story from France. A similar Russian tale, "Kolobok" ("Колобо́к"), tells of a round bread who runs away from an old lady and old man to face different forest animals such as a hare, wolf, and bear. It avoids them all while singing a repetitive song. It meets a fox who tricks it and eats it.

A variation of this trope is found in the Hungarian tale "The Little Dumpling" ("A kis gömböc"), and contrary to the title the main character is not a dumpling, but the Hungarian version of head cheese (which is referred to as "gömböc" ("dumpling") in some regions of Hungary). In the tale it is the gömböc that eats the others; it first consumes the family that "made" it, and then, rolling on the road, it eats various others – including a whole army – the last of whom is a swineherd. His knife opens the gömböc from the inside, and the people run home. In another variation, the gömböc bursts after eating too many people. A similar Russian tale, "The Clay-Boy" ("Гли́няный па́рень", Glínyanyĭ párenʹ), is about an old childless couple who make a child out of clay who first eats all their food, then them, then a number of people, until he meets a goat who offers to jump right into his mouth, but instead uses the opportunity to ram the Clay-Boy, shattering him and freeing everyone. The Czech folk tale "Otesánek" (and the 2000 movie with the same name) follows a similar plot.

Joseph Jacobs published "Johnny-Cake" in his English Fairy Tales (1890), basing his tale on a version found in the American Journal of Folk-Lore. Jacobs' johnnycake rolls rather than runs, and the fox tricks him by pretending to be deaf and unable to hear his taunting verse. In "The Wee Bannock" from More English Fairy Tales (1894), Jacobs records a Scottish tale with a bannock as hero.

== Derivations and modern works ==
The musical The Gingerbread Man (music by Alfred Baldwin Sloane, book and lyrics by Frederic Ranken) opened at the Liberty Theatre on Broadway on Christmas Day 1905. It ran for sixteen performances over a two week period at that theatre; closing on January 6, 1906. That same production returned to Broadway for sixteen further performances at the New York Theatre from May 14, 1906 - May 26, 1906. The massive production then moved to Chicago with most of its New York cast and continued a successful tour of smaller venues in the U.S. for at least another four years. In this show the titular character, The Gingerbread Man, is in reality the King of Bon Bon Land who has been transformed into gingerbread by the evil sorcerer Machevelius Fudge. The hit song of the show, used the Gingerbread Man's nickname "John Dough" ("John Dough" being another term for a gingerbread man that was current at the time), for its title. The Gingerbread Man was played by crowd favorite Eddie Redway and caught the attention of audiences and critics. The gingerbread man idea was also heavily promoted by the producers: 25,000 dough statuettes were given away in New York City to promote the show. This John Dough had few resemblances to the Gingerbread Man of the 1875 story described above. He claims to be a scapegoat rather than a troublemaker: "They are looking for me high and low, I'm wanted for that, I'm wanted for this, For any old thing that has gone amiss." Ranken's John Dough gingerbread man does not care that he is about to be eaten; he seems to fear obscurity more: "A little boy buys me with a cent . . . And removes an arm or leg or two, As down his throat I gently float, How can that hopeful know, Unless he is told, That he's stowed in his hold, The original John Dough."

The Gingerbread Man appears as a popular supporting character in the Shrek films, where he is voiced by Conrad Vernon (see List of Shrek (franchise) characters). The Gingerbread Man is a villain in the Nursery Crime series by Jasper Fforde.

== Bibliography ==
- Bordman, Gerald Martin; Norton, Richard (2010). American Musical Theatre: A Chronicle. Oxford University Press. ISBN 9780199729708.
- Dietz, Dan (2022). "The Gingerbread Man". The Complete Book of 1900s Broadway Musicals. Rowman & Littlefield Publishers. ISBN 9781538168943.
- Bloom, Ken (1996). "The Gingerbread Man". American Song: A-S. Schirmer Books. ISBN 9780028645735.
