= Excelsior, Jr. =

Play

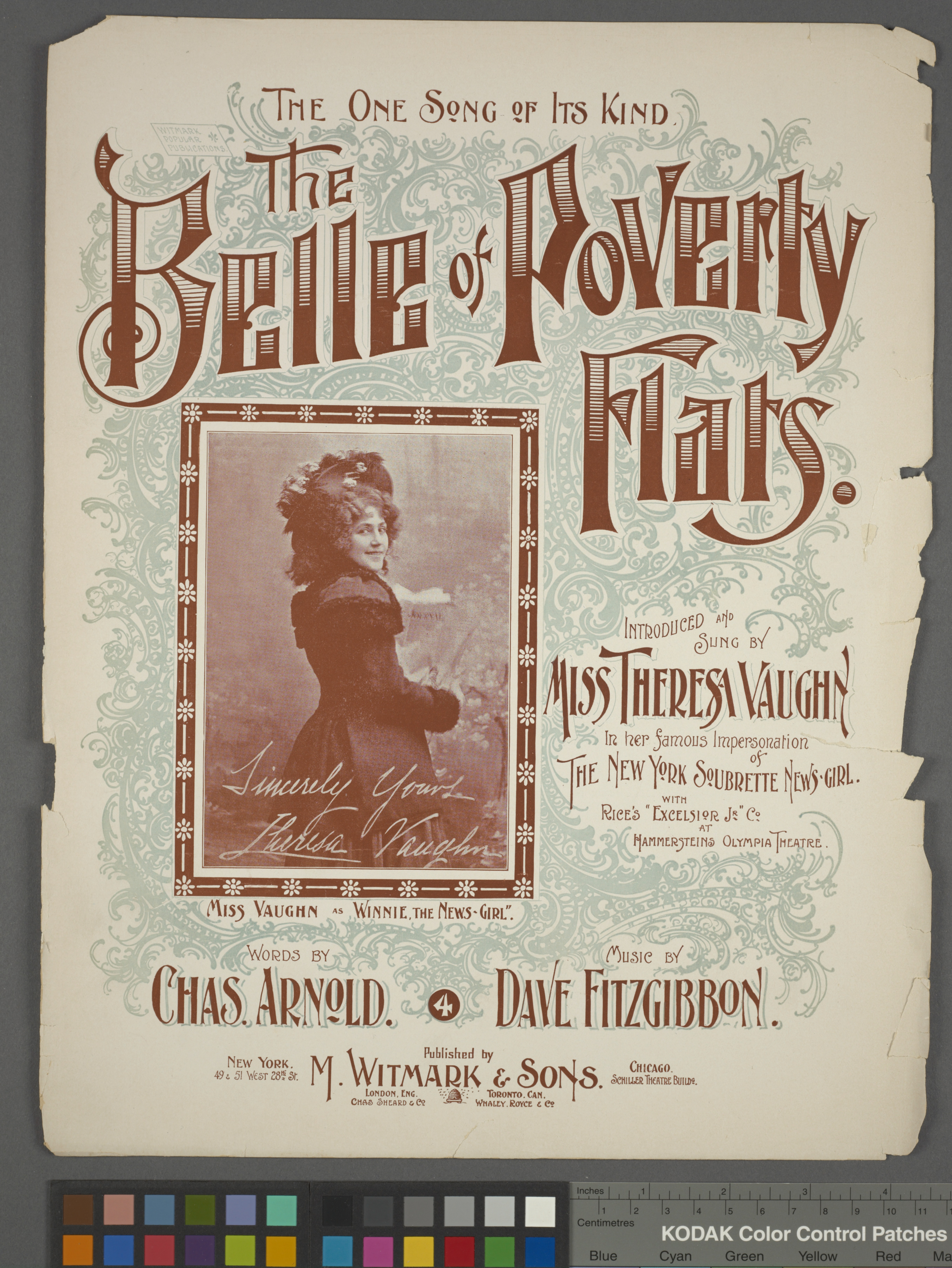
- Sheet music for a song from the production, sung by Theresa Vaughn
- Original language: English
- Genre: Musical comedy

Premiere
- Date premiered: November 25, 1895 (Broadway)

Excelsior, Jr. is an 1895 musical comedy with music by George Lowell Tracy, A. Baldwin Sloane, and Edward E. Rice, and also with lyrics by Robert Ayres Barnet.

After playing in New Haven, it debuted on Broadway to a great fanfare as the first production at Hammerstein's Olympia on November 25, 1895. It ran for 144 performances at the Olympia, and then moved for 24 more performances at the Broadway Theatre starting on March 30, 1896.

The work is a parody based on the poem Excelsior by Henry Wadsworth Longfellow. The Sun's opening night review called it "good entertainment, notwithstanding the worthlessness of the play itself, and the saving of it from failure was due altogether to the interpolations by the amusing members of the company." The play was the largest success of the 1895-96 Broadway season. The interpolated songs rotated over time, which was not an uncommon tactic of the period in this type of fare to keep up audience interest.

The cast included Irene Perry, Theresa Vaughn, Fay Templeton, Walter Jones, Charles Bigelow, David Abraham, Marie Cahill, and Richard Carle.

Excelsior, Jr. moved to the Broadway Theatre so that Hammerstein could debut his own Marguerite in February 1896--that successor performed much worse and helped lead to Hammerstein's bankruptcy.
