= Alfred Baldwin Sloane =

American composer and songwriter

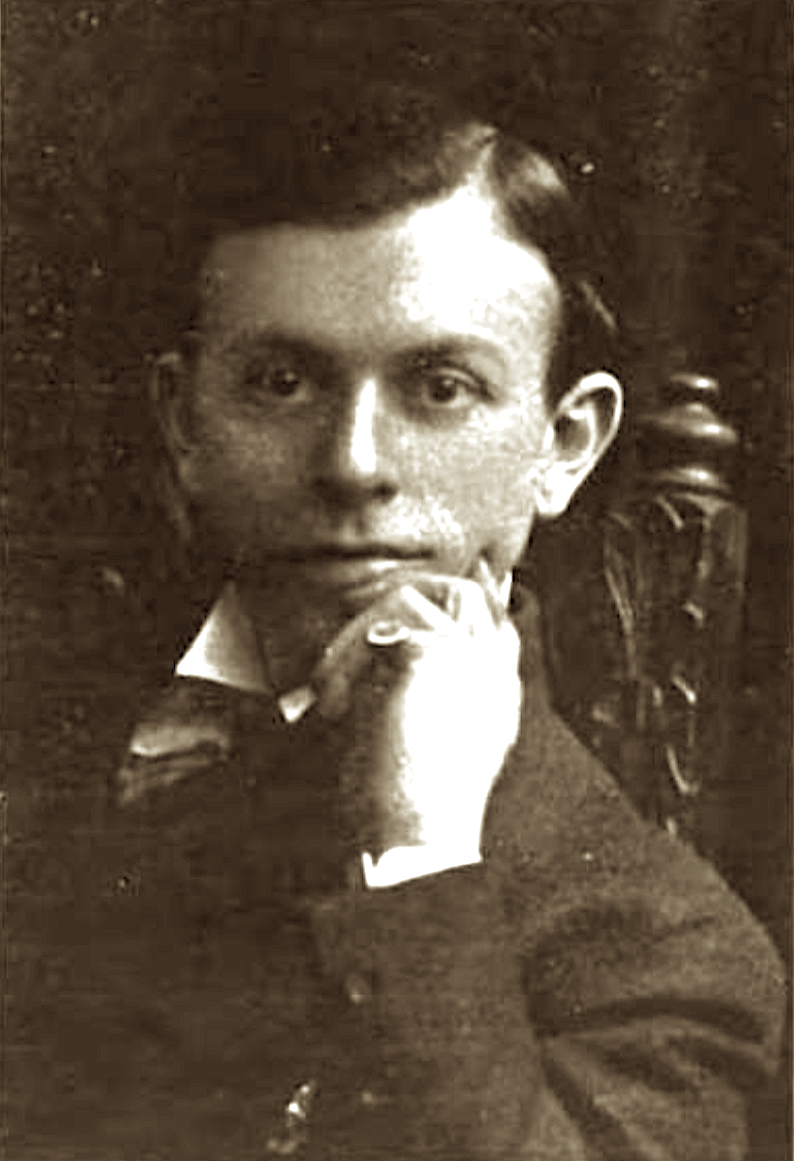
Alfred Baldwin Sloane, published in 1906.

Alfred Baldwin Sloane, often given as A. Baldwin Sloane, (28 August 1872, Baltimore – 21 February 1925, Red Bank, New Jersey) was the most prolific songwriter for Broadway musical comedies in the United States at the beginning of the 20th century. Despite his output and success during his lifetime, none of his music has had enduring popularity. Two of his most popular songs were "When You Ain't Got No Money You Needn't Come Around" and "Coming Through the Rye". His most successful hit tune was “Heaven Will Protect the Working Girl" which was first performed by Marie Dressler in the 1910 show Tillie's Nightmare.

== Early life in Baltimore ==
Alfred Baldwin Sloane was born in Baltimore, Maryland on August 28, 1872. He was the son of Francis James Sloane and Emma Sloane (née Baldwin); both of whom came from families with musical heritage. His first music lessons were from his mother, and he also studied privately with music teachers in his native city. Despite the strong music background of his parents, they strongly objected to him pursuing a career in music.

Sloane was educated in the Baltimore City Public School System. His parents wished him to pursue a career in business, and in his youth he worked in his native city as an apprentice at a wholesale dry goods dealer. He lost his job there after spending most of his time at work surreptitiously composing music on boxes and other miscellaneous items. He also worked nights as an usher at the Academy of Music, and spent some time as the secretary for a company managing a Baltimore cemetery.

Sloane's interest in lyric theatre led him to take a leading role in the founding of an amateur dramatic group in Baltimore, the Paint and Powder Club (PPC). The club originally began in 1892 at the Maryland Banjo and Mandolin Club with Sloane, Harry Price, Rowland West, and Reece Cassard as its founding members. The club expanded its scope and was transformed into the PPC not long after. Sloane's first songs were written for amateur productions in Baltimore with this group. His first score was written the PPC's production Mustapha; an opera for which Sloane wrote both the music and libretto. It was given its premiere in February 1894 at Ford's Grand Opera House with Sloane himself portraying the title role of the Turkish sultan.

One of Sloane's first songs, "While Strolling Through the Forrest", was published in 1894. In 1895 he ended his connection with the PPC, and founded another amateur Baltimore performing group, the Rouge et Blanc Club. He wrote his second stage work for this group, the burlesque Midas, which was given its premiere at Albaugh's Lyceum Theatre on 5 February 1895 with Sloane once again portraying the title role. His brother, Francis James Sloane Jr., was also in the cast in the role of Antinous.

== New York composer ==
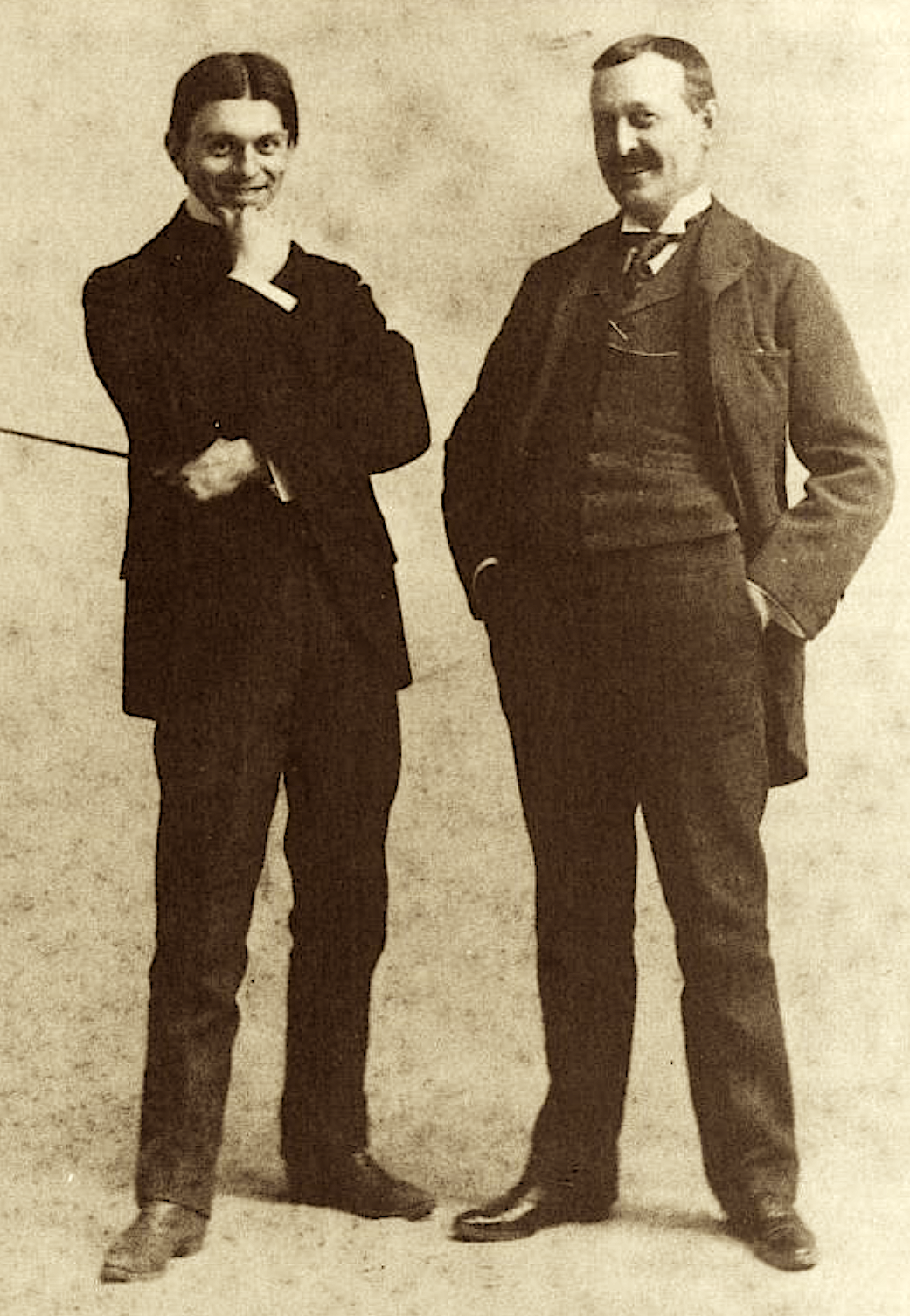
A. Baldwin Sloane and Robert Barnet during rehearsals of Jack and the Beanstalk in 1896.

Sloane moved to New York City not long after the premiere of Midas in Baltimore in 1895. The theatre impresario Edward E. Rice caught a performance of the work while in Baltimore with a touring show he was producing, Robert Barnet's 1492. Impressed by what he heard, he met with Sloane and bought the rights to Midas from him. A number of his songs form this work were interpolated into Rice's next musical Excelsior, Jr.. These included the songs "The Alpine Horn", "Grandpa's Hat", "Hush, Silence", "I Love You Evaline; I'm a Very Fly Conductor", and "My Little Sunday Girl" among others.

The success of Excelsior, Jr., first in Boston and later on Broadway, launched Sloane's career in the New York theatre scene. His first original score for the Broadway stage was in 1896 with the musical Jack and the Beanstalk; a work which featured several well known fairy tale and nursery rhyme characters. It too used lyrics by Barnet and was mounted at the Casino Theatre by producers Klaw and Erlanger. The work was very successful financially between its run in New York and a subsequent national tour, and significantly raised the profile and popularity of actress Madge Lessing in the title role of Jack.

In New York, Sloane quickly adapted his compositional style to what was then the current trend of the Tin Pan Alley publishing houses; a shift which enabled him to be gainfully employed by having his songs interpolated into shows both on the musical stage and in vaudeville. These included several songs by Sloane incorporated into the musical Papa's Wife (1899) which starred Anna Held. His first big hit was the 1898 song "When You Ain't Got No Money, (Well You Needn't Come Round)" which was popularized on the stage by May Irwin. His biggest success as a songwriter was the tune "Heaven Will Protect the Working Girl," which Marie Dressler introduced in Tillie's Nightmare (1910), but none of his songs found enduring popularity.

In 1900 he married Mae Auwerda. His most successful work as a composer in terms of quality was The Mocking Bird (1902).

After 1912, Sloane's composition output declined as he embarked on a second successful career as an exhibition dancer. He did provide much of the music for The Greenwich Village Follies of 1919 and The Greenwich Village Follies of 1920. He wrote one of his musicals, Lady Teazle, for Lillian Russell when she was at the height of her national popularity. His last score, for the 1925 Broadway production China Rose, was in production at the time of his death. China Rose had been produced in Boston, by Christmas Eve, 1924.

While in the home of his daughter, Mrs. June H. Brackett, Alfred Baldwin Sloane died of heart disease at the age of 52 in Red Bank, New Jersey on 21 February 1925.

At the time of his death, Sloane was the president of Composers' Publishing Company and vice president of Authors and Composers Publishing Company.

He was a member of The Lambs, the Green Room Club, and Old Strollers. He married Lucille Mae Auwerda in Manhattan on February 15, 1900. They had one daughter – June Augusta Sloane (1901–1984) – who married Isaac Hosford Brackett (1901–1976).

== Musicals and operettas with scores by Sloane ==
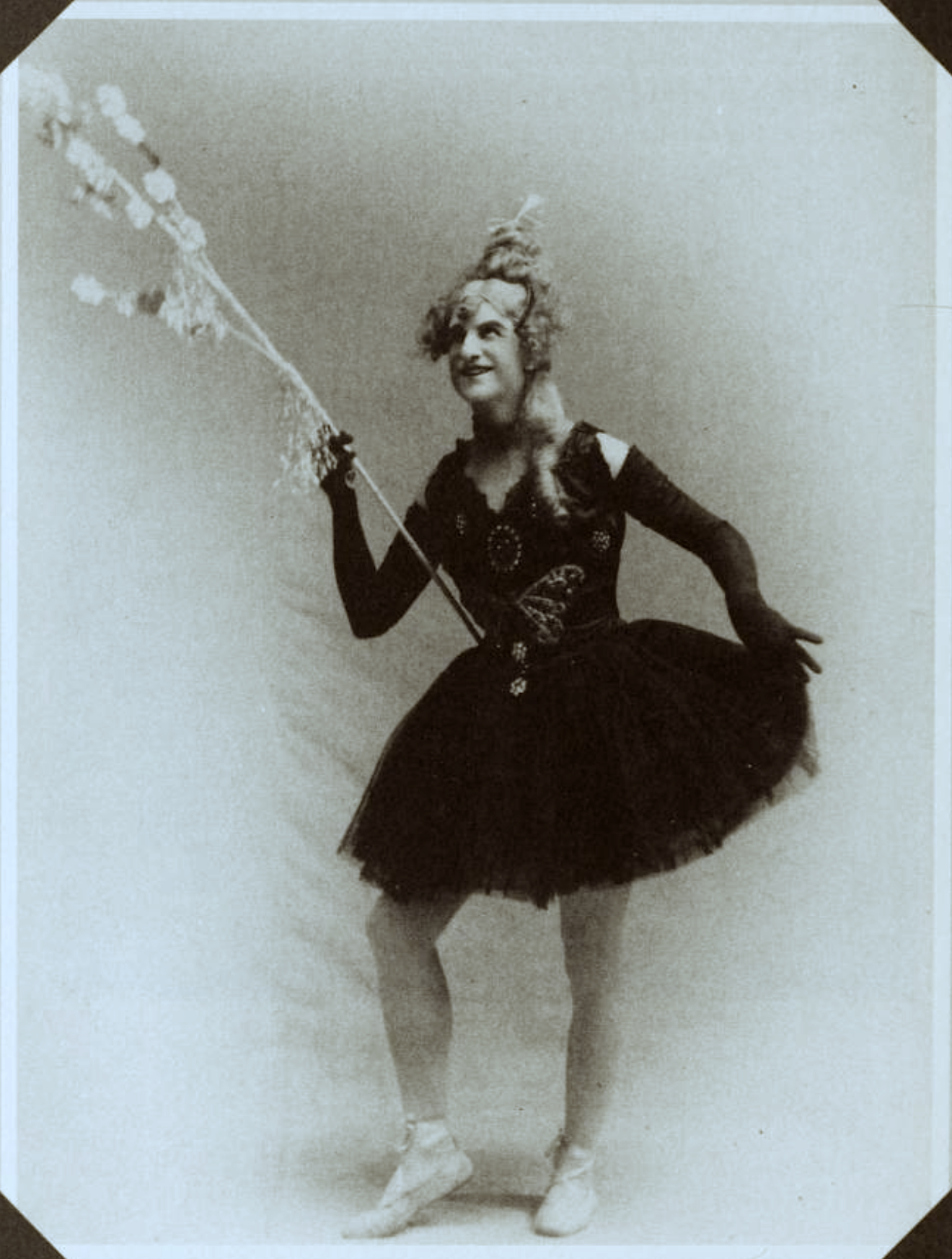
Louis Benton as Queen of the Fairies in The Strange Adventures of Jack and the Beanstalk (1896).

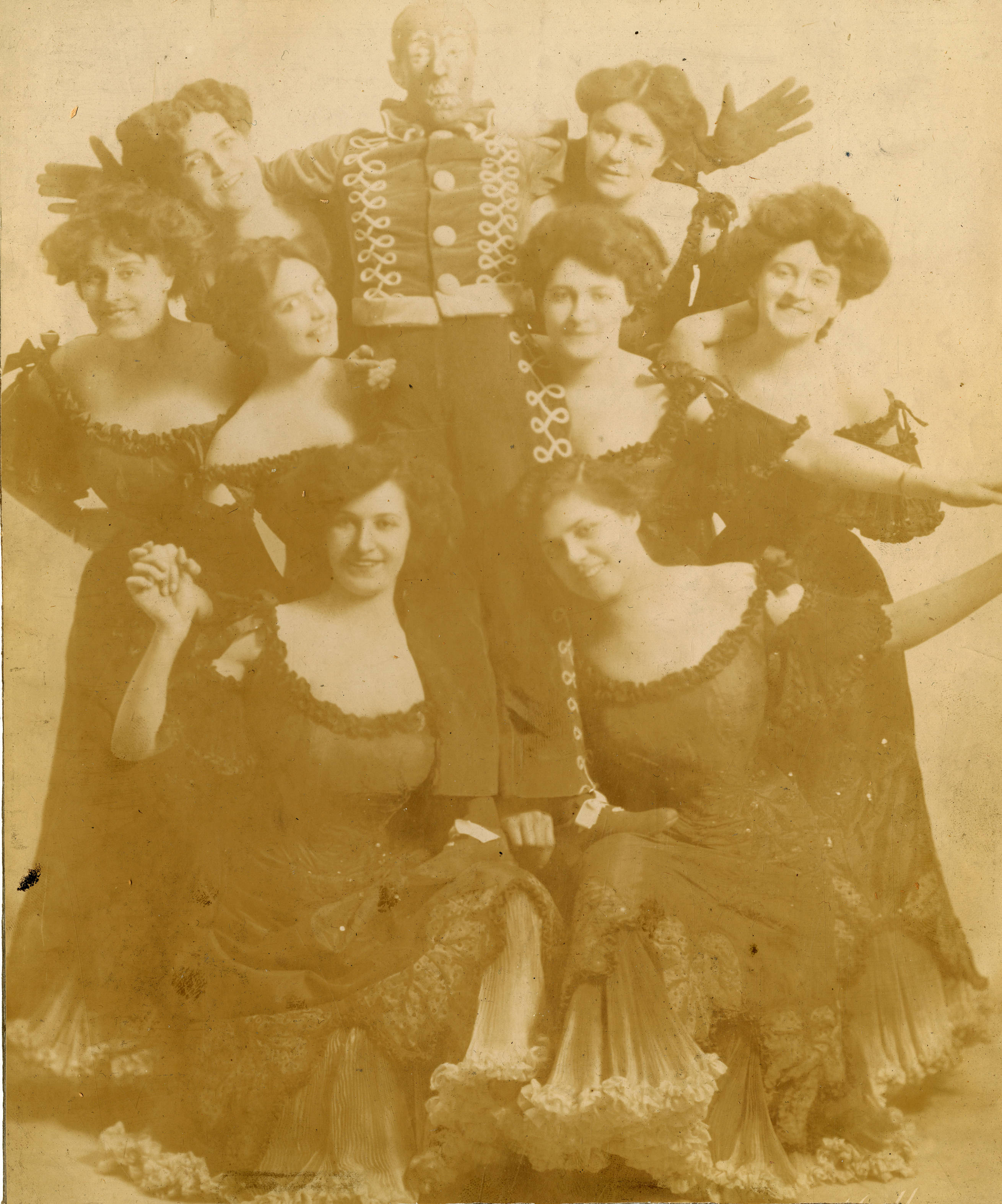
Still from "The Gingerbread Man" 1909 production, Seattle, WA

0–9
Work	Type	Year	Premiere	Music	Libretto/Book/Lyrics	Notes	Reference
Mustapha	operetta in two acts	1894	Baltimore: Ford's Grand Opera House, February 5, 1894	Sloane	Libretto by Sloane	Performed by the Pain and Powder Club	
Midas	operatic burlesque in three acts	1895	Baltimore: Albaugh's Lyceum Theatre, February 5, 1895	Sloane	Libretto by Sloane	Performed by the Rouge et Blanc Club. Toured by them to the National Theatre, Washington, D.C.	
The Strange Adventures of Jack and the Beanstalk (also known as Jack and the Beanstalk)	"fairy extravaganza in three acts"	1896	New Haven, Connecticut: Hyperion Theater, October 26, 1896	Sloane	Libretto by Robert Barnet	Production moved to Broadway's Casino Theatre where it opened on November 2, 1896. It subsequently had a successful tour.	
Simple Simon	burlesque	1897	Boston: Tremont Theatre, February 8, 1897	Sloane and George Lowell Tracy	Libretto by Robert Barnet	Performed by The Cadets	
The Marquis of Michigan	musical farce in three acts	1897	Washington, D.C.: Columbia Theatre, August 2, 1897	Sloane	book and lyrics by Glen MacDonough and Edward W. Townsend	Performed at the Collingwood Opera House in Poughkeepsie, New York and elsewhere before arriving at Broadway's Bijou Theatre on September 21, 1898	
The Queen's Fan	operetta in one act	1899	New York City: Proctor's Twenty-Third Street Theatre, March 6, 1899	Sloane	libretto by George Totten Smith	The production starred a group of three performers known as the Dresden Trio and toured the United States in performances at theaters owned by Benjamin Franklin Keith.	
Broadway to Tokio	musical in three acts	1900	Broadway: New York Theatre, January 23, 1900	Sloane	lyrics and book by George V. Hobart and Louis Harrison	Ended its Broadway run at the Olympia Theatre on April 7, 1900 after 88 performances. The production then toured to Philadelphia, Boston, and Brooklyn.	
Aunt Hannah	musical in three acts	1900	Broadway: Bijou Theatre, February 22, 1900	Sloane	lyrics by Clay M. Greene; book by Matthew J. Royal	Ended its Broadway run at the Bijou Theatre on March 10, 1900 after 21 performances.	
A Million Dollars	musical in three acts	1900	Broadway: New York Theatre, September 27, 1900	Sloane	lyrics by George V. Hobart; book co-authored by Hobart and Louis Harrison	Ended its Broadway run on October 20, 1900 after 28 performances.	
Nell-Go-In	"bill of a burlesque, ballet, and vaudeville in three acts"	1900	Broadway: New York Theatre, October 31, 1900	Sloane	lyrics and book by George V. Hobart	Ended its Broadway run on November 17, 1900 after 25 performances.	
Madge Smith, Attorney	musical play in three acts	1900	Broadway: Bijou Theatre, December 10, 1900	Sloane, Dave Reed, Francis Bryant, Ernest Hogan, Theodore H. Northrup, and James O'Dea	book by Ramsay Morris; lyrics by many authors	Transferred to the Grand Opera House in Manhattan where it ended its New York run in March 1901 after 46 performances.	
After Office Hours		1900	December 24, 1900	Sloane	Closed May 11, 1901	Staged with The Giddy Throng	
The Giddy Throng		1900	December 24, 1900	Sloane	Closed May 11, 1901	Staged with After Office Hours	
In A Japanese Garden	musical in one act	1901	Broadway: Casino Theatre, May 3, 1901	Sloane	lyrics and book by William Gill		
The King's Carnival	musical burlesque in two acts	1901	Broadway: New York Theatre, May 13, 1901	Sloane	lyrics and book by Sydney Rosenfeld	Broadway production closed on October 12, 1901 after a total of 102 performances	
Fun on the Beach	musical in one act	1901	Broadway: Cherry Blossom Grove, August 4, 1901	Sloane	lyrics and book by George V. Hobart		
The Supper Club	musical in three acts	1901	Broadway: Winter Garden Theatre, December 23, 1901	Sloane, Mae Anwerda Sloane, J. Rosamond Johnson, Robert Cole, Ben Jerome, William Penn, Will D. Cobb and Gus Edwards	book by Sydney Rosenfeld; lyrics by Sydney Rosenfeld, A. Baldwin Sloane, Mae Anwerda Sloane, J. Rosamond Johnson, Robert Cole, Ben Jerome, William Penn, Will D. Cobb and Gus Edwards	Broadway production closed on January 25, 1902 after 40 performances	
The Hall of Fame	musical in three acts	1902	Broadway: New York Theatre, February 5, 1902	Sloane	lyrics by George V. Hobart; book by Sydney Rosenfeld	Broadway production closed on June 4, 1902 after 137 performances	
The Belle of Broadway	musical in one act followed by a vaudeville program	1902	Broadway: New York Winter Garden Theatre, March 15, 1902	Sloane	lyrics by George V. Hobart; book by William H. Post	Broadway production closed on March 29, 1902 after 17 performances	
The Wizard of Oz	musical in three acts	1902	Chicago: Chicago Grand Opera House, June 16, 1902	Paul Tietjens and Sloane were the primary composers although others also contributed music	lyrics and book by L. Frank Baum; additional lyrics contributed by others	Original production toured including a lengthy run on Broadway at the Majestic Theatre where it opened on January 20, 1903. It closed there after 293 performances on October 3, 1903. The production later returned for a second Broadway run at the Majestic Theatre from March 21, 1904 – November 25, 1905 where ran for an additional 171 performances.	
The Mocking Bird	opera in three acts	1902	Syracuse, New York: Wieting Opera House, November 7, 1902	Sloane	libretto by Sydney Rosenfeld	Broadway run at the Bijou Theatre from November 10, 1902 – Jun 8, 1903. Considered Sloane's best work.	
Sergeant Kitty	opera in two acts	1903	Brooklyn, New York: Montauk Theatre, November 16, 1903	Sloane	libretto by R.H. Burnside	Broadway run at Daly's Theatre from January 18, 1904 – March 12, 1904	
Lady Teazle	comic opera in two acts	1904	Baltimore, Maryland: Academy of Music, December 19, 1904	Sloane	Libretto by John Kendrick Bangs and Roderic C. Penfield based on Richard Brinsley Sheridan's The School for Scandal	Broadway run at the Casino Theatre from December 24, 1904 – February 11, 1905.	
All Around Chicago	"musical extravaganza" in twelve scenes	1905	Chicago: McVicker's Theater, April 30, 1905	Sloane	book and lyrics by Frederic Ranken	Never performed in New York	
The Gingerbread Man	musical in two acts	1905	Malden, Massachusetts: Auditorium Theatre, November 15, 1905	Sloane	book and lyrics by Frederic Ranken	Opened on Broadway at the Liberty Theatre on Christmas Day 1905	
Seeing New York	comic opera in one act	1906	Broadway: Jardin de Paris, June 5, 1906	Sloane	libretto by Joseph Hart and Clifton Crawford	Broadway run closed on August 18, 1906 after 75 performances.	
The Great Decide	burlesque in three scenes	1906	Broadway: Lew Fields Theatre, November 15, 1906	Gustav Kerker and Sloane	book and lyrics by Joseph Herbert	Parody of William Vaughn Moody's The Great Divide. Broadway run closed on December 29, 1906 after 53 performances.	
The Mimic and the Maid	musical in three acts	1906	New Haven, Connecticut: Hyperion Theater, December 28, 1906	Sloane	lyrics and book by Allen Lowe	Brief Broadway run at the Bijou Theatre on January 11 and 12, 1907	
Li'l Mose	musical	1908	Atlantic City: April 20, 1908	Sloane	lyrics and book by Owen Davis and George Totten Smith	Never performed in New York	
Lo	musical	1909	Milwaukee: August 29, 1909	Sloane	book and lyrics by O. Henry (pseudonym of William Sydney Porter) & Franklin Pierce Adams	Never performed in New York	
Tillie's Nightmare	musical in two acts	1910	Chicago: Great Northern Theatre, January 2, 1910	Sloane	book and lyrics by Edgar Smith	Broadway run May 5, 1910 – July 9, 1910 at the Herald Square Theatre. Later returned for further performances at the Manhattan Opera House in December 1911. Later 1926 musical Peggy-Ann by Richard Rodgers and Lorenz Hart was based on this musical.	
The Prince of Bohemia	musical in two acts	1910	Broadway: Hackett Theatre, January 14, 1910	Sloane	lyrics by E. Ray Goetz; book by J. Hartley Manners	Broadway run ended after 28 performances in February 1910	
The Summer Widowers	"musical panorama in seven views"	1910	Broadway: Broadway Theatre, June 4, 1910	Sloane	libretto by Glen MacDonough	Broadway run ended after 140 performances on October 1, 1910	
The Hen-Pecks	musical in two acts	1911	Broadway: Broadway Theatre, February 4, 1911	Sloane	lyrics by E. Ray Goetz and Vincent Bryan; book by Glen MacDonough	Broadway run ended after 187 performances on September 23, 1911	
The Never Homes	"musical comedy in six scenes"; two acts	1911	Broadway: Broadway Theatre, October 5, 1911	Sloane	lyrics by E. Ray Goetz; book by Glen MacDonough	Broadway run ended after 92 performances on December 23, 1911	
Hanky Panky	musical in two acts and 3 scenes	1911	Chicago: Lew Fields American Music Hall, October 31, 1911	Sloane	lyrics by E. Ray Goetz; book by Edgar Smith	Toured in 1911-1912 prior to coming to Broadway. Played at the Broadway Theatre in New York from August 5, 1912 – November 2, 1912.	
Hokey-Pokey (staged with Bunty, Bulls and Strings)	referred to as a grouped work as "a pot-pourri of reminiscences in two acts"	1912	Broadway: Broadway Theatre, February 8, 1912	Sloane, John Stromberg, and William T. Francis	lyrics by Edgar Smith and E. Ray Goetz; book by Edgar Smith	Closed on May 11, 1912 after 108 performances	
Bunty, Bulls and Strings (staged with Hokey-Pokey)	referred to as a grouped work as "a pot-pourri of reminiscences in two acts"	1912	Broadway: Broadway Theatre, February 8, 1912	Sloane	lyrics by E. Ray Goetz; book by Edgar Smith	Closed on May 11, 1912 after 108 performances. Contained the song "Alexander's Bag-Pipe Band" which Sloane and Goetz wrote with Irving Berlin.	
Roly Poly (staged with Without the Law)	a "musical play in two acts"	1912	Broadway: Weber and Fields' Broadway Music Hall, November 21, 1912	Sloane and E. Ray Goetz	lyrics by Sloane and Goetz; book by Edgar Smith	Ran on Broadway until January 11, 1913 when it closed after 60 performances.	
Without the Law (staged with Roly Poly)	a "burlesque in three scenes"; one act	1912	Broadway: Weber and Fields' Broadway Music Hall, November 21, 1912	Sloane	lyrics by E. Ray Goetz; book by Edgar Smith	A parody of Bayard Veiller's Within The Law. Ran on Broadway until January 11, 1913 when it closed after 60 performances.	
The Sun Dodgers	musical in two acts	1912	Albany, New York: Harmanus Bleecker Hall, October 18, 1912	Sloane	lyrics by E. Ray Goetz; book by Edgar Smith	Ran on Broadway at the Broadway Theatre from November 30, 1912 – December 14, 1912	
Ladies First	musical in three acts	1918	Broadway: Broadhurst Theatre, October 24, 1918	Sloane	lyrics and book by Harry B. Smith	Story adapted from Charles H. Hoyt's A Contented Woman. Broadway run transferred to the Nora Bayes Theatre where it closed on March 15, 1919 after 164 performances.	
The Greenwich Village Follies	musical revue	1919	New York: Greenwich Village Theatre, July 15, 1919	Sloane	lyrics by John Murray Anderson and Arthur Swanstrom; book by Philip Bartholomae	Transferred to Broadway's Nora Bayes Theatre where it ran from September 9, 1919 - January 31, 1920	
The Greenwich Village Follies of 1920	musical revue	1920	New York: Greenwich Village Theatre, August 30, 1920	Sloane	lyrics by John Murray Anderson and Arthur Swanstrom; book by Thomas J. Gray	Transferred to Broadway's Shubert Theatre where it ran from September 20, 1920 – March 5, 1921	
China Rose	operetta in two acts	1924	Boston: Hollis Street Theatre, December 24, 1924	Sloane	libretto by Harry L. Cort and George E. Stoddard	Opened on Broadway at the Martin Beck Theatre on January 19, 1925. Transferred to Wallack's Theatre on February 23, 1925. Ended its Broadway run at the Knickerbocker Theatre on May 9, 1925 with a collective New York run of 120 performances.	

== Musicals and operettas with interpolated music by Sloane ==
- Excelsior, Jr., musical; music by George Lowell Tracy; libretto by Robert Barnet; opened at Hammerstein's Olympia on November 29, 1895. Multiple songs and instrumental numbers interpolated into the show by Sloane.
- Stranger in New York (1897), musical; music by Richard Stahl; book and lyrics by Charles H. Hoyt. Used the two songs by Sloane: "Won't You Speak to Sister Mary?" and "Walker's Dancing School"
- Papa's Wife (1899)
- A Chinese Honeymoon (1901), musical in two acts; libretto by George Dance; music by Howard Talbot. Sloane's song "Little Street in Heaven They Call Broadway" was interpolated into the 1902 Broadway production.
- The Liberty Belles (1901), musical; music by John W. Bratton; lyrics and book by Harry B. Smith. Sloane contributed the songs "A Little Child Like Me", "My Filipino Pet", "Spring Hat" and "Shopping Chorus".
- The Little Duchess, additional music by Sloane, October 14, 1901 – April 1902
- George W. Lederer's Mid-Summer Night Fancies, additional music Sloane, June 22, 1903 – July 18, 1903
- Red Feather (1903), comic opera in two acts; music by Reginald De Koven, libretto by Charles Klein; lyrics by Charles Emerson Cook. Sloane contributed the song "There's A Little Street in Heaven They Call Broadway"
- The Girl from Dixie (1903), musical in two acts; libretto by Harry B. Smith; music by various composer. Sloane composed the music for the song "The Dissipated Kitten".
- Glittering Gloria (1903), musical in three acts; music by Bernard Rolt; book by Hugh Morton; lyrics by Morton and Rolt. Premiered at Wyndham's Theatre, London in 1903. The 1904 Broadway production at Daly's Theatre featured the song "Susan" with lyrics by Edward S. Abeles and music by Sloane.
- Girls Will Be Girls (1904), musical in three acts; music and lyrics by Joseph Hart; book by R. Melville Baker. Sloane contributed the song "Swinging" to the national touring production in 1906.
- The Rollicking Girl (1905), musical in three acts; music by William T. Francis; lyrics and book by Sydney Rosenfeld. Sloane contributed the song "Bored" with lyrics by Frederick Ranken.
- About Town (1906), musical in two acts; music by Melville Ellis and Raymond Hubbell; book and lyrics by Joseph Herbert. The opening chorus added to the production in Boston in 1907 after its Broadway run ended is attributed to Sloane.
- Fascinating Flora (1907), musical in two acts; music by Gustav Kerker; lyrics by: R. H. Burnside; book by R. H. Burnside and Joseph W. Herbert. Sloane's song "Romance and Reality" with lyrics by Louis Harrison was interpolated into the musical.
- The Beauty Spot (1909), musical in two acts; music by Reginald De Koven; book and lyrics by Joseph W. Herbert. Sloane wrote the music for the "Entrance of the Flower Girls", and his song "Foolish Questions" with lyrics by William Lee was interpolated into the show.
- Hello, Paris (1911), musical revue in one act; music by J. Rosamond Johnson; lyrics by J. Leubrie Hill; book by William Le Baron. Sloane contributed the song "Sentimental Tommy" with lyrics by E. Ray Goetz.
- All Star Gambol (1913), revue starring Marie Dressler with Dressler serving as playwright and lyricist and Frederick Schwartz as her musical director. Dressler used pre-existing songs for this show by a variety of composers. Sloane's song "Great Big Girl Like Me" with lyrics by Edgar Smith was interpolated into the show.
- A Fantastic Fricassee (1922), musical revue in fifteen scenes; Prologue attributed to Sloane.
- Sing Out, Sweet Land (1944), A Salute to American Folk and Popular Music; music arranged by Elie Siegmaster. Used Sloane's "Heaven Will Protect the Working Girl".

== Filmography ==
Soundtrack

- 1952: Somebody Loves Me, Toddling the Todalo lyrics by Sloane
- 1940: Strike Up the Band, Heaven Will Protect the Working Girl, music & lyrics by Sloane (uncredited)
- 1939: Frontier Marshal Heaven Will Protect the Working Girl, music & lyrics by Sloan (uncredited)

Writer

- 1914: Tillie's Punctured Romance, Tillie's Nightmare (uncredited)

Self

- 1914: Our Mutual Girl, Sloane plays himself (episode 10)

== Selected sheet music ==
William Pilling, New York (publisher)

- He Cert'ny Was Good To Me, lyrics by Jean C. Havez, music by Sloane (1898)

M. Witmark & Sons

- Susie, Mah Sue, music & lyrics by Sloane (lyricist) (1900) – from the musical Broadway to Tokio
- Lazy Bill, A Volunteer Of Rest, music by Sloane, lyrics by Glen MacDonough (1897) - from the musical The Marquis of Michigan

Joseph W. Stern & Co., New York

- There's a Little Street in Heaven That They Call Broadway, lyrics by James T. Waldron & Sloane, music by Sloane (1903) OCLC 26005231

Charles K. Harris, Chicago

The Gingerbread Man (musical)
Book & lyrics by Frederic Ranken, music by Sloane (1905)
- The Evil Eye
- The Beautiful Land of Bon Bon
- John Dough
- Moon Song
