= Composers' Publishing Company =

American music publishing company

The Composers' Publishing Company was a Tin Pan Alley music publishing company incorporated in New York in 1904 by directors Alfred Baldwin Sloane, Irvin M. Hellig, and A. Merrill.

== History ==
The company bears a similar name as Authors' and Composers' Publishing Company. Sloane, at his death in 1925, was vice president of Authors' and Composers' Publishing Company and president of Composers' Publishing Company. In 1901, Marcus Witmark prevailed in winning a court injunction against Authors' and Composers' Publishing Company to cease publishing and selling of Sloane's works. Witmark averred that Sloane had a contract with his firm, M. Witmark & Sons.

== Selected publications ==
Composers' Publishing Company, New York

- A Wise Old Owl (in A flat major), lyrics by Frederic Ranken, music by Alfred Baldwin Sloane (1904) OCLC 224069780
- That Day and You, poem by Estelle Merrymon Clark, music by Palmer John Clark (1913) OCLC 497432636
