= Mayo Civic Center =

Multi-purpose convention center and event facility in Rochester, Minnesota

Coordinates: 44.02247°N 92.458599°W

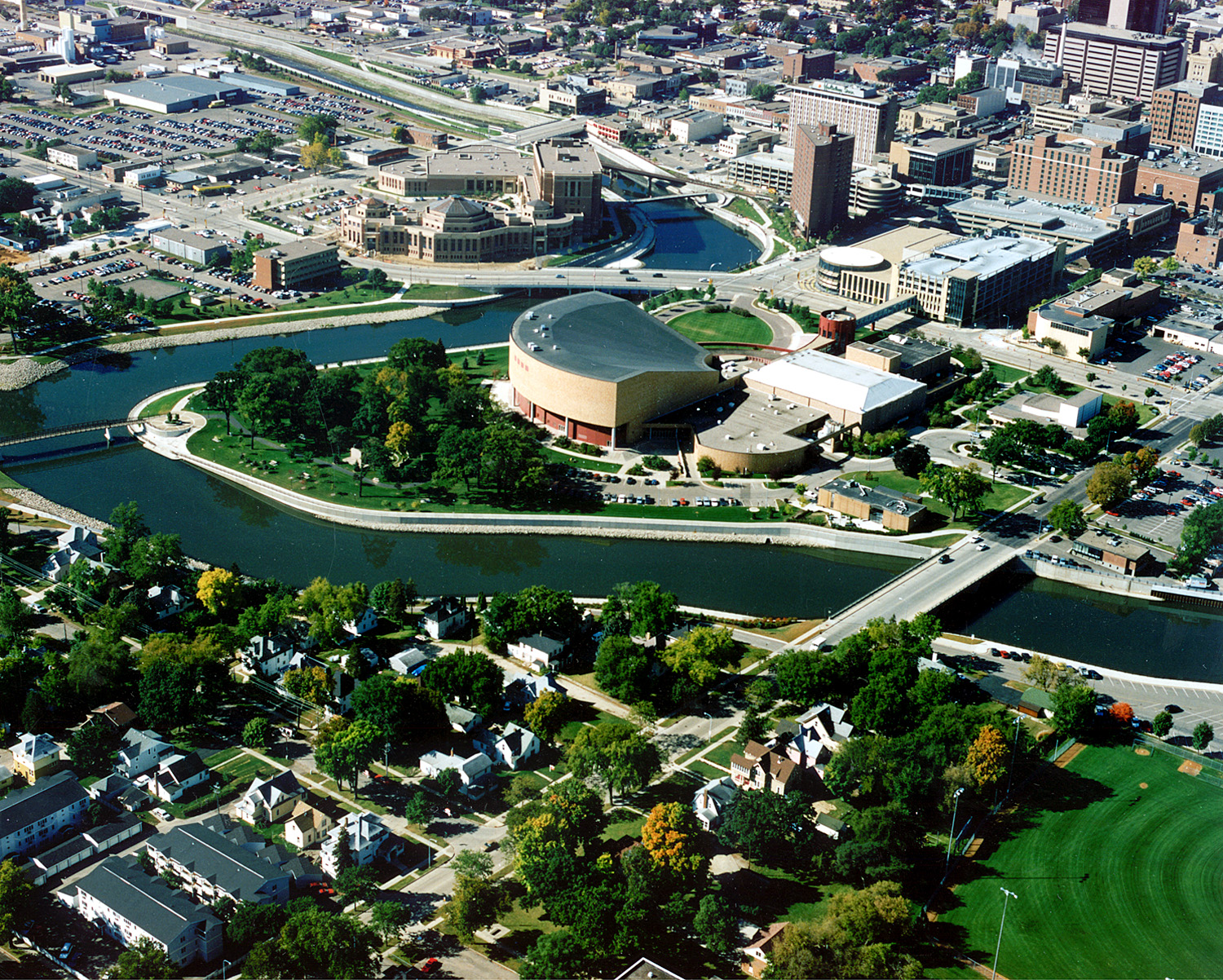
Aerial view of the Mayo Civic Center and downtown Rochester, Minnesota

The Mayo Civic Center is a multi-purpose convention center and event facility in Rochester, Minnesota. It was home to the Rochester Mustangs ice hockey team and various professional basketball franchises. It is also notable for being one of the filming locations for the music video of "Wanted Dead or Alive" by Bon Jovi. Adjacent to the arena is Mayo Park and the Rochester Art Center.

== History ==
The original building was built in 1938, as a gift to the city by Dr. Charles H. Mayo and Mayo Properties Association (now Mayo Clinic) and has been expanded and renovated several times over the years. It consists of a ballroom (40,000 sq. ft.) used for conferences and galas, an arena (5,200 seats) used for concerts, wrestling, and basketball, an auditorium (3,000 seats) used for concerts, performing arts, and sporting events, an exhibit hall for consumer shows and a theatre for the arts (1,084 fixed seat theatre). The Mayo Civic Center also has 23 meeting rooms/suites varying in size.

== Convention center expansion ==
In 2017, the Mayo Civic Center nearly doubled in size by adding a convention center to its existing footprint. The $84 million expansion features a 40,000-square-foot ballroom (can divide into three sections), 16 meeting rooms/suites, and two executive boardrooms. The expanded center hosts medical and technical conferences, large business meetings and healthcare summits.

== Mayo Clinic ==
The Mayo Civic Center acts as the main place for meeting and events of the Mayo Clinic, as it plays host to medical lectures and company gatherings.

== Sports and entertainment hosted ==
=== Professional wrestling events ===
The American Wrestling Association held a weekly television broadcast for both syndication and cable on ESPN, from 1989-1990. Other promotions like World Championship Wrestling and Extreme Championship Wrestling also held shows here prior to their demise. The Civic Center recently has hosted World Wrestling Entertainment house shows with the WWE Raw, Smackdown and ECW appearing. TNA has hosted events here as well.

=== Other events ===
Notable events held the Civic Center are Disney Live, Elmo Live, Blue Man Group and other events. The Harlem Globetrotters and artists, such as Kiss, Chris Young, Little Big Town, Sheryl Crow, Ladysmith Black Mambazo, Bob Dylan, Hinder, Celtic Woman & Disturbed, have performed in the arena. The Mayo Civic Auditorium is used for performing arts as well as concert events. Shows like "The Chocolate Factory" and 1940's Big Band Swing Revue "In the Mood" and other arts events have taken place here, as well as Broadway shows such as Rent. Every two years, the University of Minnesota Marching Band performs its indoor concert at the venue in addition to its traditional series at Northrop Auditorium in Minneapolis.

It annually hosts the NYWA Youth Wrestling State Championships which is one of the biggest wrestling tournaments in the United States. It hosted the NCAA Women's Division II Basketball Championship in 2001 and 2002.
