= China Rose =

Chinese Rose may refer to:

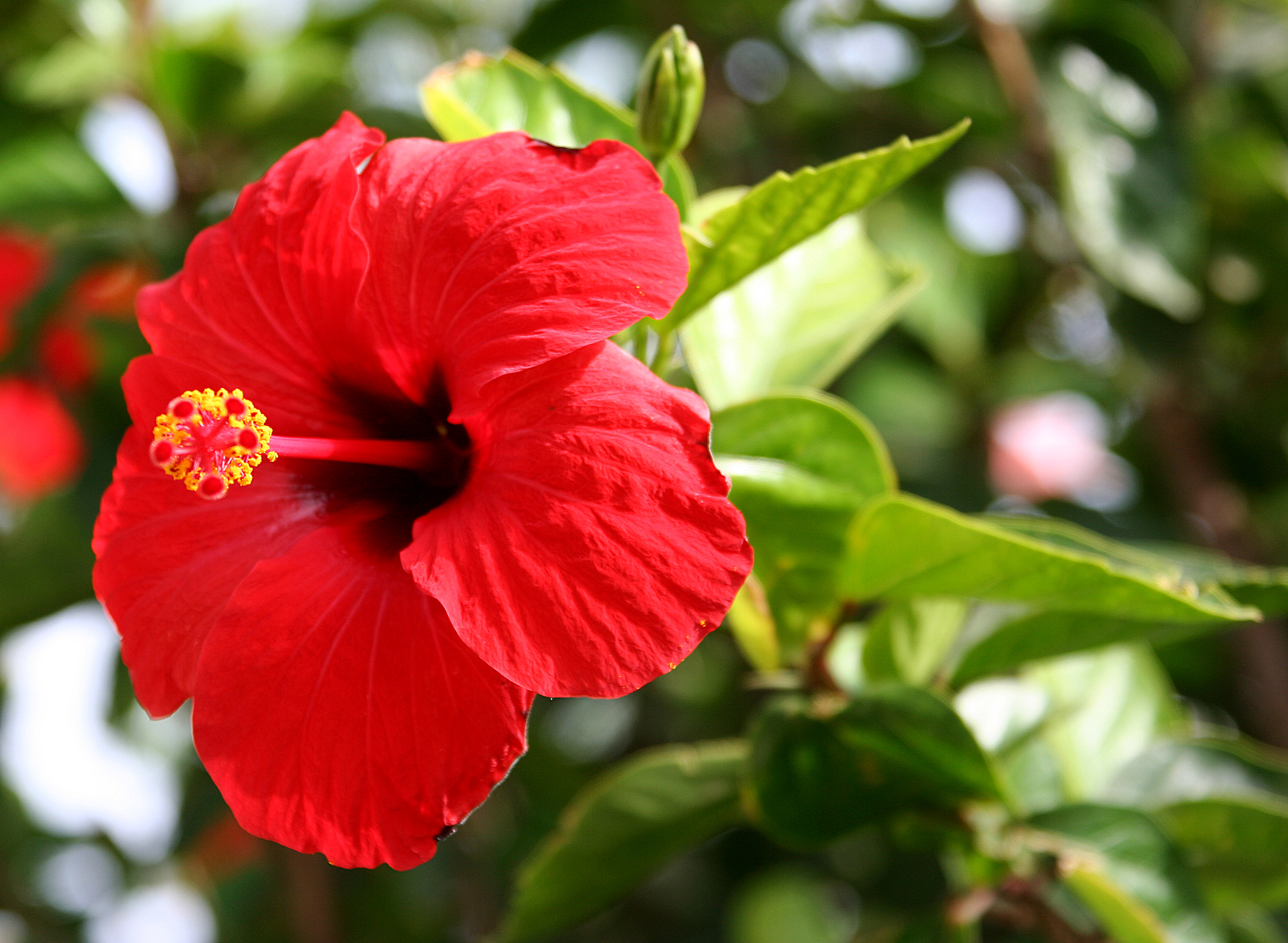
Hibiscus rosa-sinensis

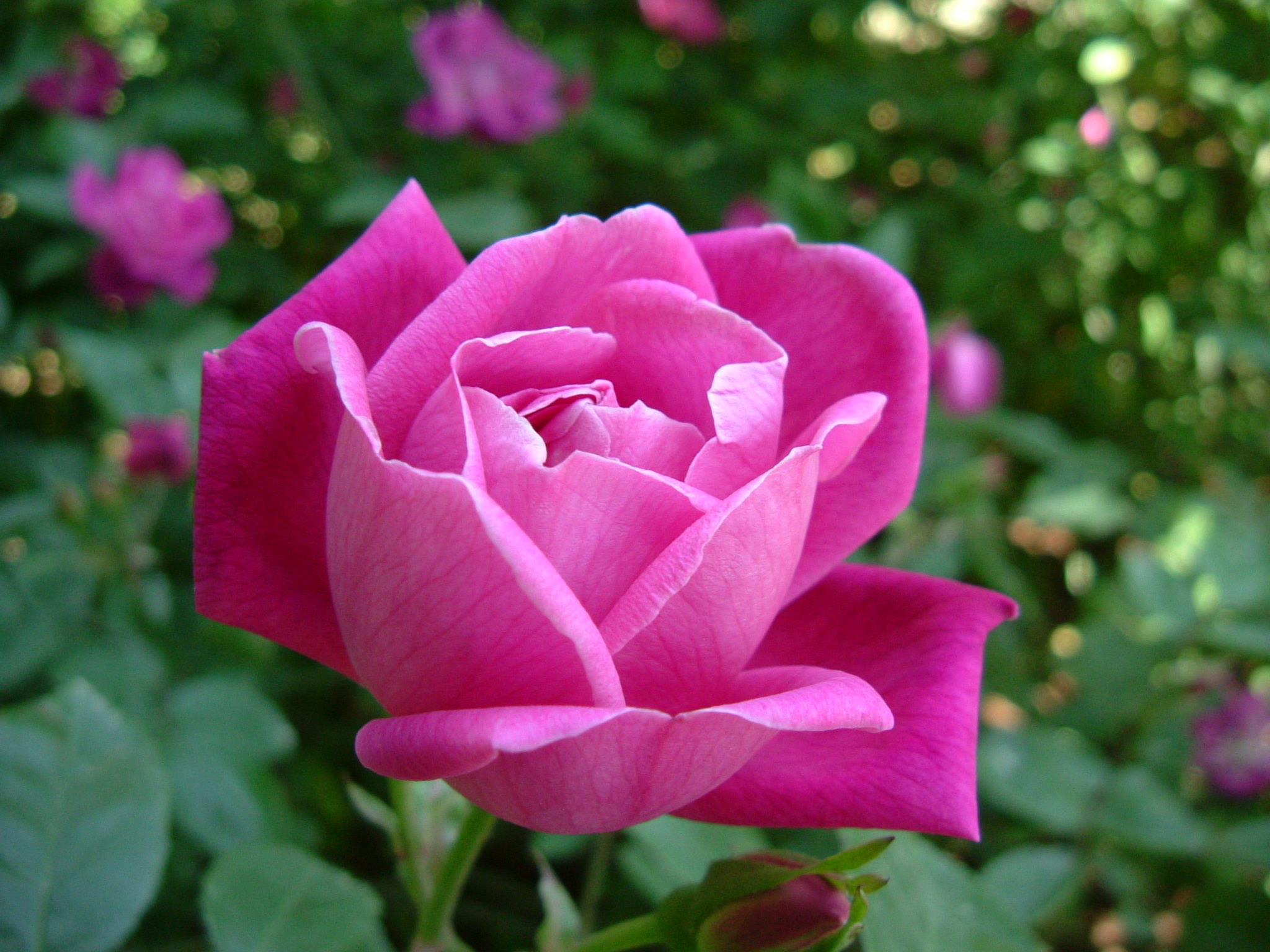
Rosa chinensis

- Hibiscus rosa-sinensis (Chinese: 朱槿), a flowering plant of the genus Hibiscus
- Rosa chinensis (Chinese: 月季), a flowering plant of the genus Rosa
- China Rose (operetta), 1925 operetta by A. Baldwin Sloane, Harry L. Cort, and George E. Stoddard
