= Amy Louise Reed =

American academic

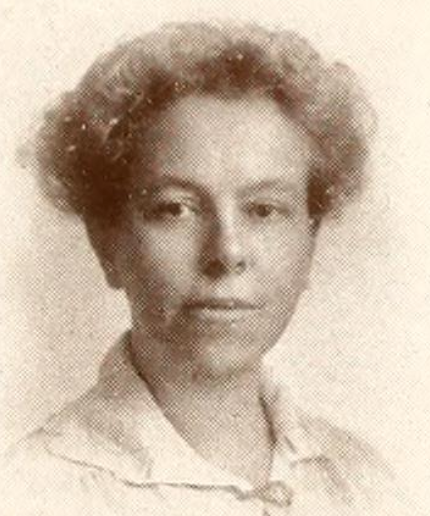
- Amy Louise Reed from the 1917 yearbook of Vassar College
- Born: November 22, 1872; New York, New York, U.S.
- Died: January 24, 1949 (age 76); Poughkeepsie, New York, U.S.
- Occupation(s): College professor, librarian, writer
- Relatives: Cora Tanner (sister-in-law)

Amy Louise Reed (November 22, 1872 – January 24, 1949) was an American academic and writer. She was a professor of English and librarian at Vassar College.

== Early life and education ==
Reed was born in New York City, the daughter of John Herbert Reed. One of her brothers was a noted bicyclist in the 1880s, and married actress Cora Tanner. Another brother, Herbert, was a sports writer. She graduated from Vassar College in 1892. She pursued further literary studies at Yale University. In 1924 she completed a Ph.D. at Columbia University. She was a member of Phi Beta Kappa.

== Career ==
Reed taught at private schools after college. She started teaching at Vassar College in 1904, gained associate professor status in 1920, and became a full professor in 1923. She also served as the librarian of Vassar College from 1910 to 1921, and as head of the English department from 1922 until her retirement in 1943. She worked closely with Lucy Maynard Salmon. She was president of the faculty club and chair of Vassar's Fiftieth Anniversary Celebration.

Reed spoke to campus, alumnae, and community groups. She was a trustee of the Arlington Free Library in Poughkeepsie.

== Publications ==
In addition to her published works, Reed wrote an unpublished history of Vassar alumnae, and a dramatization of the prologue and The Knight's Tale from Chaucer's The Canterbury Tales, for a performance at Vassar's 1932 commencement.

- "The Doré Gallery in New York" (1892, Vassar Miscellany)
- "Vassar College" (1900, song)
- "Female Delicacy in the Sixties" (1915, Century Magazine)
- The background of Gray's Elegy; a study in the taste for melancholy poetry, 1700-1751 (1924, her doctoral dissertation)
- "Self-Portraiture in the Work of Nathaniel Hawthorne" (1926, Studies in Philology)
- Letters from Brook Farm, 1844–1847 (1928, editor)
- "Homage to Constance Rourke" (1941, Vassar Quarterly)

== Personal life ==
Reed retired to Billings, New York, where she lived with fellow Vassar alumnae Lillian Parrish and Marion Bacon. She died in 1949, at the age of 76, in Poughkeepsie, New York.
