= A Million Dollars =

Musical with music by A. Baldwin Sloane

A Million Dollars is a musical in three acts with music by A. Baldwin Sloane, lyrics by George V. Hobart, and a book co-authored by Hobart and Louis Harrison. The musical's plot is about a barber who comes into sudden wealth and rapidly spends his new fortune. The work premiered on Broadway at the New York Theatre on September 27, 1900. It ran there for 28 performances; closing on October 20, 1900.

A Million Dollars was directed by Frank Smithson and produced by Meyer L. Sire and Henry B. Sire. The cast included Joe Ott as Prince Punxatawney, Ignacio Martinetti as Consomme de Noodle, Cora Tanner as Aurora Borealis, Josie Sadler as Tryphena Shoolz, Nat M. Wills as Cecil Roads, Joseph Sparks as Wishbone McManus, Ethel Everton as Grace Bullion, and Grafton Baker as Harold Spotwood.
