= Marion Bacon =

American bookseller

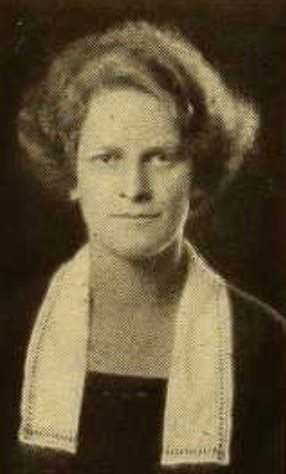
- Marion Bacon, from the 1922 yearbook of Vassar College
- Born: January 21, 1901; Loudonville, New York, U.S.
- Died: June 23, 1975 (aged 74); Sharon, Connecticut, U.S.
- Occupation(s): Bookseller, editor
- Known for: President, American Booksellers Association (1952–1954)

Marion Bacon (January 21, 1901 – June 23, 1975) was an American bookseller, publisher, and editor. She was on the staff at Vassar College, as founder and manager of the school's cooperative bookshop, and as director of campus publications. From 1952 to 1954, she was president of the American Booksellers Association.

== Early life and education ==
Bacon was born in Loudonville, New York, the daughter of Allen H. Bacon and Jennie A. Mather Bacon. Her father was a businessman, and her mother's family was prominent in Albany. She attended the Albany Academy for Girls, and graduated from Vassar College in 1922.

== Career ==
Bacon worked at a bank and taught school after college. She was founder and longtime manager of the cooperative bookshop at Vassar College beginning in 1923. From 1933 to 1936, she was director of publications at Vassar College. She was editor of the alumni magazine in the 1940s. She was the elected president of the American Booksellers Association from 1952 to 1954. She succeeded Allan McMahan, and was succeeded in that national presidency by Ellsworth R. Young. She retired in 1966.

== Publications ==
- Life at Vassar: 75 Years in Pictures (1940, editor)
- Mind Your Own Business: A Book for Records (1943, compiler)

== Personal life ==
Bacon traveled to France and England with her cousin Julia Bacon in 1930. She lived with fellow Vassar alumnae Amy Louise Reed and Lillian Parrish in Billings, New York in the 1940s. She traveled to Wyoming with Katherine Keyes in summer 1949. She was an enthusiastic gardener and canner, and entered some of her vegetables in the Dutchess County Horticultural Society show. She died in 1975, in Sharon, Connecticut, at the age of 74.
