= The Gingerbread Man (Sloane and Rankin musical) =

1905 musical

The Gingerbread Man is a musical in two acts with music by A. Baldwin Sloane and both book and lyrics by Frederic Ranken. Described by the creators as a "Fanciful Fairyesque", the work was essentially a Christmas musical with Santa Claus and Mrs. Claus serving as the heroes of the piece.

== Plot ==
The King of Bon Bon Land, a.k.a. The Gingerbread Man, has been turned into gingerbread by the evil sorcerer Machevelius Fudge and lives in fear of being eaten. Santa Claus and his reindeer arrive to come to his aid. Further misadventures ensue when he is faced by a fiery dragon. All comes to a happy ending when Mrs. Claus arrives to save the day.

== Performance history ==
The Gingerbread Man premiered on November 15, 1905 at the Auditorium Theatre in Malden, Massachusetts. It then toured to the Hyperion Theatre in New Haven, Connecticut, the Wieting Opera House in Syracuse, New York, and the Chestnut Street Opera House in Philadelphia.

The tour reached Broadway where it opened at the Liberty Theatre on Christmas Day 1905. It ran at that theatre for a total of sixteen performances; closing on January 6, 1906. That same production returned to Broadway for sixteen further performances at the New York Theatre from May 14, 1906 - May 26, 1906. It also toured nationally for performances during the holiday season in 1906–1907. The production was directed by Louis F. Gottschalk and Charles Sinclair, and produced by Harry E. Converse and Mason Peters. The sets were designed by Ernest Albert, and the costumes by Archie Gunn, Will R. Barnes and J. Hegeman. The production starred Eddie Redway in the title role.

The Gingerbread Man was revived in December 1912 - January 1913 at the Castle Square Theatre in Boston with Donald Meek in the title role and Florence Shirley as Margery Daw.

== Bibliography ==
- Bordman, Gerald Martin; Norton, Richard (2010). American Musical Theatre: A Chronicle. Oxford University Press. ISBN 9780199729708.
- Dietz, Dan (2022). "The Gingerbread Man". The Complete Book of 1900s Broadway Musicals. Rowman & Littlefield Publishers. ISBN 9781538168943.
- Bloom, Ken (1996). "The Gingerbread Man". American Song: A-S. Schirmer Books. ISBN 9780028645735.
