= Robert Barnet =

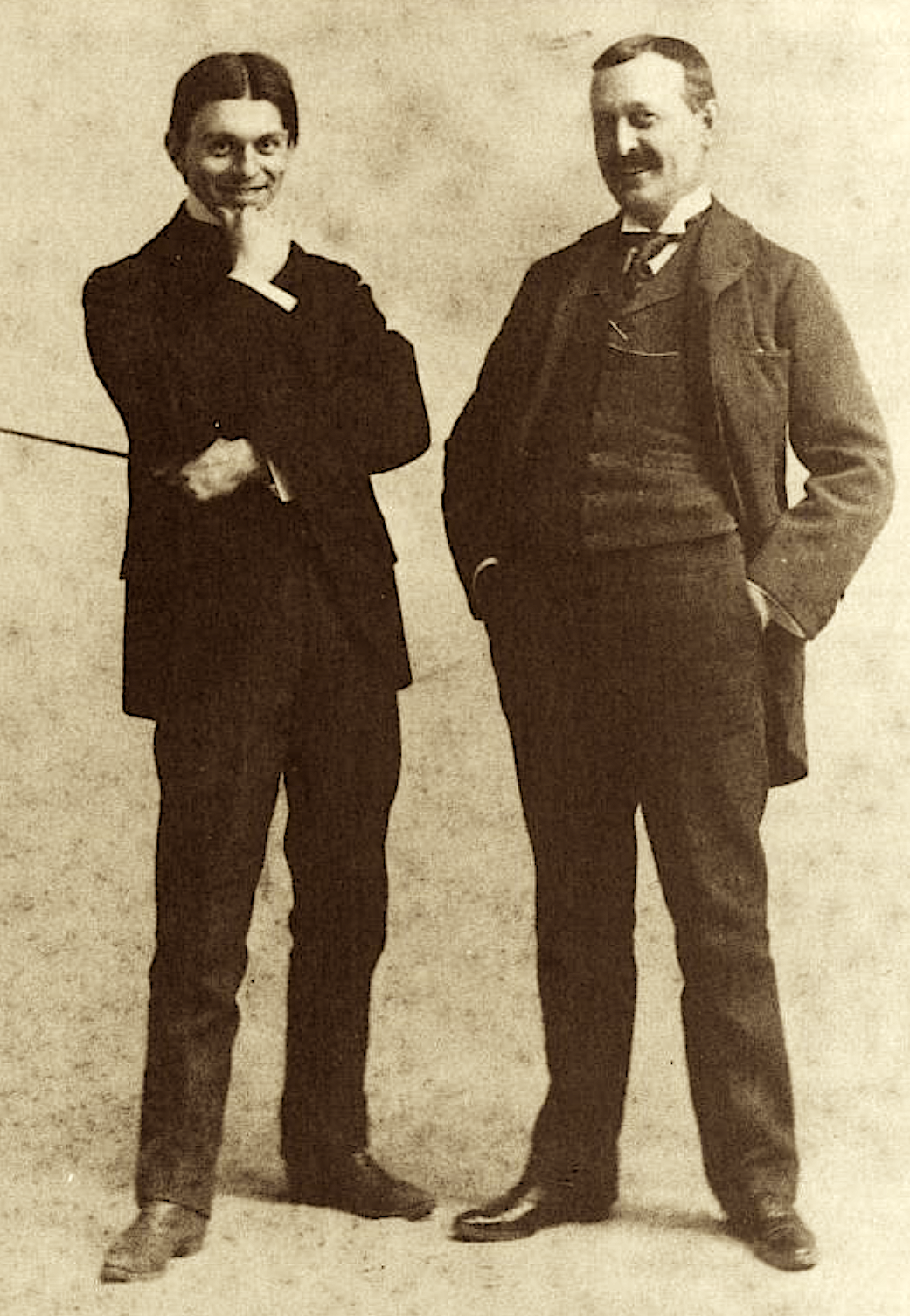
Composer A. Baldwin Sloane (left) with Robert Barnet (right) in 1896.

Robert Ayres Barnet (September 3, 1853 – June 26, 1933) was an American musical theatre lyricist from New York City, active in New York and Boston in the late 19th and early 20th centuries. He is most remembered for his collaborations with the Boston Men's Army Cadets.

== Career ==
Barnet wrote lyrics for 1492 and Excelsior, Jr. Collaborators included Robert Melville Baker, George Whitefield Chadwick, Edward Warren Corliss, Louis F. Gottschalk, Harry Lawson Heartz, David Kilburn Stevens, Lewis Sabin Thompson, and George Lowell Tracy. He belonged to the Boston Cadets, and contributed to the group's amateur theatricals. For example, his Jack and the Beanstock premiered in 1896 at Boston's Tremont Theatre. It was performed by the "Boston Cadets, who always present Barnet's pieces before they are staged professionally. The new piece is ... a fairy Mother Goose burlesque. The music is by A.B. Sloane. ... Augustus Pitou, Klaw & Erlanger, E.E. Rice, and other prominent gentlemen" attended. The female impersonator Julian Eltinge appeared in the early shows. Barnet died in New York in 1933.

== Images ==
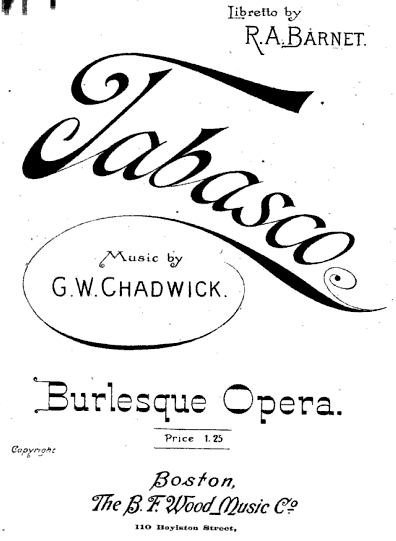
Burlesque Opera of Tabasco, 1894

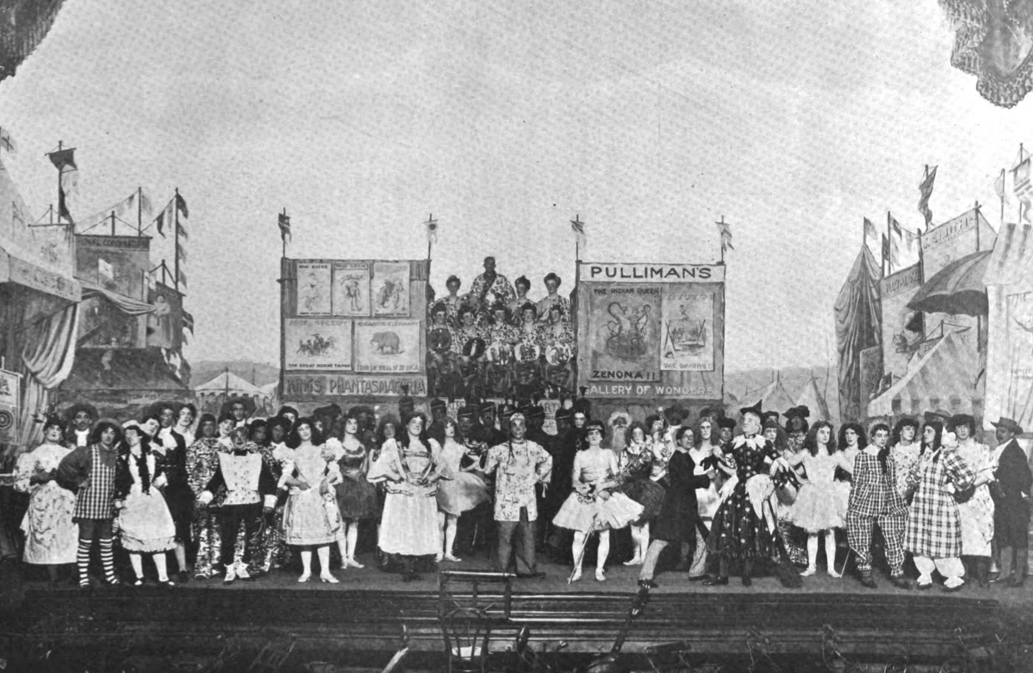
Boston Cadets' production of Barnet's Simple Simon, 1897

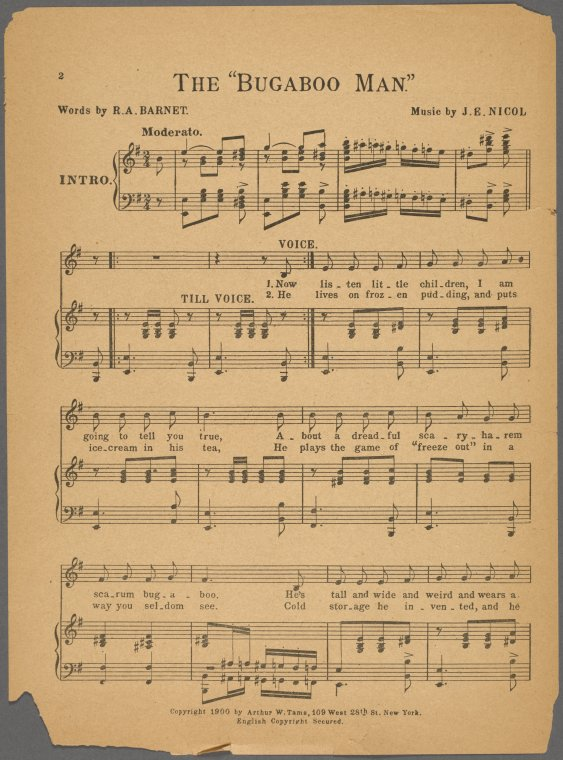
"Bugaboo Man," New York World, 1900

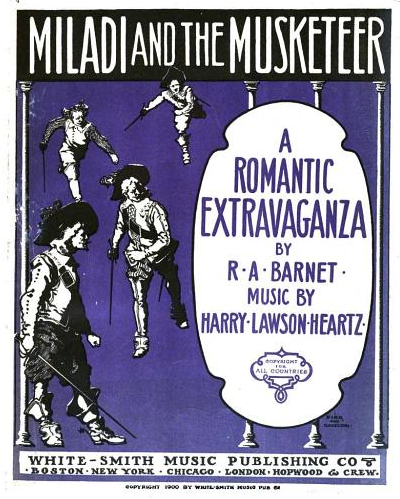
Miladi and the Musketeer, 1901

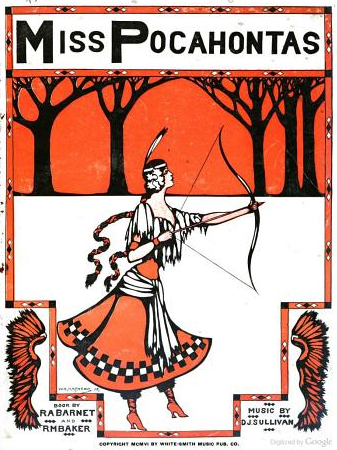
Miss Pocahontas: an Indian War-Whoop in Two Whoops, 1906
