= La Belle Titcomb =

American vaudeville performer

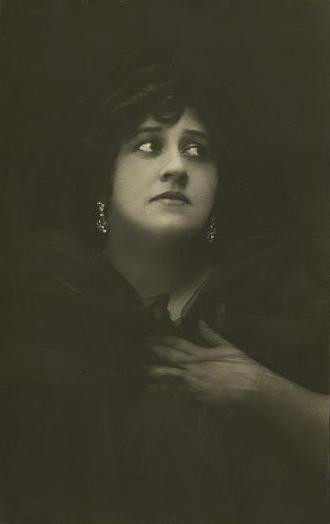
- NYPL Digital Collection
- Born: January 19, 1876; Washington, District of Columbia, United States
- Occupation: Vaudeville entertainer
- Writing career
- Years active: 1867–1903

Heloise McCeney (January 19, 1876 – after 1920), stage name La Belle Titcomb, was an American vaudeville performer known as The Parisian Dancer on Horseback. Her act usually had her riding upon a white horse while singing operatic arias.

== Biography ==
Heloise McCeney was born on January 19, 1876, in Washington, D.C., the daughter of Robert and Anna (née Broom) McCeney. Robert McCeney, a native of Washington D.C., served as secretary for the National Fair Association in Washington. He died in San Leandro, California, on December 9, 1898, after a short bout with pneumonia.

McCeney had a diamond tooth and her act was described by the El Paso Herald in 1909 as "an equestrian act of such a thrilling nature that a reporter couldn't put it all on paper."

=== Marriages ===
Heloise McCeney's first marriage was to a San Francisco dentist, Charles B. Titcomb. Her second marriage, to Waine Weinerbet (his last name was given as "McEinbett" in a contemporary New York Times article) ended in divorce on May 13, 1910, in Chicago on the grounds of "extreme cruelty."

Her third marriage was to fellow vaudeville performer Nat M. Wills on May 23, 1910. It was a civil ceremony, where New York Alderman, Hannon, performed the service. The couple honeymooned in Europe after the wedding. Upon their divorce four years later, she received a substantial alimony settlement which led to a legal battle to have the amount reduced after Wills married actress May Day (actress).

Titcomb kept her married name after their divorce and listed herself as a widow after Wills died in 1917. La Belle Titcomb continued to perform all over the world, though scant record of her exists after 1920.

== Gallery ==
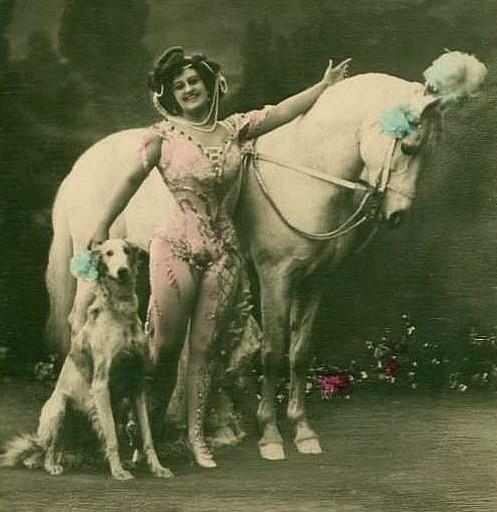
La Belle Titcomb
(ca. 1900)

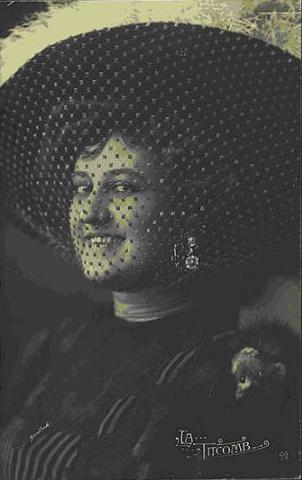
La Belle Titcomb
(ca. 1900)
NYPL Digital Collection

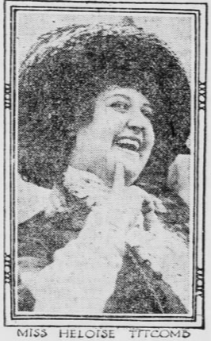
La Belle Titcomb in 1909
