= Nat M. Wills =

American vaudeville entertainer

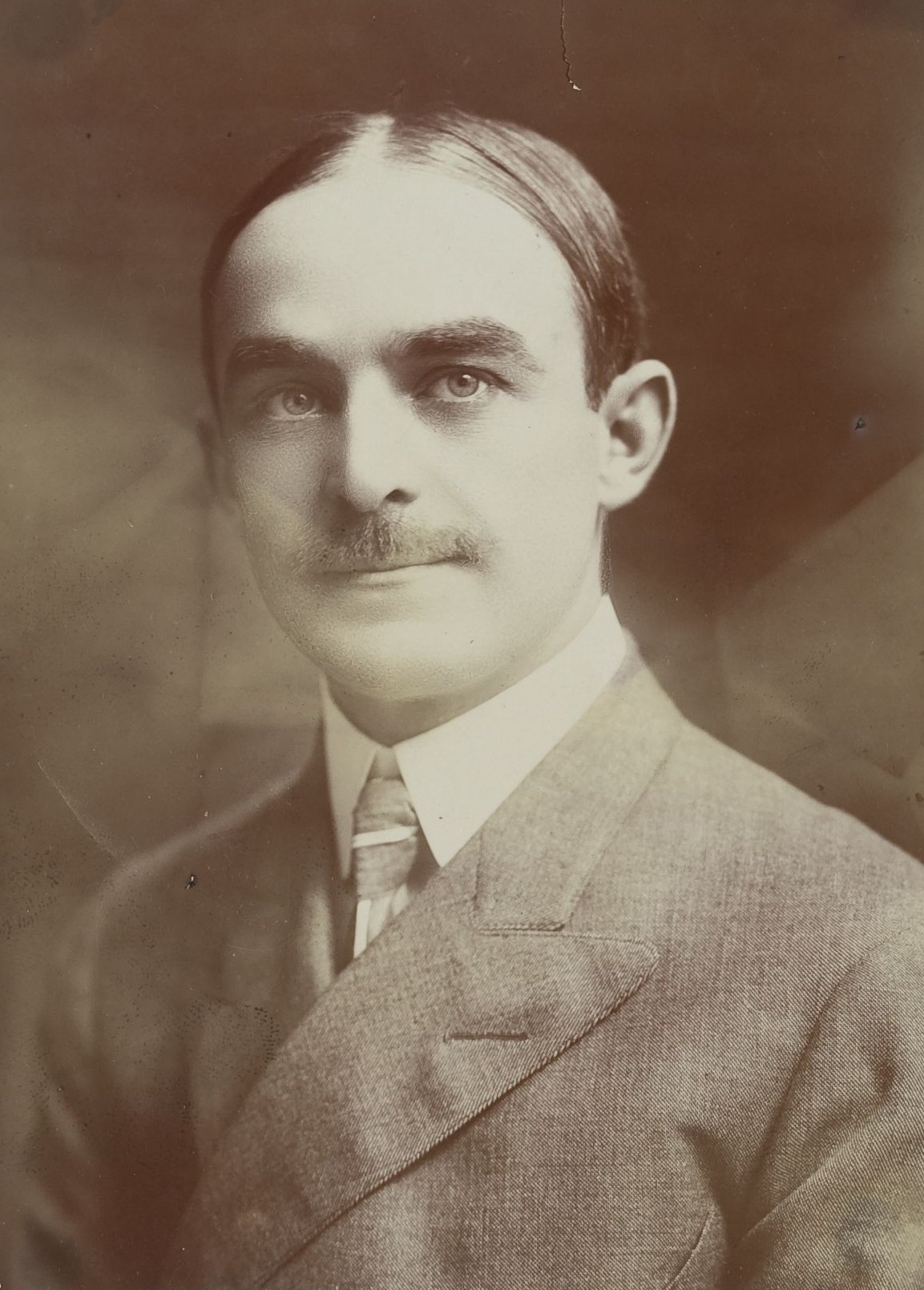

Background information
- Born: Louis McGrath Wills; July 11, 1873; Fredericksburg, Virginia
- Died: December 9, 1917 (aged 44) Woodcliff Lake, New Jersey
- Genre: Vaudeville

Nat M. Wills (born Louis McGrath Wills; July 11, 1873 – December 9, 1917) was a popular American stage star, vaudeville entertainer, and recording artist at the beginning of the 20th century. He is best known for his "tramp" persona and for performing humorous or satirical musical numbers, including parodies of popular songs of the day.

== Early life ==
Nat Wills was born Louis McGrath Wills in Fredericksburg, Virginia, on July 11, 1873, the son of John (1832–1904) and Sallie B. (1845–1881) Wills. His birth name is variously given as Louis Magrath Wills, Matthew McGrath Wills and Edward McGregor, but census records from 1880 show a boy named "Lewis" Wills, and Wills gave his legal name as Louis on official documents. He had a brother, Clarence (1877–1896), and a sister, Maud, born in 1875. He also had a half-sister, Indianna, born in 1855, and a half-brother, George F., born in 1853, from his father's first marriage to Susan A. Wills (1832–1865).

Little is known about his early life. There is no record of his birth in Virginia. An article in the Fredericksburg, Virginia Daily Star, dated Tuesday, October 9, 1923, mentions Maud, and says that Wills was the grandson of James Taylor, a policeman. James Taylor was Wills' mother Sallie's father and is listed on census records as a policeman.

== Performing career ==
Wills' family moved to Washington, D.C. when he was a child and he and began his theatrical career there. Reportedly, one of his first stage appearances was with Minnie Palmer, a popular actress and operetta star of the day.

As a young man, Wills appeared in melodramas and stage shows all over the United States. He alternated between theatrical stage shows and vaudeville performances throughout his life. In 1903, Wills joined The Lambs Club. He was one of the first entertainers to perform at the Palace Theater, and he appeared in the 1913 edition of the Ziegfeld Follies.

Wills was famous for his version of "No News," an old and much copied vaudeville routine. In a monologue fashion, Wills played both a wealthy man returned from a doctor-ordered vacation and a servant reporting the news on the man's return home. The routine begins with the servant assuring the master there is no news to report, "except for one small thing..." which culminates in a great deal of tragic news.

Wills tried to help other entertainers by forming, with other performers, The White Rats, the first entertainer's union. He was an original member of the board of governors. The White Rats (rats is "star" spelled backwards) were organized June 1, 1900, to combat the abuses of the United Booking Office, a group of managers who had a monopoly on vaudeville bookings.

=== Notable stage appearances ===
"Broadway appearances"

- September 27, 1900, through October 20, 1900 – A Million Dollars, role: Cecil Roads
- August 17, 1903, through February 27, 1904 – A Son of Rest, role: Hunting Grubb
- September 11, 1905, through January 6, 1906 – The Duke of Duluth, role: Darling Doolittle
- June 16, 1913, through September 6, 1913 – Ziegfeld Follies of 1913
- August 23, 1917, through May 11, 1918 – Cheer Up – Wills was appearing in this production when he died in December 1917.

=== Film appearances ===
- Nat Wills as King of Kazam (1911)
- Webb Singing Pictures (1917)

=== Partial discography ===
==== 1908 ====
- "No News, or What Killed the Dog?" – Comic monologue that was one of the best-selling records of its time.
- "The Flag He Loved So Well" – Parody of war songs describing a young man who heroically plays the trombone during war.
- "Are You Sincere?" – Parody that describes a timid police officer encountering bank robbers. This track includes a spoken introduction in which Wills tells topical jokes.
- "B.P.O.E : Elks' Song" – Comic song in which Wills describes his time in the Benevolent Protective Order of Elks, or B.P.O.E., which he calls "The Best People on Earth." Many Elks lodges feature this song on their websites.
- "The Old Oaken Bucket" – Parody of a song based on a poetic ode to an oak bucket written by Samuel Woodworth in 1817 and set to music in 1826, in which the Happy Tramp encounters a bull. This track includes a spoken introduction in which Wills tells topical jokes.
- "Our Boarding House" – Parody of "Battle Hymn of the Republic" detailing the comically deplorable conditions in a boarding house.
- "Hoboken" – No recording of this song is known to exist today.

==== 1909 ====
- "At the Comic Opera" – Medley that uses music from many operas to describe one humorous night at the opera, including a mention of Enrico Caruso.
- "Rainbow and Sunbonnet Sue" – No recording of this song is known to exist today.
- "The Traveling Man" – Comic song describing the singer's time traveling the United States in a repertory theater company.
- "Song of the English Chappie" – Parody of English music hall songs.
- "Liberty" – No recording of this song is known to exist today.
- "Hortense at the Skating Rink" – Comic monologue in which the speaker takes his overweight girlfriend to a roller skating rink.
- "A Talk on Father" – No recording of this song is known to exist today.
- "Jungle Town Parody: Teddy in Africa" – Parody of the African safari taken by former president Teddy Roosevelt after he left office in 1909.
- "Saving up Coupons for Mother" – Parody of popular sentimental ballads, particularly "Just Tell Them That You Saw Me" by Paul Dresser, describing a young man who smokes himself to death trying to save enough green cigarette coupons to purchase a tombstone for his deceased father.
- "Reformed Love (and a Few Other Subjects)" – Comic monologue describing how new research on germs and bacteria, and their role in sickness, will affect love.
- "Hortense at Sea" – Comic monologue in which the speaker takes his underweight girlfriend on a sea voyage to regain her health.

==== 1913 ====
"New York, What's the Matter with Yo
Recording from 1913

"If a Table at Rector's Could Talk"
Recording from 1913

- "Too Much Dog" – Comic monologue detailing the speaker's misadventures with his wife's five dogs.
- "A New Cure for Drinking" – Comic monologue describing a group of men who are trying to give up drinking alcohol.
- "Darky Stories" – Comic monologue telling two stories about African-Americans. This track is considered offensive today, but the humor was not unusual for the time. The original title of the track was "Darky Stories," but later versions appear under the name "Two Negro Stories."
- "Parody on Trail of the Lonesome Pine" – No recording of this song is known to exist today.
- "New York, What's the Matter With You?" – Comic song from Wills' appearance in the Ziegfeld Follies of 1913, which describes the aftermath of New York City closing all-night restaurants. The alternate title of the song is "Goodbye, My Tango" and the song describes many dance moves popular in this era, including the tango, turkey trot, and grizzly bear.
- "That Ragtime Suffragette" – Song from the Ziegfeld Follies of 1913. No recording of this song is known to exist today.
- "If a Table at Rector's Could Talk" – Comic song from Wills' appearance in the Ziegfeld Follies of 1913 describing the nightlife at Rector's, a restaurant popular with the Broadway crowd. This song is referenced in the book Appetite City: a Culinary History of New York by William Grimes.
- "Parody on Eight Familiar Songs" – Comic song parodying eight popular songs.

==== 1915 ====
- "A Father of 36" – Comic monologue describing a father's visit to his son's college.
- "Automobile Parody" – Comic medley describing the joys of owning an automobile.

== Personal life ==
Wills was married four times. His first two wives died.

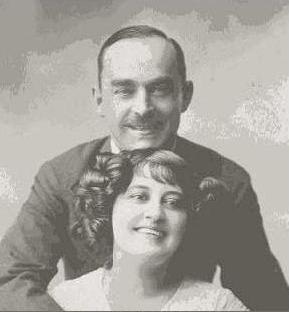
Nate M. Wills with third wife, La Belle Titcomb (ca. 1910s) NYPL Digital Collection

His third wife was Heloise Titcomb, a fellow vaudeville performer who sang French songs and performed an act with white horses using the stage name "La Belle Titcomb." After their divorce, Wills was quoted as saying, "I should have married the horse."

His fourth wife was the actress May Day. Wills and May had a daughter, Natalie, born in about 1915.

On August 20, 1909, tabloids reported that vaudeville player Trixie Friganza was engaged to Wills, but no further mention was made of this and they did not get married.

== Death ==
Wills died on December 9, 1917, of carbon monoxide poisoning while working on his car in a closed garage at his home in Woodcliff, New Jersey. He is buried in Woodlawn Cemetery in The Bronx, New York City.

== Controversy ==
Many vaudeville performers, including Wills, performed in blackface or used ethnic stereotypes in their humor. One such routine was called "Darky Stories." Wills also used "black dialect" in his famous "No News" routine.

Wills went to court on April 13, 1915, after his divorce from La Belle Titcomb and remarriage to May Day, to try to reduce his alimony payments to Heloise. He claimed they were a hardship, as they took too much of his salary, and he had May and their daughter Natalie to support. In addition, he claimed that Heloise made sufficient income with her own stage show, and had assets enough to keep her well without his alimony payments.

== Influence on popular culture ==
Wills in mentioned in James Thurber's autobiography, My Life and Hard Times. Thurber describes how he and his brothers would listen to Wills' recording of "No News" over and over, to the irritation of their father.

Wills is mentioned in Jack Kerouac's The Dharma Bums in a passage describing a cartoon of a young boy going out into the wilderness "with a small staff and pack, like an American Nat Wills tramp of 1905."

Theodore Dreiser, in his book, "The Color of a Great City," mentions Wills as playing a humorous tramp in the chapter entitled "Bums."

== Current interest ==
In 2007, Archeophone Records released a CD containing all existing songs by Wills remastered from their original cylinder or disk formats. The CD includes a 24-page booklet with information about each track, as well as biographical information about Wills, written by Trav S.D., author of No Applause, Just Throw Money: The Book That Made Vaudeville Famous.

Wills' recording of "No News" was identified as one of 25 "cultural, artistic and historical treasures to be preserved for future generations" by the Library of Congress in 2008 under the terms of the National Recording Preservation Act of 2000.

Wills' songs and comic monologues are often played on East Village Radio's "The Ragged Phonograph Program," and his recordings are occasionally played on Venerable Radio and WFMU's Antique Phonograph Music Program.

In May 2011, Wills' recording of "No News" was chosen by the lead curator of the Library of Congress' free streaming National Jukebox, Gene DeAnna, as one of his favorite recordings in the Library's collection on a playlist for The Atlantic magazine online.
