= Happyland (opera) =

1905 comic opera in two acts

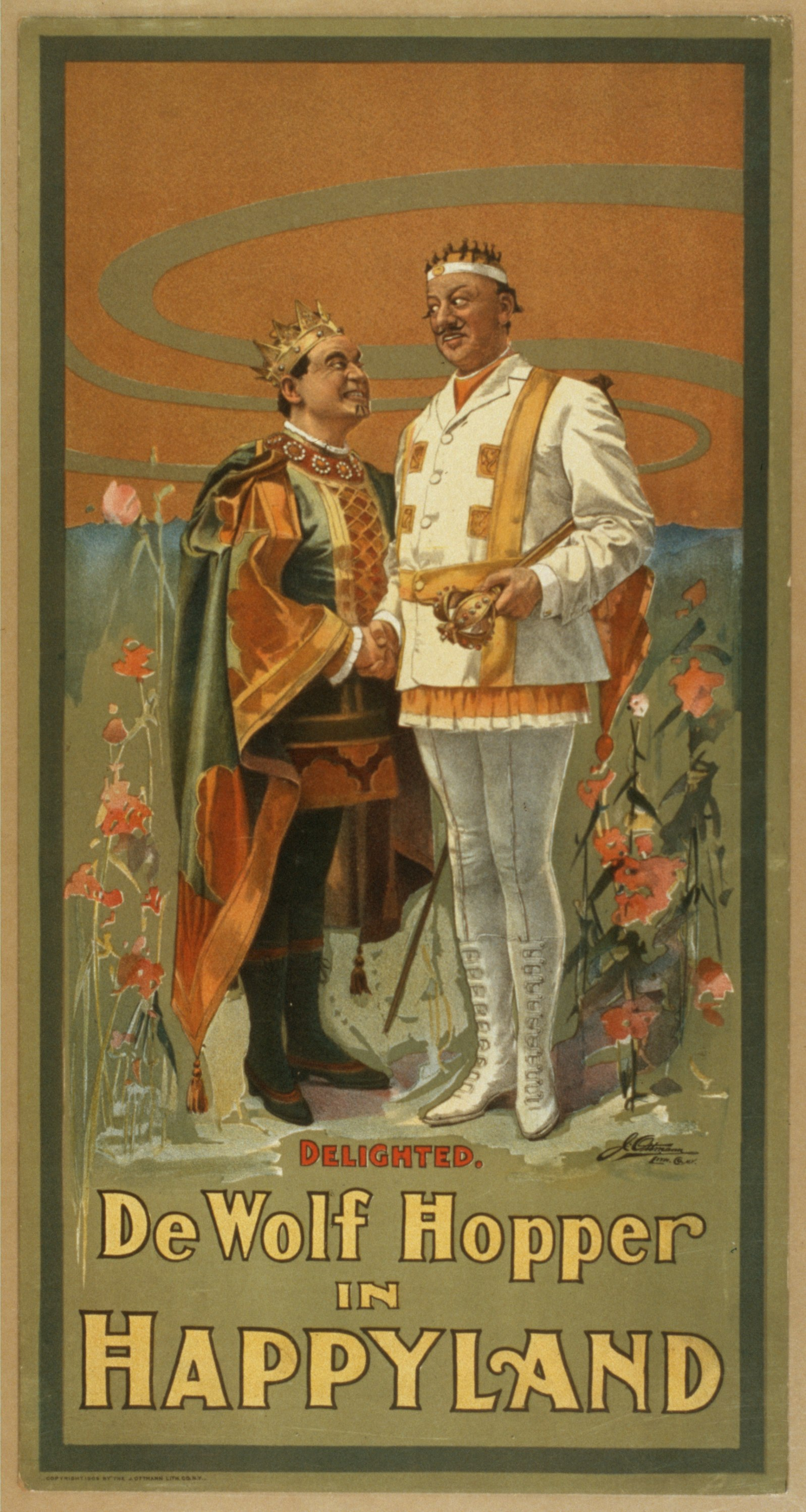
1905 poster for Happyland

Happyland, Or, The King of Elysia is a comic opera in two acts with music by Reginald De Koven and a libretto by Frederic Ranken.

== Plot ==
Happyland was a starring vehicle for DeWolf Hopper who portrayed Ecstaticus, the King of the fictional country of Elysia. The sets depicting Elysia by Ernest Albert, were largely modeled after the classical style of Lawrence Alma-Tadema whose work was heavily influence by ancient Greco-Roman art. In Act I of the opera, Ecstaticus sings the song "A Sickening Sadness Sits On Me" in which he laments his incredible boredom due to the unendingly happiness and prosperity of everyone in his country. He longs for some scandal and conflict to interrupt his monotony.

In order to end his boredom, the king decides to create some drama by declaring that everyone in his kingdom who is unmarried and of age must marry immediately. To further complicate matters, he betrothes his "son" to the daughter of the neighboring monarch, King Altimus of Altruria. Ecstaticus in fact has no son; only a daughter, the Princess Sylvia. For fun, Ecstaticus decides to pass Sylvia off as his son; a plan she despises as she is in love with Prince Fortunatus of Fortunia. Sylvia runs off and elopes with Fortunatus, and further unhappiness arises around Ecstaticus and his kingdom as the consequences of his actions bear fruit.

== Performance History ==
Happyland premiered on Broadway at the Lyric Theatre on October 2, 1905, where it ran for a total of 82 performances; closing on December 9, 1905. The production then re-opened at the Belasco Theatre for further performances in February 1906, and then transferred to the Casino Theatre on March 12, 1906, where it played 36 performances before moving once again to the Majestic Theatre where it opened on May 7, 1906. Happyland ended its Broadway tenure at the Majestic on June 2, 1906, after giving another 32 performances at that theatre. Performance counts in reference works list 146 performances total on Broadway between the Lyric, Casino, and Majestic theatre, but did not include the performances at the Belasco Theatre in February 1906 in that count.

The original cast included DeWolf Hopper as Ecstaticus, Marguerite Clark as Sylvia, William Danforth as Altimus, Joseph Phillips as Fortunatus, Estelle Wentworth as The Lady Patricia, John Dunsmure as Appollus, William Wolff as Sphinxus, Frank Casey as Pedro, Ada Deaves as Paprika, Carl Hayden as Adonis, and Bertha Shalek as The Lady Alicia.

== Bibliography ==
- Bordman, Gerald Martin; Norton, Richard (2010). American Musical Theatre: A Chronicle. Oxford University Press. ISBN 9780199729708.
- Dietz, Dan (2022). "Happyland". The Complete Book of 1900s Broadway Musicals. Rowman & Littlefield Publishers. ISBN 9781538168943.
- Letellier, Robert Ignatius (2015). Operetta: A Sourcebook, Volume II. Cambridge Scholars Publishing. ISBN 9781443885089.
