= Cora Tanner =

American stage actress

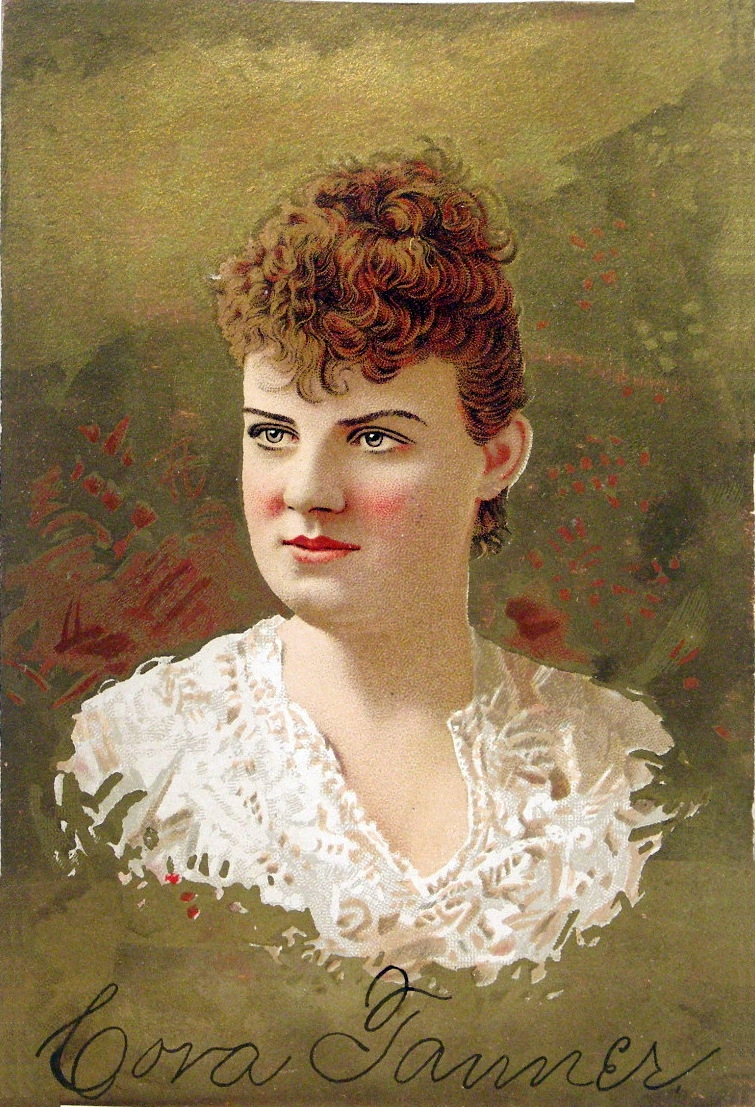
- Born: c. 1861; Cleveland, Ohio, US
- Died: March 1945; Grand Rapids, Michigan, US
- Other names: Cora S. Tanner, Cora Tanner Reed
- Occupation: Actress
- Years active: c. 1870s-1902
- Spouse(s): C. Fred Farlin (1879-83, divorced), William E. Sinn (1886-93, divorced), Charles S. Reed (m. 1903)
- Relatives: Amy Louise Reed (sister-in-law)

Cora Tanner (c. 1861–1945) was an American stage actress who was most popular in the mid-1880s through her retirement from the stage in 1902.

== Biography ==
Tanner was born in Cleveland, Ohio around 1861. She first appeared on stage at McVicker's Theater in Chicago; she reported she was 14 at the time. She first appeared in London in 1880. She was the first American Princess Ida in the Gilbert and Sullivan opera of the same name in 1884. The 1901 book Players of the Present opined that "since the beginning of the season of 1885-86 she has been constantly before the public more or less prominently as a star," reporting her first success was the role of Annie Meadows in Robert Buchanan's Alone in London (playing the role from 1884 to 1888), and then in 1888 in the same author's play Fascination. In 1895-96, she appeared in the Broadway hit The Sporting Duchess. In 1900, she portrayed Aurora Borealis in the Broadway musical A Million Dollars. She appears to have retired from the stage in 1902.

As typical of a stage star of her day, her personal life was occasionally news fodder, including her public divorce from Colonel William E. Sinn, a Brooklyn theatre manager. Sinn tried to claim that Tanner's first marriage to Fred Farlin had never ended, making their marriage invalid, but lost that claim. Occasionally, there were comments in the news about her weight, which tended to be a bit on the heavier side. In 1899, reports ran that she almost died from eating poisoned candy that was left at her hotel by a messenger. In 1903, Tanner married Charles S. Reed in New York, and public coverage of her essentially ceased.

Tanner died in March 1945 in Grand Rapids, Michigan, at a reported age of 84.
