= 1492 Up to Date =

Musical burlesque by R. A. Barnet

1492 Up to Date; or, Very Near It (sometimes titled 1492) is a burlesque extravaganza created in 1892 in observance of the quadricentennial of Columbus's expedition to the New World. The libretto is by R. A. Barnet. with music by Carl Pflueger. Its Broadway production was presented by Edward E. Rice's "Surprise Party" in 1893. The plot centers on Columbus, but in burlesque style, it has little to do with his historical story.

The show has been described as "a musical, historical, mellow drama [sic] that threw together bits of opera comique, comic opera, stereopticon projections, extravaganza, farce-comedy, vaudeville, local comedy, burlesque, and even minstrelsy."

== Productions ==
It was originally written for and presented by the Boston Independent Corps of Cadets in February 1892. The show opened in New York City on May 15, 1893, at Palmer's Theatre, to a sold-out and overflowing audience, produced by Rice's Surprise Party. The New York Times called the show "wild nonsense" that provoked "wholesome laughter" with "manifest intelligence and abundant humor" and noted that, by the end, the audience was calling for half a dozen encores of each song. It ran over two seasons, and in two different houses, for 452 performances. After this, it was performed in revival and toured for several years, with alterations and additional characters. During an 1895 revival, Queen Isabella was portrayed by Marie Dressler.

== Plot ==
King Ferdinand's treasurer complains that the kingdom is short of funds. The king has been out having too much fun all night. Queen Isabella and Columbus arrive, and both go mad. Soon Columbus is in front of the Fifth Avenue Hotel in New York amidst a crowd of colorful New York types, such as newsboys, chorus girls, vagabonds and vendors. Columbus and his entourage of Old World Spaniards are amazed at the behavior of the New Yorkers. When Columbus returns to Spain, the royal family is living in poverty, doing their own washing. The royal family is amazed and amused by the explorers' stories of the New World. All ends happily.

== Characters and original cast ==
- Ferdinand of Aragon, King of Spain – Walter Jones
- Charley Tatters, a fringe on the edge of the crust of society – Walter Jones
- Alonzo de Quintanilla, royal treasurer – Edward M. Favor
- Don Juan, the King's son, aged four – Will H. Sloan
- Felix, of the tribe of coppers – Will H. Sloan
- Martin Pinzon, conspirator of the old-fashioned type – Charles F. Walton
- Don Pedro Magarritte, conspirator of the old-fashioned type – John C. Slavin
- Charles VIII, King of France – Louise de Smith
- Don Ferdinand Allegro, a regular "chappie" up to date – Yolande Wallace
- Adolphus Fitzfoozle, a regular "chappie" up to date – Yolande Wallace
- Maid Marian, a sailor lassie – Yolande Wallace
- Maid Mabel, a sailor lassie – Eileen Karl
- Jim Confidence, of the tribe of buncoes – C. J. Alden
- Erasmus, a vendor of maize – Gilbert Gregory
- Isabella of Castille – Richard Harlow
- Fräulein, a German waif – Theresa Vaughn
- Infanta Joanna, in love with Columbus – Theresa Vaughn
- Infanta Catalina, her sister – Hattie Williams
- Bridga de Murphy, of the royal household of the new world – Edith Sinclair
- Mary Ann Kehoe, of the royal household of the new world – Edith Sinclair
- Christopher Columbus – Mark Smith

== Songs ==
Act 1

- Chorus – "Give us cash, give us cash"
- Treasurer and chorus – (arranged from Genée) "What provokes a gladsome smile"
- Joanna and Columbus – "I've dared to whisper that I love thee"
- King and chorus – "You all think dignity does pervade royalty"
- Grand Processional and Ballet – "Ferdinand of Aragon"
- Queen and chorus – "Isabella is a sov'reign of notoriety"
- Spanish Dance (by Aberano Colon)
- Finale Act I, Chorus and Queen – "Adios bella Hispania"

Act 2

- Columbus and chorus – "Toss'd and shaken by the billows of the deep"
- Chorus of Newsboys – "Herald, Tribune and Times"
- Conspirators' Music
- Casino Girls' Chorus – "We are careless chorus maidens"
- Finale Act II – "Our national song, what is it?"

Act 3

- Barcarolle (arr. from a Spanish air) – "Ye mariners of Spain, bring back my love again"
- Vocal March-Return of Columbus – "Onward, onward with great pomp and show"
- Amazon March (Spanish)
- Ballet Music and Solo
- Finale (Columbus, Joanne & Company) – "Now the prize is mine"

== Archival materials ==
Many of the original performance materials are housed in the library of the University of Wisconsin–Madison.
