= Frederic Ranken =

American librettist, lyricist and playwright

Frederic G. Ranken (c. 1869 – October 19, 1905, in Manhattan) was an American librettist, lyricist, and playwright for light operas and musicals staged on Broadway from 1899 through 1907. His greatest success was the libretto for Reginald De Koven's 1905 comic opera Happyland. He also wrote libretti for composers Victor Herbert and Ludwig Engländer, and was a lyricist for composers Alfred Baldwin Sloane and Gustave Kerker among others. As a playwright he wrote the books for several musicals.

== Life and career ==
Frederic G. Ranken was born in Troy, New York, the son of the owner of an electrical works in that city. He was educated at schools in his home town and began his professional life working for his father. He was the librettist for Victor Herbert's 1899 operetta The Ameer which was staged at Broadway's Wallack's Theatre. He was also the librettist for Ludwig Engländer's opera The Jewel of Asia (1903, Criterion Theatre) and Reginald De Koven's Happyland (1905, Lyric Theatre); the latter the greatest success of his career. His final libretto was for De Koven's operetta The Student King which premiered posthumously at the Garden Theatre on Christmas Day 1906 and continued to run at that theatre into 1907.

Ranken wrote both the book and lyrics for several Broadway musicals, including The Chaperons (1902, composer Isidore Witmark); Nancy Brown (1903, composer Henry K. Hadley); and The Gingerbread Man (1905, composer Alfred Baldwin Sloane. He also was a lyricist for songs written by Gustave Kerker for the 1903 musical Winsome Winnie which was staged at the Casino Theatre.

Ranken died of yellow fever at the age of 36 in Manhattan on October 19, 1905.

== Bibliography ==
- Bordman, Gerald Martin; Norton, Richard (2010). American Musical Theatre: A Chronicle. Oxford University Press. ISBN 9780199729708.
- Dietz, Dan (2022). The Complete Book of 1900s Broadway Musicals. Rowman & Littlefield Publishers. ISBN 9781538168943.
- Andrew L. Erdman (2012). Queen of Vaudeville: The Story of Eva Tanguay. Cornell University Press. ISBN 9780801465727.
- Letellier, Robert Ignatius (2015). Operetta: A Sourcebook, Volume II. Cambridge Scholars Publishing. ISBN 9781443885089.
- Margaret Ross Griffel (2013). Operas in English: A Dictionary. Scarecrow Press. ISBN 9780810883253.
- Letellier, Robert Ignatius (2015). Operetta: A Sourcebook, Volume II. Cambridge Scholars Publishing. ISBN 9781443885089.
