= Theresa Vaughn =

American actress

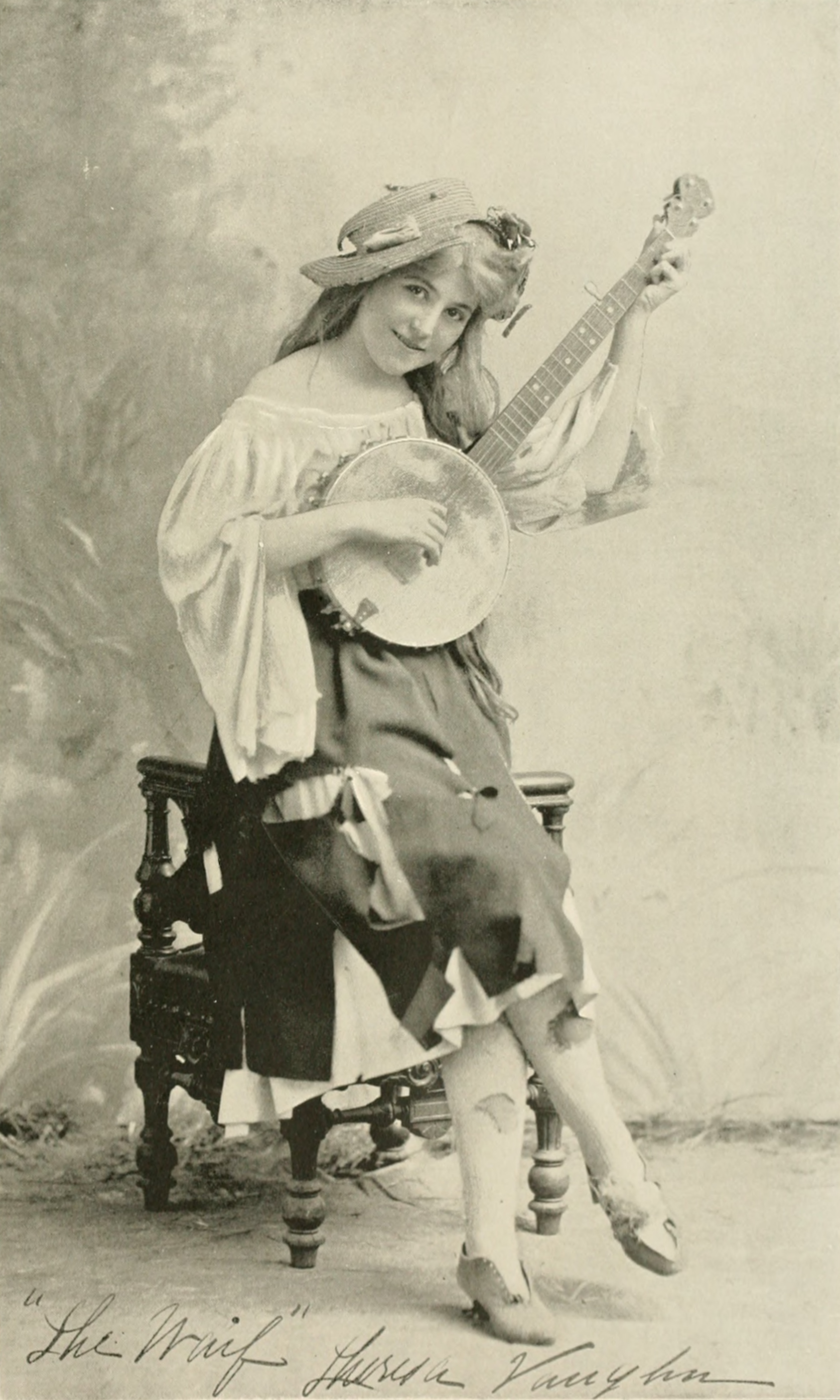
- Vaughn as "The Waif" in 1492 Up to Date
- Born: c. 1867
- Died: October 5, 1903; Worcester, Massachusetts
- Years active: 1880s-1899
- Spouse: William A. Mestayer (1846-1896)

Theresa Vaughn (1867-1903) was a popular American singer and comedian in the 1890s.

She was a hit on Broadway in 1492 Up to Date, where she played banjo and sang songs in German in the role of Fraulein, the Waif, and appeared in other productions including Excelsior Jr.. She also had success on tour with The Tourists in a Pullman Car.

She was born Theresa Ott in New York City, her family having a theatrical reputation in the Boston area. Of German descent, she studied music in New York City and Dresden. Her performance as Tessa in The Gondoliers in Boston was her first operatic success.

Her husband, William H. Mestayer (William Haupt by birth), was an actor and her manager; she first appeared is his company in We, Us & Co. in the 1880s. After he died in late 1896, she took a break from the stage. By 1899, she retired from the stage permanently, reportedly on account of a failing memory. In 1901 she was committed by her mother to an insane asylum, reportedly due to "melancholia" caused by the death of her husband and brother. She died at the Worcester Insane Asylum on October 5, 1903.
