= Academy of Music (Baltimore) =

Music venue from 1875 until 1927

Coordinates: 39.29560°N 76.62040°W

The Academy of Music in Baltimore, Maryland was an important music venue in that city after opening in 1875 following the American Civil War. The Academy was located at 516 North Howard Street. The Academy was closed and demolished in 1927 for the construction of the Stanley Theatre, Baltimore's largest and most opulent theatre.
