= China Rose (operetta) =

1924 operetta

China Rose is an operetta in two acts with music by A. Baldwin Sloane, and both lyrics and book by Harry L. Cort and George E. Stoddard. The work premiered in Boston at the Hollis Street Theatre on Christmas Eve of 1924. On December 30, 1924 portions of the work were performed by a live orchestra on WNAC (1260 AM) radio in Boston.

The production moved to Broadway at the Martin Beck Theatre on January 19, 1925. In the midst of its Broadway run the production transferred twice, first to Wallack's Theatre and then the Knickerbocker Theatre. The production ended its run at the latter theatre on May 9, 1925; closing after 120 performances.

The Broadway production was directed by R. H. Burnside and co-produced by Martin Beck, John Cort, and Charles Dillingham. It starred baritone J. Harold Murray as Cha Ming, the Prince of Manchuria, and Olga Steck as the prince's love interest, Ro See, a.k.a. the "China Rose". It was the final stage work created by A. Baldwin Sloane.
