= Elmo Live =

2008 Fisher-Price toy

Elmo Live! is a 2008 Fisher-Price toy based on the Sesame Street character Elmo. The toy was Fisher-Price's latest effort to build on the success of the 1996 Tickle Me Elmo doll and the 2006 T.M.X. Elmo. The red, furry doll can move his head as he speaks, and he can clap, sing, dance, tell stories and jokes, and play games. He can sense when he's being hugged, and respond appropriately. He has sensors on his foot, tummy, back and nose. The toy was designed over a period of two years, building sophisticated electronic controls hidden inside the red plush doll.

The toy was first announced at the New York Toy Fair in February 2008. It was released nationwide on October 14, 2008. Jim Silver, editor-in-chief of Toys & Family Entertainment magazine, said, "There's no question this toy is going to be this season's must-have toy. While past Elmos could dance, laugh, or say funny things, this Elmo has a ton of content. The movement is amazing... it makes him seem lifelike." The doll's human-like attributes, along with a video showing an Elmo Live being set on fire, inspired thought experiments about whether robotic dolls should have human rights.

However, there was concern over the toy's price. The retail price was $60, "above the $50 price tag that once was the high-water mark for most toys."
