= Olympia Theatre (New York City) =

Former theater complex in Manhattan, New York

Coordinates: 40.75738°N 73.98570°W

- Hammerstein's Olympia, New York Theatre, Loew's New York, Criterion Theatre, Vitagraph Theatre
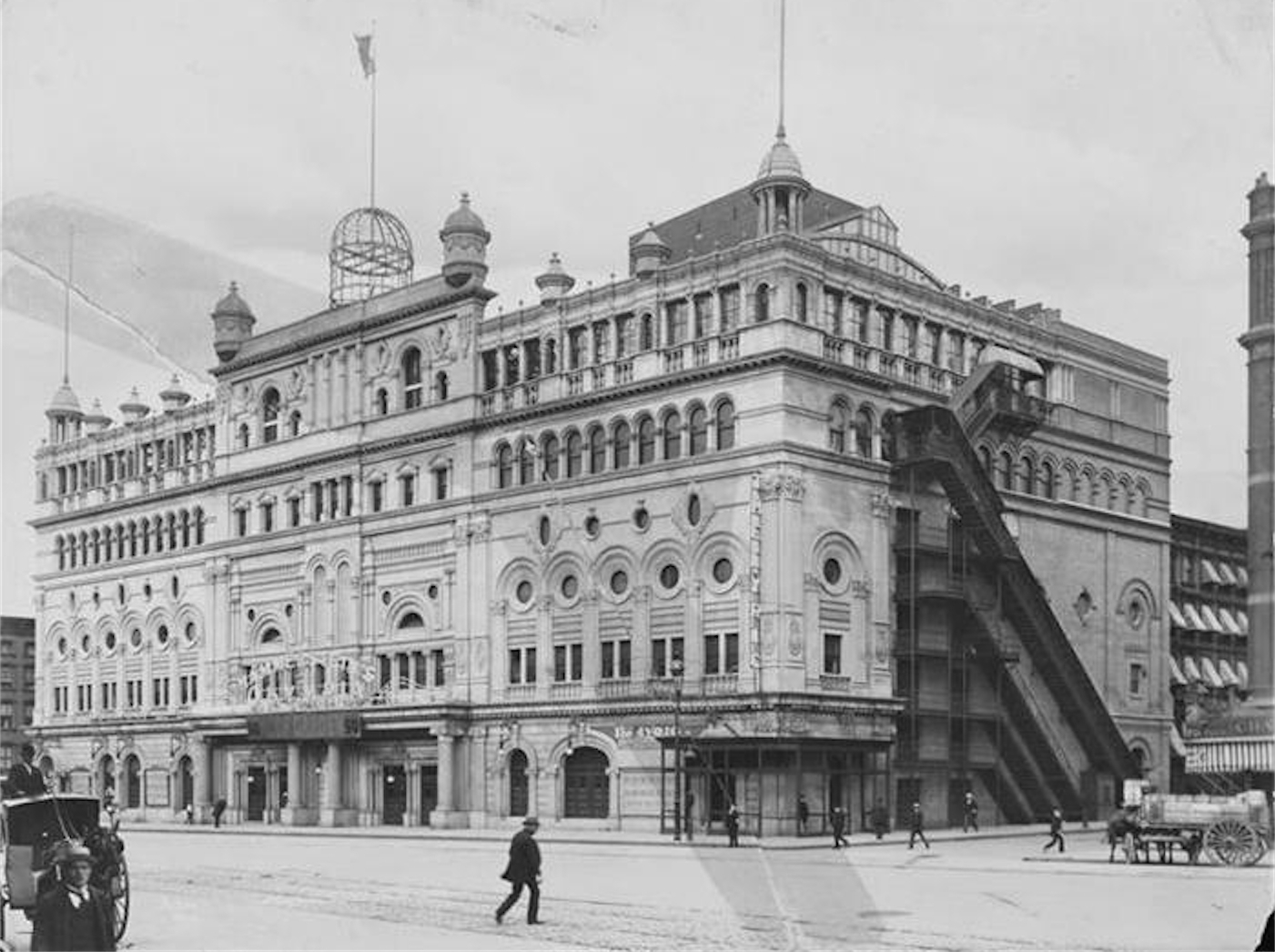
- Hammerstein's Olympia
- Interactive map of Olympia Theatre
- Address: 1514–16 Broadway; New York City; United States
- Type: Broadway
- Current use: restaurant

Construction
- Opened: 1895
- Rebuilt: 1935
- Years active: 1890–1935; 1936-2000
- Architect: J. B. McElfatrick & Son

The Olympia Theatre (1514–16 Broadway at 44th Street), also known as Hammerstein's Olympia and later the Lyric Theatre and the New York Theatre, was a theater complex built by impresario Oscar Hammerstein I at Longacre Square (later Times Square) in Manhattan, New York City, opening in 1895.

It consisted of a theater, a music hall, a concert hall, and a roof garden. Later, sections of the structure were substantially remodeled and used for both live theatre and for motion pictures. As a cinema, it was also known at various times as the Vitagraph Theatre and the Criterion Theatre.

== History ==
According to The New York Times, the Olympia was a "massive gray stone building", and extended 203 feet (62 m) on Longacre Square, 104 feet (32 m) on 45th Street, and 101 feet (31 m) on 44th Street. It was made from Indiana limestone, featured an imposing façade, and followed French Renaissance designs. It was designed by J. B. McElfatrick & Son. The building opened on November 25, 1895 with the Broadway debut of Excelsior, Jr., with over 30 performers from Europe appearing. It was the second theater to open in what is now known as the Theater District. (The first was the Empire Theatre, on the southeast corner of 40th Street and Broadway.) The complex consisted of the Music Hall, a large variety theater, the Lyric, a legitimate theater, the Concert Hall, for smaller music performances, and a rooftop garden theater.

In 1898, Hammerstein was forced to sell the complex to settle debts from its construction. The venues were sold separately, with the Music Hall becoming the New York Theatre, which became part of the Loew's movie theater chain in 1915. The Lyric was renamed the Criterion Theatre. From 1914 to 1916 it operated as the Vitagraph Theatre, leased by the Vitagraph Company for prestige motion pictures including The Battle Cry of Peace, before returning to the Criterion name. It permanently switched to cinema use in 1920. The rooftop garden theater was leased by Florenz Ziegfeld and hosted the first five editions of the Ziegfeld Follies under the name Jardin de Paris, named for the location in Paris of the Moulin Rouge. It, too, became a movie theater. The complex was demolished in 1935.

== Subsequent site use ==
After the old venues were demolished, architects Thomas W. Lamb and Eugene De Rosa designed a new building on the site which included a new Criterion Theatre cinema, the International Casino nightclub, and retail space. The nightclub closed after only two years, and the space became a Bond Clothing Stores location until 1977. It was then reconverted to a discotheque, Bond International Casino, which closed in 1986. The cinema was multiplexed in 1980.

In 1988, a portion of the former nightclub space was converted was to a pair of live theater spaces called the Criterion Center. In 1991, the spaces were leased to Roundabout Theatre Company, a prominent non-profit theater company, which used the larger Stage Right space as a small Tony Award-eligible theater while the smaller second theater became the first version of the Laura Pels Theatre. Notable productions during Roundabout's tenure at the Criterion include the 1993 revival of Eugene O'Neill's Anna Christie (featuring Liam Neeson and Natasha Richardson in their Broadway debuts), the 1995 revival of Stephen Sondheim's Company, and the 1997 revival of 1776. The company left the space in 2000 when their lease was canceled.

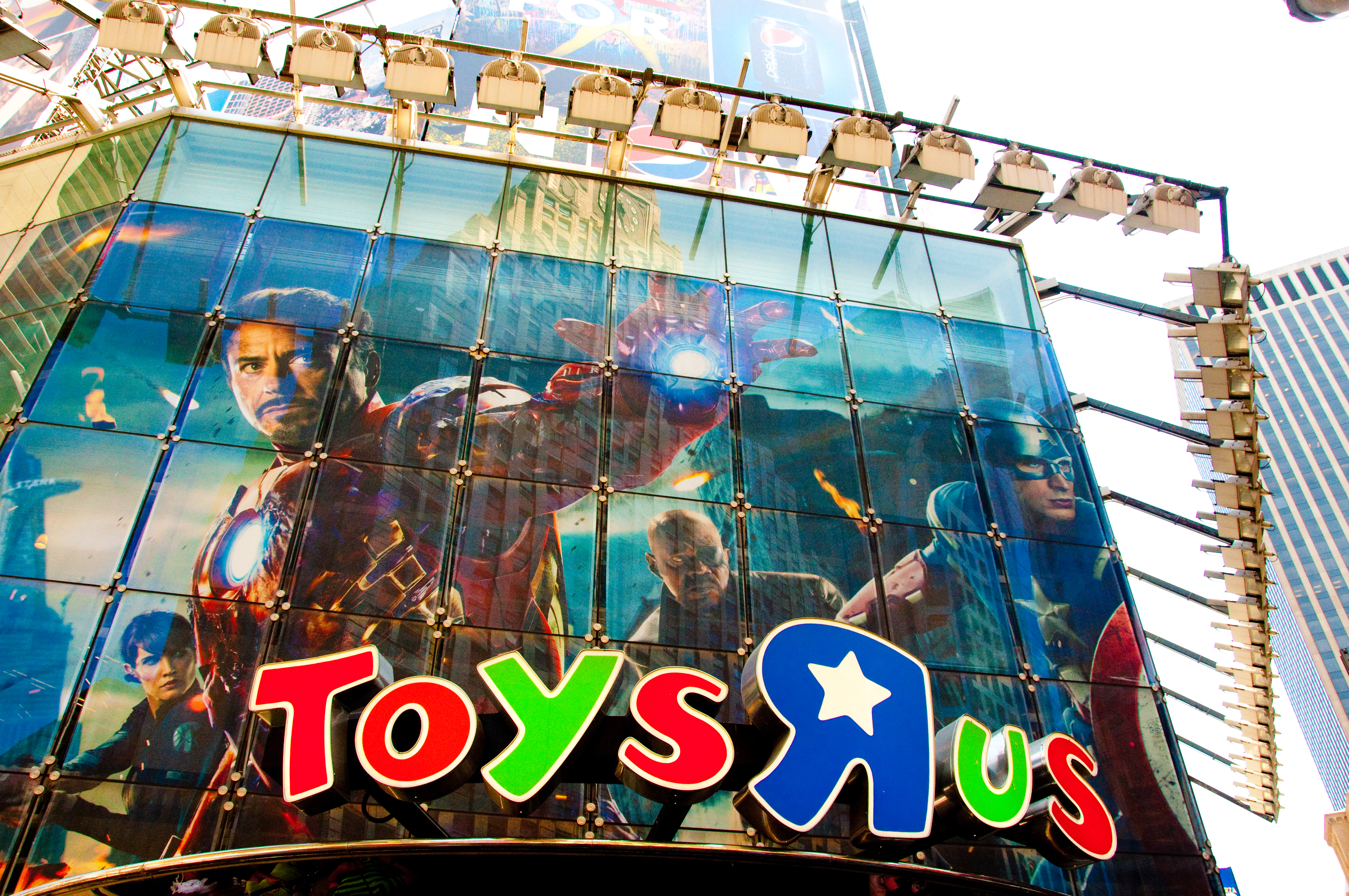
The Toys "R" Us Times Square store in 2012.

In 2001, Toys "R" Us built a flagship store in the building, leading to the closure of both the cinema and the live theater venues. The multilevel store featured a 60-foot in-store Ferris Wheel and an animatronic T-rex among its attractions. Upon expiration of its lease, Toys "R" Us closed on December 30, 2015. The decision was attributed primarily to a rise in property values in Times Square that would increase its rent from $12 million to upwards of $42 million a year. In June 2015, Gap Inc. signed a lease for the property and expected to open stores for its Gap and Old Navy brands in 2017. The two stores account for 62,000 square feet of the 100,000-square-foot store. In July 2016, during the construction of the Gap and Old Navy flagship store, remnants of the original Olympia were found under the floors. The building, known officially as the Bow Tie Building, remains owned by Bow Tie Partners, the real estate holding company tied to Bow Tie Cinemas, the chain operated by the Moss family.

== Cherry Blossom Grove ==
The Cherry Blossom Grove was a second theatre located on the rooftop of the Olympia Theatre.

== Partial list of notable productions ==
=== Original venues ===
- The Gay Lord Quex (1900)
- A Million Dollars (1900)
- When Knighthood Was in Flower (1901)
- The King's Carnival (1901)
- Florodora (1901)
- In Dahomey (1903)
- Happyland (1905)

=== Criterion Center Stage Right ===
- The Price (1992 revival)
- Anna Christie (1993 revival)
- She Loves Me (1993 revival)
- A Month in the Country (1995 revival)
- Company (1995 revival)
- 1776 (1997 revival)
- The Lion in Winter (1999 revival)

=== Toys "R" Us ===
- Noises Off (November 17, 2001 - September 1, 2002)
- Times Square Ball Drop (December 31, 2001 - January 1, 2015)
- Into the Woods (2002 revival) (April 13 - December 29, 2002)
- Blue's Clues Live: Blue's Birthday Party (April 26 - May 5, 2002)
- The Lion King (September 15, 2002 - September 10, 2006)
- Beauty and the Beast (February 4, 2003 - September 10, 2006)
- Tune in and Play Sweepstakes Contest with the Grammy Foundation and Between the Lions (February 20, 2003)
- A Year with Frog and Toad (April 13 - June 15, 2003)
- Dora the Explorer Live: Search for the City of Lost Toys (April 18-27, 2003)
- Times Square's 100th Anniversary Ceremony (April 8 - December 31, 2004)
- Blue’s Clues and Blue’s Room Live Concert Launch Event (September 17, 2004)
- The Wiggles in Concert (October 16, 2004)
- Tarzan (September 10, 2006)
- Barney's Big Purple Bus Tour (January 26, 2008)
- Playhouse Disney Toy Launch (September 20, 2008)
- Gordon and Elmo - Live! (October 13, 2008)
- Nickelodeon Great Big Toy Run (October 25, 2010 - May 29, 2013)

== Bibliography ==
- Bordman, Gerald Martin; Norton, Richard (2010). American Musical Theatre: A Chronicle. Oxford University Press. ISBN 9780199729708.
