= Bowdoin Square Theatre =

Coordinates: 42.3612°N 71.0614°W

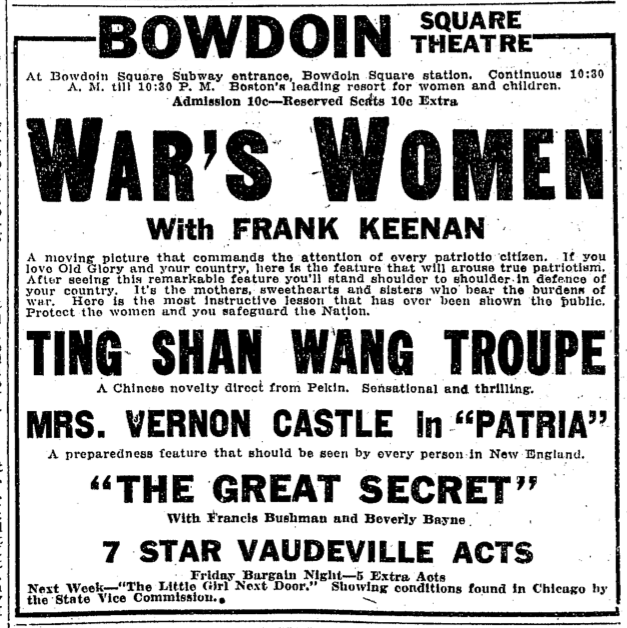
Advertisement, 1917

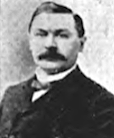
Portrait of manager Charles F. Atkinson

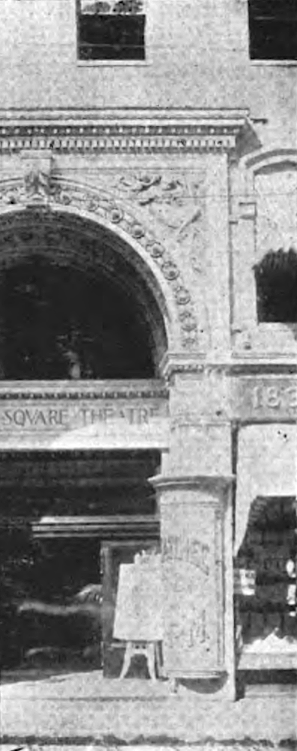
Bowdoin Sq. Theatre, ca.1896

The Bowdoin Square Theatre (est.1892) in Boston, Massachusetts, was a playhouse and cinema. It was located on Bowdoin Square in the West End, in a building designed by architect C.H. Blackall. Personnel included Charles F. Atkinson and William Harris. Audience members included future magician Julius Linsky and future actor Joseph Sicari

== Performances/Screenings ==
=== 1890s ===
- The Dazzler
- A Parlor Match (Evans and Hoey)
- The Idea, with Hallen and Hart
- Sutton Vane's The Span of Life
- Hands Across the Sea
- The Cotton King
- John P. Smith's Uncle Tom's Cabin, with Jenny Kay
- Daniel A. Kelly's Outcasts of a Great City

=== 1900s ===
- The Victorian Cross
- In Sight of St. Pauls, with Zeffie Tilbury
- Utah, with Zeffie Tilbury
- A Break for Liberty
- Two Orphans
- The Cattle King
- Wicked London
- Escaped from Sing Sing

=== 1910s ===
- War's Women ("moving picture"), with Frank Keenan
- Ting Shan Wang Troupe
- Patria (film), with Mrs. Vernon Castle

=== 1920s ===
- Camille (film), with Nazimova
- From the Ground Up (film), with Tom Moore
- Burn 'em up Barnes, with Johnny Hines
- Gleam o' Dawn (film), with John Gilbert
- "Drake and Walker's Big Colored Musical Revue"
