= M. Witmark & Sons =

American publisher of sheet music

M. Witmark & Sons was a leading publisher of sheet music for the United States "Tin Pan Alley" music industry.

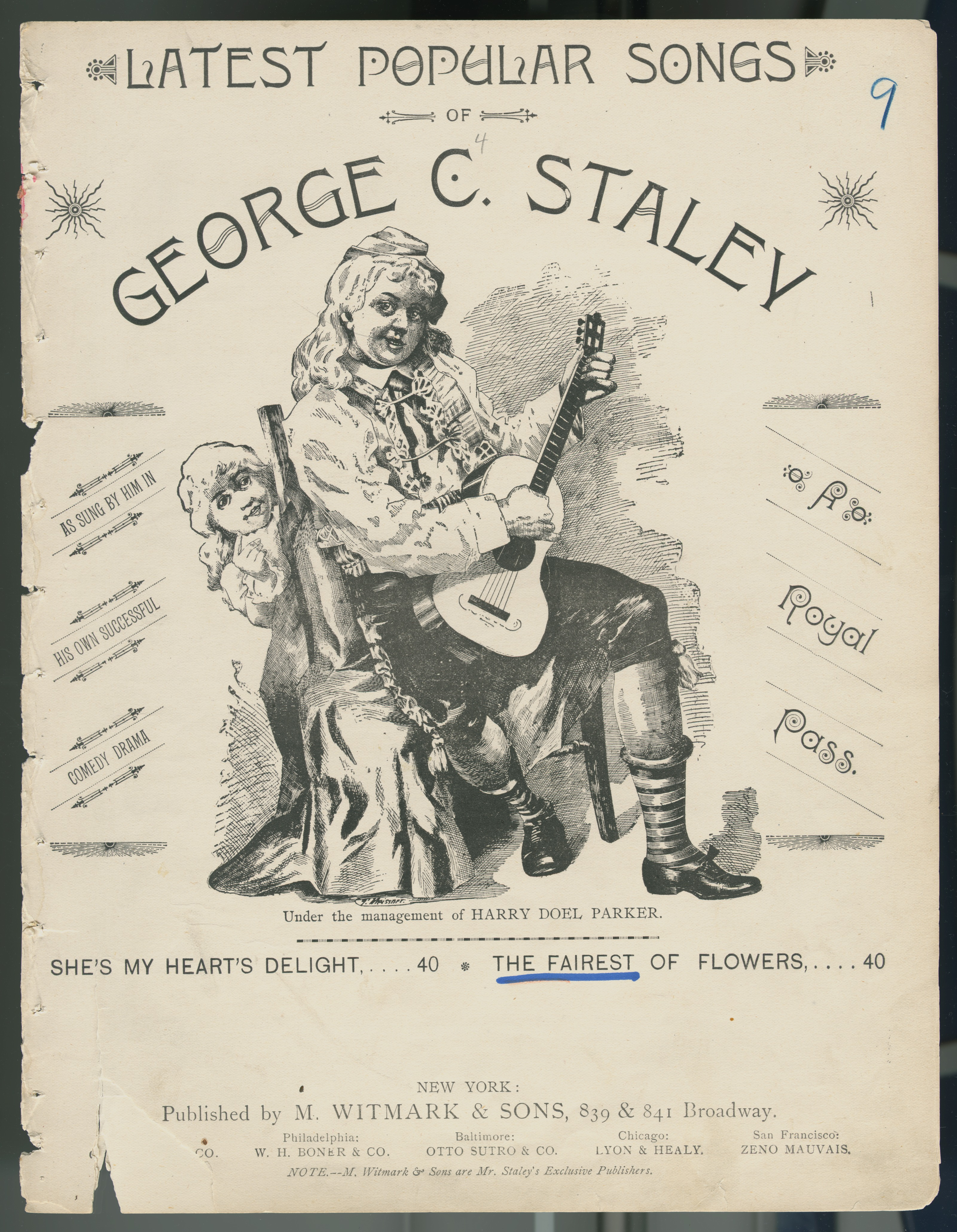
A piece of music published by Witmark and Sons in 1890.

== Origins ==
After winning a toy printing press from school, the Witmark brothers (Isidore, Julius and Jay) opened a printing establishment in their home on West 40th Street in New York City, making Christmas cards. To augment his earnings, Jay began performing ballads in minstrel and variety shows and later decided to publish music.

The firm of Marcus Witmark & Sons was established in New York City in 1886. The father, Marcus Witmark, was the legal head of the company; but from the beginning it was run by his sons Isidore, Julius, and Jay, who were under legal age when the company started (ranging in age from 17 to 14 years old). They started out publishing their own compositions. They were adept at plugging songs, and within a few years were publishing the works of such composers as Victor Herbert, George M. Cohan, Louise Christine Rebe, Ben Harney, Pauline B. Story, and John Walter Bratton.

In 1888, M. Witmark & Sons LP relocated to 32 East 14th Street in Manhattan, becoming the first music publisher to settle into the theatre district. Isadore found the contracts, and Julius sang and demonstrated the songs, thereby becoming the first song pluggers in the young industry. Some of the publisher's early hit songs included "After the Ball" by Charles K. Harris and "Sweet Adeline" by Harry Armstrong and Richard H. Gerard.

Witmark originated the practice of giving free "professional copies" of their new music to famous and established singers and bands, which proved so successful an advertising method that it was copied by the rest of the music publishers.

When the International Copyright Law was passed in 1891, Witmark pioneered publishing versions of British music in the United States and arranging for American hits to be published in the UK.

== Family ==
Witmark Family
Relationship	Name	Birth	Death	Notes
Father	Marcus; Witmark	1834; Prussia	Mar. 29, 1910; Manhattan	Married Peyser Oct. 4, 1866
Mother	Hennrietta Witmark née Peyser	1840; Prussia	Dec. 14, 1906; Manhattan
Son	Isidore; Witmark	1870; Manhattan	Apr. 19, 1941; Manhattan
Son	Julius ("Julie") Peyser; Witmark	1871; Manhattan	June 14, 1929; Manhattan
Son	Jacob ("Jay"); Witmark	Mar. 31, 1872; Manhattan	Feb. 1950; Manhattan	One of the nine founding members of ASCAP in 1914
Son	Frank Morris; Witmark	1875; Manhattan	Aug 3, 1948; Weehawken, NJ
Son	Edward; Witmark	1877; Manhattan
Daughter	Frances Klein (Mrs. Joseph A. Klein) née Witmark	1874; Manhattan	1957; Manhattan	Married Klein Jan. 11, 1905; Manhattan
Son	Adolph S. Witmark	1882; Manhattan	July 15, 1926; Manhattan

== Succession of ownership ==
Tams-Witmark

In 1922, Sargent Aborn (1867–1956), brother of Milton Aborn (1864–1933), both of the Aborn Opera Company, acquired the Arthur W. Tams (1848–1927) music library, a collection that had become the largest circulating music library in the world — and by extension, Witmark's biggest competitor in the music-rental field. In January of 1925, M. Witmark & Sons acquired the music Tams library, ending 30 years of intense rivalry. The combined Tams-Witmark library, operating as the Tam-Witmark Music Library Inc. (a New York corporation) secured its position as the largest source of musical-comedy and operatic music for amateur and professional productions. Sargent Aborn was president of Tams-Witmark from its founding until his death in 1957. In 1942, Sargent Aborn and his son, Louis Henry Aborn (1912–2005), acquired the rights to the Tams Library. As of 2014, the co-chairmen were Robert Aborn Hut (born 1935) and Sargent Louis Aborn (born 1948) and the executive vice-president was Peter Aborn Hut (born 1940). All three are grandchildren of Sargent Aborn. Tams-Witmark was acquired by Concord in 2018.

In the 1960s, Tams-Witmark donated several lots of its old inventory to the special collections of five libraries known for music research: the Library of Congress, the Eastman School of Music, Westminster Choir College, and the largest part of its inventory to the University of Wisconsin–Madison, through the initiative of the Wisconsin Center for Film and Theater Research and the School of Music.

The consolidation of Tams and Witmark mostly affected operatic music and musical theatre. It did not affect the separate concern of M. Witmark & Sons, music publishers, who continued publishing popular and classical music.

Warner Bros.

In 1929, M. Witmark was purchased by Warner Bros. Warner Bros. merged its music publishing companies (which included Witmark, Remick, and Harms) into one company, Warner Bros. Music (now Warner/Chappell Music).

Alfred Music

In 2005, Alfred Music purchased Warner Bros. Publications — acquiring the publishing rights to Warner/Chappell Music and the EMI Music Publishing Catalogue Partnership. Through this deal, Alfred Music gained the print rights of publishers that include M. Witmark & Sons, Remick Music Corp., and T.B. Harms, Inc. Among the EMI holdings are the Robbins and Leo Feist catalogs, plus film music from United Artists, MGM, and 20th Century Fox.

== See also ==
- American popular music
- Tams-Witmark

Competitor music publishing firms in Tin Pan Alley

- Leo Feist, Inc. – 231 W 40th St, New York, NY
- T.B. Harms & Francis, Day & Hunter, Inc. – 62 W. 45th St., New York, NY
- Shapiro, Bernstein & Co., Inc. – 218 W. 47th St., New York, NY
- Watterson, Berlin & Snyder, Inc. – 1571 Broadway, New York, NY (sold in bankruptcy to Mills Music in 1929)
