= J. Aldrich Libbey =

American singer

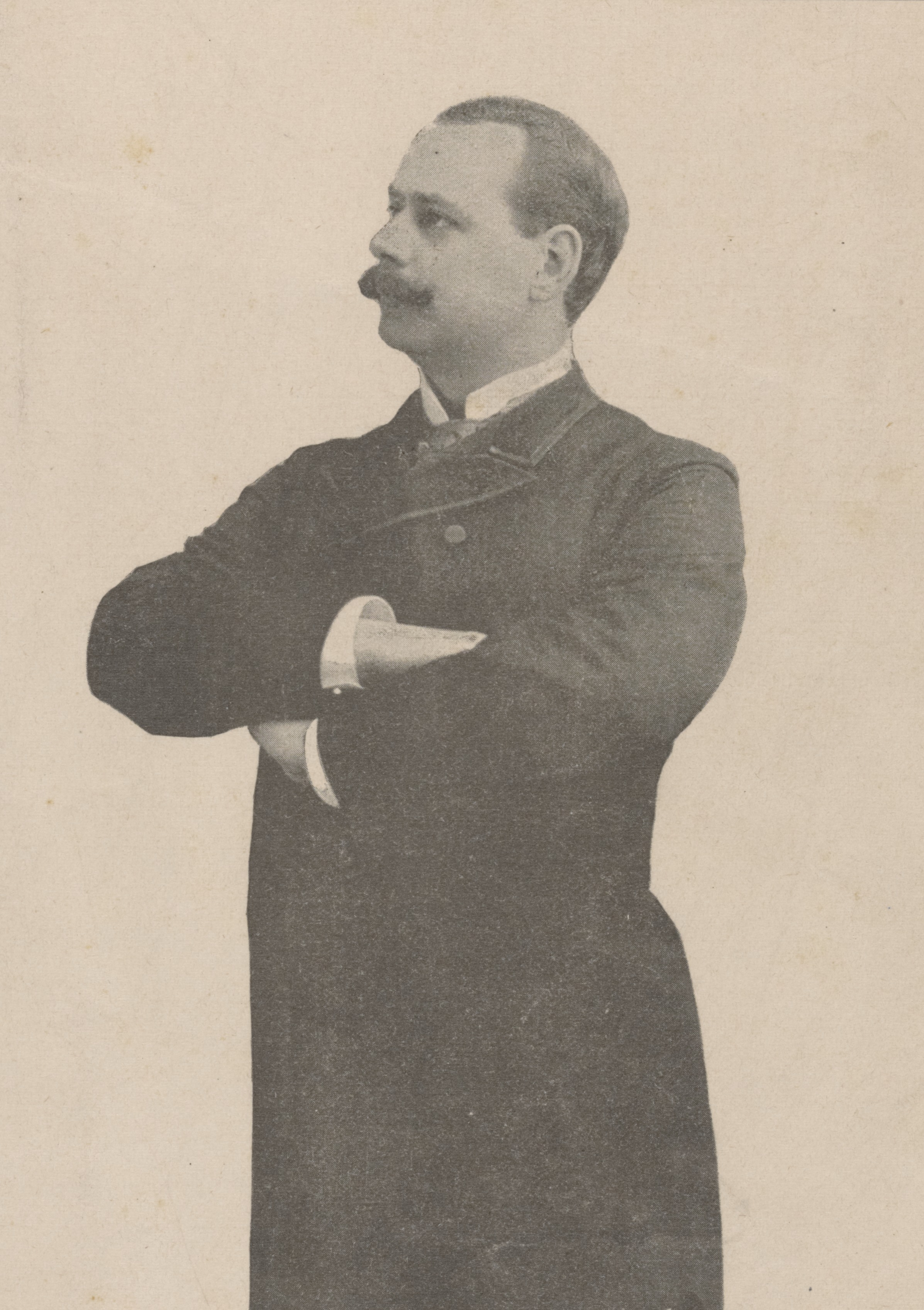
J. Aldrich Libbey

James Aldrich Libbey (February 29, 1864 – April 29, 1925) was an American vaudeville performer, actor, singer and songwriter, best known for launching the song "After the Ball".

== Biography ==
Libbey was born and grew up in East Somerville, Massachusetts. He was noted as a boy soprano, and in 1884 had his first professional engagement at the Bijou Theatre in Boston. In 1885 he traveled to Europe, and studied in Paris — where he studied for a prize at the Conservatoire — and London, before returning to the US. He appeared in grand and comic opera, oratorios, cantatas and concerts, and was contracted to the Boston Symphony Orchestra as a soloist. He then worked for the Little Tycoon and Conreid opera companies, and with the Hallen & Hart company.

By about 1888 he was a well-known vaudeville performer, based in New York City, and known for his ability to popularize new songs. He was described as a high baritone. He married vaudeville singer Katherine Trayer around 1889; they toured together as a duo, including a visit to Australia in 1896.

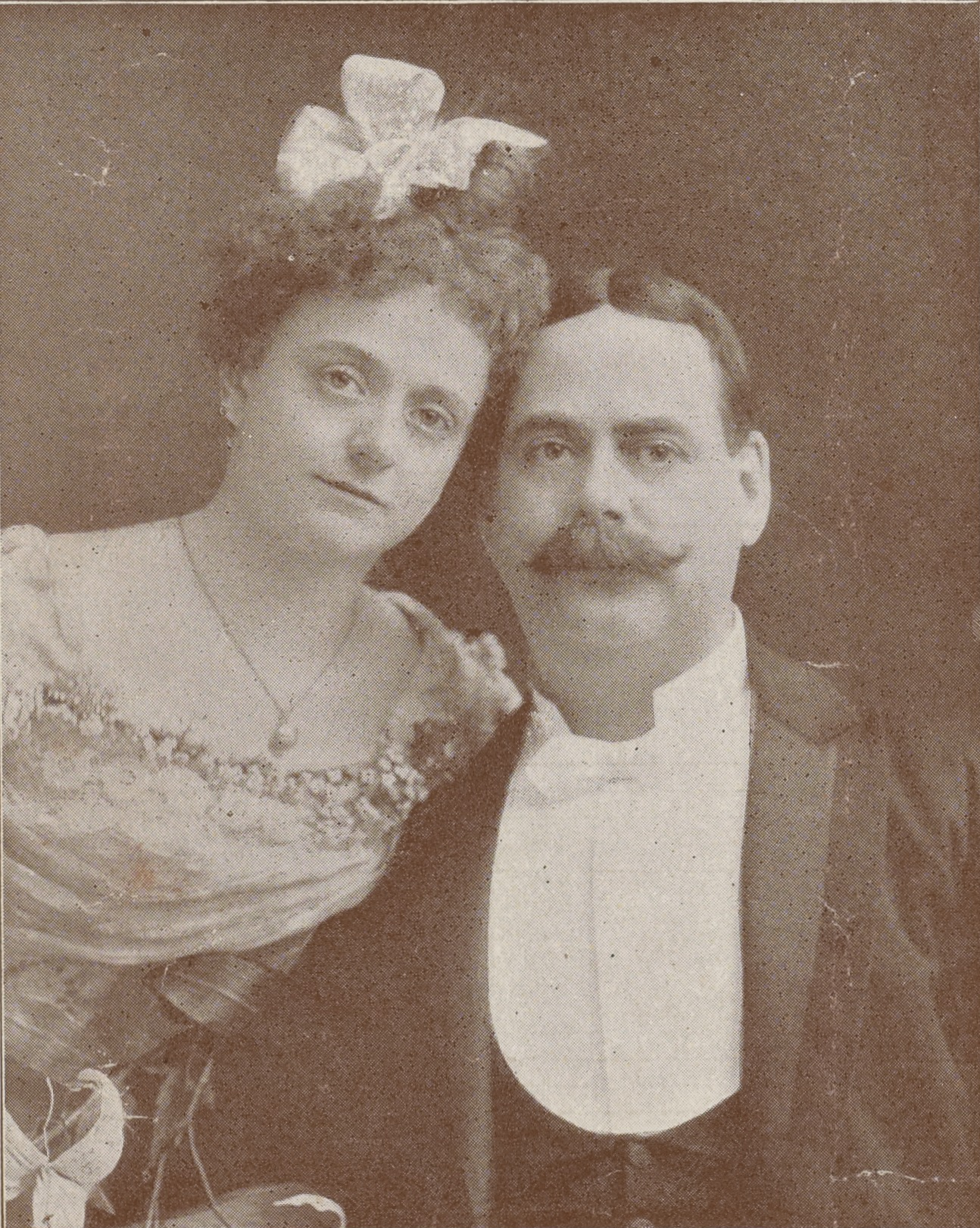
The husband and wife duo of Libbey and Trayer

In 1892 songwriter Charles K. Harris offered Libbey $500, and a share of the royalties, if he would perform Harris' song "After the Ball" in Libbey's show, A Trip to Chinatown, which was one of the most popular touring shows of the decade. Libbey agreed, and, as he performed the song around the US, demands for the song's sheet music grew. It is estimated that, eventually, over 5 million copies of the music were sold. The immense success of the song, as performed by Libbey, is widely credited with stimulating the birth of "Tin Pan Alley", where commercial songwriters began to compete with each other to "plug" new songs in order to attract the most sales among the public. Libbey himself is described as "one of the first... professional popularizers... who frankly abandoned an artistic career for the greater profits of the Alley."

Libbey reputedly introduced more songs and hits than any other performer of his day, looking for what he saw as human interest stories in their words. By 1895 he set up his own publishing company in New York. His recordings included "The Song The Soldiers Sang" (1902), "On a Sunday Afternoon" (1902), and "In the Sweet Bye and Bye" (1903). He continued to perform in light opera, comedy and vaudeville, appearing in 1907 with Katherine Trayer in Playing the Ponies. As a writer, Libbey's songs included "You'll Want Someone To Love You When You're Old" and "In the Apple Blossom Time".

In 1911 Libbey wrote a magazine article in The Player in support of the "White Rats", a labor union organization of vaudeville performers. He wrote that art was the result of labor, rather than the divine gift of genius, and that proficiently executed labor was "art". He became an active member of the National Vaudeville Artists.

He appeared in the minor role of Mr. Ryer in Erich von Stroheim's film classic, Greed, filmed in 1923 and released the following year.

He died from heart failure in San Francisco, California, in 1925 at the age of 61.
