= The Idea (musical) =

The Idea is a musical with words and music by Joseph Hart. While essentially a comedy, the plot centers around a young man whose destructive life of gambling and drinking is turned around after attending a meeting at the Salvation Army. Scholars have noted similarities of this work to the later 1950 musical Guys and Dolls, but with an aesthetic of musicals and culture of the 1890s.

The original production, featuring Frederick Hallen and Joseph Hart, was produced by Hallen at Bowdoin Square in Boston in November 1892. It then opened in New York City at the Fourteenth Street Theatre on April 9, 1893 and was still playing there in October. In 1894, a revival played in Chicago.

== Roles and New York cast ==
The opening night cast in New York was as follows:

- Peach Blow: Fannie Bloodgood
- Mrs. Morton Howes/Johnny Get: Mollie Fuller
- Nellie Dogood: Margueritte De Mar
- Mary B. Quiet: Carrie De Mar
- Gedney Howes: Loretta Morgan
- Victoria Howes: Edith Murray
- Marlborough Howes: Jennie Grovini
- Morton Howes: J. Aldrich Libbey
- Gilsey Howes: Charles B. Lawlor
- Carl Pretzel: Al. Wilson
- Reed Wallpaper: Albert Hawthorne
- Saunders: Larry Dooley
- Wells Fargo: Richard Reab
- Policeman: Charles Kettler
- Hoffman Howes: Frederick Hallen
- Olean Bradford: Joseph Hart

== Songs ==
Based on the sheet music, the songs included:

- When the Man in the Moon Goes To Sleep
- That Was Me
- A Dream In the Old Arm-Chair
- I Have No Heart, It Still Belongs To Thee
- I Love You In Spite Of It All - by Charles K. Harris
