= We Want Our Daddy Dear, Back Home (Hello Central, Give Me France) =

1918 song written by James M. Reilly and composed by Harry De Costa

Song
- Language: English
- Published: 1918
- Composer(s): Harry De Costa
- Lyricist(s): James M. Reilly

"We Want Our Daddy Dear, Back Home (Hello Central, Give Me France)" is a World War I song written by James M. Reilly and composed by Harry De Costa. The song was first published in 1918 by M. Witmark & Sons in New York City. The sheet music cover features a vitagraph photo of Aida Norton and a seated child.

The sheet music can be found at the Pritzker Military Museum & Library.
