= I'll See You Later Yankeeland =

Song
- Language: English
- Songwriter(s): Charles K. Harris

"I'll See You Later Yankeeland" is a World War I song written and composed by Charles K. Harris. The song was self-published in 1917 by Charles K. Harris in New York, NY. The sheet music cover features a photo of soldiers waving from the deck of a ship.

The sheet music can be found at the Pritzker Military Museum & Library.
