= Bring Me a Letter from My Old Home Town =

1918 song

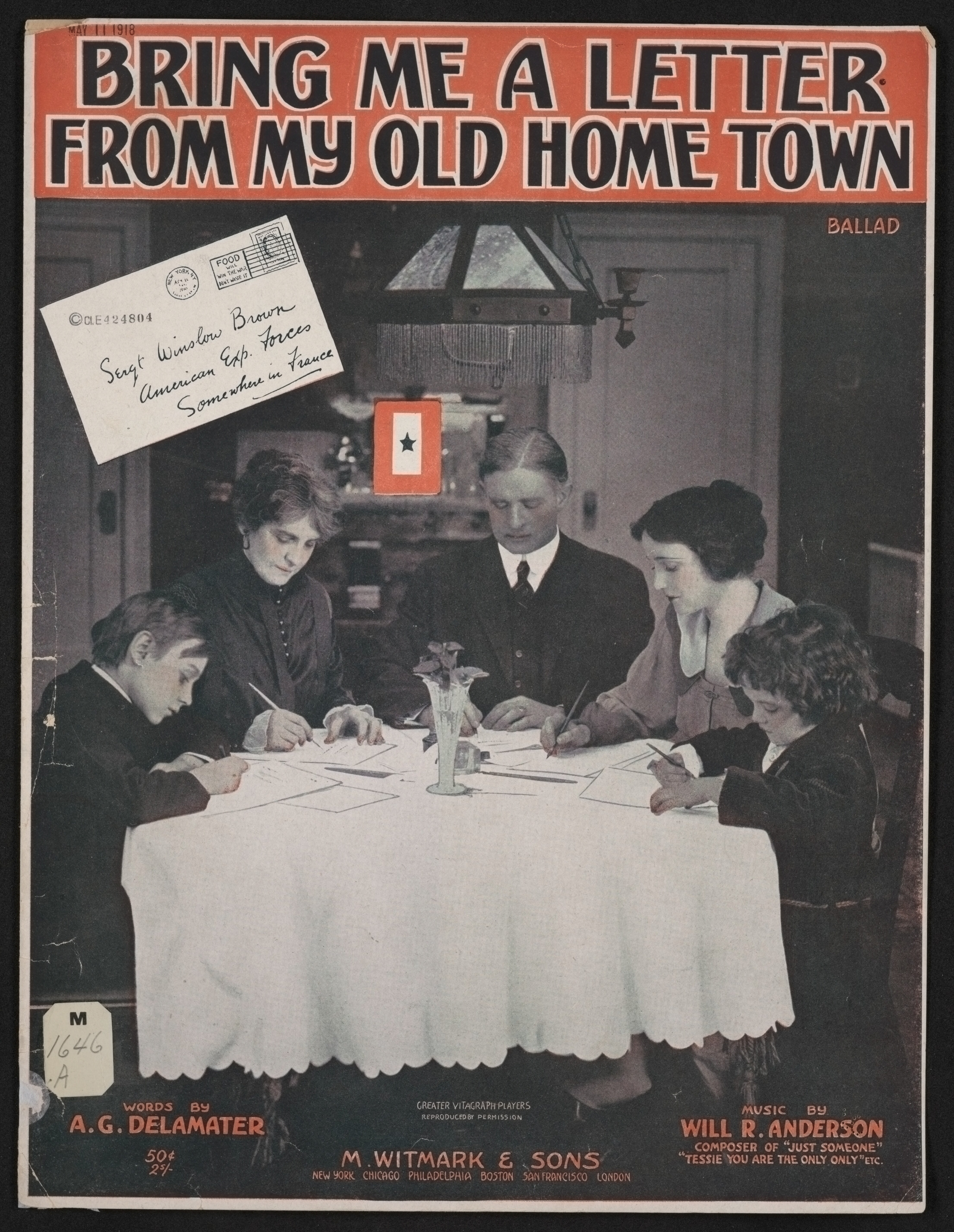

Song
- Published: 1918 by M. Witmark & Sons
- Genre: War-time song
- Composer(s): Will R. Anderson
- Lyricist(s): A.G. Delamater

"Bring Me a Letter from My Old Home Town" is a World War I era ballad song released in 1918. A.G. Delamater wrote the lyrics and Will R. Anderson composed the music. It was written for both voice and piano.

The song was published by M. Witmark & Sons in New York City. On the sheet music cover is a group of "greater Vitagraph players" sitting around a table, writing letters. Behind them is a service flag with a red border and one blue star.

The song opens with a wounded soldier laying on a cot. He tells a nurse that the only thing that will cure his homesickness is hearing from his "old home town". The chorus is as follows:

Bring me a letter from my old home town,
One with jokes from my old pal, Jim Brown.
Bring me a letter from that girl of mine,
Saying that she's longing for me all the time
Bring me a letter from my proud old dad,
Who knows that we are winning, and I'll bet he's glad.
But more than any other,
A line from my old mother;
Bring me a letter from my home town.

== Sheet music ==
The sheet music can be found at Pritzker Military Museum & Library.

== Performers ==
The song was performed by Billy Jones for Edison Blue Amberol and by Will R. Anderson for Columbia.
