= Broadway Licensing =

Broadway Licensing Global
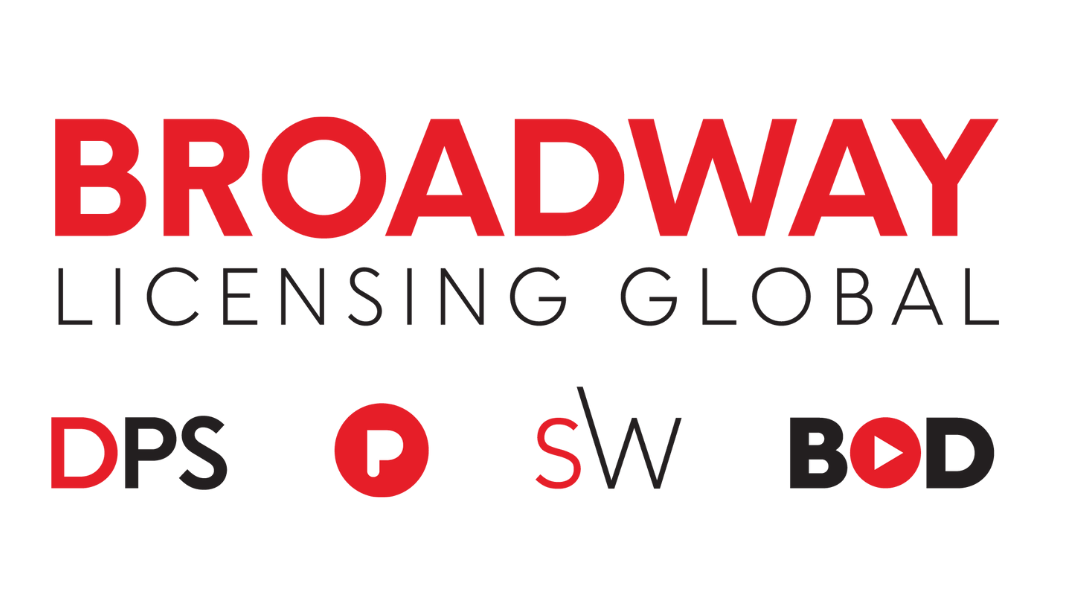
- Industry: Entertainment
- Founded: 2017; 9 years ago
- Headquarters: 250 West 57th Street, 6th Floor, New York NY 10107
- Website: www.concordtheatricals.com

Broadway Licensing Global is a theatrical licensing agency and publisher based in New York City, founded in 2017 by Sean Cercone. In 2023 the company rebranded from Broadway Licensing Group to Broadway Licensing Global to reflect its international growth.

Broadway Licensing Global and its imprints currently have over 8,000 plays and musicals available for professional and non-professional licensing. Playwrights include Arthur Miller, Lynn Nottage, Tom Stoppard, John Leguizamo, and more. Recently acquired titles Jaja's African Hair Braiding by Jocelyn Bioh, Oh, Mary! by Cole Escola, Harry Potter and the Cursed Child, based on an original story by J. K. Rowling, John Tiffany and Jack Thorne.

== History ==
Broadway Licensing was established in 2017 by Rebel Rebel Capital, which had previously acquired Playscripts, Inc. in 2014. Cercone was named president, and purchased Broadway Licensing, as well as Playscripts, two years later in 2019, with the company rebranding as the Broadway Licensing Group (BLG).

In 2021, BLG acquired Dramatists Play Service, and in 2022, BLG acquired Roger Bean's Stage Rights.

In 2023, the company rebranded as Broadway Licensing Global to reflect its international growth.

On March 1st, 2024 the company announced that Cercone would be stepping down as CEO.

On May 8, 2025, Variety announced that Broadway Licensing had been acquired by Concord and is now a part of Concord Theatricals.
