= Carrie De Mar =

American actress (1876–1963)

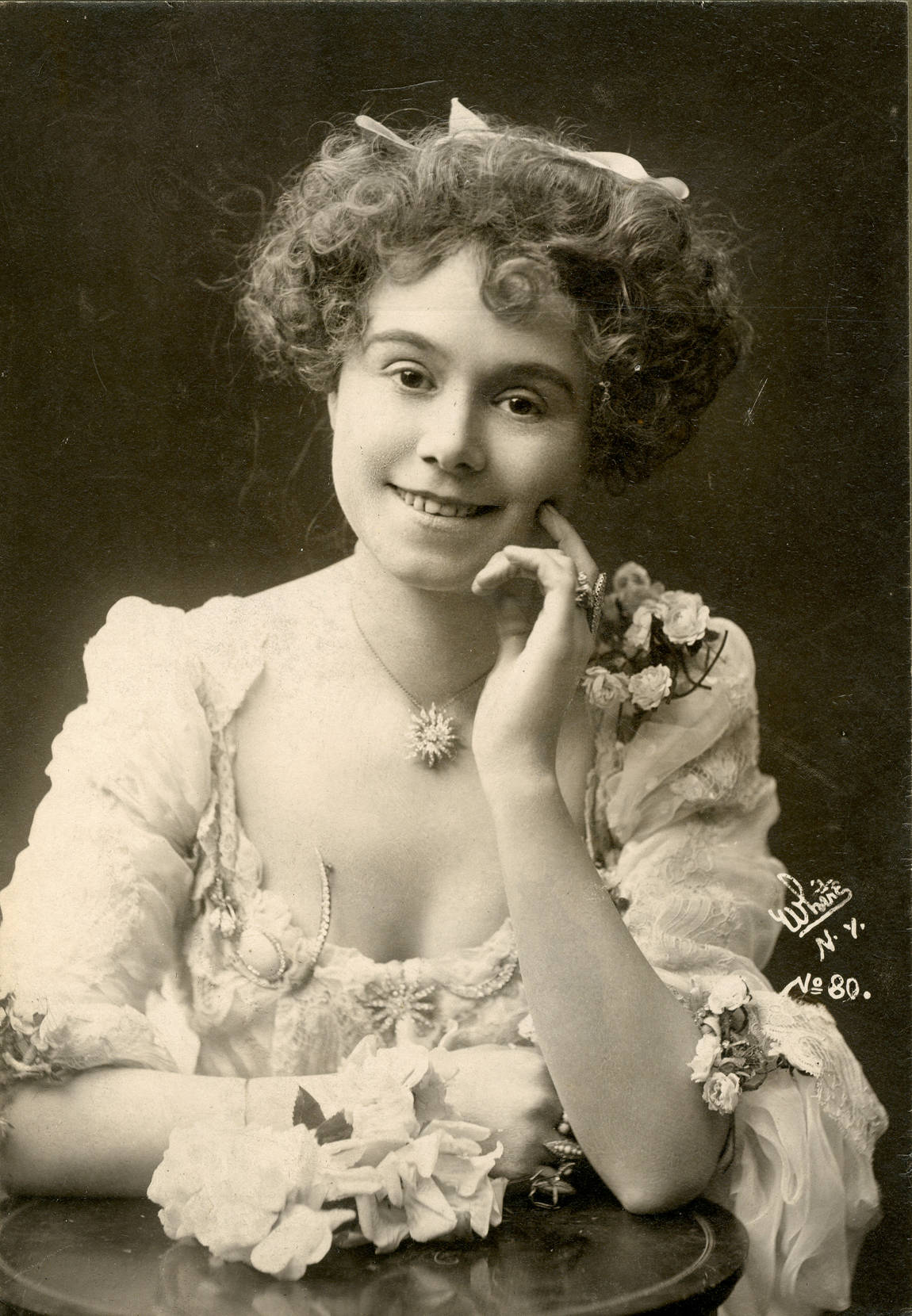
- Born: April 1, 1876; Scranton, Pennsylvania
- Died: February 23, 1963 (aged 86); Cold Spring, New York
- Other names: Mrs. Joseph Hart; Carrie DeMar
- Occupation: Actress
- Spouse: Joseph Hart

Carrie De Mar (April 1, 1876 - February 23, 1963) was an American actress and singer. She appeared often with her husband Joseph Hart in both the legitimate theatre and vaudeville; notably co-starring in the Broadway musical Foxy Grandpa (1902). The popularity of this show spawned several early short silent films released in 1902 starring De Mar and Hart known collectively as the Foxy Grandpa series. De Mar starred in two more Broadway musicals, Seeing New York (1906) and The Land of Nod and The Song Birds (1907), with Hart serving as either a contributing playwright or songwriter. In 1910s she performed in vaudeville as an impersonator who used rapid costume changes to evolve into a succession of changing characters. Joe Hart died in 1921 and Carrie died in 1963.

== Life and career ==
Carrie De Mar was born in Scranton, Pennsylvania on April 1, 1876. She began her career at the Chicago Opera House in the theater company of impresario David Henderson. By 1893 she had joined the theatre troupe of Frederick Hallen and Joseph Hart as a starring player in their comedy of errors, The Idea. The company's tour that year ranged from Atlantic City, New Jersey to Salt Lake City, Utah. She married Hart on August 1, 1894. She toured with Hallen & Hart in the 1894-1895 season in the show Later On with the company announcing in February 1895 it would disband at the end of the season.

Hart established his own company with De Mar as his leading actress; opening the 1896-1897 season at the Academy of Music in Jersey City, New Jersey with Carrie portraying Vangie Varney in the show A Gay Old Boy. This show subsequently toured to Massachusetts. After this, De Mar and Hart went into vaudeville together in the B. F. Keith Circuit in New York City and Philadelphia in early 1898; performing in a sketch called The Quiet, Mr. Gay. This was followed by further performances at Shea's Garden Theatre in Buffalo, New York in what the Buffalo Courier Express described as a song and dance act that was "well varnished" and "passed the time" but dismissed as having "amounted to nothing".

In the 1899-1900 season De Mar and her husband gave performances at the Star Theater in Cleveland, Ohio the old Creighton Orpheum Theater (not the current venue) in Omaha, Nebraska, the Orpheum Theatre in San Francisco, and the Orpheum Theatre in Los Angeles. In September 1900 they were engaged at Proctor's Theatre in Manhattan. By January 1901 they were in Scranton, Pennsylvania performing the sketch "Gay Mr. Quick" at the Lyceum Theater. Later that month they introduced a new sketch, "A Close Call", at the Brooklyn Music Hall.

In 1902 De Mar portrayed Polly Bright to Hart's Goodelby Goodman in the Broadway musical Foxy Grandpa at Haverly's 14th Street Theatre. Her sister, the actress Fleurette De Mar, was also in this show in the role of Dorothy Goodman. The popularity of this musical led to the creation of a series of ten short silent films released in 1902 starring De Mar and her husband; among them The Creators of Foxy Grandpa, Foxy Grandpa Shows Boys He is a Magician, Foxy Grandpa and Polly in a Little Hilarity, and Boys Take Grandpa's Cigars with Distressing Results to name just a few. She later returned to Broadway in A. Baldwin Sloane's Seeing New York (1906, with Hart as playwright) and Joseph E. Howard's The Land of Nod and The Song Birds (1907, with Hart as a contributing songwriter).

De Mar continued to work in vaudeville America and Canada in the 1910s as a popular singer and impersonator. In 1912 she went to England where she played at the London Coliseum. She became known for her rapid costume changes which transformed her into a series of rotating characters. According to historian Marlis Schweitzer, "De Mar's act called attention to fashion's potential for disguise and transformation, showing how boundaries of class, age, race, and gender might be dissolved by adopting a new look." Critics of Del Mar felt her comedy of varied caricatures could be too broad, but other noted her popularity with women because of her use of clothes.

In 1921 Carrie's husband, Joseph, died. She died more than 40 years later of a stroke in Cold Spring, New York on February 23, 1963.
