= Tams-Witmark Music Library =

Tams-Witmark Musical Library, Inc.
- Company type: Private
- Genre: Licensing organization
- Founded: New York City, United States (1925)
- Headquarters: New York, NY.
- Parent: Concord Music
- Website: https://www.concordtheatricals.com/collections/perform/1706

Tams-Witmark is an American company that provides professional and amateur theaters license to Broadway musical scripts and scores. Among the many notable properties handled by the company are Kiss Me, Kate; My Fair Lady; Gypsy; Bye Bye Birdie; Hello, Dolly!; Cabaret; Man of La Mancha and A Chorus Line. The company has also acquired numerous properties often inspired by or based upon motion pictures or comic strips, such as 42nd Street, The Wizard of Oz, Meet Me In St. Louis, You're a Good Man, Charlie Brown, and Li'l Abner. The company has also prepared for licensing simpler, shorter derivative works for performance by elementary and middle school students, such as an abbreviated version of Bye, Bye Birdie.

== History ==
In 1922, Sargent Aborn (1867–1956), brother of Milton Aborn (1864–1933), both of the Aborn Opera Company, acquired the Arthur W. Tams (1848–1927) music library, a collection that had become the largest circulating music library in the world — and by extension, Witmark's biggest competitor in the music-rental field. In January 1925, the company was formed as a merger of the Arthur W. Tams Music Library (1870) and the M. Witmark & Sons Music Library, ending 30 years of intense rivalry. The combined company, operating as the Tam-Witmark Music Library Inc. (a New York corporation) secured its position as the largest source of musical-comedy and operatic music for amateur and professional productions.

At the time of the merger, the company managed the works of such notable composers as John Philip Sousa, Franz Lehár and Victor Herbert. Shortly after consolidation, it also began to manage music by George and Ira Gershwin, Cole Porter, Jerome Kern, Guy Bolton and P.G. Wodehouse. It added to its collection during those early years two of its most popular works, Anything Goes and Girl Crazy, on which was based the musical Crazy for You. The company has continued to expand its collection with many notable and award-winning musicals, including more recently The Will Rogers Follies, Titanic and City of Angels.

It was announced that Tams-Witmark now holds the licensing to "Lysistrata Jones".

Sargent Aborn was president of Tams-Witmark from its founding until his death in 1957. In 1942, Sargent Aborn and his son, Louis Henry Aborn (1912–2005), acquired the rights to the Tams Library. As of 2014, the co-chairmen were Robert Aborn Hut (born 1935) and Sargent Louis Aborn (born 1948) and the executive vice-president was Peter Aborn Hut (born 1940). All three are grandchildren of Sargent Aborn. In January 2022, Sargent Louis Aborn retired as the company's CEO, a role he served in for over 40 years.

Tams-Witmark was acquired by Concord Bicycle Music in early 2018.
