= Break the News to Mother =

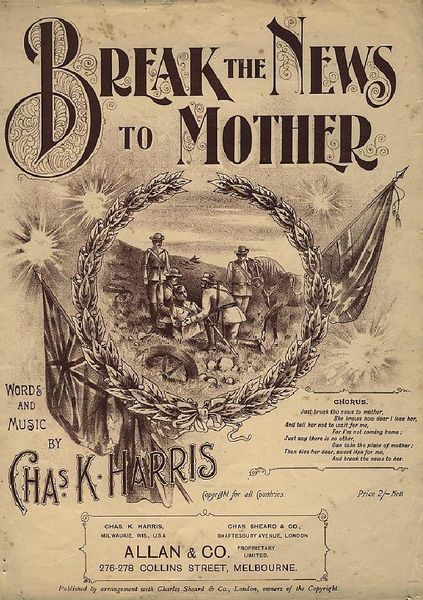

Song
- Released: 1897
- Songwriter: Charles K. Harris

"Break the News to Mother" is a war song first released in 1897. The song was popular during the Spanish–American War, and re-released during World War I. It is sometimes erroneously believed to be an American Civil War song. Charles "Chas" K. Harris wrote the lyrics and composed the music. The song was originally published by Harris in New York, New York.

Originally Harris wrote the song about a fireman. After the USS Maine explosion in Havana Harbor in 1898, Harris rewrote it with a soldier in place of a fireman.

The song tells the story of a young soldier who is fatally shot while saving his company's fallen flag. The General, who initially praises the soldier for his brave deed, realizes he is, in fact, his own son. The chorus is the soldier's dying wishes, and is as follows:

"Just break the news to mother,
she knows how dear I love her
And tell her not to wait for me
For, I'm not coming home;
Just say there is no other
can take the place of mother
Then kiss her dear,
sweet lips for me,
and break the news to her."

The sheet music can be found at Pritzker Military Museum & Library.

== 1897 version ==
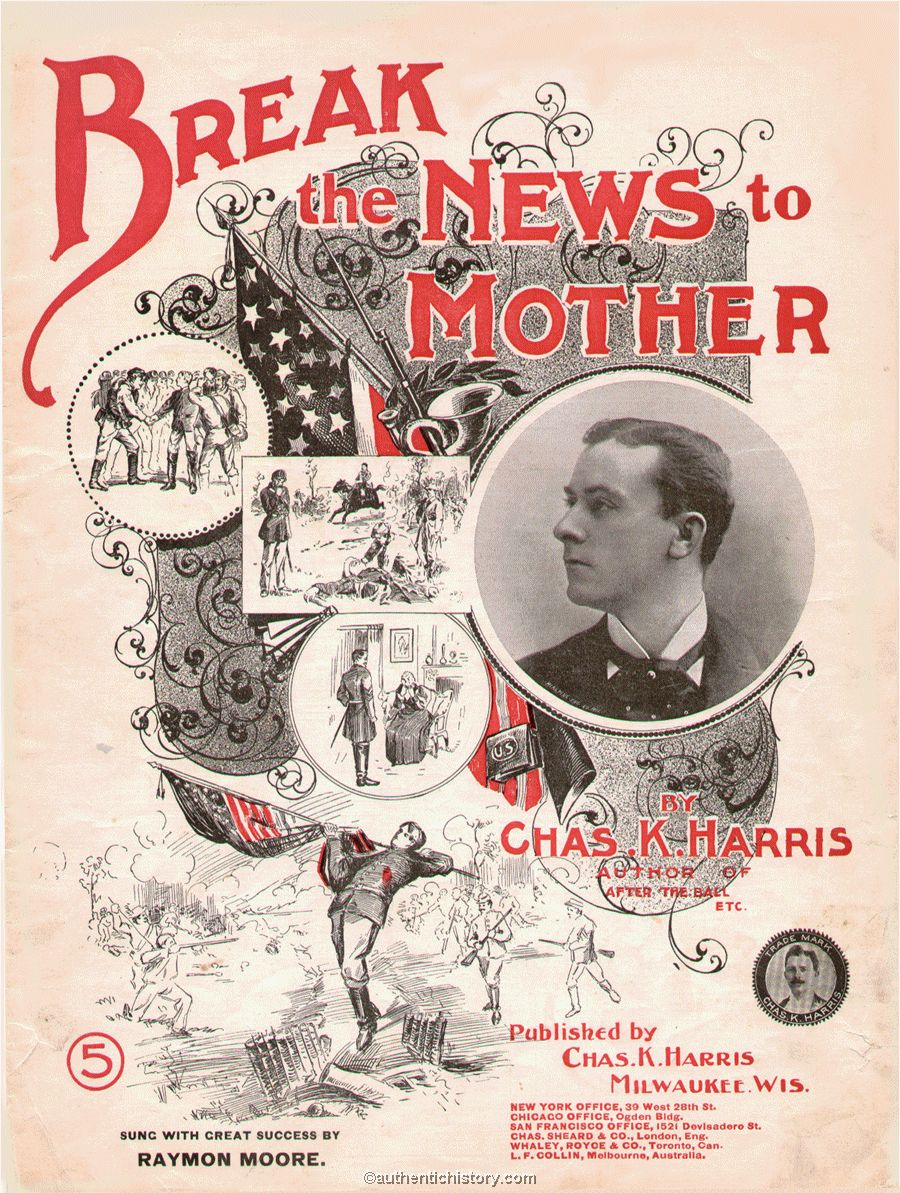
1897 cover of "Break the News to Mother"

The cover of the 1897 version features three different drawings: one depicts soldiers entering the war; the next shows a fallen soldier; the final is that of a soldier telling a distraught woman the news. Also on the bottom of the cover is a drawing of the battle scene in which the soldier saving the flag, is shot. The American flag is in the background. Along with the drawings, the cover also features a picture on the right-hand side, which varies version to version. One cover has a photograph of a couple. Another version has a photograph of Attie Spence. A man's profile is featured in another cover.

This version was arranged by Joseph Clauder.

== 1916 version ==
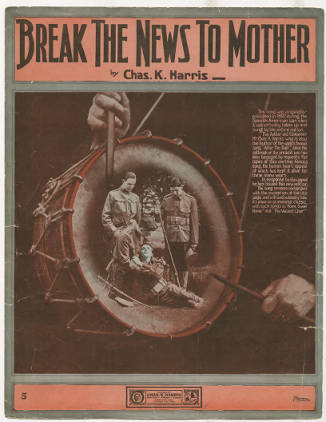
1917 Sheet music cover of "Break the News to Mother"

The 1916 sheet music cover features a picture of a group of soldiers aiding a fallen soldier. The photo is framed inside of a snare drum. The cover was designed by the Starmer Brothers. It was written for both voice and piano.

== 1917 version ==
The vocal group, Shannon Four, recorded a version of Break the News to Mother in Camden, New Jersey on July 31, 1917. It was published by Victor Records.

== Recordings ==
It was recorded by J. W. Meyer in 1904, by Henry Burr, and the Shannon Four in 1917.
