= Dramatists Play Service =

American publisher of plays

Dramatists Play Service, Inc.
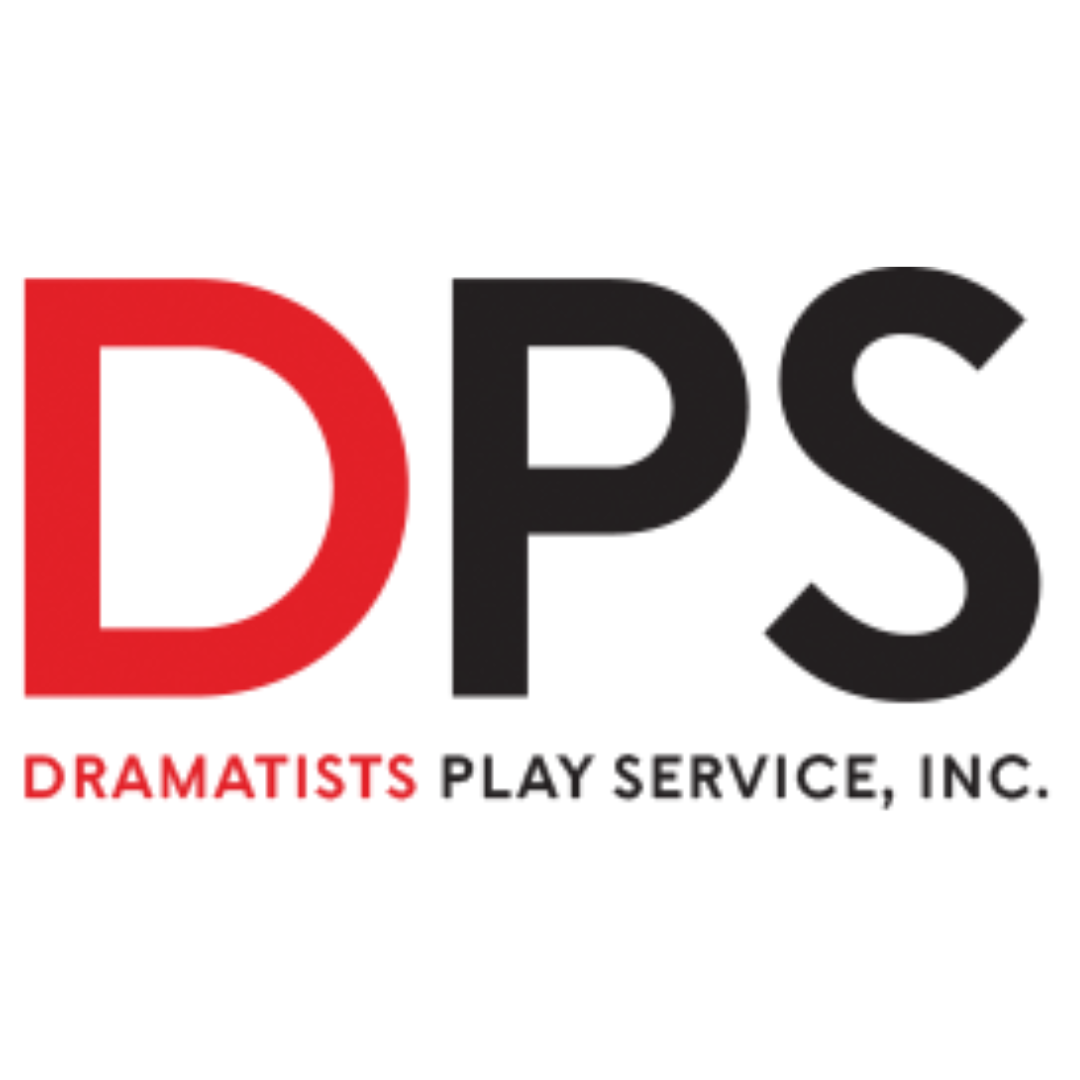
- Parent company: Broadway Licensing
- Founded: 1936
- Founder: Dramatists Guild of America and the Society for Authors' Representatives
- Country of origin: United States
- Headquarters location: New York City
- Publication types: Acting Editions
- Official website: www.concordtheatricals.com

Dramatists Play Service, Inc. is a theatrical-publishing and licensing house imprint of Broadway Licensing Global. Established in 1936 by members of the Dramatists Guild of America and the Society for Authors' Representatives, DPS publishes English-language acting editions of plays and handles the licensing for professional and nonprofessional English-language productions of these plays in the United States, Canada, and throughout the world.

DPS is based in New York City, with affiliates in London, Australia, South Africa, India, Asia, and South America that serve DPS' interests in their respective regions. The DPS catalogue consists of over 3,300 titles from over 1,300 authors.

Broadway Licensing Global acquired Dramatists Play Service in 2021, adding to its family of imprints which also includes Playscripts and Stageworks. On May 8, 2025, Variety announced that Broadway Licensing had been acquired by Concord and is now a part of Concord Theatricals.
