= Bicycle Music Company =

Music publishing company

Bicycle Music
- Company type: Private
- Industry: Music publishing
- Founded: 1974
- Successor: Concord
- Headquarters: Los Angeles, California, New York, Nashville, Tennessee, London, United Kingdom, Berlin, Germany, Miami, Florida,
- Owner: Woodcreek Capital
- Number of employees: 24
- Website: www.bicyclemusic.com

The Bicycle Music Company was a music publishing company founded independently, and after growing for a number of years was merged with Concord Music Group in 2015. As of 2010, it owned or administered over 12,000 works from songwriters.

== Early history ==
The Bicycle Music Company was founded in 1974 by music publishing executive David Rosner, veteran of the CBS publishing division April/Blackwood Music and longtime publishing representative to singer-songwriter Neil Diamond. One of the company's early international hits was “Let Your Love Flow,” written by Neil Diamond's guitar technician, Larry E. Williams. Later, Rosner's son, Jonathan, joined Bicycle Music and expanded the company's contemporary writer relationships.

In 2005, Rosner sold Bicycle Music to Clear Channel Entertainment and the latter's newly formed music rights acquisition company Sound Investors, LLC, owned by Clear Channel Entertainment executive Stephen Smith. Concord's Chief Publishing Executive, Jake Wisely, joined the management team at the closing of the acquisition. By the end of that year, following Clear Channel's decision to divest significant entertainment assets and spin off the balance of its holdings into a separately traded public company called Live Nation, Smith became the company's sole owner.

A year later, Sound Investors contributed its interest in Bicycle to a new rights management partnership with Wood Creek Capital Management. By this time, Bicycle oversaw the publishing concerns of a catalog including Marvin Hamlisch, Glen Ballard (recorded by Michael Jackson and Alanis Morissette), and many others.

By 2010, Bicycle Music had purchased additional song catalogs including artists Cyndi Lauper, Tammy Wynette, Ozomatli, Marshall Goodman (co-wrote for Sublime and Long Beach Dub All-Stars), Dwight Yoakam, Montell Jordan, and more. in April 2010, Bicycle acquired part of the TVT Records catalogue, including Pretty Hate Machine by Nine Inch Nails.

In October 2013, The Bicycle Music Company acquired the catalogue of Wind-Up Records and partnered with Concord Music Group to distribute the catalogue. Concord and Bicycle merged in April 2015, and Concord acquired the rest of Wind-Up in May 2015.

== Concord Bicycle Music ==
Bicycle Music had completed over 100 publishing and master recording catalog deals by 2015. That year, the Bicycle Music Company was merged with Concord Music Group to form the fully-integrated global music company called Concord Bicycle Music.
