= Foxy Grandpa =

American comic strip by Carl Schultze

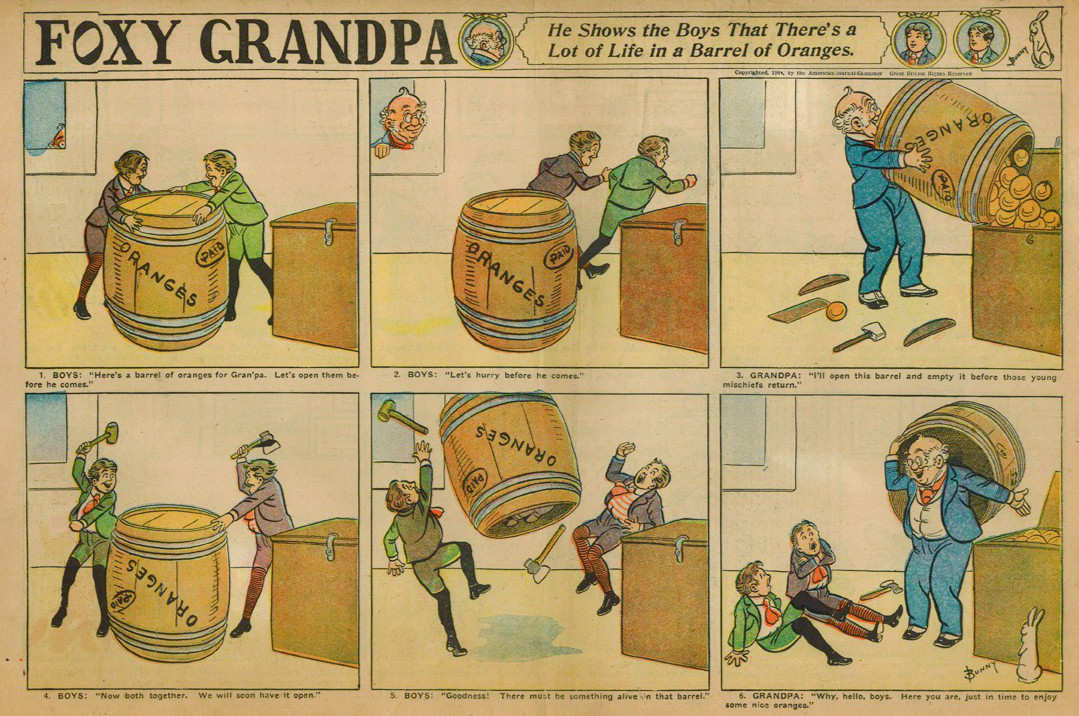
- Carl E. Schultze's Foxy Grandpa (1904)
- Author: Bunny (Carl E. Schultze)
- Current status/schedule: Concluded gag-a-day strip
- Launch date: January 7, 1900
- End date: 1918
- Alternate name: Foxy Grandpa's Stories (1920s–1930s)
- Syndicate(s): New York Herald (1900–1902); New York American (1902–c. 1918); C. J. Mar Syndicate (1912–1918); Newspaper Feature Syndicate (1920s–1930s); Associated Newspapers; New York Press; New York Herald; Philadelphia Bulletin
- Genre: Humor

Foxy Grandpa was an American gag-a-day newspaper comic strip featuring an eponymous character, created by cartoonist Carl E. Schultze drawing under the name of "Bunny." The strip lasted from 1900 to circa 1918, and was at first hugely popular, with stage and silent film adaptations, as well as a party game license. Between 1901 and 1917, Foxy Grandpa was published in books — more than 30 volumes from four different publishers. It was revived as a typeset strip in the 1920s and 1930s.

== Publication history ==
Foxy Grandpa made its first appearance on January 7, 1900. The strip initially ran in the New York Herald, but it moved to the New York American on February 16, 1902. The strip was distributed by the C. J. Mar Syndicate from 1912 to 1918.

The typeset Foxy Grandpa's Stories, distributed by International Features Service, Inc., began April 2, 1923. Foxy Grandpa was the narrator, appearing in a one-panel cartoon at the top of each column. This feature lasted well into the 1930s.

In 1929, the strip appeared in the early comic book The Funnies.

== Characters and story ==
The strip revolved around Foxy Grandpa, an elderly gentleman, with two mischievous grandsons (Chub and Bunt) who constantly try to trick him. Foxy Grandpa, however, always managed to get the better of the two boys, combining brains with a perverse sense of humor, while demonstrating skills at acrobatics, illustration and construction of various small devices.

The comic was drawn in text comic style, with the text and dialogue written underneath the images.

== In other media ==
The strip was adapted to Broadway shows and early silent films (with Foxy Grandpa played by stage performer Joseph Hart). Selchow and Righter licensed Foxy Grandpa for the Foxy Grandpa Hat Party Game (similar to Pin the Tail on the Donkey) after 1900.

The included silent films:

- Foxy Grandpa and Polly in a Little Hilarity (Copyright American Mutoscope & Biograph Co. 23 May 1902. H18034)
- Foxy Grandpa Shows the Boys a Trick or Two with the Tramp (Copyright American Mutoscope & Biograph Co. 23 May 1902. H18033)
- Foxy Grandpa Tells the Boys a Funny Story (Copyright American Mutoscope & Biograph Co. 23 May 1902. H18039)
- Foxy Grandpa Thumb Book (Copyright American Mutoscope & Biograph Co. 19 Oct 1903. H36862)

In April 1923, a Foxy Grandpa radio program began broadcasting over WCAE, Pittsburgh, PA.

== In popular culture ==
- In the 1938 film Crashing Hollywood the squirrelly movie mogul Hugo Wells is called "Foxy Grandpa".
- In the 1944 film Murder, My Sweet detective Philip Marlowe refers to the villainous Jules Amthor as "Foxy Grandpa".
- In the Pogo strip for Sunday, April 8, 1951, Rackety Coon Chile and Alabaster Alligator are less than thrilled with a story being told to them by Albert and wonder if they might be able to move to another strip. Alabaster suggests "Foxey [sic] Grandpa".
- In the 2002 SpongeBob SquarePants episode "One Krabs Trash," "Foxy Grandpa" is written on a trucker hat offered to SpongeBob SquarePants by his boss, Mr. Krabs.
