= Concord Music Group =

American independent music company

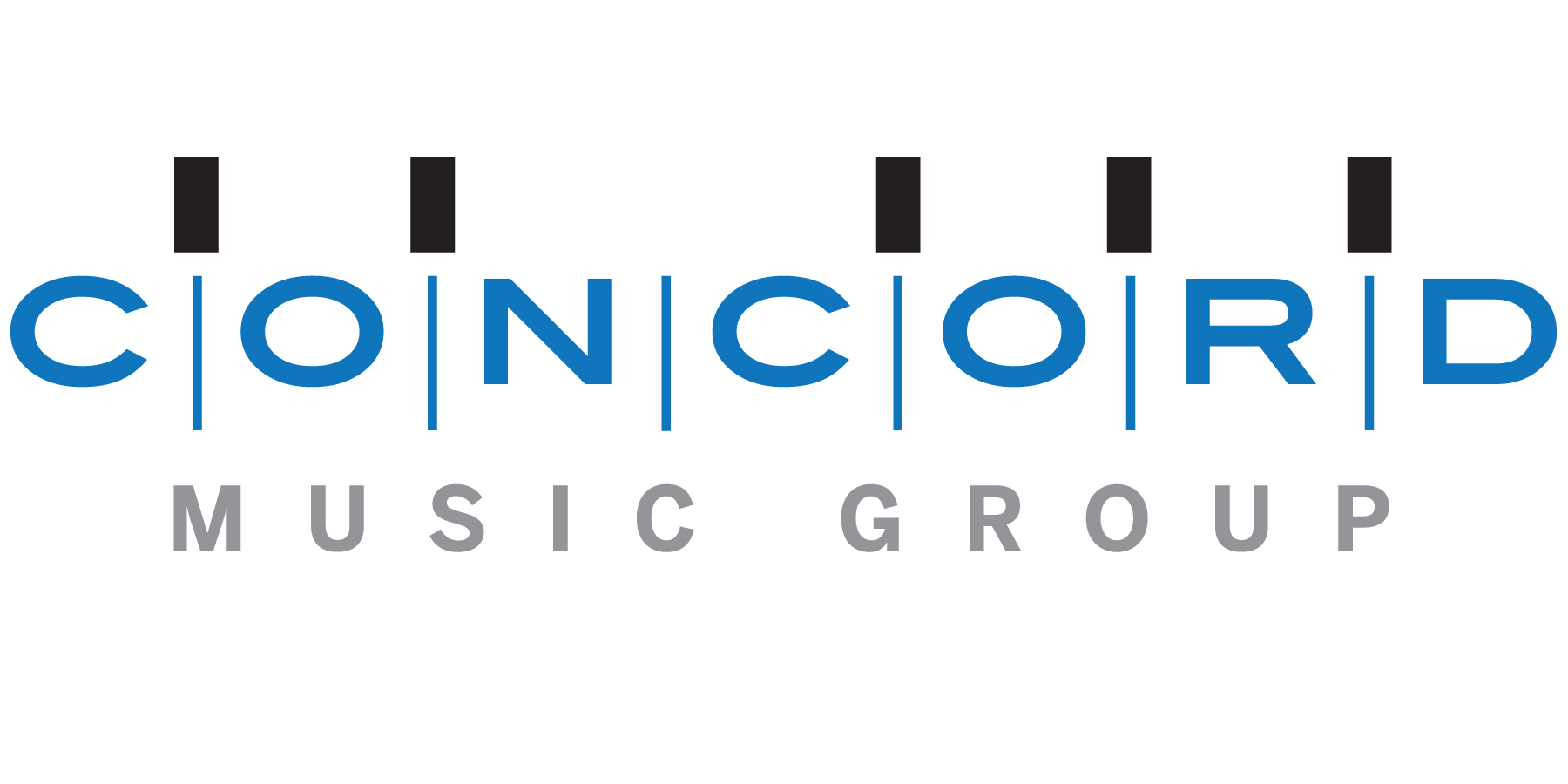
- Type: Private
- Industry: Music
- Predecessor: Concord Records (1973–2004)
- Founded: 2004; 22 years ago
- Defunct: April 1, 2015; 11 years ago
- Successor: Concord (2015–2026); BMG (2026–present)
- Headquarters: Beverly Hills, California, U.S.
- Key people: Glen Barros (CEO)
- Website: concord.com

Concord Music Group was an American independent music company based in Beverly Hills, California, with worldwide distribution (including the U.S.) through Universal Music Group. The company specialized in recordings and music publishing. On April 1, 2015, Concord Music Group merged with Bicycle Music Company to become Concord Bicycle Music.

== History ==
In 2004, Concord Records acquired Fantasy, Inc., owner of the Prestige, Fantasy, Milestone, Riverside, Specialty, and the post-Atlantic Stax catalog. Concord then combined with Fantasy to form the independent Concord Music Group (CMG). Also in 2004, CMG partnered with Starbucks to release the Ray Charles album Genius Loves Company, which won eight GRAMMY Awards, including Album of the Year. In 2005, CMG bought Telarc. On December 18, 2006, CMG announced the re-launch of the soul label Stax; rights to the name were formerly held by Fantasy. New singers included Isaac Hayes and Angie Stone.

In March 2007, Concord Music Group and Starbucks jointly founded the Hear Music label. Paul McCartney's album Memory Almost Full was released in June 2007. Hear Music went on to release albums by Joni Mitchell, James Taylor, Alanis Morissette, Carly Simon and John Mellencamp.

The next year, Village Roadshow Pictures Group (VRPG) and CMG completed their merger resulting in the creation of the new diversified entertainment group, Village Roadshow Entertainment Group. In April 2010 it was announced that Paul McCartney transferred the distribution rights of his post-Beatles output to Concord from EMI.

CMG purchased Rounder Records in 2010. In 2012, Concord Music Group designated four distinct operating units: Fantasy Label Group (Hear Music, Stax, Fantasy), Rounder Label Group, Concord-Telarc Label Group (Concord Jazz/Heads-Up/Telarc) and Prestige Group.

Esperanza Spalding was honored with the Best New Artist GRAMMY in 2011, a first for Concord Records. CMG artists won 8 GRAMMY Awards at the 2013 Awards ceremony, the most of any label group.

Wood Creek Capital Management, (now Barings LLC, an affiliate of MassMutual Financial Group), purchased Concord Music Group from Village Roadshow Entertainment Group in March 2013. On October 31, 2013, music publisher The Bicycle Music Company acquired Wind-up Records back catalog including the master recordings of 1,600 songs including albums by Creed, Evanescence, Seether and Alter Bridge. The Bicycle Music Company then entered into a service agreement deal with sister company Concord Music Group to market the acquired Wind-up Records and other back catalogs to retailers and consumers.

On July 1, 2014, Tom Whalley's label, Loma Vista Recordings (home to St. Vincent, Little Dragon, Spoon, Cut Copy, Marilyn Manson, Ghost, and the GRAMMY-nominated Django Unchained soundtrack, among others) agreed to a new multi-year, worldwide strategic partnership with Concord Music Group. Under the terms of the agreement, CMG provided funding for new talent relationships and artist development, as well as comprehensive label services for Loma Vista. On July 8, 2014, Concord Music Group announced the acquisition of the Vee-Jay Records catalog including over 5,000 master recordings from Little Richard, John Lee Hooker, Betty Everett, Jimmy Reed, Jerry Butler, The Staple Singers, Gene Chandler and the Dells, among many others.

Concord Music Group merged with the Bicycle Music Company, a leading independent music publisher, record label and rights manager in April 2015 to form the fully integrated recorded music and publishing company Concord Bicycle Music. Concord Music and Bicycle Music operated as individual divisions within Concord Bicycle Music (CBM), with Concord Music Group being primarily responsible for recorded music activities and Bicycle overseeing publishing and rights management. CBM then immediately announced that it had acquired Vanguard Records and Sugar Hill Records from the Welk Music Group.

On 28 April 2026, BMG Rights Management and Concord announced that they would merge, operating under the BMG name. The combined company will call its publishing division BMG Publishing and its recorded music division Concord Records. On June 12, 2026, the merger was approved by the German Federal Cartel Office. On June 17, 2026, the merger was approved by the US competition authorities and the merger was completed on September 1, 2026.
