= Carl E. Schultze =

American cartoonist (1866-1939)

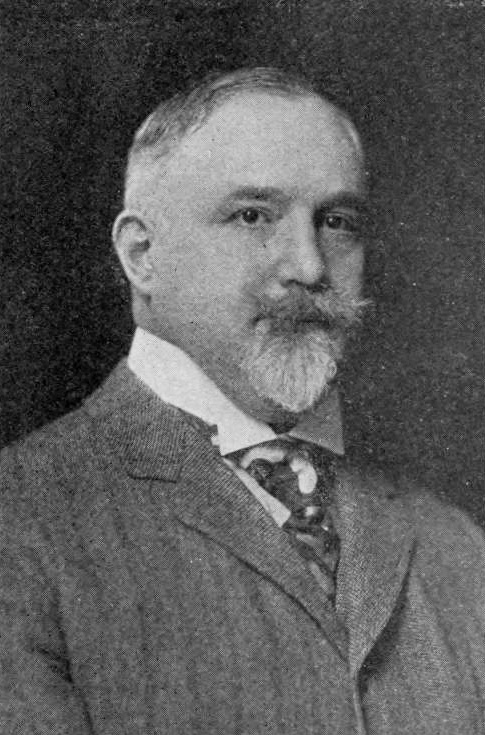
- Born: Carl Emil Schultze; May 25, 1866 Lexington, Kentucky, U.S.
- Died: January 18, 1939 (aged 72) New York City, U.S.
- Area: Cartoonist
- Pseudonym: Bunny
- Notable works: Foxy Grandpa

Carl Emil Schultze (May 25, 1866 – January 18, 1939) was an American cartoonist best known for his popular Foxy Grandpa comic strip series. He drew the strip under the pseudonym Bunny, his childhood nickname. The Bunny signature was usually accompanied by a drawing of a rabbit.

== Early life and education ==
Born in Lexington, Kentucky, Schultze was educated at Lexington and in Cassel, Germany. In Ripley, Ohio, he joined up with a group of traveling actors for a brief period. He sold his first drawing in Chicago for four dollars and soon was drawing regularly for the Chicago News during the late 1880s.

== Foxy Grandpa ==
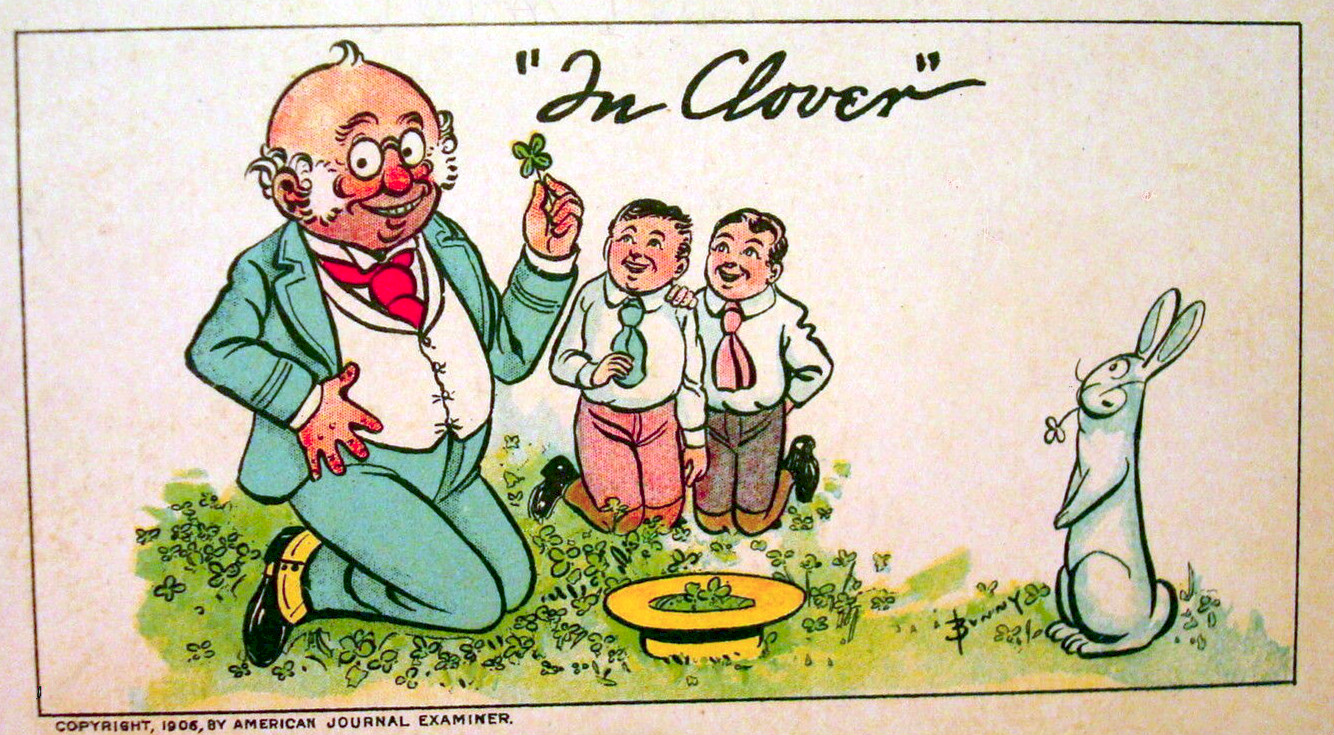
Schultze's Foxy Grampa and his two grandsons, 1906

His Foxy Grandpa comic strip was first published in January 1900 in the New York Herald, moving to the New York American in 1902. In 1907, he was resting at The Homestead in Hot Springs, Virginia where he took the mineral baths for rheumatism.

By 1913, Schultze was president of the Bunny Amusement Corporation of New York. At the peak of his fame with Foxy Grandpa, Schultze lived on Park Avenue. The strip disappeared as a regular feature in 1918.

== Later life ==
In 1919, he traveled about promoting a beverage named Whistle. In 1922, he was leading oceanside physical exercise classes at Miami Beach. Personal problems and debts plagued Schultze through the 1920s. He resurfaced in 1935, illustrating school books, including the popular Julia and the Bear. During the 1930s, he was a Works Progress Administration worker.

In 1935, when Schultze was dependent on the Emergency Work Relief Bureau for his income, he lived in a furnished room at 351 West 20th Street between 8th and 9th Avenues. From there he moved to 360 West 26th Street, where he died of a heart attack in 1939. Headlines at the time of his death read, "Creator of Foxy Grandpa Is Found Dead, a Pauper." On the wall of his room was a picture of Minnie and Mickey Mouse with the inscription, "For Carl E. Schultze, in admiration. Walt Disney."

His only known relative at the time of his death was his sister, Mrs. C. C. Sandersky of Nicholsville, Kentucky.

== Books ==
- Vaudevilles and Other Things (1900)
- The Adventures of Foxy Grandpa (1900)
- The Bunny Book (three volumes)

== Sources ==
- Rines, George Edwin, ed. (1920). "Schultze, Carl Emil" . Encyclopedia Americana.
