= After the Ball (song) =

1891 song written by Charles K. Harris

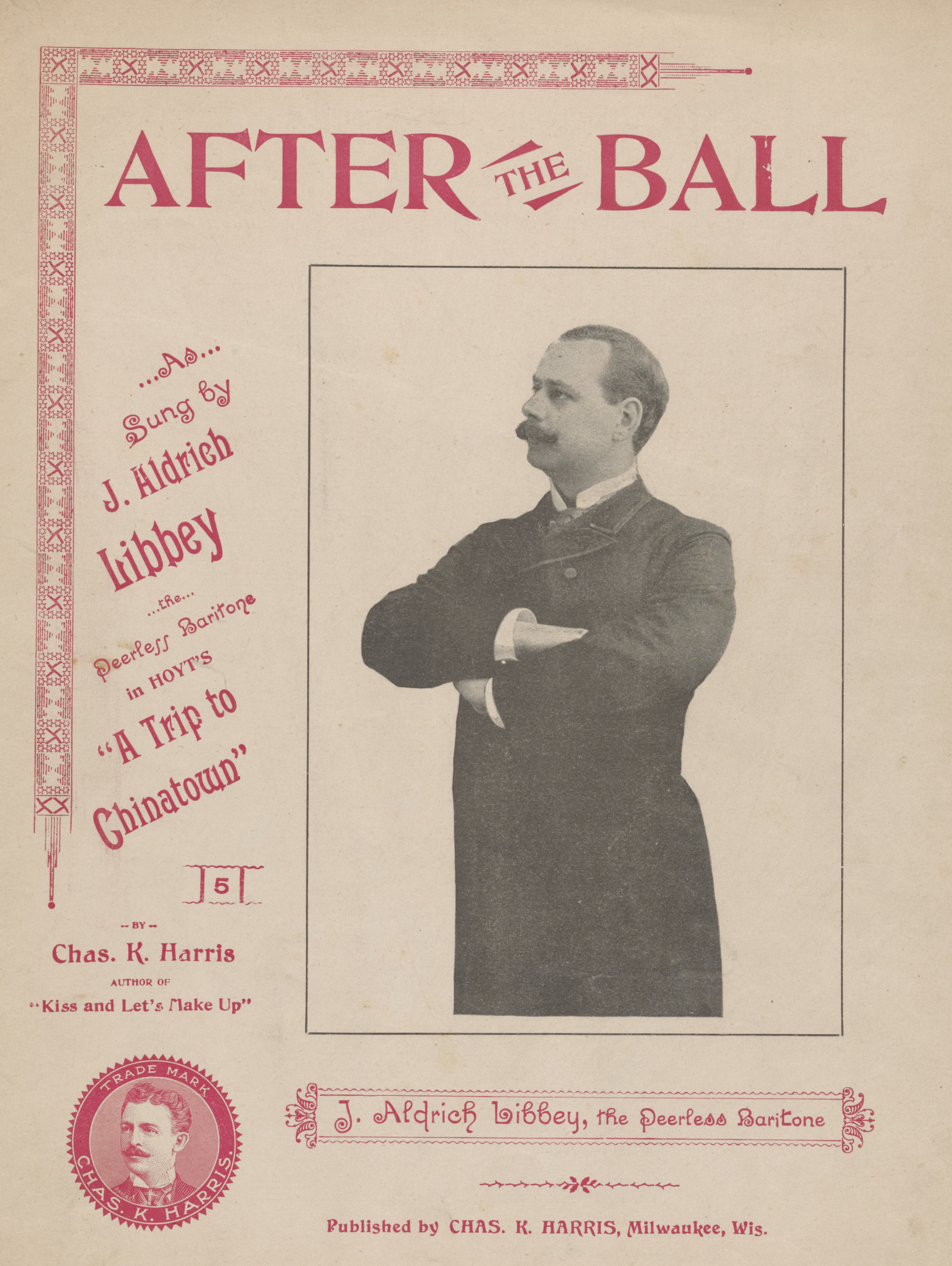
Sheet music cover showing songwriter Charles K. Harris (bottom left) and performer J. Aldrich Libbey (main photo)

Charles K. Harris singing "After the Ball" in the late 1920s.

"After the Ball" is a popular song with music and lyrics by Charles K. Harris. Created in 1891, the song is a classic waltz in 3/4 time. In the song, an uncle tells his niece why he has never married. He saw his sweetheart kissing another man at a ball, and he refused to listen to her explanation. Many years later, after the woman had died, he discovered that the man was her brother.

"After the Ball" became the most successful song of its era, which at that time was gauged by the sales of sheet music. In 1892, it sold over two million copies of sheet music. Its total sheet music sales exceed five million copies, making it the best seller in Tin Pan Alley's history. It exemplifies the sentimental ballads published before 1920, whose topics were frequently babies, separation, and death.

== History ==
The song was originally written for an amateur minstrel show in Milwaukee, Wisconsin. It was not an immediate success, but Harris published it himself and arranged for it to be interpolated into the touring musical production of A Trip to Chinatown, in which it was sung by J. Aldrich Libbey. Its popularity grew when it was performed regularly by John Philip Sousa and his band at the 1893 World's Fair in Chicago. In England, it was promoted by George Lashwood. Successful recordings in 1893 were by George J. Gaskin and by John Yorke AtLee.

The song was later famously used in the musical Show Boat to exemplify the 1890s style of music. There it was performed by Norma Terris. In the 1936 film version of the musical, it was performed by Irene Dunne, and in the 1951 film version, by Kathryn Grayson. Only the first verse and chorus were sung in Show Boat.

It was also sung by Alice Faye in the 1940 biographical musical film, Lillian Russell. The song is also heard in the 1936 movie, San Francisco. In the HBO series Carnivàle, the second episode of the first season is titled "After the Ball is Over", and a fragment is sung at the end of the episode. In the last scene of an episode of Season 10 of Murdoch Mysteries, Dr. Julia Ogden plays the song on a gramophone as she removes for examination the brain of a serial killer on the autopsy table. It was sung by in Driving Miss Daisy by Jessica Tandy.

== Lyrics ==
Verse 1

A little maiden climbed an old man's knee,
Begged for a story—"Do, Uncle, please.
Why are you single; why live alone?
Have you no babies; have you no home?"
"I had a sweetheart years, years ago;
Where she is now pet, you will soon know.
List' to my story, I'll tell it all,
I found her faithless, after the ball."

Refrain

After the ball is over,
After the break of morn—
After the dancers' leaving;
After the stars are gone;
Many a heart is aching,
If you could read them all;
Many the hopes that have vanished,
After the ball.

Verse 2

Bright lights were flashing in the grand ballroom,
Softly the music playing sweet tunes.
There came my sweetheart, my love, my own—
"I wish some water; leave me alone."
When I returned dear there stood a man,
Kissing my sweetheart as lovers can.
Down fell the glass dear, broken, that's all,
Just as my heart was after the ball.

Repeat refrain
Verse 3

Long years have passed child, I've never wed.
True to my lost love though she is dead.
She tried to tell me, tried to explain;
I would not listen, pleadings were vain.
One day a letter came from that man,
He was her brother—the letter ran.
That's why I'm lonely, no home at all;
I broke her heart dear, after the ball.

Repeat refrain

== Parody ==
The popularity of the song made it a natural for contemporary parody. A common version was:

After the ball was over, after the break of morn,
After the dancers' leaving, after the stars are gone;
Many a heart is aching, if you could read them all;
Many the hopes that have vanished, after the ball.

After the ball was over, Bonnie took out her glass eye,
Put her false teeth in the water, hung up her wig to dry;
Placed her false arm on the table, laid her false leg on the chair;
After the party was over, Bonnie was only half there!

Alternative parody verse 2 of above:

After the ball was over, Bonnie took out her glass eye,
Put her false teeth in the basin, corked up a bottle of dye
Put her false leg in the corner, hung up her hair on the wall
And all that was left went to bye byes after the ball.

Alternative parody verse:

After the ball is over, see her take out her glass eye,
Put her false teeth in some water, cork up a bottle of dye,
Hang her false hair in the wardrobe then she takes off her false leg,
Half of my rose on the table, the other half in bed.

Alternative parody verse:

After the ball was over,
Bonnie took out her glass eye,
Put her false teeth in water,
Hung up her wig to dry
Put her peg leg in the corner
Hung her tin ear on the wall
And then what was left
Crawled into bed after the ball

Alternative parody verse:

After the ball was over,
Molly took out her glass eye,
put her false teeth in saltwater
hung up her wig to dry
Put her cork leg in the corner
unscrewed the tin ear from her head.
Then what was left of poor Molly
Went toddling off to bed!

== Selected modern recordings and arrangements ==
- Kathryn Grayson 1951
- Guy Lombardo And His Royal Canadians, 1950
- Lawrence Welk And His Orchestra, 1957
- Bing Crosby included the song in a medley on his album Join Bing and Sing Along , (1959)
- Bob Kames, 1959
- Draaiorgel "De Pruik", 1960
- Nat King Cole on Those Lazy-Hazy-Crazy Days of Summer, 1963
- The Kingsway Strings
- Julie London - for her album Swing Me an Old Song (1959)
- Orkest Frans Kerkhof 1960
- Bob Crewe arranged Crewe 1967, covered by Danny Rivers South Africa, 1967
- The Merrymen, from their album "Colour It Calypso", 1971
- Joan Morris and William Bolcom on their debut album of the same title, 1974
- Anita Harris 1978
- Frances Black with the band Arcady from Ireland, credited as "trad.", 1990
- Dave Davies (of English band The Kinks) on the various artists album, The Beautiful Old, 2013

== See also ==
- List of best-selling sheet music
