= Concord (entertainment company) =

1973–2026 American music company

Alchemy Copyrights, LLC
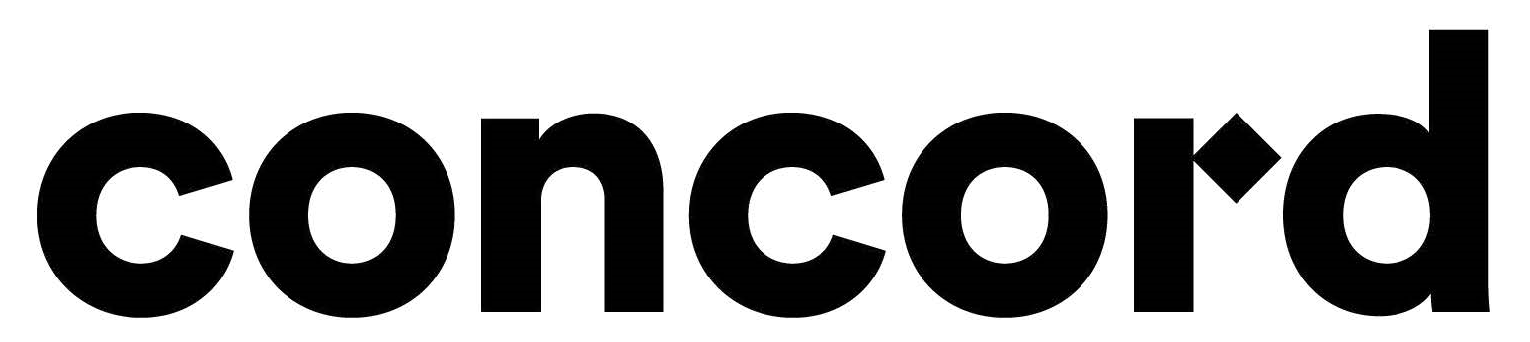
- Trade name: Concord
- Type: Private
- Industry: Record Labels, Music Publishing, Theatrical Licensing and Production, Film and Television
- Predecessor: Concord Jazz (1973–1994); Concord Records (1994–2004); Concord Music Group (2004–2015); Bicycle Music Company (1974–2015); Concord Music (2015–2019)
- Founded: 1973; 53 years ago
- Defunct: September 1, 2026; 59 days ago
- Fate: Merged with BMG
- Headquarters: Nashville, Tennessee
- Key people: John Robert (Bob) Valentine (CEO since 2023); Stephen (Steve) Smith (chairman since 2013); Victor (Vic) Zaraya (COO since 2021); Kent Hoskins (CFO since 2021); Amanda Molter (General Counsel since 2020)
- Revenue: $448 million (2020)
- Owner: State of Michigan Retirement Systems (93%) (Note: Due to being a government entity, SMRS is represented by an independent third-party fiduciary on the board. It has provided external equity funding for Concord's acquisitions.)
- Number of employees: 700
- Divisions: Concord Label Group; Concord Music Publishing; Concord Theatricals; Concord Originals
- Subsidiaries: Boosey & Hawkes; Rodgers and Hammerstein; Kidz Bop; RKO Pictures
- Website: www.concord.com

Concord (incorporated as Alchemy Copyrights LLC) was an independent entertainment company, headquartered in Nashville, Tennessee.

Concord held rights to more than 1.3 million songs, composed works, plays, musicals and active recordings. In 2020, 45% of its revenue came from music, 38% from music publishing and 17% from theatricals. in 2023, according to its CEO, it derived 85% of its revenue "from catalog, rather than newly-developed, music". (Note: Catalog music is defined as older than 18 months.)

On April 2026, Concord announced they would merge with BMG Rights Management, the merger would be completed on September 1st of that same year.

Headquartered in Nashville with additional offices in Los Angeles, New York City, London, Berlin, Melbourne and Miami and staff in Auckland, Sydney, Toronto and Tokyo, Concord's repertoire is licensed in virtually every country and territory worldwide.

== History ==
=== Concord Jazz (1973–1994) ===
Auto dealer and jazz enthusiast Carl Jefferson started the Concord Jazz record label in 1973. He sold the label to Alliance Entertainment in 1994, and Glen Barros was appointed as CEO of the resulting company Concord Records.

=== Concord Records (1994–2004) ===
In 1999, film/television producer Norman Lear and entertainment executive Hal Gaba purchased the company (Concord Jazz and Concord Records) after Alliance filed for bankruptcy. By 2000, the company had begun to receive financial backing from J.P. Morgan & Co.

=== Concord Music Group (2004–2015) ===
Concord Music Group was a Former American independent music company (now Concord) based in Beverly Hills, California, with worldwide (including the U.S.) distribution through Universal Music Group. The company specialized in recordings and music publishing. On April 1, 2015, Concord Music Group merged with Bicycle Music Company to become Concord Bicycle Music.

In 2004, Concord Records acquired Fantasy, Inc., owner of the Prestige, Fantasy, Milestone, Riverside, Specialty, and the post-Atlantic Stax catalog. Concord then combined with Fantasy to form the independent Concord Music Group (CMG). Also in 2004, CMG partnered with Starbucks to release the Ray Charles album Genius Loves Company, which won eight Grammy Awards, including Album of the Year. In 2005, CMG bought Telarc. On December 18, 2006, CMG announced the re-launch of the soul label Stax; rights to the name were formerly held by Fantasy. New singers included Isaac Hayes and Angie Stone.

On March 12, 2007, Concord Music Group and Starbucks jointly founded the Hear Music label. Paul McCartney's album Memory Almost Full was released in June 2007. Hear Music went on to release albums by Joni Mitchell, James Taylor, Alanis Morissette, Carly Simon and John Mellencamp.

In 2008, Village Roadshow Pictures Group (VRPG) and CMG completed their merger resulting in the creation of the new diversified entertainment group, Village Roadshow Entertainment Group. In April 2010, it was announced that Paul McCartney transferred the distribution rights of his post-Beatles output to Concord from EMI.

CMG purchased Rounder Records in 2010. In 2012, Concord Music Group designated four distinct operating units: Fantasy Label Group (Hear Music, Stax, Fantasy), Rounder Label Group, Concord-Telarc Label Group (Concord Jazz/Heads-Up/Telarc) and Prestige Group.

Esperanza Spalding was honored with the Best New Artist Grammy in 2011, a first for Concord Records. CMG artists won 8 Grammy Awards at the 2013 Awards ceremony, the most of any label group.

On March 25, 2013, Wood Creek Capital Management, (now Barings LLC, an affiliate of MassMutual Financial Group), purchased Concord Music Group from Village Roadshow Entertainment Group. On October 31, 2013, music publisher The Bicycle Music Company acquired Wind-up Records back catalog including the master recordings of 1,600 songs including albums by Creed, Evanescence, Seether and Alter Bridge. The Bicycle Music Company then entered into a service agreement deal with sister company Concord Music Group to market the acquired Wind-up Records and other back catalogs to retailers and consumers.

On July 1, 2014, Tom Whalley's label, Loma Vista Recordings (home to St. Vincent, Little Dragon, Spoon, Cut Copy, Marilyn Manson, Ghost, and the Grammy-nominated Django Unchained soundtrack, among others) agreed to a new multi-year, worldwide strategic partnership with Concord Music Group. Under the terms of the agreement, CMG provided funding for new talent relationships and artist development, as well as comprehensive label services for Loma Vista. On July 8, 2014, Concord Music Group announced the acquisition of the Vee-Jay Records catalog including over 5,000 master recordings from Little Richard, John Lee Hooker, Betty Everett, Jimmy Reed, Jerry Butler, The Staple Singers, Gene Chandler and the Dells, among many others.

On April 1, 2015, it was announced that Concord Music Group merged with the Bicycle Music Company, a leading independent music publisher, record label and rights manager to form the fully integrated recorded music and publishing company Concord Bicycle Music. Concord Music and Bicycle Music operated as individual divisions within Concord Bicycle Music (CBM), with Concord Music Group being primarily responsible for recorded music activities and Bicycle overseeing publishing and rights management. CBM then immediately announced that it had acquired Vanguard Records and Sugar Hill Records from the Welk Music Group.

=== Concord Bicycle Music (2015–2017) ===
On October 28, 2014, Alchemy Copyrights LLC was incorporated, with its headquarters registered as Wilmington, Delaware. On December 23, 2014, its Nashville-based subsidiary and namesake was formed.

On April 1, 2015, Concord Music Group, still led by Glen Barros, announced its merger with Bicycle Music, owned by Wood Creek and led by Jake Wisely. The merged companies became subsidiaries of Concord Bicycle Music, a portfolio company of Wood Creek, with Scott Pascucci as CEO. The Concord Music Group division oversaw recorded music activities, and the Bicycle Music Company division managed publishing and rights. As Concord Bicycle Music, the company acquired Razor & Tie, Vanguard Records, Sugar Hill Records, Wind-up Records, Fearless Records, and Musart Music Group including its Edimusa publishing arm (2016).

Following the merger announcement, the Delaware parent and the California branch of Concord Bicycle Assets LLC were incorporated on October 21 and 22, 2015, respectively.

On June 2, 2017, Concord Bicycle Music purchased European-based publishing company Imagem Music Group from a Dutch pension fund. After acquiring two theatrical licensing companies, Tams-Witmark Music Library and Samuel French in 2018, the company formed its own Theatricals division.

=== Concord Music (2017–19) ===
During 2017, the Concord Music Group, Bicycle Music and Imagem divisions of Concord Bicycle Music were consolidated as Concord Music, and Barros was appointed as chief operating officer. (Note: At the time of the Imagem acquisition in June 2017, the company still went by Concord Bicycle Music.)

In 2017, a streaming rights deal signed between Universal and Spotify gave Concord access to Spotify's marketing tools.

By 2018, in the estimation of its chief business development officer Steve Salm, the company's revenue placed it in between "corporate giants" and "most indies", which gave it "an advantage in deals".

In 2019, Concord purchased the German music publishing company Hans Sikorski, and has since amalgamated it with the previously acquired Boosey & Hawkes.

=== Concord (2019–26) ===
By May 1, 2019, the company was rebranded as Concord. (Note: Concord had already appeared in press under this name in mid-2018.) Concord Music had described itself as "a wholly owned subsidiary" or as "the operating entity of Alchemy Copyrights LLC, an investment company that is owned by Barings Alternative Investments, (Note: Wood Creek, the owner of Concord since 2013, was merged by its owner, Mass Mutual, with Baring Asset Management and two other investment firms to form Barings LLC in September 2016.) Sound Investors, and seventy institutional and individual partners, including forty members of Concord Music's management team". After rebranding, Concord would define itself as "a private company funded by long-term institutional capital and members of Concord's management team". By July 2020, Alchemy Copyrights was trading as Concord; the State of Michigan Retirement System was its "ultimate parent".

On January 1, 2021, Jake Wisely, the former Bicycle Music CEO and a partner at Concord, was succeeded by Jim Selby as the chief publishing executive of Concord and joined its board of directors.

On April 26, 2021, Concord acquired Downtown's copyrights consisting of 145,000 owned and co-published copyrights for $300 million.

In late 2021, incoming interest prompted Concord majority owner, the Michigan State Retirement System, to consider a sale of its stake in the company. "We got some very strong bids, and we passed on all of them," commented the then Concord CEO Scott Pascucci. Pascucci reported that Concord received several bids that were "extremely aggressive" but none that were "extraordinary plus."

In September 2022, Concord purchased the publishing and recorded music catalogues of Tony Banks, Phil Collins, and Mike Rutherford, as well as the publishing and recorded music catalogue from their years in the band Genesis.

In December 2022, Concord successfully closed $1.8 billion of senior notes, secured by a significant portion of its diversified catalogue of sound recordings and songs. Led by Apollo Global Management and assisted by J.P. Morgan, it was the largest asset-backed securitization offering of music rights in the industry to date in terms of both size of issuance and number of assets (over one million copyrights). Proceeds from the issuance were to be reinvested to support Concord's continued growth in 2023 and beyond.

On July 1, 2023, Bob Valentine (previously the chief financial officer) replaced Scott Pascucci as CEO, and Pascucci was appointed to the board of directors.

On August 11, 2023, Concord, (Note: The legal entity involved is Concord Bicycle Assets LLC.) together with its distributor Universal Music Group and Sony Music, the two music industry giants, sued the Internet Archive over its Great 78 Project for $621 million in damages from alleged copyright infringement. The charge was filed before the United States District Court for the Southern District of New York on the date of its final ruling in the Hachette v. Internet Archive case.

In September 2023, it was announced Concord had acquired the music publishing catalog of the New York, Nashville, and London-based music publisher, Mojo Music & Media. The catalog includes works of bands such as REO Speedwagon, Kiss, and Cheap Trick.

Additionally in September 2023, Concord (Note: The legal entity involved was a British subsidiary of Concord, Concord Cadence Limited.) made an offer to acquire the entirety of Round Hill Music Royalty Fund (RHM) – the UK-listed fund operated by Round Hill Music. In October 2023, the RHM shareholders approved the acquisition, with over 99% of shareholders supporting the deal. With this transaction, Concord exceeded the $2 billion mark in its spending "across recorded music, music publishing and theatricals" since the 2015 merger.

In 2024, Concord agreed to acquire the Hipgnosis Songs Fund, a music catalog investment company for approximately $1.4 billion. Concord was later outbid by the investment firm Blackstone, which acquired Hipgnosis for $1.6 billion.

On March 24, 2025, Concord acquired Stem Distribution, which provides personalized distribution, digital strategy, data-driven insights, playlisting, and more for independent artists and labels. Stem would continue to be operated as a separate division within Concord Label Group.

In April 2026, Concord announced that the company would merge with BMG. The company's publishing division would be called BMG Publishing and its recorded music division would be called Concord Records. The global headquarters for the combined company would be in Nashville, and Bob Valentine, CEO of Concord at the time, would be the designated CEO of BMG. The new firm was scheduled to operate under the BMG name, with Bertelsmann owning a 67% stake in the new company, with the remainder owned by Great Mountain Partners. The merger was approved by the German Federal Cartel Office on June 12, 2026, and the US competition authorities on June 17, 2026, and the merger was completed on September 1, 2026.

== Divisions ==
=== Concord Music Publishing ===
In 2017, when Concord purchased the Imagem Music Group, it tripled the size of its catalog bringing it to nearly 800,000 copyrights. The Imagem purchase also brought classical music publisher Boosey & Hawkes and The Rodgers & Hammerstein Organization into Concord Music Publishing. Concord's publishing catalog now includes a vast array of popular music, classical music and many song and stage standards.

As of 2022, Concord Music Publishing's active roster includes The 1975, Glen Ballard, Fiona Bevan, BIA, Jason Robert Brown, Tofer Brown, Daft Punk, Davido, Chase + Status, Cautious Clay, Jacob Collier, Denzel Curry, James Earp, Jasper Harris, Ruston Kelly, Tom Kitt, Hillary Lindsey, Duff McKagan, Lori McKenna, Josh Miller, Justin Parker, Steve Reich, John Adams, Steve Robson, Mark Ronson, Anthony Rossomando, Biff Stannard, Varren Wade, Walshy Fire, Tion Wayne, Eric Whitacre, Oh Wonder and Yola.

Concord Music Publishing's catalog of songwriters and composers includes Benny Blanco, Leonard Bernstein Sammy Cahn, Phil Collins, Willie Colón, Aaron Copland, John Fogerty, Marvin Hamlisch, Oscar Hammerstein II, Imagine Dragons, Iron Maiden, Robert Johnson, Cyndi Lauper, Jimmy Napes, Pink Floyd, Sergei Prokofiev, Trent Reznor, Richard Rodgers, Santigold, Joan Sebastian, Pete Seeger, Nikki Sixx, Igor Stravinsky and Ryan Tedder.

In January 2020, Concord acquired a stake in PULSE Music Group, a move into chart-focused A&R. Effective July 2020, Concord will administer the catalog and future signings for PULSE, an additional 10,000 songs. PULSE's current songwriter roster includes James Blake, Cordae, Trevor Daniel, El-P, Brent Faiyaz, FNZ, Tyler Johnson, Kehlani, Bonnie McKee, OG Parker, OZ, Rich The Kid, Starrah, Ty Dolla $ign, and YEBBA. The PULSE roster is credited with over 150 million units of recorded music sales, 10 billion streams and more than 250 Platinum and Gold RIAA certifications.

Concord Music Publishing has also launched the new, Nashville-based talent and creative development venture Hang Your Hat Music, in partnership with Grammy, CMA and ACM awarded songwriter Hillary Lindsey.

In April 2021, Concord acquired the roster and catalogue of Downtown Music Publishing bringing its catalog to nearly 600,000 works.

In August 2022, Concord acquired Australian music publisher Native Tongue, effectively launching Concord Music Publishing ANZ.

=== Concord Label Group ===
Concord Label Group is made up of the original Concord Music Group labels at the time of the Bicycle Music merger (wholly owned Concord/Rounder, Concord Jazz and Fantasy Records), with Easy Eye Sound and Loma Vista Recordings as Joint Ventures. This area of Concord's business also includes its KIDZ BOP brand and its Craft Recordings catalog division. In early 2019, the company opened an office in Miami for Craft Latino Recordings.

Craft represents the many labels for which these artists' originally recorded, including Sugar Hill, Vanguard, Musart, Savoy Jazz, Stax, Vee-Jay, Fania, Independiente and Varese Sarabande. Craft also represents the R.E.M. catalog originally released under Warner Bros. Records.

In September 2022, Concord acquired the assets of L.A. Reid's HitCo Entertainment.

In June 2023, Concord and PULSE Music Group launched a new label, dubbed PULSE Records. The deal builds on a partnership between Pulse and Concord started in 2020 when Concord's music publishing division acquired a stake in Pulse Music Group to form a joint venture that included Concord administering Pulse's catalog and future signings.

In September 2024, Concord Label Group merged the operations of Concord Records and Fantasy Records. Mark Williams and Margi Cheske are co-presidents of the new combination.

==== Concord Records and Jazz ====
- Keb' Mo'
- Tears For Fears
- Esperanza Spalding
- The Offspring
- Boz Scaggs
- James Taylor
- Nathaniel Rateliff & The Night Sweats
- Valerie June
- Allison Russell
- Lukas Nelson
- Tanya Tucker
- Steve Perry
- Tedeschi Trucks Band
- Seether

==== Fearless Records ====
- I Prevail
- Pierce the Veil
- Ice Nine Kills
- IDKHow
- Starset

==== Loma Vista Recordings ====
- Ghost
- St. Vincent
- The Revivalists
- Denzel Curry
- Common
- KoRn
- Andrew Bird
- Robert Glasper
- Killer Mike

==== Rounder Records ====
- The Bobs
- Dawes
- I'm With Her
- Sarah Jarosz
- Amythyst Kiah
- Billy Strings
- Sierra Ferrell
- Samantha Fish
- Robert Plant & Alison Krauss
- Ruston Kelly

==== Craft Recordings ====
- Thelonious Monk
- Jewel
- R.E.M.
- Otis Redding
- Creedence Clearwater Revival
- Vince Guaraldi
- Hans Zimmer
- Little Richard
- Traveling Wilburys
- Isaac Hayes
- Evanescence
- Natalie Cole
- Creed
- Whitesnake

==== Craft Latino Recordings ====
- Antonio Aguilar
- Joan Sebastian

==== Kidz Bop ====
Concord's Kidz Bop label has sold 23 million albums, generated 8 billion streams, has a featured channel on SiriusXM and an international tour under its name.

=== Concord Theatricals ===
In the merger with the Bicycle Music Company, Concord acquired the rights to the musicals of Marvin Hamlich. Concord entered the theatrical licensing business in 2016 with the launch of The Musical Company in partnership with the Really Useful Group. Concord expanded its theatrical properties when the acquisition of Imagem in 2017 included the Rodgers & Hammerstein Organization. In 2018, Concord purchased theatrical licensing companies Tams-Witmark and Samuel French, and combining then with R&H Theatricals and its share of The Musical Company, launched its Theatrical division.

In May 2025, it was announced that Concord Theatricals acquired Broadway Licensing Global and its family of imprints, including Broadway Licensing, Dramatists Play Service, Playscripts and Stage Rights. Concord Theatricals services both creators and producers of musicals and plays with theatrical licensing, script publishing and cast recordings. It also develops, licenses, produces and invests in musicals and plays for production.

The professional and amateur theatrical licensing catalog includes Samuel French, R&H Theatricals and Tams-Witmark, as well as Broadway Licensing Global and its family of imprints, including Dramatists Play Service and Playscripts, representing the works of Agatha Christie, James Graham, Katori Hall, Lorraine Hansberry, Jerome Kern, Irving Berlin, George & Ira Gershwin, Rodgers and Hart, Cole Porter, Kurt Weill, Rodgers and Hammerstein, Jule Styne, Comden and Green, Charles Strouse & Lee Adams, Cy Coleman, Jerry Herman, Kander and Ebb and Marvin Hamlisch, Kander & Ebb, Marlow & Moss, Arthur Miller, Dominique Morisseau, Thornton Wilder, Tennessee Williams, August Wilson, and Harry Potter Theatrical Productions, as well as shows and songs by musical theater composers Lin-Manuel Miranda, Adam Guettel, Jason Robert Brown, Shaina Taub and Michael John LaChiusa.

Concord Theatricals also licenses hundreds of Broadway musicals including The Wizard of Oz, A Chorus Line, Hello Dolly, Bye Bye Birdie, Dreamgirls, Hair, Gypsy, Operation Mincemeat, Stereophonic, Some Like It Hot Oh, Mary, Harry Potter and the Cursed Child, SIX, SpongeBob The Musical and Hadestown.

Playwrights include George S. Kaufman, Lindsay and Crouse, Agatha Christie, Thornton Wilder, Noël Coward, Tennessee Williams, Neil Simon, Edward Albee, Lorraine Hansberry, Tom Stoppard, Caryl Churchill, August Wilson, Harvey Fierstein, Ken Ludwig, Dominique Morisseau, Anne Washburn and Mac Rogers.

Concord Theatricals also works with Andrew Lloyd Webber and the Really Useful Group to license the composer and his collaborators' musicals, including Jesus Christ Superstar, School of Rock, Evita, Cats, and Joseph and the Amazing Technicolor Dreamcoat.

Concord Theatricals is a co-producer on the currently running Broadway shows Hadestown and the 2022 revival of Into The Woods for which Concord Theatricals/Craft Recordings released the cast album. The Into the Woods (2022 Broadway Cast Recording) won the Grammy Award for Best Music Theater Album on February 5, 2023.

=== Concord Originals ===
In 2019, Concord formed a Film & Television Development and Production Department to oversee all long-form audio-visual content produced by both Concord and third-party companies. In 2021, the company launched Concord Originals as its narrative content creation business that will focus on developing and producing stories anchored by Concord's artists, music and theatrical works. The division's slate consists of feature films, series, documentaries and podcasts, including remakes and re-imaginings of properties from Concord's iconic portfolio.

Concord Originals recently executive produced Billie, a documentary about Billie Holiday which premiered at Telluride Film Festival in 2019. The business is in development on several major screen projects based on iconic musicals by Rodgers & Hammerstein: a TV series reimagining of Oklahoma!, which Concord Originals is producing alongside Skydance TV, a remake of The King and I with Temple Hill at Paramount Pictures and a contemporary take on Flower Drum Song with Daniel Dae Kim's 3AD and Janet Yang Productions. Additional announced projects include a scripted series centering the history-making label Fania with Sherry Marsh, Jorge Granier and Sergio Pizzolante, an elevated genre film inspired by the music of blues legend Robert Johnson and a scripted podcast that tells the story behind the classic Mexican ballad Peregrina with Prodigal Entertainment. Concord Originals has also partnered with Skydance and Jennifer Lopez's Nuyorican Productions to develop a slate of original projects based on Concord's catalog of theatrical works.

In 2025, Concord Originals acquired the latest incarnation of the classic Hollywood studio RKO Pictures along with the derivative rights to the more than 5,000 titles that the studio retained. RKO will continue to operate as an imprint under Concord Originals.
