= Joseph Hart (entertainer) =

American songwriter

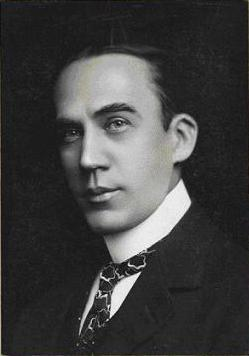
- Joseph Hart
- Born: June 8, 1861; Boston, Massachusetts, U.S.A.
- Died: October 3, 1921 (aged 60); New York City, New York, U.S.A.
- Occupations: Vaudeville entertainer, writer and producer
- Writing career
- Years active: 1867–1903

Joseph Hart (June 8, 1861 – October 3, 1921) was an American vaudevillian entertainer, manager, producer and songwriter.

== Early life ==
Joseph Hart Boudrow was born in Boston, Massachusetts on June 8, 1861, to James H. and Sarah E. Boudrow. His father, a Boston area junk dealer, was from Nova Scotia, the son of French immigrants who had settled there in the early 1800s. Hart's mother was a native of Massachusetts. Joseph Hart took to the stage at an early age playing boy's roles at Boston's Howard Athenaeum, then managed by his uncle, Josh Hart.

== Career ==
While still in his teens Hart began touring with I. W. Baird's Minstrel Show as an end man, the musician stationed at the end of a line of performers. Soon Hart became a crowd favorite for his banjo playing, singing and comedy routines that he often wrote himself.

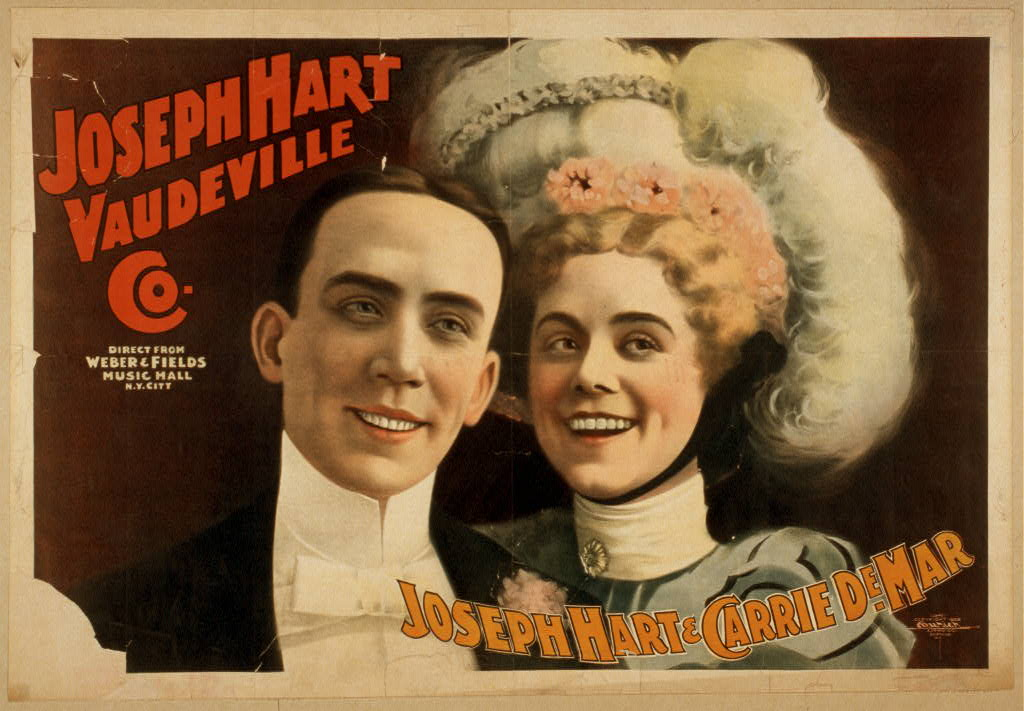
Hart and Carrie DeMar (1899)

Later he joined other minstrel troupes such as Simmons and Slocomb and Tony Pastors Minstrels before entering vaudeville to play Ko-Ko in W. S. Gilbert and Arthur Sullivan's The Mikado and as a performer in Princess Ida.

In 1888 Hart joined forces with Frederick Hallen as Hallen and Hart, and toured for six years in Later On, a musical comedy he wrote with H. Grattan Donnelly. This success was followed by a two-year run of The Idea, written with Herbert Hall Winslow.

Hart next struck out on his own touring with his play The Gay Old Boy (1894–95), A Tarrytown Widow (1897–98), by Charles T. Dazey, Foxy Grandpa (an adaptation from the Carl E. Schultze comic strip, 1901–05) and Girls Will Be Girls (1903–04), the latter two written in collaboration with Melville Baker. Hart and his wife, Carrie DeMar, later reprised their Foxy Grandpa roles in two short films, The Boys Think They Have One on Foxy Grandpa and Foxy Grandpa and Polly in a Little Hilarity.

Hart's later years were primarily spent as a writer and producer of vaudeville shows.

== Personal life ==
On August 1, 1894, Hart married his co-star Carrie De Mar, an actress, dancer and singer whom he had worked with for a number of years.

Hart died suddenly on October 3, 1921, from a stroke he suffered at his New York residence on West 54th Street, with his wife was at his side.
