= Frederick Hallen =

Canadian vaudeville entertainer

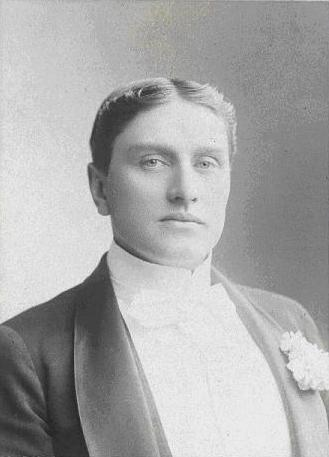
- Hallen, c. 1890s
- Born: 1 January 1859; Montreal, United Province of Canada
- Died: 28 February 1920 (aged 60); New York City, New York, U.S.
- Other name: Fred Hallen
- Occupation: Vaudeville Entertainer
- Years active: 1880–1919

Frederick Hallen (1 January 1859 – 28 February 1920) was a Canadian-born vaudeville entertainer who found popularity on the North American stage.

== Biography ==
Frederick "Fred" Hallen was born in Montreal, United Province of Canada. He began touring the vaudeville circuit as early as 1880 with his American wife Enid Hart, as "Hallen and Hart". A year or so before she died in 1890 at the young age of 32, he teamed up with Joseph Hart, as "Hallen and Hart" (again), and found success touring for several seasons with Hart's musical comedies, Later On and The Idea. After the two went their separate ways, Hallen and his second wife, Mollie (or Molly) Fuller, became a headlining vaudeville act. Hallen and Fuller were known for their short comedic plays and skits performed in vaudeville houses across North America for nearly a quarter century.

In 1900, Hallen starred in the Broadway musical Aunt Hannah at the Bijou Theatre; a work created by composer A. Baldwin Sloane, lyricist Clay M. Greene, and writer Matthew J. Royal.

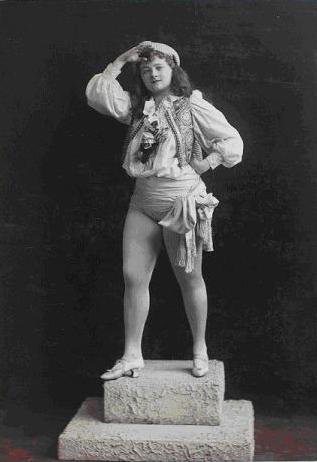
Mollie Fuller NYPL Digital Gallery (ca. 1890s)

Hallen died of stomach cancer on 28 February 1920, at his residence in The New York Palace Hotel. Two months earlier he had fallen ill during an engagement in Toronto, Ontario, Canada and was later told his condition was terminal. Hallen was survived by his wife, Mollie.

== Mollie Fuller ==
After producer Edward Franklin Albee learned that Mollie Fuller was nearly blind and living in poverty in Chicago, he brought her back to New York where he asked writer Blanche Merrill to write a piece for her to perform in. With the help of friends Fuller, returned to the stage in December 1922 to appear in the playlet Twilight staged in Brooklyn and later at the Strand Theatre in Hoboken, New Jersey.

Before her vaudeville days Fuller was on the legitimate stage in productions like the burlesque musical Adonis, by Edward E. Rice and William F. Gill, and Rice's Evangeline, in which she replaced Fay Templeton when the actress was unavailable. The highlight of her career came in 1895 when Hallen bought the rights to the play The Twentieth Century Girl and cast her in the title role.

Fuller died at around the age of 68 in Hollywood, California, on 5 January 1933. At the time of her death she was receiving assistance from The Troupers, a national vaudeville players association. Her funeral expenses were handled by the National Vaudeville Artist organization.
