= Charles K. Harris =

American songwriter

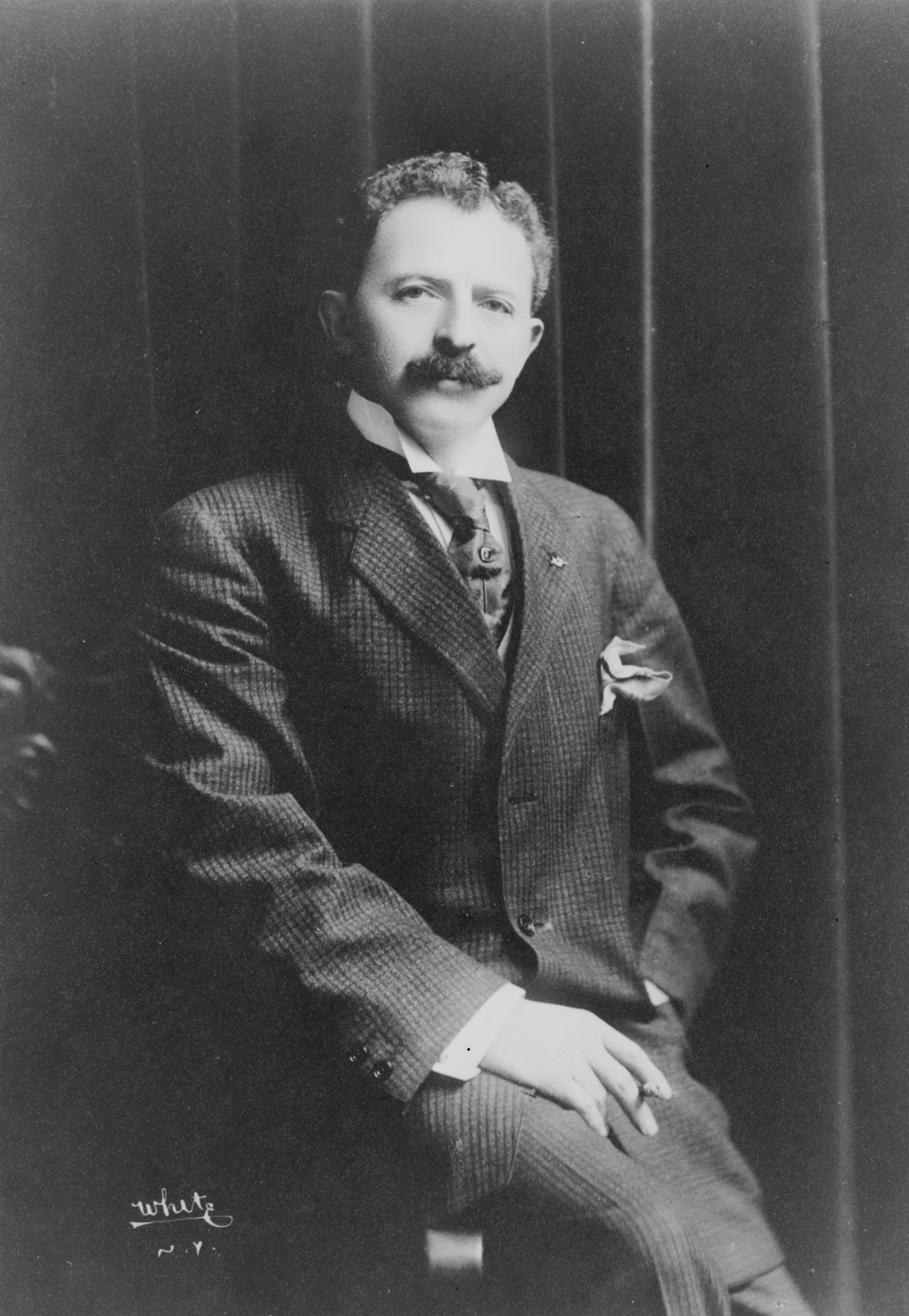

Background information
- Born: May 1, 1867; Poughkeepsie, New York, U.S.
- Died: December 22, 1930 (aged 63) New York City, U.S.
- Genres: Popular music
- Occupation: Songwriter
- Years active: 1885–1929

Charles Kassel Harris (May 1, 1867 – December 22, 1930) was a well regarded American songwriter of popular music. During his long career, he advanced the relatively new genre, publishing more than 300 songs, often deemed by admirers as the "king of the tear jerkers". He is one of the early pioneers of Tin Pan Alley.

== Biography ==
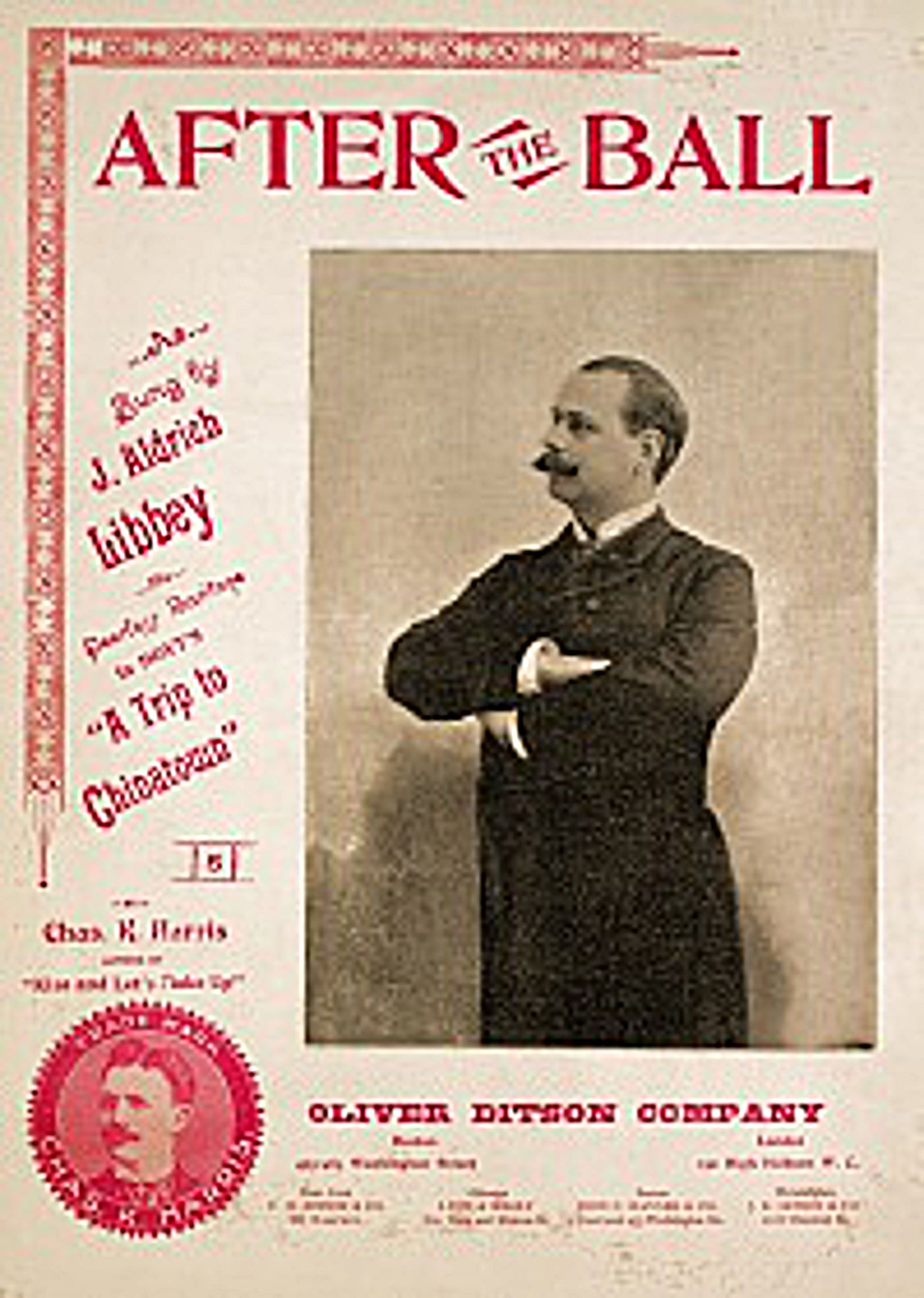
"After the Ball" sheet music cover

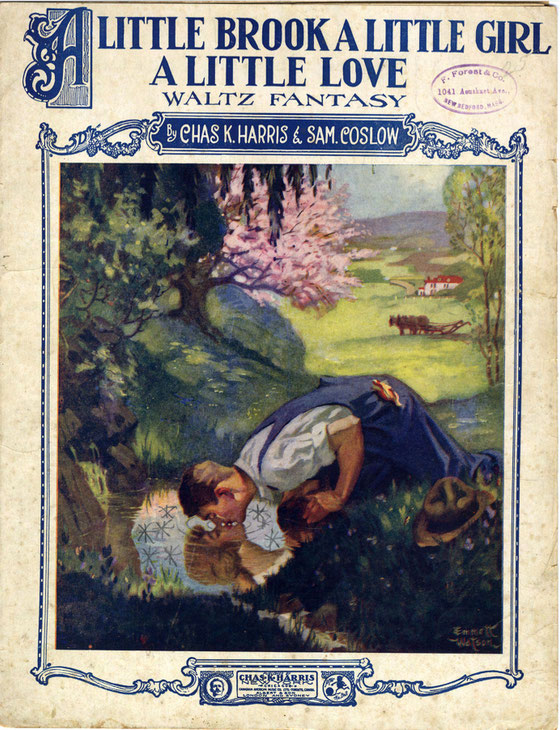
"A Little Brook, a Little Girl, a Little Love" sheet music cover by Emmett Watson

Harris was born in Poughkeepsie, New York into a Jewish family of ten children. His father was a fur trader and moved the family to Saginaw, Michigan and Milwaukee, Wisconsin, where he grew up. From his early fascination with the banjo, he wrote his first song "Since Maggie Learned To Skate" for the play The Skating Rink by Nat Goodwin in 1885.

In 1892, Harris wrote "After the Ball", a song about an old man recounting the story of his long-lost love to his niece. He caught the attention of John Philip Sousa, who played the tune at the 1893 World Columbian Exposition in Chicago, boosting sheet music sales to in excess of five million copies in the 1890s.

His next hit "Break the News to Mother", about a dying soldier, coincided with the Spanish–American War in 1897 and furthered his popularity. It was also a hit during 1917 and 1918, with recordings by the Shannon Four and Henry Burr.

In 1899, he drew upon his own experiences as a Jew to compose "A Rabbi's Daughter".

Harris's sentimental songs were introduced on stages and music halls, but they found ready acceptance among folkloric string bands of the South. Both "Fallen By the Wayside"' and "There’ll Come a Time" were recorded by Charlie Poole and the North Carolina Ramblers, and both "Mid the Green Fields of Virginia" and his extremely popular song from 1901, "Hello Central, Give Me Heaven", were recorded by The Carter Family.

Harris in a 1929 Screen Songs reel singing "After the Ball" from A Trip to Chinatown.

Later, Harris began writing songs for musicals, working with Oscar Hammerstein. His plays The Scarlet Sisters and What's The Matter With Julius had moderate success.

In 1929, he appeared in a Screen Songs reel, wherein he performed his foremost song, "After the Ball".

== Books ==
In 1906 Harris also penned and self-published the book How to Write a Popular Song. In 1926, Harris published his autobiography bearing the title, After the Ball. According to The New York Times Book Review, the book generated a "deluge of letters from amateur musicians expressing their high regard for his work."

== Death ==
He died in New York City in 1930.
