= Cat suit =

Suit made to resemble a feline

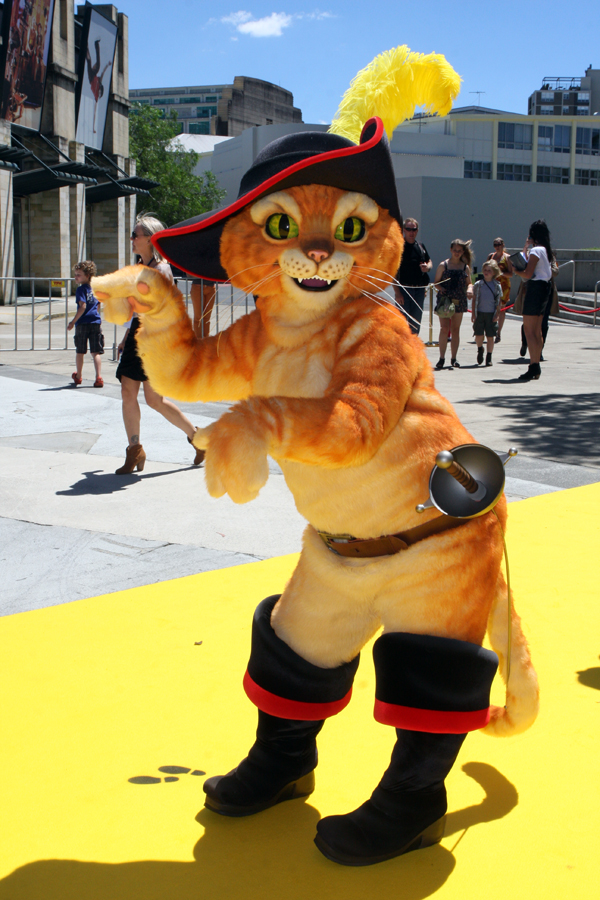
A costume of the character Puss in Boots being used to promote the film of the same name.

Cat suits are a type of costumed character or creature suit resembling a cat, or any member of the Felidae. They are one of the most popular choices of mascot, and both stylized and realistic cat suits are commonly used in film and on stage, due to the frequent cultural depictions of cats. They are also used for advertising, entertainment and educational purposes.

== In theatre ==
An elaborate costume of the Cowardly Lion was created for the 1902 musical theatre version of The Wizard of Oz, where it was played by Arthur Hill, a popular animal impersonator.

In the musical The Wiz, an African-American retelling of the classic children's novel and musical The Wonderful Wizard of Oz, costume designer Tony Walton created a cat suit for the Cowardly Lion played by actor Ted Ross.

When creating the costumes for the musical Cats, designer John Napier followed the hints in T. S. Eliot's text, blending together the cat and human elements, while ensuring that the costumes were naturally flexible and easy to move in. In 2015, Napier was quoted as saying "A bit of a titter went around the theatre community that we were doing a show about pussycats, but I was determined to make it as rough as possible and not like a Puss in Boots pantomime". In a review of a production of Cats in Los Angeles, UCLA's student newspaper, the Daily Bruin, described the show's cat costumes as "frighteningly realistic".

== In film ==
The character of Aslan was portrayed with a realistic two-person puppet suit for the BBC production of The Chronicles of Narnia, where it was worn by Ailsa Berk and William Todd-Jones, and voiced by Ronald Pickup.

== In sports ==
Cat suits are widely used as the mascots of sports teams in schools. As of 2016, the second most popular animal used as high school sports mascot, after the eagle, was the tiger, which is picked because it symbolizes strength. Panthera and wildcats were also fourth and fifth, respectively, symbolizing speed and fierceness, respectively.

Other well-known cat mascot suits in sports include the Nittany Lion, which was inducted to the Mascot Hall of Fame.

They are also used in professional sports, such as the mascot DJ Kitty, which serves as a secondary mascot for the Tampa Bay Rays.

Additionally, cats are commonly used as Olympic mascots. One of the mascots of the 2014 Winter Olympics was a leopard, and one of the two mascots of the 2018 Winter Olympics is Soohorang, a white tiger that is represented by a "cute" mascot suit.

== In advertising ==
The character Tony the Tiger often makes promotional appearances as a mascot, and an animatronic suit of the character was created in 2016 by Jim Henson's Creature Shop. They are also made by the Olympus Group and serve the purpose of having people relate to the brand.

Costumes of the feline characters Puss in Boots and Kitty Softpaws were commissioned by DreamWorks Animation to promote the film Puss in Boots and appeared at its premiere alongside the characters' voice actors.

== In education ==
Suits of the character The Cat in the Hat are sold to schools and communities by the National Education Association to help teach children literacy, by relating it to the books of Dr. Seuss.

== In popular culture ==
The character Hello Kitty is often represented by mascot costumes, although she only bears the appearance of a cat and is not described as one by Sanrio.

One of the main characters of the video game 428: Shibuya Scramble is an unknown woman named Tama who wears a cat suit to promote a store.

Big cats are one of the most popular designs for fursuits, personal costumes created by the furry fandom.
