= The Wizard of Oz (1902 musical) =

1902 musical extravaganza

- Fred R. Hamlin's Musical Extravaganza
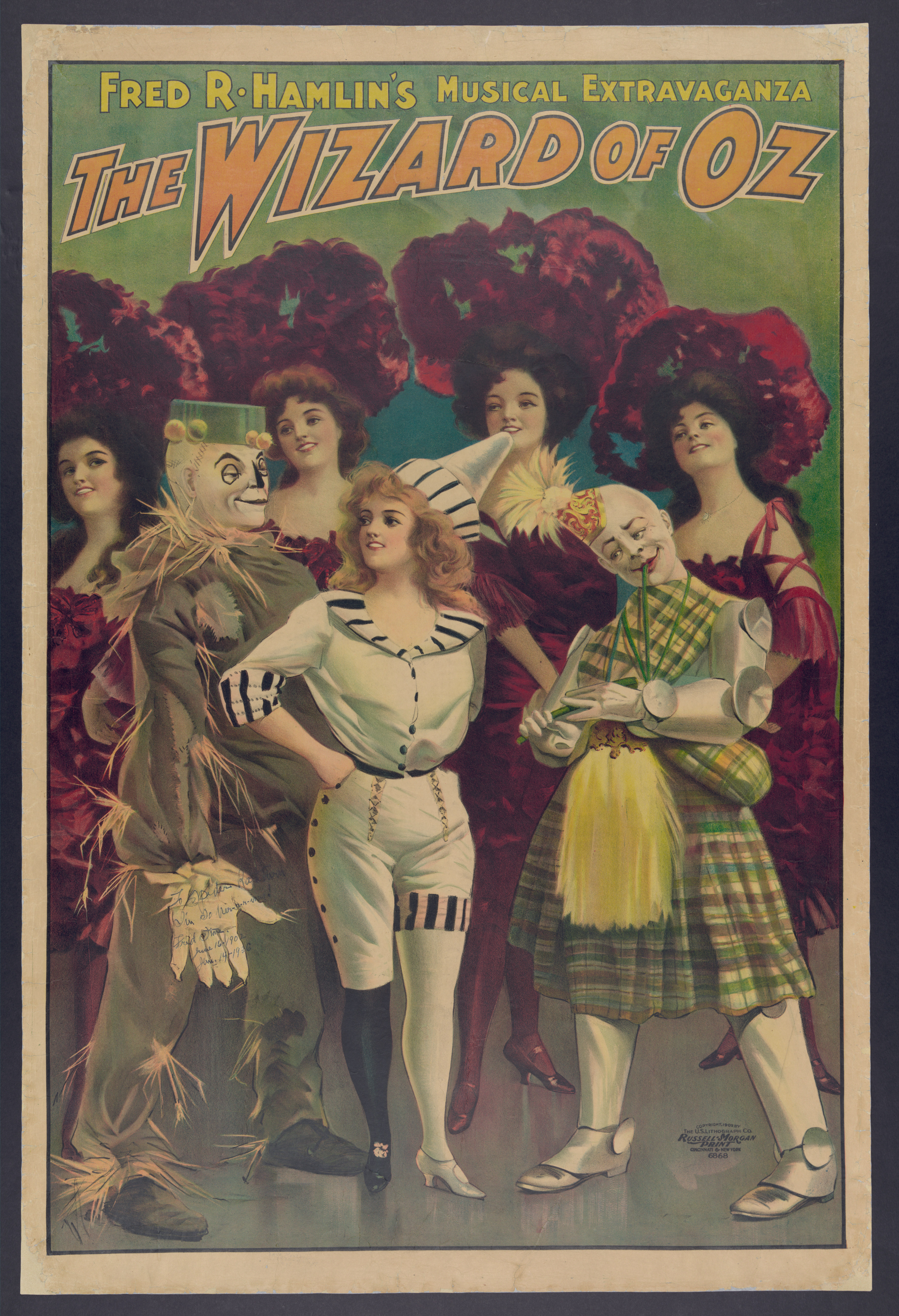
- One of many promotional posters for the show, this one showing the Dance of All Nations Scene.
- Music: Paul Tietjens; A. Baldwin Sloane; Charles A. Zimmerman; Gus Edwards; Leo Edwards and others
- Lyrics: L. Frank Baum; Vincent Bryan; Will D. Cobb; William Jerome and others
- Book: L. Frank Baum; Glen MacDonough; Finnegan
- Basis: The Wonderful Wizard of Oz by L. Frank Baum
- Productions: 1902 Chicago; 1903 Broadway

The Wizard of Oz was a 1902 musical extravaganza based on the 1900 novel The Wonderful Wizard of Oz by L. Frank Baum. Although Baum is the credited book writer, Glen MacDonough was hired on as ghostwriter after Baum had finished the script. Much of the original music was by Paul Tietjens, some of which has been lost, although it was still well-remembered and in discussion at MGM in 1939 when the classic film version of the story was made. The original show was particularly popular because of its two comedy stars: Fred Stone playing the Scarecrow, and David C. Montgomery as the Tin Woodman.

The show premiered at the Chicago Grand Opera House on June 16, 1902, and then went on tour throughout the upper Midwest before moving to the Majestic Theatre on Broadway on January 20, 1903, where it ran for 293 performances through October 3. A second company was established, and the show went on tour from September 1903 through March 1904 before returning to the Majestic with an updated "Edition De Luxe". This version played through May and then moved on to the New York Theater for three weeks before returning to Chicago for a five-week run to finish the season.

The two companies toured the country from August 1904 to April 1905, and again from September 1905 to May 1906. By this time, demand had slowed, and the second company was disbanded on February 28, 1906. The main "Company A" had one final tour from August to November 1906 before the rights were sold to Hurtig and Seamon. The new production resumed the tour through May 1907, and continued for the 1907–08 and 1908–09 seasons. Finally, the show was released to stock theater companies in 1911.

The show's history is covered in more than 100 pages of the book Oz Before the Rainbow: L. Frank Baum's 'The Wonderful Wizard of Oz' on stage and screen to 1939 by Mark Evan Swartz.

== Characters and original cast ==
In order of appearance, the 1902 Chicago cast consisted of:

Role and comments from program	Cast member
Dorothy Gale, a Kansas girl	Anna Laughlin
Imogene, Dorothy's Cow	Edwin J. Stone
Cynthia Cynch, the Lady Lunatic	Helen Byron
The Witch of the North, a friend in need	Aileen May
Sir Dashemoff Daily, Poet Laureate	Bessie Wynn[e]
The Army of Pastoria	Joseph Schrode
Pastoria II, Ex-King of the Emerald City	Neil McNeil
Tryxie Tryfle, prospective Queen of the Emerald City	Mabel Barrison
Brigadier General Riskitt, commanding Pastoria's Army	Harold Morey
The Scarecrow, looking for brains	Fred Stone
The Cowardly Lion	Arthur Hill
Nick Chopper, the Tin Woodman, in search of a heart	David C. Montgomery
The Poppy Queen	Georgia Baron
Private Gruph, the Guardian of the Gate	Harold Morey
Leo, Captain of the Relief Guards	Sidney Ainsworth
The Soldier with the Green Whiskers	Joseph Schrode
Sir Wiley Gyle, an Inventor who scorns all magical arts	Stephen Maley
Bardo, the Wizard's Factotum	Genevra Gibson
Oz, the Wonderful Wizard, Ruler of the Emerald City	John Slavin

There were several major character changes from the original book:

- Dorothy Gale's surname was introduced in the show. She had no surname in the original book, but the surname is mentioned in Ozma of Oz (1907).
- Imogene the Cow replaces Dorothy's dog Toto.
- The Good Witch of the North causes a snowfall which defeats the spell of the poppies that had put Dorothy and the Cowardly Lion to sleep – this idea was later used in the classic 1939 movie.
- The role of the Cowardly Lion was reduced to a bit part, mostly to add humor.
- The Tin Woodman is called Niccolo Chopper. In the book he had no name, but would be called Nick Chopper in the sequels.
- The Wicked Witch of the West is mentioned but does not appear in this version.
- New characters in the piece are Ex-King Pastoria II and his girlfriend Tryxie Tryfle (a waitress); Cynthia Cynch (a lady lunatic), Niccolo's love interest; Sir Dashemoff Daily (the poet laureate), Dorothy's love interest; Sir Wiley Gyle, and General Riskitt.

== Plot ==
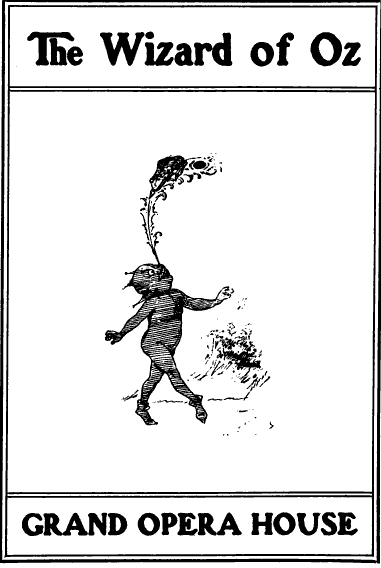
Cover of production announcement showing an 'Inland Gnome', drawn by W.W. Denslow in 1894

The main plot of the show, as recounted in newspapers of the time, is Pastoria's attempts to regain the throne from the Wizard of Oz. The original protagonists' search for the Wizard puts them on the wrong side of the law. Synopsis by David Maxine

=== Act One: The Storm ===
The show opens on a Kansas farm from which Dorothy and her pet calf Imogene are blown to the Land of Oz by a tornado. Dorothy's farmhouse lands on a Wicked Witch, and the Munchkins proclaim Dorothy their heroine for setting them free. Dorothy wants to go home to Kansas. The Good Witch of the North gives Dorothy a Ruby Ring and tells her to go to the Emerald City to ask the Wizard of Oz to send her back to Kansas. Dorothy also gets a love interest when Sir Dashemoff Daily, the poet laureate of Oz, falls in love with her.

Now, it so happens that a Kansas streetcar conductor named Pastoria, along with Tryxie Tryfle, his waitress-girlfriend, has been blown to Oz in the same tornado. To make matters more complicated, it turns out that Pastoria is the former King of Oz, having been ousted by the Wizard. Pastoria determines to regain his throne. Another new character is an Ophelia-like lady lunatic named Cynthia Cynch. She has gone "mad" searching for her long-lost lover, Niccolo Chopper.

Dorothy and her pet calf proceed on their journey and meet the Scarecrow and the Tin Woodman (who happens to be Cynthia Cynch's lover turned tin). Dorothy with her friends and Pastoria with his entourage all stumble into a deadly Poppy Field where they nearly perish from the poisonous breath of the flowers. Everyone is saved by the Witch of the North, who creates a summer snowstorm to break the spell of the poppies.

=== Act Two: The Emerald City ===
Dorothy and her friends arrive in the Emerald City where the Wizard grants brains to the Scarecrow and a heart to the Tin Woodman. To celebrate, the Wizard announces a "Ball of All Nations" in which everybody gets to sing a topical song of ethnic origin. Pastoria arrives in the Emerald City, breaks up with Tryxie Tryfle, and stages a coup in which the Wizard of Oz is arrested. Dorothy and her pals are declared enemies of the state and they run for their lives as Pastoria regains the throne of Oz.

=== Act Three: The Borderland ===
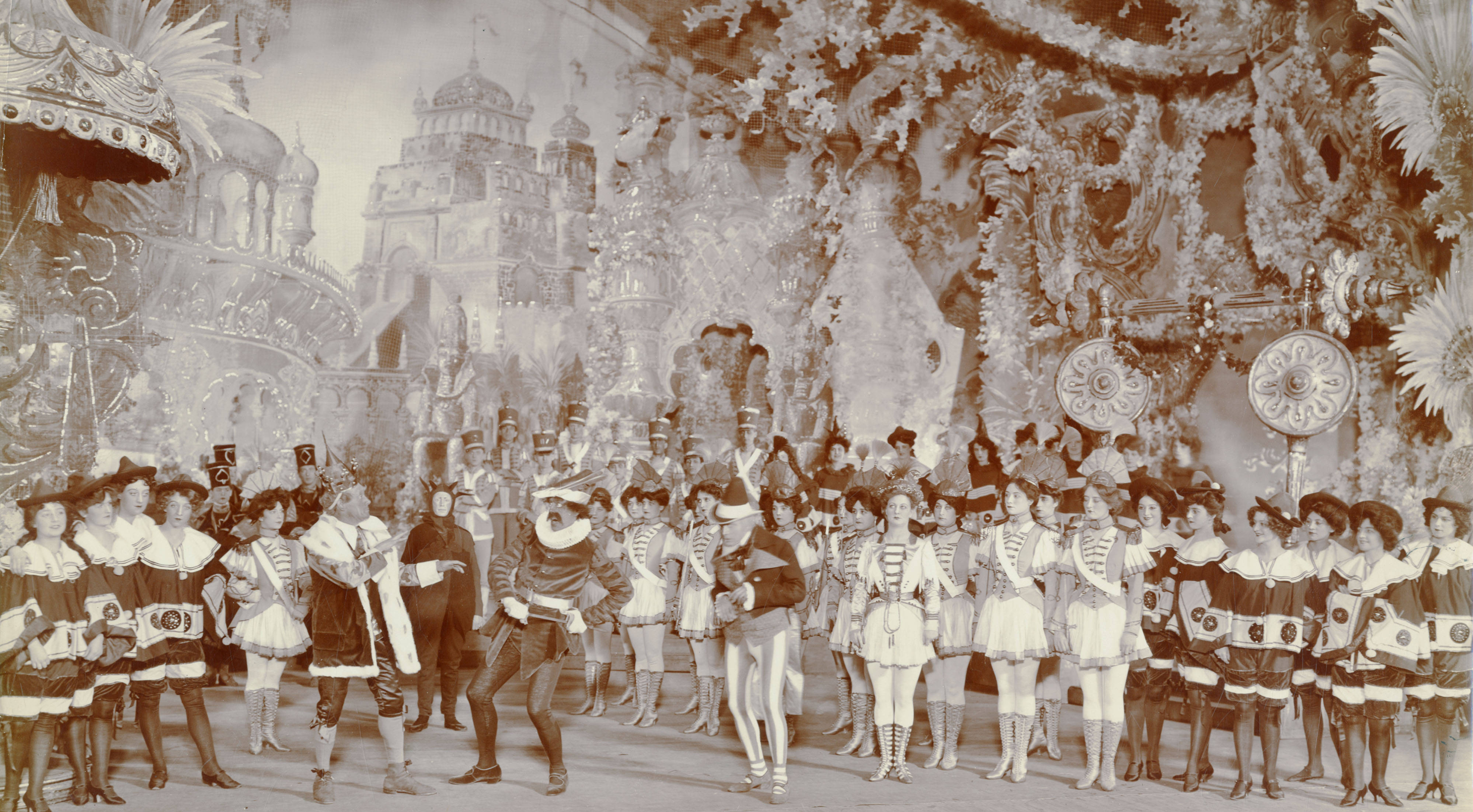
A scene from the play The Wizard of Oz, which opened October 16, 1904, at the Grand Opera House, Seattle.

In hiding and in disguise, Dorothy and company flee the Emerald City. They encounter Cynthia Cynch who is delighted to have found her missing tin lover. But alas, Dorothy, the Scarecrow, and Tin Woodman are eventually captured by Pastoria's henchmen and sentenced to death. Just as they are about to be executed, Dorothy calls on the Witch of the North, who magically appears and sets everyone free.

== Conception and script ==
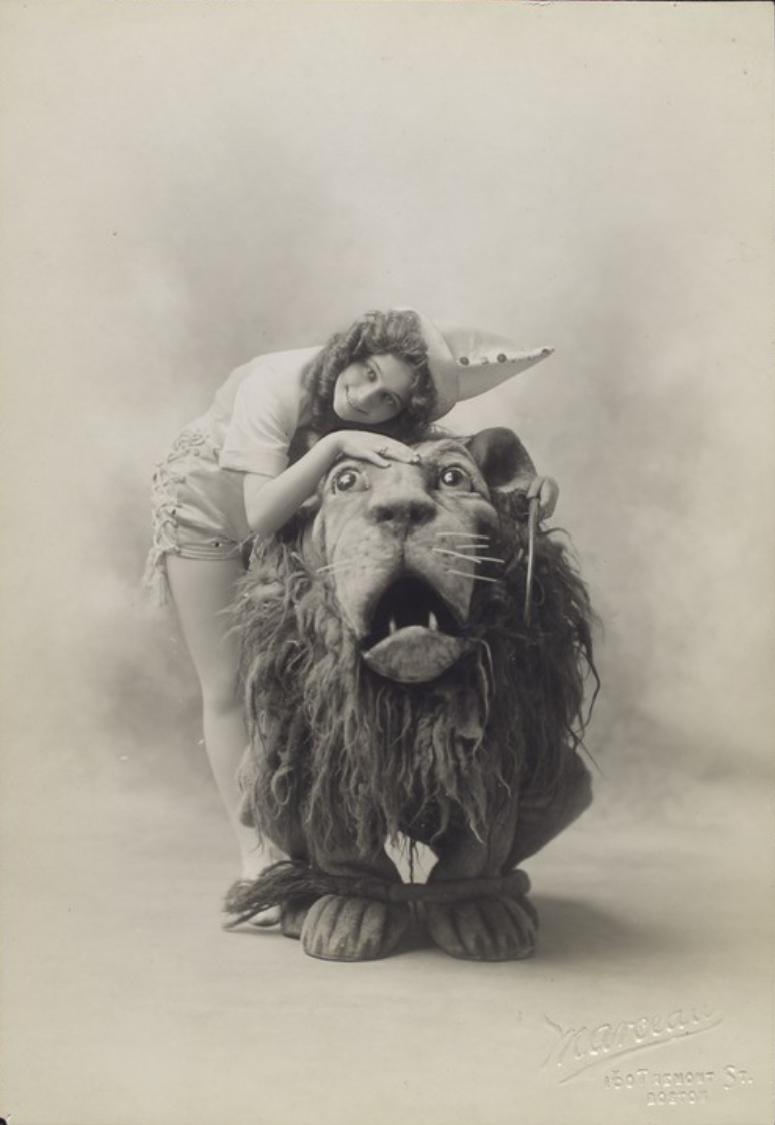
Arthur Hill as the Lion and Anna Laughlin as Dorothy

L. Frank Baum decided to collaborate with his friend, composer Paul Tietjens, and The Wonderful Wizard of Oz illustrator W. W. Denslow as set and costume designer, to bring the book to the stage. They completed a script, score and designs in 1901, hewing fairly close to the novel. They submitted the package to the manager of the Chicago Grand Opera House, Fred R. Hamlin, who liked it and approached Julian Mitchell to be director.

Mitchell did not like the script, criticizing its lack of spectacle, calling it too subdued and small-scale. However, he sent a wire to Hamlin with the message "Can see possibilities for extravaganza". When Mitchell accepted the project, he brought in new songwriters, cutting some of the original Tietjens numbers. He rewrote the script, together with Glen MacDonough, introducing new characters and incidents, reducing the Cowardly Lion's role, deleting the appearance of the Wicked Witch of the West entirely, and substituting a cow for Toto as Dorothy's companion. Baum was anxious about this, but went along. He hoped Mitchell's experience in directing, as well as the casting of comedy team Fred Stone and David C. Montgomery as the Scarecrow and Tin Woodman, would make the show a hit. It turned out to be a roaring success, with 293 performances.

== Original production ==
In rewriting Baum's 1901 script, Mitchell hired MacDonough to add topical humor. Baum described MacDonough as a New York joke writer in a letter to The Chicago Record-Herald, responding to criticism that the show "teemed with wild and woolly western puns and forced gags". In a letter to The Chicago Tribune published June 26, 1904, Baum decried rumors that he was "heartbroken and ashamed" with the final product of the musical: "I acknowledge that I was unwise enough to express myself as dissatisfied with the handling of my play on its first production ... few authors of successful books are ever fully satisfied with the dramatization of their work. They discern great gaps in the original story that are probably never noticed by playgoers." He admitted to protesting several innovations, but ultimately concluded: "The people will have what pleases them, and not what the author happens to favor, and I believe that one of the reasons why Julian Mitchell is regarded as a great producer is that he faithfully tries to serve the great mass of playgoers – and usually succeeds."

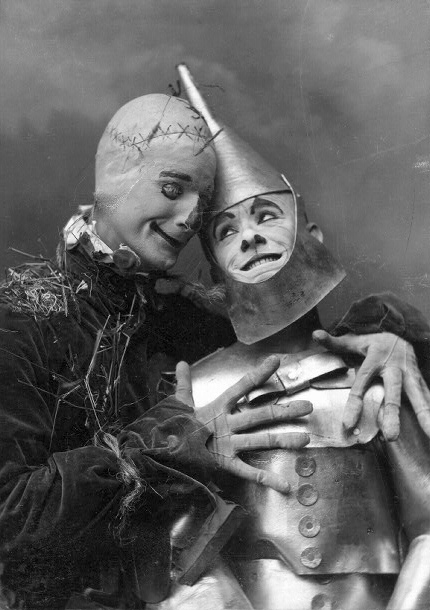
Fred Stone as the Scarecrow and David C. Montgomery as the Tin Woodman (1902)

Most of the original songs were written by Paul Tietjens on Baum's lyrics, except for three: "The Guardian of the Gate" (although it was attributed to Tietjens), which was cut after only a few performances, "The Different Ways of Making Love" (wooing) and "It Happens Every Day" were composed by Nathaniel D. Mann. Mann later wrote the score for Baum's 1908 film/theatrical presentation, The Fairylogue and Radio-Plays. Most of Baum's songs related to the story in some way, as in operetta, but as performed, the play was more like vaudeville, and new songs by other songwriters were frequently substituted. In fact, the first song interpolated into the musical was "The Traveler and the Pie", a major number for the Scarecrow. Baum and Tietjens had written it for a play called The Octopus; or the Title Trust, which was never produced and possibly never completed. The song stayed in the show. James O'Dea and Edward Hutchinson wrote one of the show's most celebrated songs, "Sammy", in which Tryxie Tryfle sings of a lost love before King Pastoria, though the only surviving recording of the piece was sung by a man (Harry Macdonough).

The witches are largely absent in this version; The Good Witch of the North appears, named Locusta, and The Wicked Witch of the East is a special effect. Toto, Dorothy's dog, was replaced by a cow named Imogene. The Wicked Witch of the West does not appear, but she is mentioned, and Glinda the Good Witch of the South, who had appeared only in Act Three, was written out by Mitchell in 1903. His re-write of that act was set in the Borderland that divides Oz and Glinda's Domain, as Dorothy and her friends try to escape Pastoria.

New characters include King Pastoria II, Oz's true king working as a Kansas motorman and his girlfriend, Tryxie Tryfle, a waitress. There is also Cynthia Cynch, the Lady Lunatic, a prototype for Nimmie Amee, Nick (Niccolo) Chopper's girlfriend. Niccolo Chopper is renowned for his ability on the piccolo, the subject of one of her songs, and he is shown playing a piccolo in The Wonderful Wizard of Oz, the first Oz film made without Baum's input, which was highly influenced by the popular play. The Wizard was presented as various ethnic stock character stereotypes, depending upon who played him. He was assisted by Sir Wiley Gyle and General Riskitt. David L. Greene and Dick Martin erroneously captioned a picture of General Riskitt as "Sir Wiley Gyle" in The Oz Scrapbook, and Donald Abbott carried this mistake over into his illustrations for How the Wizard Saved Oz.

The animals in the play, including the Cowardly Lion, did not speak, following the pantomime tradition. Although the lion costume was realistic, far more so than Bert Lahr's in the MGM film, his main purpose was a bit of comic relief and scaring off the villains on occasion. His quest for courage is completely omitted, much as the other characters' quests are deemphasized in favor of various comic routines. Ultimately, though, their desire to seek the Wizard's aid gets them caught on the wrong side of the revolution, jailed and ultimately scheduled for execution. In a deus ex machina, another tornado arrives to sweep Dorothy home from the chopping block.

Many new plot twists are virtually pointless. In addition to a kiss of protection, Dorothy gets three wishes, one of which is wasted on a triviality. The second is used to bring the Scarecrow to life, and the third is used so she can learn the song Sir Dashemoff Daily (a trouser role) has written to his girlfriend, Carrie Barry. This song was written by Baum and Tietjens, but some programs credited the song to Glen MacDonough and A. Baldwin Sloane to make their connection to the play look greater.

Probably the biggest influence on the 1939 MGM film, aside from making the story into a musical (but not using the score created for the stage version), is the field of poppies sequence that ended Act I. In the novel, Baum imaginatively has a legion of field mice pull a cart with the Cowardly Lion out of the poppy field. This was deemed unfeasible (though the stage version of The Wiz created a variation, with the mice as anthropomorphic vice cops), and Baum, though he included it in the 1901 script, replaced the scene with that of the Snow Queen creating a storm that destroys the poppies, much as Glinda does in the 1939 movie. This concluded Act I with an elaborate dance known as "Winter Jubilation", which James Patrick Doyle plays on synthesizers on the album, Before the Rainbow: The Original Music of Oz.

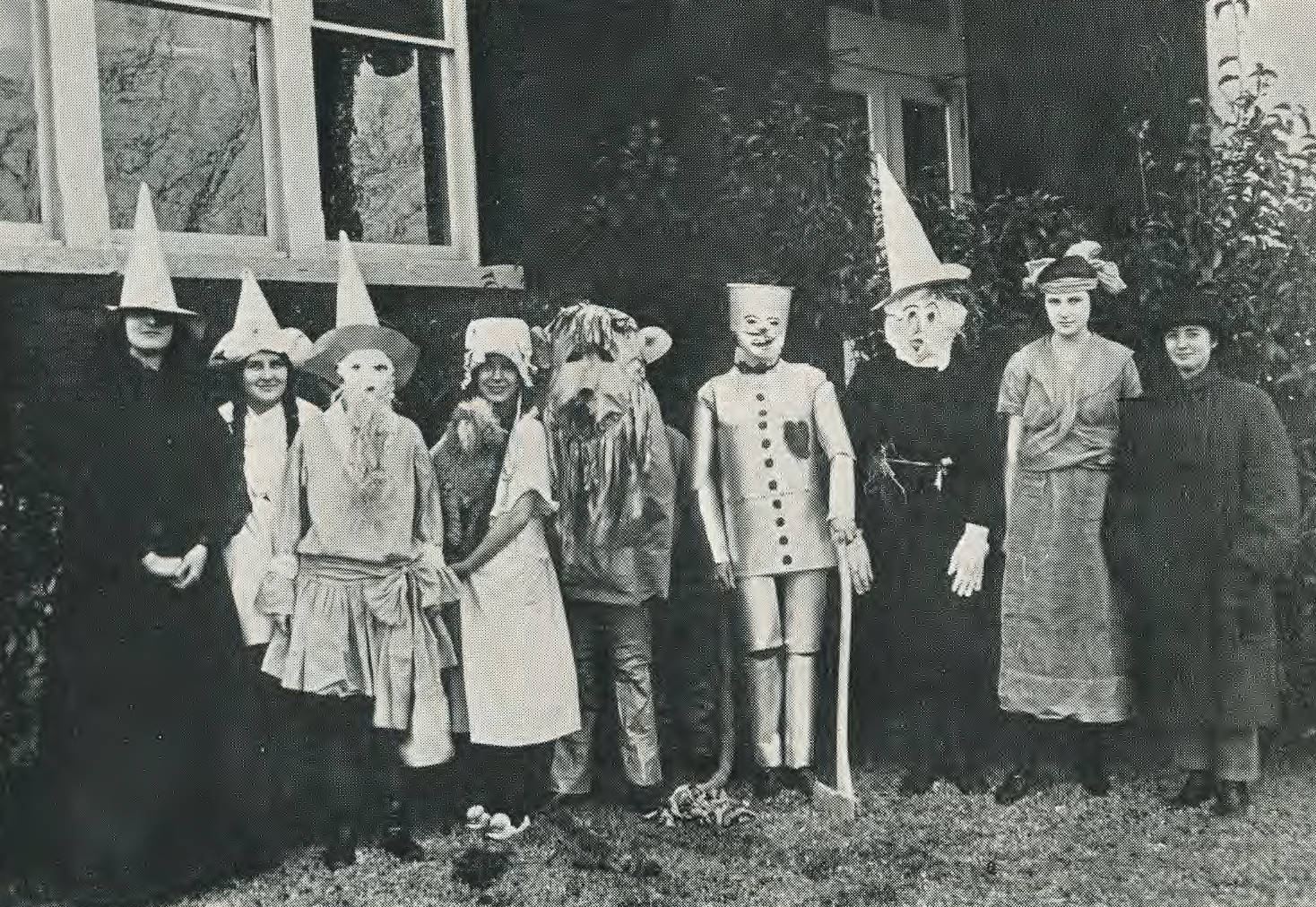
Cast of the production at East Texas State Normal College in 1921

Because there were no cast recordings until the late 1920s, theatre productions, including this production, often exceeded four hours in length because of multiple demands for encores, since many of the attendees knew they would never get to attend again. The most popular songs were often sung multiple times and this was often used to gauge whether a song should be retained or dropped. Two popular routines that were worked in include a sailing routine and a football routine, the latter parodying the level of violence in the sport, which had recently been lessened due to new regulations.

== Preparing for Broadway - The 1902 Midwest tour ==
After its successful summer run in Chicago, the show went on tour throughout the Midwest. This not only gave the cast more experience and increased publicity, but also provided a chance to make some adjustments to the show before it headed to Broadway. There were only a few cast changes in August prior to the tour: Carlton King and Grace Kimball took over the roles of Pastoria and Tryxie Tryfle, and Bobby Gaylor became the Wizard of Oz. Montgomery and Stone, who had been key to the success of the show as the Tin Woodman and Scarecrow, received five-year contracts.

== Success on Broadway, 1903 to 1904 ==
The Wizard of Oz opened at the Majestic Theatre on Broadway on January 21, 1903 and ran through October 3rd. Due to its success, a touring company ("Company 2") was created and began its tour on September 7, 1903 at the Montauk Theater in Brooklyn, NY. Several of the Broadway stars were part of that opening show, while their touring counterparts performed as understudies in New York City. They were joined on the tour circuit by the Broadway company ("Company A") on October 5, 1903. Both companies toured through March 1904, when Company A returned to the Majestic for another engagement through the end of April, with a revised show billed as the "Edition De Luxe" that included many new musical numbers.

The show changed venues to the New York Theatre for a short run on May 2-21, 1904, and then returned to Chicago's Grand Opera House for a triumphant revival in its home city from May 23 - July 9, 1904.

The major characters continued to be played by Fred Stone, David Montgomery, and Anna Laughlin, while new performers took over other roles over the years.

Role	Broadway 1903	1903-1904 Touring Co A	1903-1904 Touring Co 2	Broadway / Chicago spring/summer 1904
The Scarecrow	Fred Stone	Fred Stone	Bert Swor	Fred Stone
The Tin Woodman	David C. Montgomery	David C. Montgomery	John Swor	David C. Montgomery
Dorothy Gale	Anna Laughlin	Anna Laughlin	Isabelle D'Armond	Anna Laughlin
Pastoria	Gilbert Clayton Owen Westford	Owen Westford	Arthur Larkin	??
Tryxie Tryfle	Grace Kimball Lotta Faust	Lotta Faust	Madge Ryan Carolyn Huestice	Lotta Faust
The Wizard of Oz	Bobby Gaylor James Wesley	James Wesley	Daniel Barrett William Barry	Charles Swain
Sir Dashemoff Daily [The Poet Prince]	Bessie Wynn[e] Edith Yerrington Gertrude MacKenzie	Gertrude MacKenzie	Mildred Eiaine	May De Sousa
Cynthia Cynch	Helen Byron Jeannette Lowrie Allene Crater	Allene Crater	May Taylor	Allene Crater
The Witch of the North	Edith Hutchins	Edith Hutchins	??	Albertine Benson
Imogene	Edwin J. Stone Joseph Schrode	Joseph Schrode	L. J. Wyckoff	Joseph Schrode
The Cowardly Lion	Arthur Hill	Arthur Hill	C. Ray Wallace	Arthur Hill
Sir Wiley Gyle	Stephen Maley	Stephen Maley	??	Stephen Maley

== National touring companies, 1904 to 1906 ==
Starting in August 1904 both the "A" and "2" companies were touring full time, although they did return to New York's Academy of Music at 14th and Irving Place for the Holiday season (November 7 - December 31). Company A tended to have week-long engagements in large cities, while Company 2 tended to have 1-3 day engagements in smaller cities and towns. As interest in the show slowly began to wane, both companies took an extended summer break from April -September 1905. By 1906, two companies were no longer required and Company 2 disbanded on February 28, 1906. Montgomery and Stone announced that they were moving on to other work at the end of the season (May 1906). Although Company A resumed touring in August, by November the Producer felt the show had run its course and put it up the rights for auction after the November 9, 1906 performance. The highest bidder was Hurtig & Seamon.

Performers changed more frequently during this period, sometimes multiple times in a single season, as shown in the table below. In a few cases, the performers names are not yet identified.

Role	1904–1905 Touring Co A	1904–1905 Touring Co 2	1905–1906 Touring Co A Touring Co 2	1905–1906 Touring Co 2	Aug – Nov 1906 Touring Co A
The Scarecrow	Fred Stone	Bert Swor	Fred Stone	Bert Swor	George Stone
The Tin Woodman	David C. Montgomery	John Swor	David C. Montgomery	John Swor	Fred Nice
Dorothy Gale	Anna Laughlin	Blanche Powell Todd	Mabel Barrison Netta Vesta Mona Desmond	Blanche Powell Todd	Anna Wilks
Pastoria	??	Lute Vhroman	Charles E. Mitchell	Lute Vhroman	??
Tryxie Tryfle	Virginia Levick	Florence Lee Florence Sinnot	Marion Stanley	Mildred Lee	Nellie Nice
The Wizard of Oz	??	John Mayer	James Wesley	Daniel Barrett	Charles E. Mitchell?
Sir Dashemoff Daily [The Poet Prince]	??	Mildred Elaine	Virginia Foltz Helena May	??	Ethel Green
Cynthia Cynch	Allene Crater	May Taylor	Allene Crater	Eulalie Jensen	Rosa Gore
The Witch of the North	Albertine Benson	??	Lenore Stevens Therese Von Brune	Vera Stacey	Frances Lears
Imogene	Joseph Schrode	L. J. Wyckoff	Joseph Schrode	Fred Woodward	Joseph Schrode
The Cowardly Lion	Arthur Hill	Fred Woodward	George Ramsa	Joe A West	??
Sir Wiley Gyle	Stephen Maley	??	George B. Field	??	??

== The final years, 1906 to 1909 ==
The Hurtig & Seamon show started its tour almost immediately, with the first show starting in New York City on December 9, 1906 at the Yorkville Theater. Although little information for this partial season is available, it seems that much of the cast would have been retained due to the limited preparation time (see table). One exception was that the role of Dorothy was taken over by Minerva Coverdale. The show continued to tour under the new management for another two seasons before finally closing for good in February, 1909.

Role	1906–1907 Hurtig & Seamon	1907–1908 Hurtig & Seamon	1908–1909 Hurtig & Seamon
The Scarecrow	George Stone	George Stone	George Stone
The Tin Woodman	Fred Nice Irving Christian	Frank Wilkins Charles Wilkins	William Baker
Dorothy Gale	Minerva Coverdale	Minerva Coverdale	Beatrice Turner
Pastoria	??	James Wilson	??
Tryxie Tryfle	??	Gertrude Barthold	Gertrude Barthold
The Wizard of Oz	??	Willam Barry	James Wesley
Sir Dashemoff Daily [The Poet Prince]	??	Hattie Simms McCarthy	Edith Millward
Cynthia Cynch	??	Lillian English Mildred Barry	Zoa Mathews
The Witch of the North	??	Myrtle Owens	Jesse Willard
Imogene	Joseph Schrode	Joseph Schrode	Joseph Schrode
The Cowardly Lion	??	Robert Burns	Robert Burns
Sir Wiley Gyle	??	??	??

== Reception ==
The critic of The New York Times described the show as "the Darling of Mr. Belasco's Gods". Leone Langdon-Key loved the scenery, but found Baum's script commonplace, commenting that many lines start with, "Well, wouldn't that..." and deplored Tietjens's "fondness for a lack of contrast and rhythms".

Grand Duke Boris Vladimirovich of Russia gained considerable notoriety by drinking champagne from the satin slipper of one of the chorus girls during a 1902 trip to Chicago.

== Sequel ==
The success of the play led Baum to write The Marvelous Land of Oz after four years of demand for a sequel to the novel. He dedicated the book to Montgomery and Stone, and made the roles of the Scarecrow and Tin Woodman prominent, with the roles of Dorothy and the Cowardly Lion reduced to a reminiscence. After the team balked at leaving Wizard for a sequel, Baum wrote the stage musical, The Woggle-Bug, eliminating the Tin Woodman, replacing the Scarecrow with Regent Sir Richard Spud, replacing Glinda with Maetta from The Magical Monarch of Mo and renaming the Emerald City the "City of Jewels", though Oz is mentioned several times. The first appearance of the title character was moved from halfway through the novel to the opening scene, and his mentor, Professor Knowitall, name shortened to Professor Knowitt, was raised to the level of romantic lead with a girlfriend named Prissy Pring, a Captain in General Jinjur's Army of Revolt. Jack Pumpkinhead and The Woggle-Bug became a comic team analogous to the Scarecrow and Tin Woodman. The play was performed at the Garrick Theater in Chicago and opened to reviews panning Baum's script and praising the score by Frederic Chapin. No songs were interpolated (although two were derived from an earlier source and erroneously credited to Baum), but the general consensus was that the play was a cash-in or rip-off of The Wizard of Oz rather than a sequel.

== Post-World War II revivals ==
In 1945, Milwaukee Civic Light Opera Company produced the Witmark rental version which includes Harburg/Arlen songs from the 1939 MGM movie.

In 1946, the Witmark rental version was produced by Milwaukee Civic Light Opera Company & John McCormick's company (in England) which incorporates elements and songs of the 1939 MGM movie version.

In 1949 the Denis DuFor for the Louisville Park Theatrical Association produced the Muny version of Oz and included songs from the 1902 musical.

In 1952, at the State Fair Auditorium in Texas, a version was produced with music by Tietjens, Sloane, Arlen, Harburg, and Gabrielson.

Loretto Academy produced the show in 1952 with songs from the MGM movie.

The musical was performed in a concert version in New York City's Alma Gluck Recital Hall in May 1982 by the New Amsterdam Theatre Company.

It was revived in Tarpon Springs, Florida by the New Century Opera Company in 1998, 2006, and 2007. The version was adapted by Constantine Grame who is now the Executive & Artistic Director at New Century Opera Company.

The Canton Comic Opera Company, a community theatre company in Canton, Ohio, performed a version in July 2010. It was done with a 28-piece orchestra and a cast of 50. It was adapted, directed, and conducted by Joseph N. Rubin.

In 2016 a Swedish production was produced called "Trollkarlen av Oz" and adapted and directed by Dick Lundberg, who also played the Scarecrow and Sir Wiley Gyle.

In August 2023 Offsite Connecticut Theatre produced a fully costumed staged reading of the show. T. Craft adapted and directed the show. She also starred as Dorothy, Tryxie, and some chorus roles.

Another concert version was performed by Offsite Connecticut Theatre in January 2025.

== Music ==
The following table lists all musical numbers included over the years in the 1902 Wizard of Oz production. Most of this information is found (in a more descriptive, chronological format) in the book Oz before the Rainbow, by Mark Evan Swartz. This and other references are provided citations in the column header, and then simply named in the individual rows. Some of the music was known even beyond the United States. During the Baums' 1906 stay at Shepheard's Hotel in Cairo, Egypt, a Hungarian Gypsy Band played songs from the musical in their honor.

Much of what is known has come from surviving scripts and show programs which are not comprehensive, resulting in gaps. In particular, the musical numbers from 1906 - 1909 are not well documented.

Index	Act	Title	Lyricist	Composer	Character	Dates	Notes	Sheet music publisher/date	References Swartz 1902 program 1903 script Recording
01.1	1	Instrumental Introduction: Prelude	N/A	Paul Tietjens	N/A	1902 - 1909			1902 program
01.2	1	Overture [Selection]	N/A	Paul Tietjens	N/A	1909 -	Tietjens Instrumentals: Opening Prayer (Transformation); Phantom Patrol; Just a Simple Girl From the Prairie; Poppy Song; Love is Love; When We Get What's A'Coming to Us; The Traveler and the Pie; When You Love, Love, Love; Rejoice, The Wizard is No Longer King.	M. Witmark & Sons (1902)	Swartz
02	1	Instrumental Introduction: [Farm] Life in Kansas	N/A	Paul Tietjens	Dorothy Chorus	1902 - 1909			1902 Program, Swartz
03	1	Instrumental Introduction: Cyclone	N/A	Paul Tietjens	Chorus	1902 - 1909			1902 Program, Swartz
04	1	Instrumental Introduction: Transformation	N/A	Paul Tietjens	N/A	1902 - 1909			1902 Program; Recording
05	1	Instrumental Introduction: Maypole Dance	N/A	Paul Tietjens	Chorus	1902 - 1909	Cut for the Jan 1903 New York opening		1902 Program, 1903 Script, Swartz
06	1	Instrumental Introduction: Death of the Wicked Witch	N/A	Paul Tietjens	Chorus	1902 - 1909			1902 Program
07	1	Instrumental Introduction: Locusta's Entrance	N/A	Paul Tietjens	Locusta Chorus	1902 - 1909			1902 Program
08	1	Niccolo's Piccolo	L. Frank Baum Glen MacDonough	Paul Tietjens A. Baldwin Sloane	Cynthia	1902 - 1906+		Publisher? (1902)	1902 Program, 1903 Script, Swartz
09.1	1	In Michigan	Glen MacDonough	A. Baldwin Sloane	Pastoria Chorus	1902 - 1904	Replaced for the Mar 1904 Edition De Luxe		1902 Program, 1903 Script, Swartz
09.2	1	The Tale of a Cassowary	Will D. Cobb	Gus Edwards	Cynthia	1904 - 1905	Added for the Mar 1904 Edition De Luxe Replaced for the 1905 touring season	Shapiro, Remick, and Co. (1904)	Swartz
09.3	1	The Tale of a Monkey	Vincent P. Bryan	Leo Edwards	Cynthia	1905 - 1906	Added for the 1905 touring season		Swartz
09.4	1	The Bullfrog and the Coon	Felix F. Feist	Joseph S. Nathan	Cynthia	1905 - 1906		Leo Feist (1906)	Recording
09.5	1	Pocahontas	Vincent P. Bryan	Gus Edwards	Cynthia	1907 - 1908			Recording
10.1	1	The Man Who Stays in Town	Glen MacDonough	A. Baldwin Sloane	Pastoria Tryxie	1902	Cut in the show's third week to reduce length of show (Attribution to MacDonough is unconfirmed and uncredited)		Swartz
10.2	1	When the Circus Comes to Town	Robert J. Adams	James O'Dea	Pastoria Tryxie	1903 - 1904	Added for the Jan 1903 New York opening	Sol Bloom (1902)	1903 Script, Swartz
10.3	1	Daisy Donahue	Robert J. Adams	James O'Dea	Pastoria Tryxie	1903 - 1904	Replaced for the Mar 1904 Edition De Luxe		Recording
10.4	1	Down on the Brandywine	Vincent P. Bryan	J. B. Mullen	Pastoria Tryxie	1904 - 1906	Added for the Mar 1904 Edition De Luxe	Shapiro, Remick, and Co. (1904)	Swartz; Recording
11.1	1	Carrie Barry [Won't You Marry Me?]	L. Frank Baum	Paul Tietjens A. Baldwin Sloane	Dorothy Chorus	1902 - 1906			1902 Program, 1903 Script, Swartz
11.2	1	Come Take a Skate With Me	R. A. Browne	Gus Edwards	Dorothy	1907 - 1908	Originally sung in His Honor, the Mayor (1906)		Recording
12	1	Alas for the Man Without Brains [The Scarecrow]	L. Frank Baum	Paul Tietjens	Scarecrow	1902 - 1906		M. Witmark & Sons (1902)	1902 Program, 1903 Script, Swartz
13.1	1	Love is Love [Ballad Romanza]	L. Frank Baum	Paul Tietjens	Sir Daily	1902	Replaced in Aug 1902	M. Witmark & Sons (1902)	1902 Program, Swartz; Recording
13.2	1	As Long as There's Love in the World	Vincent P. Bryan? James O'Dea?	Leo Edwards? Edward Hutchinson?	Sir Daily	1902	Starting Aug 1902, replaced for the Jan 1903 New York opening		
13.3	1	That is Love [That Must Be Love]	Maurice Steinberg	Maurice Steinberg	Sir Daily	1903 - 1906	Added for the Jan 1903 New York opening. Except May - Jul 1904	"Songs Sung in Hamlin and Mitchell's Musical Extravaganza The Wizard of Oz" M. Witmark & Sons (1903)	1903 Script, Swartz
13.4	1	Only You	Frank Keesee	Charles A. Zimmermann	Sir Daily	1904	May - Jul 1904	Leo Feist (1906)	Swartz
13.5	1	I Love You All the Time	Will R. Anderson	Will R. Anderson	Sir Daily	1903 - 1904?	By Dec 1904		Swartz; Recording
14.1	1	Mary Canary	Edward P. Moran	Seymour Furth	Sir Daily	1904	Added for the Mar 1904 Edition De Luxe Replaced May 1904		Swartz
14.2	1	When the Heart is Sad	Hollister	Charles A. Zimmermann	Sir Daily	1904 - 1905	May - Sep 1904		Swartz
14.3	1	The Moon Has His Eyes on You	Billy Johnson	Albert Von Tilzer	Sir Daily	1904 - 1906	Starting Sep 1904		Recording
15.1	1	When You Love, Love, Love	L. Frank Baum	Paul Tietjens	Scarecrow Tin Man Dorothy	1902 - 1906		M. Witmark & Sons (1902) "Songs Sung in Hamlin and Mitchell's Musical Extravaganza The Wizard of Oz" M. Witmark & Sons (1903)	1902 Program; 1903 Script; Swartz; Recording
15.2	1	When You Love, Love Love [Schottische]	N/A	Paul Tietjens	Scarecrow Tin Man Dorothy	1902 - 1904?		M. Witmark & Sons (1902)	1902 Program
16	1	Poppy Song [Poppy Chorus]	L. Frank Baum	Paul Tietjens	Chorus	1902 - 1906		M. Witmark & Sons (1902) "Songs Sung in Hamlin and Mitchell's Musical Extravaganza The Wizard of Oz" M. Witmark & Sons (1903)	1902 Program; 1903 Script; Swartz; Recording
17	1	Act 1 Finale: Invocation and Death of Poppies	N/A	Paul Tietjens	Ensamble	1902			1902 Program
18	1	Act 1 Finale: Transformation	N/A	Paul Tietjens	Ensamble	1902			1902 Program
19	1	Act 1 Finale: Winter Jubilation	N/A	Paul Tietjens	Ensamble	1902 - 1906?			1902 Program
20	2	The Guardian of the Gate	L. Frank Baum	Paul Tietjens	Private Gruph	1902	Cut in the show's first week to reduce length of show	M. Witmark & Sons (1902)	Swartz
21	2	Hayfoot, Strawfoot	N/A	Paul Tietjens	Chorus	1902			1902 Program, Swartz
22	2	When We Get What's A'Coming to Us	L. Frank Baum	Paul Tietjens	Scarecrow Tin Man Dorothy	1902		M. Witmark & Sons (1902)	1902 Program; Swartz; Recording
23	2	The Phantom Patrol	N/A	Paul Tietjens	Chorus	1902 - 1906		M. Witmark & Sons (1902)	Swartz; Recording
24.1	2	Mr Dooley	William Jerome	Jean Schwartz	Wizard	1902	Originally sung in A Chinese Honeymoon (1902)	Shapiro, Bernstein & Von Tilzer (1902)	1902 Program; Swartz; Recording
24.2	2	On a Pay Night Evening	John W. West	Bruno Schilinski	Wizard Chorus	1903, 1904	Replaced in Jan 1904, but reinstated Jun 1904		1903 Script; Swartz
24.3	2	The Tale of a Shirt [The Tale of the Red Shirt]	W. W. Brackett	Lottie L. Meda	Wizard	1904	Added Jan 1904, Replaced Jun 1904	M. Witmark & Sons (1904)	Swartz
24.4	2	Mrs. O'Harahan	Harold Atteridge	Bert Peters	Wizard	1905 - 1906		Victor Kremer Co (1905)	
24.5	2	Julie Dooley	Frank R. Adams Will M. Hough	Joseph E. Howard	Wizard	1905 - 1906	Originally sung in His Highness the Bey (1904) Added for the 1905 touring season		Swartz; Recording
24.6	2	Meet Me Down At the Corner	Will D. Cobb	Harry Hoyt	Wizard	1907?			Recording
24.7	2	Budweiser's a Friend of Mine	Vincent P. Bryan	Seymour Furth	Wizard	c. 1908	Originally sung in Ziegfeld Follies of 1907		Recording
25.1	2	The Witch Behind the Moon	Charles Albert	Louis Weslyn	Cynthia Chorus	1902 - 1903		M. Witmark & Sons (1902)	1902 Program; Swartz; Recording (noted)
25.2	2	There's a Lot of Things You Never Learn in School	Ed Gardenier	Edwin S. Brill	Cynthia	1903 - 1904		Doty & Brill (1902)	Recording
25.3	2	Twas Enough to Make a Perfect Lady Mad	Vincent P. Bryan	J. B. Mullen	Cynthia	1904 - 1906		Shapiro, Remick, and Co. (1904)	
26	2	The Different Ways of Making Love	L. Frank Baum	Nathaniel D. Mann	Dorothy Cynthia	1902	Cut in June 1902	M. Witmark & Sons (1902)	Swartz
27.1	2	Sammy	James O'Dea	Edward Hutchinson	Tryxie	1902 - 1905		Sol Bloom (1902) "Songs Sung in Hamlin and Mitchell's Musical Extravaganza The Wizard of Oz" M. Witmark & Sons (1903)	1902 Program; 1903 Script; Swartz; Recording
27.2	2	Johnnie, I'll Take You	Will D. Cobb	Gus Edwards	Tryxie	1904 - 1905		Shapiro, Remick, and Co. (1904)	
27.3	2	The Tale of a Stroll	George Totten Smith	Byrd Dougherty Benjamin M. Jerome	Tryxie	1905 - 1906	Added for the 1905 touring season	Charles K. Harris (1905)	Swartz; Recording
27.4		Johnnie Morgan	Harry Williams	Egbert Van Alstyne	Tryxie	1904?		Shapiro, Remick, and Co. (1904)	
27.5	2	Can't You See I'm Lonely	Felix F. Feist	Harry Armstrong	Tryxie	1905 - 1906		Leo Feist (1905)	Recording
27.6	2	Are You Sincere?	Alfred Bryan	Albert Gumble	Tryxie	1908 - 1909 ?	Later parodied by Nat M. Wills as "Are Youse in Here?" on Victor 5613.		Recording
28	2	The Dance of All Nations: Connemara Christening	Edgar Smith	A. Baldwin Sloane	Tin Man	1902 - 1906			1902 Program; 1903 Script; Swartz
29.1	2	The Dance of All Nations: Spanish Bolero	Edgar Smith	A. Baldwin Sloane	Scarecrow	1902 - 1904			1902 Program; 1903 Script; Swartz
29.2	2	Good Bye, Fedora	Harry H. Williams	Robert J. Adams	Scarecrow	1904 - 1905		Shapiro, Remick, and Co. (1904)	Recording
29.3	2	Sitting Bull	Vincent P. Bryan	Charles A. Zimmermann	Scarecrow Chorus	1905 - 1906	Added for the 1905 touring season		Swartz; Recording
29.4	2	Green Corn Dance	Vincent P. Bryan	Charles A. Zimmermann?	Scarecrow Chorus	1905 - 1906	Added for the 1905 touring season		Swartz
30	2	The Dance of All Nations: Wee Highland Mon	Edgar Smith	A. Baldwin Sloane	Wizard	1902 - ?			1902 Program; 1903 Script; Swartz
31.1	2	The Dance of All Nations: Rosalie [My Royal Rosie]	Will D. Cobb	Gus Edwards	Dorothy Cynthia	1902 - 1904	Replaced in Jan 1904, but reinstated Jun 1904. Originally a duet, later became a solo for Dorothy	F. A. Mills (date?)	1902 Program; 1903 Script; Swartz; Recording (noted)
31.2	2	Under a Panama	Vincent P. Bryan	J. B. Mullen	Dorothy	1904	Added Jan 1904, Replaced Jun 1904 Also featured in Sergeant Brue (1904) and mentioned in Sally Benson's novel Meet Me in St. Louis	Shapiro, Remick, and Co. (1903)	Swartz; Recording
31.3	2	An Afternoon Tea	Edgar Smith	A. Baldwin Sloane	Dorothy Scarecrow Tin Man	1904			Recording (noted)
32.1	2	I Love Only One Girl in the Wide, Wide World	Will D. Cobb	Gus Edwards	Sir Daily	1903 - 1904		F. A. Mills (1903)	Recording
32.2	2	I Never Loved a Love as I Love You [I'll Never Love Another Love Like I Love You]	Will D. Cobb	Gus Edwards	Sir Daily	1904 - 1905		Shapiro, Remick, and Co. (1904)	
32.3	2	Only You	Frank Keesee	Charles A. Zimmermann	Sir Daily	1905 - 1905	Moved later in the show (see 13.4)	Leo Feist (1906)	
32.4	2	My Own Girl	Vincent P. Bryan	Leo Edwards	Sir Daily	1905 - 1906	Added for the 1905 touring season		Swartz
33.1	2	The Lobster Song [I Was Walking Round the Ocean]	Hugh Morton	Gustave Kerker	Scarecrow Tin Man	1902			1902 Program; Swartz
33.2	2	Nautical Nonsense (Hurrah for Baffin's Bay!)	Vincent P. Bryan	Theodore F. Morse	Scarecrow Tin Man Chorus	1903 - 1904	Possibly originally sung in The Girl From Up There (1901)	Howley, Haviland, & Dresser (date?)	Swartz; 1903 Script ("Specialty"); Recording
33.3	2	The Nightmare	Vincent P. Bryan	J. B. Mullen	Scarecrow Tin Man	1904 - 1906	By Dec 1904		Swartz
33.4	2	Football	Vincent P. Bryan	Charles A. Zimmermann	Scarecrow Tin Man	1905 - ?	Added for the 1905 touring season	Vincent Bryan Music Company (1905)	Swartz; Recording
34.1	2	I'd Like to Go Halves on That	David C. Montgomery	Harry Castling Frank Leo	Tin Man	1904 - 1906	By Dec 1904		Swartz; Recording
34.2	2	Marching Thro Georgia	Vincent P. Bryan	Charles A. Zimmermann	Scarecrow Tin Man	1904 - 1905			Swartz
34.3	2	Marching Through Port Arthur	Vincent P. Bryan	Charles A. Zimmermann	Scarecrow Tin Man	1905	Added for the 1905 touring season		Swartz
35.1	2	Act 2 Finale: Waltz and Grand March	N/A	Paul Tietjens	Chorus				
35.1	2	Act 2 Finale: Rejoice, The Wizard is No Longer King	L. Frank Baum	Paul Tietjens	Ensemble	1902	Section from the Finale published as "Just a Simple Girl from the Prairie"	M. Witmark & Sons (1902)	1902 Program; Swartz; Recording
35.1	2	Act 2 Finale: Star of My Native Land	Glen MacDonough	A. Baldwin Sloane	Pastoria Chorus	1903			1903 Script
36	3	Cooks and Waitresses Number [March]	N/A	Charles A. Zimmermann	Chorus	1903			1903 Script
37	3	Opening Chorus	Glen MacDonough	A. Baldwin Sloane	Chorus	1903	Cut in Mar 1903		
38	3	I'll Be Your Honey in The Springtime	Harry Freeman	Harry Freeman	Dorothy Chorus	1902		M. Witmark & Sons (1902)	1902 Program; Swartz
39	3	She Really Didn't Mind the Thing At All	John Slavin	Nathaniel D. Mann	Wizard	1902	Cut Jun 1902	M. Witmark & Sons (1902)	Swartz
40.1	3	That's Where She Sits All Day [Cockney Coon Song]	Frank Leo	Frank Leo	Scarecrow Tin Man	1902 - 1908		T. B. Harms & Co	1902 Program; 1903 Script; Swartz; Recording
40.2	3	Blooming Lize	Matt C. Woodward	Benjamin M. Jerome	Scarecrow Tin Man	1902	August 1902 Originally sung in The Chaperons (1902)		
40.3	3	Pimlico Malinda	James O'Dea	Robert J. Adams	Scarecrow Tin Man	1903	Replaced in Jan 1903		
40.4	3	Must You?	Harry Boden David C. Montgomery	Bert Brantford	Scarecrow Tin Man	1903	Jan 1903 (several weeks after opening)	M. Witmark & Sons (1903) "Songs Sung in Hamlin and Mitchell's Musical Extravaganza The Wizard of Oz" M. Witmark & Sons (1903)	1903 Script
41	3	The Traveller and the Pie	L. Frank Baum	Paul Tietjens	Scarecrow Chorus	1902 - 1906	Intermittently used	M. Witmark & Sons (1902) "Songs Sung in Hamlin and Mitchell's Musical Extravaganza The Wizard of Oz" M. Witmark & Sons (1903)	1902 Program; 1903 Script; Swartz; Recording
42.1	3	Honey, My Sweet	Henry M. Blossom Jr.	George A. Spink	Dorothy Chorus	1903			1903 Script
42.2	3	The Sweetest Girl in Dixie	Robert J. Adams	James O'Dea	Dorothy	1904 - 1905	Originally sung in Sergeant Brue (1904)	Jerome H. Remick & Co (1903)	Recording
42.3	3	Fraidy Cat	James A. Brennan	James A. Brennan	Dorothy	1911		O'Neill & Story (1912)	
43	3	Finale [All Aboard for Sunny Kansas]	L. Frank Baum? Glen MacDonough?	Paul Tietjens? A. Baldwin Sloane?	Ensemble	1902			1902 Program; 1903 Script; Swartz
??		March	N/A	Paul Tietjens		1902?		M. Witmark & Sons (1902)	
??		Waltzes	N/A	Paul Tietjens		1902?		M. Witmark & Sons (1902)	
??		Waltz and Grand March	NA	Paul Tietjens		1902?			
??		Lanciers	N/A	Paul Tietjens		1902?		M. Witmark & Sons (1902)	
??		It Happens Ev'ry Day	L. Frank Baum	Nathaniel D. Mann	Cynthia Pastoria Wizard	1902	Cut to reduce length of show. Possibly performed between "The Different Ways of Making Love" and "Sammy"	M. Witmark & Sons (1902)	
??		How'd You Like to Like a Girl Like Me	Felix F. Feist	Jos S. Nathan	Dorothy?	1906		Leo Feist (1906)	
??		It's Lovely to Love a Lovely Girl	Edward P. Moran	Seymour Furth	Dorothy?	1903 - 1904??		"Songs Sung in Hamlin and Mitchell's Musical Extravaganza The Wizard of Oz" M. Witmark & Sons (1903) M. Witmark & Sons (1904)	
??		Nemo and his Bear	Al. Gumble	Dave J. Clark	Dorothy Chorus	1907	Mentioned in contemporary article in Omaha Daily Bee, Sep 8, 1907.	Jerome H. Remick & Co	

== See also ==
- The Wizard of Oz adaptations, other adaptations of The Wonderful Wizard of Oz
