= Oz Before the Rainbow =

2000 book written by Mark Evan Swartz

Oz Before the Rainbow is a book written by Mark Evan Swartz in 2000 chronicling the early stage and film versions of The Wizard of Oz, before the 1939 movie, as well as an album featuring music from the early stage versions.

Half of the book is devoted to the 1902 stage musical of The Wizard of Oz that Baum adapted from his book, with substantial revisions by the director and producer. The adaptation was a tremendous success, first in Chicago, then on Broadway, where it ran for two years, and then on tour for an additional seven years. It starred the comedy team of David C. Montgomery and Fred Stone as the Tin Woodman and the Scarecrow. The production was a lavish extravaganza. Swartz explores how this production influenced stage and film adaptations that followed, including the 1939 MGM movie.

The book also discusses Baum's 1908 Fairylogue and Radio-Plays, a presentation narrated by Baum, involving live action, slides and silent film, which included stories from Baum's original book and from its first two sequels, The Marvelous Land of Oz and Ozma of Oz. Among other adaptations, the book also discusses the 1910, 1914 and 1925 silent film adaptations (the latter with Oliver Hardy as the Tin Woodman), some of which used material from other Oz books. In 1913, another stage version, adapted from Ozma of Oz was The Tik-Tok Man of Oz, which itself was adapted into Tik-Tok of Oz. The book contains numerous illustrations, advertisements, photos from many of the versions, program covers, posters and sheet music. It goes into great detail about performers, staging and designs. The book notes that, despite many attempts, Baum was unable to repeat the extraordinary stage success of the 1902 musical and its revivals, although some of the adaptations were then turned into successful novels. He notes, however, that the various versions influenced each other and led to the 1939 MGM movie.

== Reception ==
A review in Variety found that the "archival history is zealously researched, but rather short on insight... The book’s chapters read more like an annotated research file than a finished study." In Utopian Studies, Andrew Karp wrote that the book describes the 1902 play's history and success "in mind-numbing detail", and wishes that the author had discussed the musical in the context of other children's plays of the time, like Peter Pan or Toad of Toad Hall.
