= The Wonderful Wizard of Oz (1910 film) =

1910 American silent fantasy film by Otis Turner

- 13-minute film clip
- Directed by: Otis Turner (unconfirmed)
- Screenplay by: Otis Turner (unconfirmed)
- Based on: The Wonderful Wizard of Oz by L. Frank Baum
- Produced by: William Selig
- Starring: Bebe Daniels
- Distributed by: Selig Polyscope Company
- Release date: March 24, 1910
- Running time: 13 minutes
- Country: United States
- Languages: Silent film English intertitles

The Wonderful Wizard of Oz, also known as The Wizard of Oz, is a 1910 American silent fantasy film and the earliest surviving film version of L. Frank Baum's 1900 novel The Wonderful Wizard of Oz. The film was made by the Selig Polyscope Company without Baum's direct input. It was created to fulfill a contractual obligation associated with Baum's personal bankruptcy caused by the failure of his theatrical production The Fairylogue and Radio-Plays. It was partly based on the 1902 stage musical The Wizard of Oz, though much of the film deals with the Wicked Witch of the West like character, who does not appear in the musical.

It was the beginning of a series of film sequels, also released in 1910 and based on Baum's books, but the sequels are thought to be lost films.

== Plot ==
Dorothy Gale and Imogene the Cow are chased by Hank the Mule on their farm. Dorothy runs to a cornfield and discovers that the family Scarecrow is alive. They realize a cyclone is approaching, so they all hide in a haystack. Dorothy and Toto, Hank, Imogene, and the Scarecrow are all swept to the Land of Oz, where soldiers are scared away by the Witch Momba, who attacks the Wizard of Oz due to his threat to her reign. As Dorothy plays with Toto, the good Witch Glinda changes Toto into a real protector. Dorothy then encounters the Cowardly Lion, and they encounter the Rusty Woodman and oil his joints. The children meet Eureka the Cat. The Witch kidnaps and imprisons the children. Dorothy throws water on the Witch Momba, killing her and allowing the gang to rescue the animals. Dorothy and her friends arrive at the Emerald City. The citizens dance, and the Scarecrow reads a note that says the Wizard has declared him king, and the whole thing ends in a celebratory dance.

== Cast ==
The credits to the film list Hobart Bosworth, Eugenie Besserer, Robert Leonard, Bebe Daniels, Winifred Greenwood, Lillian Leighton and Olive Cox as the performers, and Otis Turner as director.

The cast list does not indicate which characters each credited actor portrayed. In his book Oz Before the Rainbow: L. Frank Baum's The Wonderful Wizard of Oz Stage and Screen to 1939, Oz scholar Mark Evan Swartz concludes that Daniels, who was eight or nine years old at the time of filming, played Dorothy, and that Bosworth and Leonard likely played the Scarecrow and Tin Woodman, respectively. He takes no position on the rest of the cast assignments.

== Production history ==
The character Imogene the Cow did not appear in the novel. She replaced Toto the dog in the stage musical. Many of the costumes and much of the make-up in this film, though not the Tin Woodman's, resemble those used in the 1902 Broadway musical, The Wizard of Oz. None of the songs in the stage show were sung in the famous 1939 film. The presence of Eureka the kitten is drawn from the commingling of material from The Marvelous Land of Oz and Dorothy and the Wizard in Oz; Eureka appears in the latter novel.

Long thought to be culled from footage from The Fairylogue and Radio-Plays (a feature length stage and film show created and presented by Baum in 1908), this was proven not to be the case when the film was recovered. Although the only known Fairylogue film footage has decomposed (and the interactive nature of the presentation makes the discovery of another print unlikely), the slides, script, and production stills are available (and many have been reprinted in books and magazines) and clearly from another production, which emphasized material from Ozma of Oz that the descriptions of the Selig films imply was ignored. This film, and its sequels, were created in the wake of Baum's loss of the rights to The Wonderful Wizard of Oz and temporary licensing rights on The Marvelous Land of Oz and John Dough and the Cherub.

== Other adaptations ==
The Wonderful Wizard of Oz was later followed by the sequels Dorothy and the Scarecrow in Oz, The Land of Oz, and John Dough and the Cherub. All three were produced in 1910 and are all considered to be lost films.

== Sequels ==
The Selig Polyscope sequels are known only from their catalog descriptions, derived from press releases printed in The Moving Picture World and The Film Index:

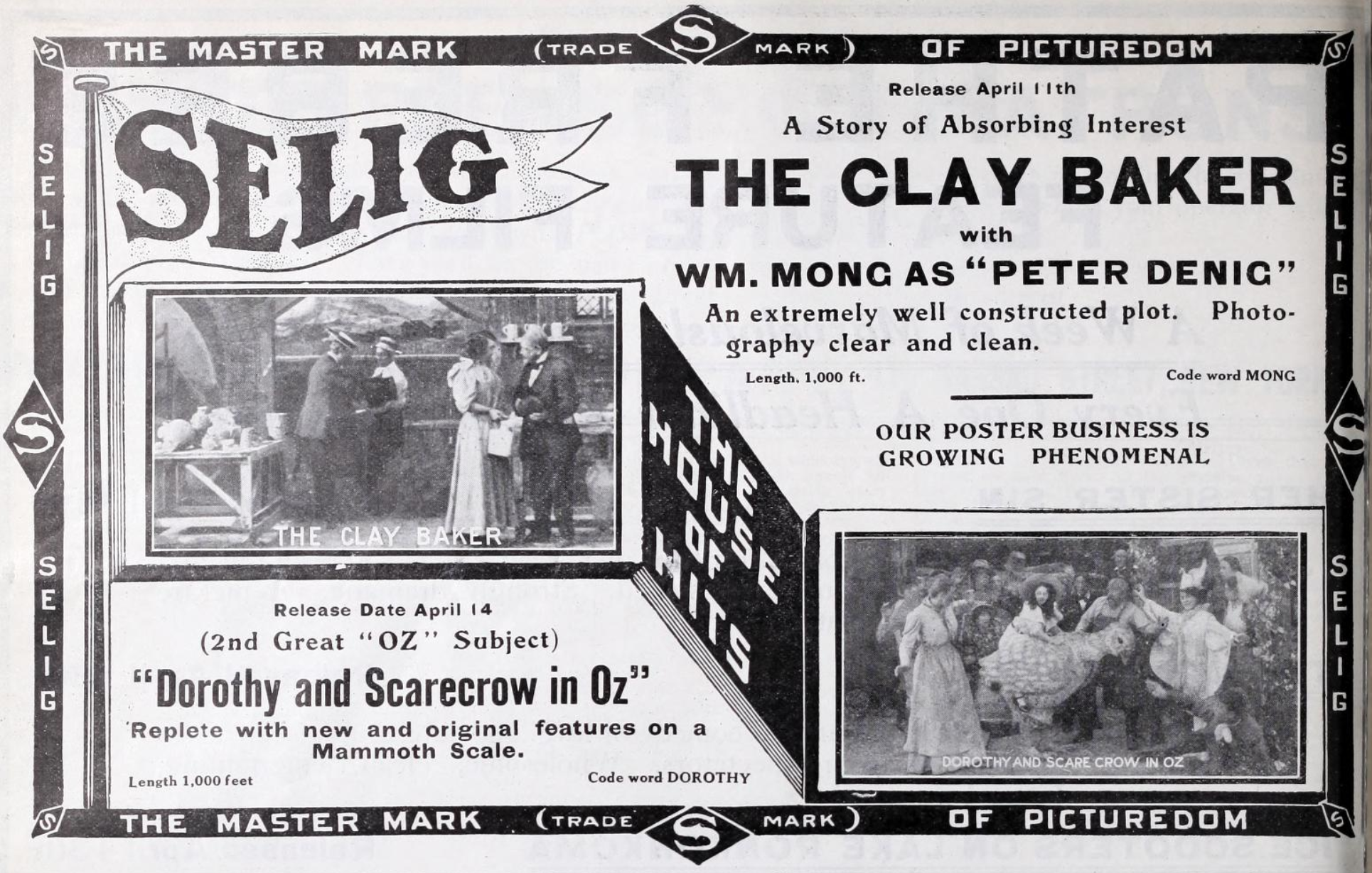
Selig Polyscope Co. film ad for "Dorothy and [the] Scarecrow in Oz" and "The Clay Baker" (April 1910)

=== Dorothy and the Scarecrow in Oz ===
Dorothy and the Scarecrow are now in the Emerald City. They have become friends with the Wizard, and together with the woodman, the cowardly lion, and several new creations equally delightful, they journey through Oz -- the earthquake -- and into the glass city. The Scarecrow is elated to think he is going to get his brains at last and be like other men are; the Tin-Woodman is bent upon getting a heart, and the cowardly lion pleads with the great Oz for courage. All these are granted by his Highness. Dorothy picks the princess. -- The Dangerous Mangaboos. -- Into the black pit, and out again. We then see Jim, the cab horse, and myriads of pleasant surprises that hold and fascinate.

=== The Land of Oz ===
The Emerald City in all its splendor with all the familiar characters so dear to the hearts of children - Dorothy, the scarecrow, the woodman, the cowardly lion, and the wizard continuing on their triumphal entry to the mystic city, adding new characters, new situations, and scintillating comedy. Dorothy, who has so won her way into the good graces of lovers of fairy folk, finds new encounters in the rebellion army of General Jinger [sic] showing myriads of Leith soldiers in glittering apparel forming one surprise after the other, until the whole resolves itself into a spectacle worthy of the best artists in picturedom. Those who have followed the two preceding pictures of this great subject cannot but appreciate "The Land of Oz," the crowning effort of the Oz series.

=== John Dough and the Cherub ===
The prophecy is fulfilled and John Dough becomes the King of Lo-Hi. As King of the Lowlanders and Highlanders he assumes the dignified duties of a ruling monarch but with no degree of satisfaction to his adherents or happiness to himself, as the evil spirit of the witches and trend of natural events strew with shagged breakers the paths of the "ship of state"--the alchemist entrusts his wonderful elixir of life to the Baker woman for safekeeping, who, being color blind mistakes the precious elixir for a rheumatism cure and the application has startling effects. Neglecting to dispose of the contents of the bowl--same [sic] finds its way into Baker's bread and the result almost proves the undoing of Lo-Hi-John Dough gives his assistance in the celebration of the 4th. No end of trouble results from the invasion of his peaceful rest by the much despised Miffkits--then comes the cherub who introduces Dough to his animal friends, incidentally secures supplies. He then visits the fairies' garden and later interviews the Princess Ozma who makes a prophecy--"The Throne of Lo-Hi shall vacant be until the coming by air or sea of an oven baked man and a Cherub wee." Accordingly John Dough drops into the Land of Oz, and meets the Cherub. Through their companionship then we see them encountering the tempestuous seas of frills and pains alike and the completion of the weird and wonderful fairy tale of the Kingly rulers of Lo-Hi.

== Home media ==
The film is included in the 3-disc DVD set More Treasures from American Film Archives (2004), compiled by the National Film Preservation Foundation from five American film archives. This film is preserved by George Eastman House and has a running time of 13 minutes and an added piano score adapted from Paul Tietjens's music from the 1902 stage play and performed by Martin Marks. It is also included in the 3-disc edition of the 1939 film version. On this edition, John Thomas performs a compilation of Oz-related music by Louis F. Gottschalk.

== See also ==
- The Wizard of Oz adaptations — other adaptations of The Wonderful Wizard of Oz
- List of films about witchcraft
- Treasures from American Film Archives
