= Lucy Monroe =

American singer (1906–1987)

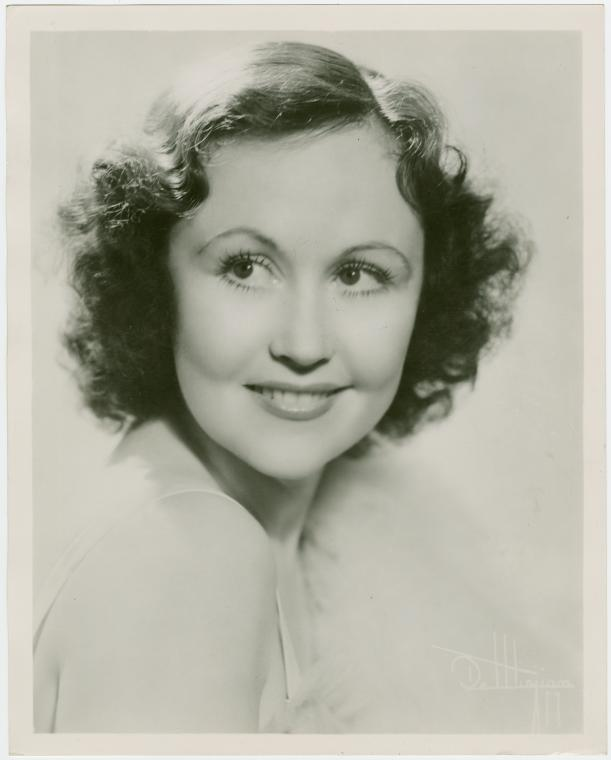

Background information
- Born: October 23, 1906; Manhattan, New York, U.S.
- Died: October 13, 1987 (aged 80); Manhattan, New York, U.S.
- Genres: Patriotic music, folk music
- Occupations: Singer; dancer
- Years active: 1925–1960s

Lucy Monroe (October 23, 1906 – October 13, 1987) was an American operatic soprano and dancer. She was noted for her performances of "The Star-Spangled Banner", the national anthem of the United States, which she performed for Presidents and at sporting and military events, which earned her the nickname of "The Star-Spangled Soprano".

== Early life ==
Monroe was born on October 23, 1906, in Manhattan, New York; she was the only child of Anna Laughlin, an actress, and Dwight Monroe, a gem merchant. Dwight met Anna when she performed the role of Dorothy Gale in the Broadway production of The Wizard of Oz. On her father's side, she was a descendant of James Monroe.

Monroe graduated from the Horace Mann School, where she was a member of the glee club. Her father did not want her to pursue a career in music, but after he died in 1925, her mother encouraged Monroe's ambitions. She pursued further studies in singing with Estelle Liebling, the voice teacher of Beverly Sills, in New York City.

== Career ==
Monroe began her career in 1925 as a dancer for the Ziegfeld Follies and also became a backup singer. In the 1930s, she appeared on The American Album of Familiar Music. NBC offered Monroe's services to the American Legion for their 1937 convention. This would be her first professional performance of "The Star-Spangled Banner", the national anthem of the United States. She sang the national anthem again at President Franklin D. Roosevelt's birthday ball at the Waldorf Astoria New York in January 1938.

Monroe became the official soloist for both the American Legion and the Veterans of Foreign Wars. She also began to perform at the Metropolitan Opera and New York Philharmonic. She was the star of The American Jubilee, a show at the 1939 New York World's Fair; each of its 650 performances ended with Monroe singing the national anthem, earning her the nicknames "The Star-Spangled Soprano" and "The Star-Spangled Banner Girl". By 1942, it was estimated that she had performed the anthem 1,500 times. In an interview with Bennett Cerf in the 1950s, she estimated that she had by then performed it over 5,000 times.

During World War II, Monroe traveled to United States Army camps on USO tours and sang at war bond rallies. She performed "The Star-Spangled Banner" with the National Symphony Orchestra at Constitution Hall in March 1941 to celebrate its 10th anniversary as the national anthem. RCA Victor named her its director of patriotic music and she embarked on a coast-to-coast tour to promote patriotic and folk music. In 1942, she led a sing-along of the national anthem with 40,000 attendees at the steps of the Lincoln Memorial. She visited Fort McHenry in September 1944 to celebrate the 130th anniversary of "The Star-Spangled Banner". Monroe sang the national anthem at the second inauguration of President Harry S. Truman in 1949. In 1958, she testified before the House Judiciary Committee that was tasked with choosing an official version of the national anthem out of the 171 on record at the Library of Congress.

Monroe sang the national anthem for Opening Day at Yankee Stadium annually from 1945 through 1960 and also at World Series games hosted at Yankee Stadium during that time. She performed the national anthem in 1949 for the unveiling of a monument to Babe Ruth in Monument Park. She also continued traveling to Europe and North Africa on United Service Organizations tours, and went to Korea in 1953. The family of Ed Barrow, former president of the New York Yankees, invited her to sing "Abide with Me" at his funeral in 1953. She also sang the national anthem at the ceremony preceding the start of the demolition of Ebbets Field on February 23, 1960.

== Personal life ==
Monroe married Harold Weinberg, an attorney, in August 1961. They were married until his death in 1977. Monroe died in Manhattan from cancer on October 13, 1987, 10 days before her 81st birthday.
