= The Winding Trail =

The Winding Trail may refer to:

- The Winding Trail (1918 film), an American Western film directed by John H. Collins
- The Winding Trail (1921 film), an American Western film directed by George Martin
