= Charles A. Zimmermann =

American composer and bandmaster

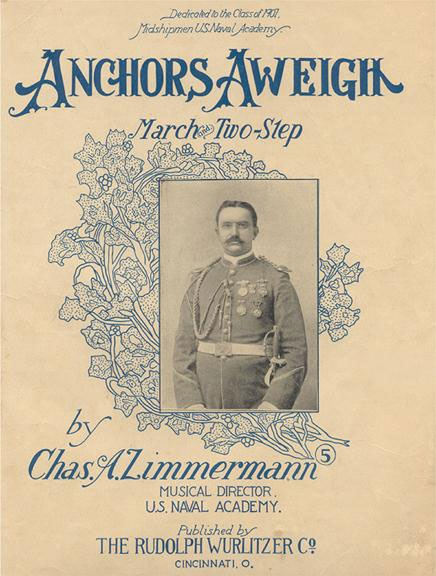
- Born: Charles Adams Zimmermann; 1861; Newport, Rhode Island, U.S.
- Died: January 16, 1916 (aged 54–55); Annapolis, Maryland, U.S.

Charles A. Zimmermann (1861 – January 16, 1916) was an American composer of marches and popular music. A graduate of the Peabody Conservatory of Music in Baltimore, he was appointed bandmaster at the United States Naval Academy in 1887 at age 26. Zimmermann served as the academy's bandmaster until his death from a brain hemorrhage in 1916. Zimmermann is buried at the Naval Academy cemetery.

Zimmermann composed his most famous march, "Anchors Aweigh", in 1906 when he was a lieutenant in the United States Navy. The lyrics were written by Alfred Hart Miles, a midshipman. The march was intended from the beginning to serve as a rousing tune for football games. The familiar strain is actually the trio of the larger work. Zimmermann also composed numerous songs for the 1902 stage play The Wizard of Oz.

== List of compositions ==
"Anchors Aweigh" (historical)
1929 acetate recording performance of "Anchors Aweigh" by the United States Navy Band.

Anchors Aweigh (modern)
An instrumental sample of a single verse of Anchors Aweigh played by a brass band.

- with Frank Keesee:
  - Only You (Sir Dashemoff Daily)
- with Mr. Hollister:
  - When the Heart is Sad (Sir Dashemoff Daily)
- with Vincent Bryan:
  - Marching Thro' Georgia (Scarecrow and Tin Woodman)
  - Sitting Bull (Scarecrow)
  - Football (Scarecrow and Tin Woodman)
  - Marching Through Port Arthur (Scarecrow and Tin Woodman)

== Bibliography ==
- Holsinger, M. Paul, ed. (1999). War and American Popular Culture: A Historical Encyclopedia. Westport: Greenwood Press.
- Ravitch, Diane, ed. (2000). The American Reader. New York: HarperCollins.
