= Bert Peters (composer) =

American composer

Bert E. Peters was a composer in the United States. His work was published as sheet music.

The song "Tattle Tales" he composed with words by Harold Atteridge reportedly had good sales for music publisher Victor Kremer.

In 1919 he gave a favorable opinion of the song "Who Said So" performed by Clarence Williams.

== Music ==
- Give the boy a chance, Sam!"
- "Morning Cy!: Barn Dance"
- "While the band is playing Dixie", lyrics by Howard McCarver
- "When I dream of old Erin"
- "Hollywood" (1929), arranger
- "Mrs. O'Harahan", words by Harold Atteridge
- "Tattle Tales" with words by Harold Atteridge
- "Can't You Hear the Cuckoo Calling" (1938)
