= Anna Laughlin =

American actress

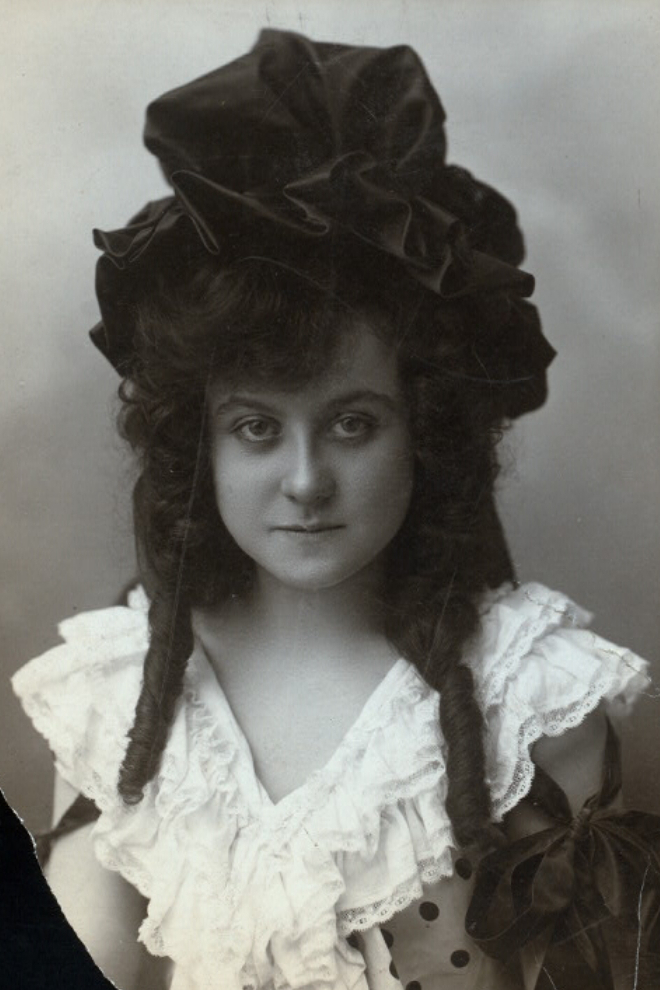
- Born: October 11, 1883; Sacramento, California, U.S.
- Died: April 5, 1937 (aged 53); New York City, U.S.
- Resting place: Woodlawn Cemetery (Bronx, NY)
- Occupation: Actress
- Spouse: Dwight V. Monroe (m. 1904; died 1921)
- Children: Lucy Monroe

Anna Laughlin (October 11, 1883 – April 5, 1937) was an American actress on stage and in silent films. In 1902, she became the first actress to play Dorothy Gale.

== Early life ==
Anna Laughlin was born in Sacramento, California. She began appearing on stage as a "child elocutionist", and then in vaudeville and touring companies.

== Career ==
Laughlin went to New York as a young teenager, and was in Broadway shows by 1900's The Belle of Bohemia. In 1902, at age 19, she played Dorothy Gale in a musical production of The Wizard of Oz that started in Chicago and ran on Broadway through 1904. Other shows featuring Laughlin included His Majesty (1906), The Top o' th' World (1907), Mama's Boy (1912), When Claudia Smiles (1914). She also had a solo variety show in 1909. "Miss Laughlin is such a demure, pretty, and winsome little body that her appearance alone is sufficient to please the most hardened playgoer or vaudeville attendant," commented a New York reviewer, "but when combined with her truly artistic singing, it is a treat that none can fail to enjoy. In widowhood she had a brief comeback on Broadway in 1925, in The Fall Guy.

Laughlin appeared in more than a dozen silent films, all made between 1913 and 1915, including The Rebellious Pupil (1913, a short), Northern Lights (1914), The Greyhound (1914), The Amazing Mr. Fellman (1915), and What Happened to Father (1915), Crooky Scruggs (1915) and The Crown Prince's Double (1916).

== Personal life ==
Laughlin married Dwight "Van" Monroe (1874-1921), a jeweler, in 1904. They had a daughter, Lucy Monroe, who became a noted singer. Laughlin was widowed by 1925 and died by suicide from gas poisoning in 1937, in New York. She was 53 years old.

In 2011, Anna Laughlin's personal copy of The Wizard of Oz was auctioned on eBay.
