= Arthur Hill (English actor) =

Arthur Albert Hill
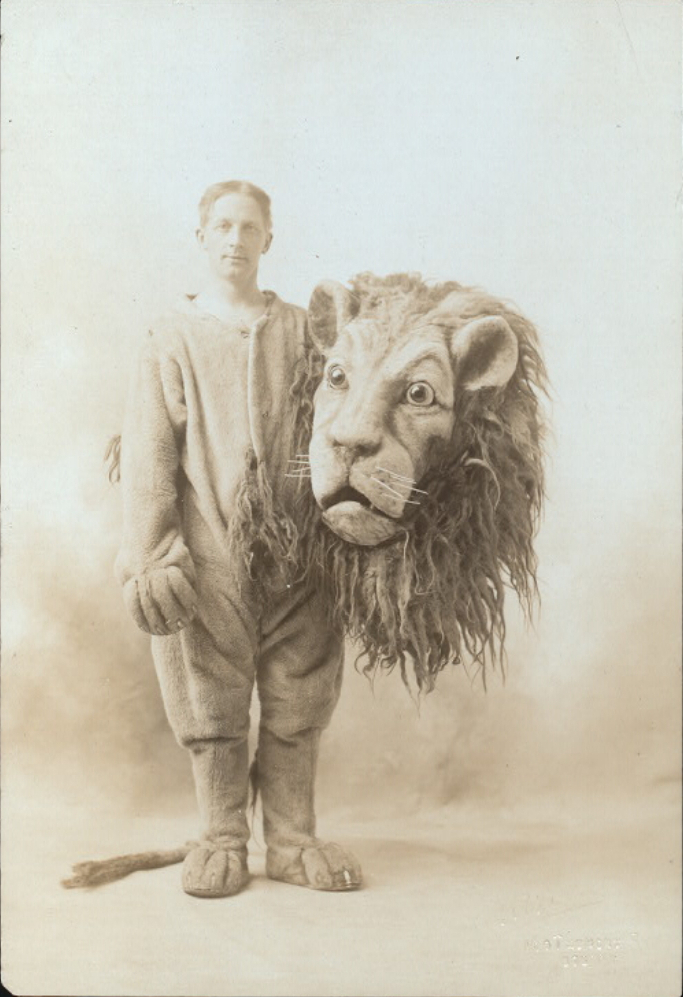
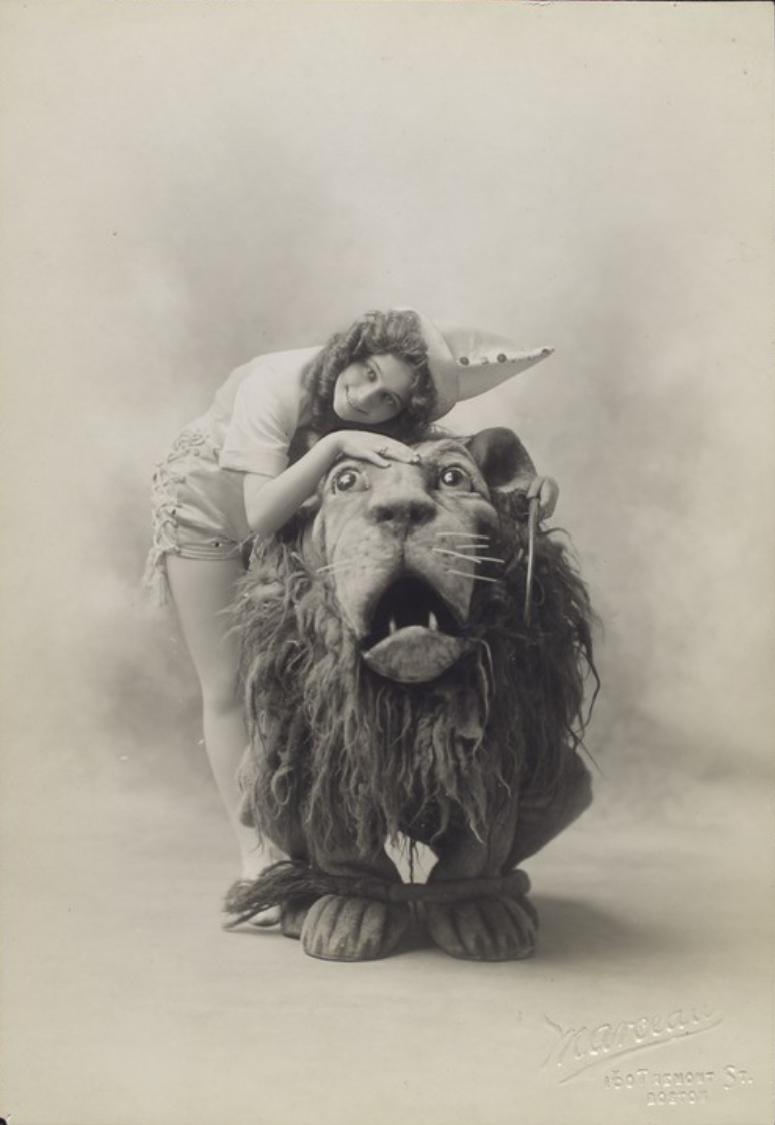
- Arthur Hill as the Cowardly Lion
- Born: Arthur Hill; 19 October 1874
- Died: 9 April 1932
- Occupation: Animal impersonator
- Years active: 1900s-1930s
- Known for: Playing the Cowardly Lion in The Wizard of Oz

Arthur Albert Hill (1874–1932) was an English animal impersonator for theatre. Hill’s most famous role was as the Cowardly Lion in The Wizard of Oz.

== Biography ==
Arthur Hill began his career performing animals in pantomimes. Among his roles were the wolf in Little Red Riding Hood, the bear in Valentine and Orson and the cat in Dick Wittington. Hill’s animal impersonations became very popular and in 1902 he was offered the role of the Cowardly Lion in the original production of The Wizard of Oz, written by L. Frank Baum, who also wrote the book of the same name.

However, unlike the original book, the Lion was not a central character and was reduced to a bit part. He was also much more animalistic, as he did not speak. His quest for courage was also deleted. Despite this, Hill still earned critical acclaim and his performance was highly popular.

Hill said that the lion was the most strenuous role he ever had to play, as the costume was so heavy and elaborate. The costume weighed eighty pounds and was said to be modelled on a study of a lion’s head by Rosa Bonheur. The costume consisted of two pieces: a head & mane section, and a body section that was made from a real lion skin. Hill was given limited visibility by peering through the lion’s mouth which was opened by pulling a string. Strings also operated the eyes, ears and tongue. The sound of roaring was created by an offstage stagehand that rubbed a piece of resin up and down a stout cord fastened at one end to the centre of a drumhead stretched over a barrel.

The role earned Hill fame, and after appearing in the original production and reprising it for the production’s revival, he became a regular on Broadway as animals. He appeared in many shows throughout the rest of his life. One of them, A Good Little Devil, also featured another animal actor, Pat Walshe, who, coincidentally. later appeared in the 1939 version of The Wizard of Oz. In addition to appearing in the stage production of A Good Little Devil, he was also brought, along with much of the show's cast, to appear in the 1914 silent film. In the same year he made another film appearance in The Yellow Traffic.

After a long and successful career in Broadway and Pantomime, Hill died at the age of 57 on 9 April 1932.

== Broadway appearances ==
- Happy Days
- Everything
- The Cohan Revue
- Cheer Up
- The Passing Show
- A Good Little Devil
- The Echo
- Ziegfeld Follies
- The Top o' th' World
- The Wizard of Oz

== Filmography ==
- A Good Little Devil
- The Yellow Traffic Light
