= Paul Tietjens =

American classical composer (1877–1943)

Paul Tietjens (/ˈtɪtʃənz/; May 22, 1877 – November 25, 1943) was an American composer of the early twentieth century. He is best known for composing music for The Wizard of Oz, the 1902 stage adaptation of L. Frank Baum's The Wonderful Wizard of Oz, one of the great popular hits of its era.

Tietjens was born and raised in St. Louis, Missouri. At age 15 he appeared as a piano soloist with the St. Louis Symphony. He later studied in Europe with Hugo Kaun, Harold Bauer, and Theodor Leschetizky.

Early in his career, Tietjens's ambition was to establish himself as a successful composer of comic operas and operettas. He approached L. Frank Baum in March 1901, not long after the publication and success of The Wonderful Wizard of Oz. According to Baum's later recollection,

"The thought of making my fairy tale into a play had never even occurred to me when, one evening, my doorbell rang and I found a spectacled young man standing on the mat."

By another report, though, they met through Ike Morgan, a Chicago artist who worked on Baum's American Fairy Tales (1901). Baum and Tietjens agreed to develop stage projects together. Their first attempts had nothing to do with Oz. They wrote a show titled The Octopus, or The Title Trust, which was rejected by producers in Chicago and New York. Their next venture was a musical called King Midas, which was never completed.

It was illustrator W. W. Denslow who suggested a Wizard of Oz stage adaptation. Though Baum was at first cool to the idea, Tietjens was enthusiastic. Baum prepared a libretto, and the project went forward. Tietjens included two songs from The Octopus ("Love Is Love" and "The Traveler and the Pie"). The show went through many script revisions and changes; Tietjens's score was supplemented with music composed by A. Baldwin Sloane and others. Quarrels over the partitioning of the royalties (Denslow was co-copyright holder of the book, and designed the sets and costumes for the musical) led to a permanent rupture between Baum and Denslow. Yet the show premiered in Chicago on 16 June 1902, and moved to Broadway in January 1903. It was an enormous hit. It ran through 1907 and then toured widely. The income from the show made Tietjens financially independent at a relatively early age.

Tietjens, however, never equaled that early popular success in subsequent shows. He wrote The Sacred Serpent (1904), a three-act musical comedy. He composed incidental music for J. M. Barrie's play A Kiss for Cinderella. He worked with Baum on another project, called The Pipes o' Pan (which might have been a revised version of King Midas); it was never produced, and survives only in a fragment.

In 1904 he married the poet Eunice Strong Hammond, who became known under her married name, Eunice Tietjens. They had two daughters, Idea and Janet. The death of their elder daughter Idea at the age of four may have contributed to the break-up of the marriage; the couple separated in 1910 and divorced in 1914.

In addition to his works for popular theater, Tietjens composed symphonies, a concerto, sonatas, and chamber works. His most significant serious work is arguably his opera The Tents of the Arabs. In 1916, he was about to produce an opera in Berlin, but World War I shut it down just before opening night. Tietjens' compositions were confiscated, and he was accused of being a spy. He was arrested in London and only released when Frederick W. Well, former Berlin correspondent for the New York Times and the Daily Mail, intervened. Although Tietjens returned to America, his musical scores and compositions were apparently never recovered.

Tietjens spent much of his life in Europe. He married the artist Marjorie Richardson December 25, 1927 He and his wife Marjorie Tietjens lived in New York City through 1942. When his health failed in 1942, he and his wife returned to St. Louis to live with his sister, Olga Dammert, and he died there in 1943. His manuscripts are in the Gaylord Music Library at Washington University in St. Louis; the University's Tietjens Hall is named in his honor. His diaries are part of the collection of the Newberry Library in Chicago.
