= Grace Kimball =

American stage actress

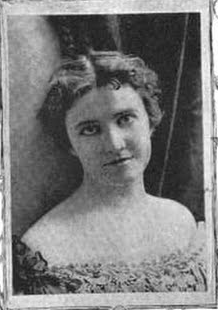
Grace Kimball, from an 1895 publication.

Grace Kimball (February 18, 1868) was an American stage actress, known for playing leading roles opposite to E. H. Sothern, including in the first play adaptation of The Prisoner of Zenda.

Kimball was born in Grand Rapids, Michigan, in 1868. She moved to New York City to pursue acting and studied under David Belasco. She first appeared on stage playing a maid in A Possible Case around 1888.

She first acted in Sothern's company in 1893, appearing in the role of Fanny Hedden in a revival of Letterblair.

In 1897 she married Laurence McGuire, and left the stage for a few years before returning. She continued to appear on stage through at least 1913, when she was in the cast of The Passing Show of 1913.

In her later years she resided with her husband in Greenwich, Connecticut.
