= David C. Montgomery =

American actor (1870–1917)

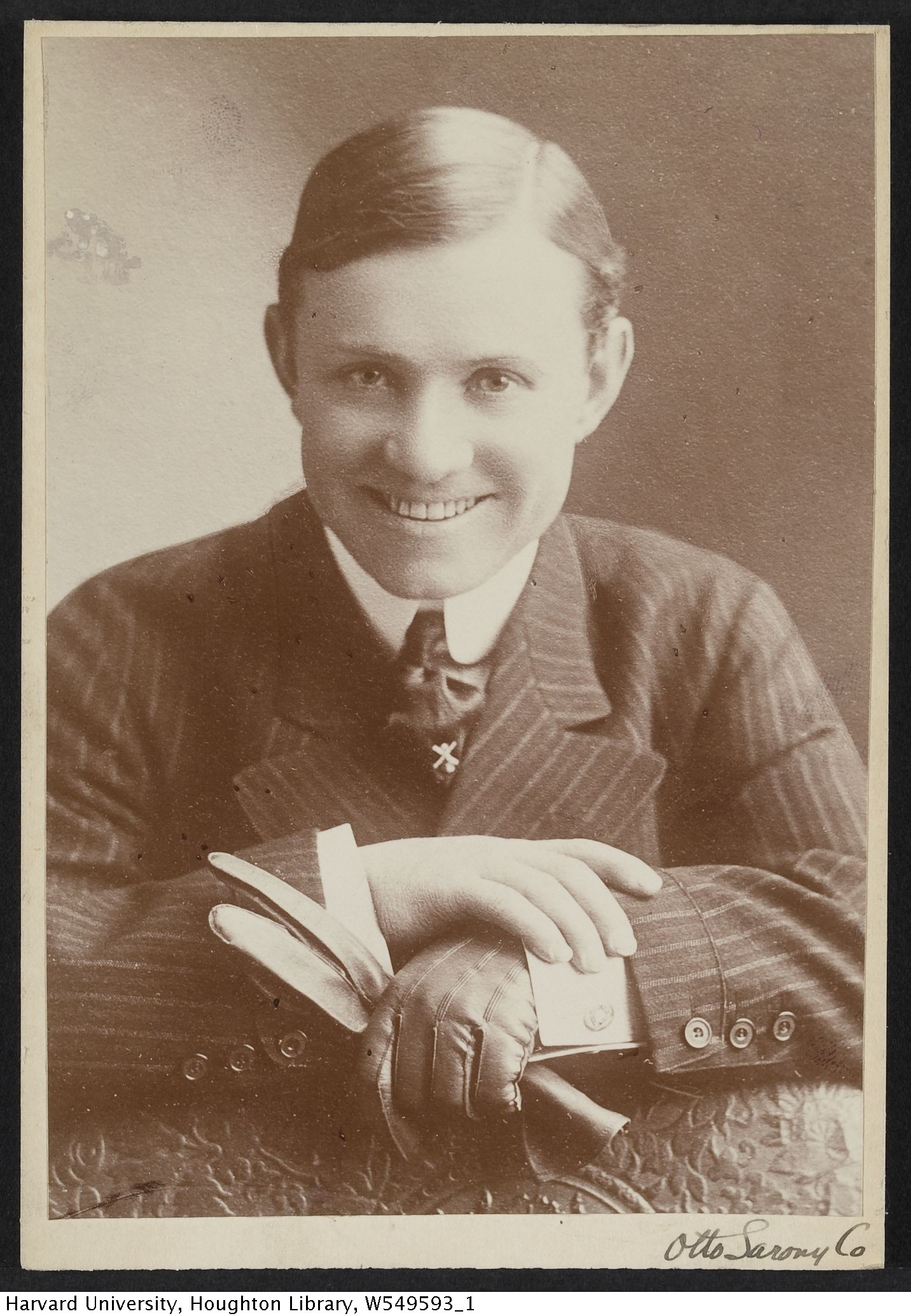
- Montgomery in a photograph taken by Otto Sarony
- Born: March 21, 1870; St. Joseph, Missouri, U.S.
- Died: April 20, 1917 (aged 47); Chicago, Illinois, U.S.
- Occupation: Vaudeville performer
- Known for: Montgomery and Stone

David Craig Montgomery (March 21, 1870 – April 20, 1917) was an American actor and dancer, the partner of Fred Stone. Montgomery and Stone became famous for their performance in the 1903 Broadway musical The Wizard of Oz, and had many other successes in musical comedy and vaudeville.

== Early years ==
David Craig Montgomery was born in St. Joseph, Missouri, on March 21, 1870. In March 1887 he was given a juvenile role in Smokey Moke at a local variety beer hall called Streakbiner's Garden. He had been thinking of getting work with a railway, but now decided to go on the stage, and practiced a routine in his back yard. He learned to become a dancer and contortionist. He put on his song and dance routine at various minor local venues, getting a good reception. He played for some years in St. Joseph and Kansas City, then found work in Denver and the surrounding mining towns, where he first met Fred Stone. Stone (1873–1959) from Valmont, Colorado, was an acrobat and tightrope walker.

While in Denver Montgomery was offered a job with the J. H. Haverly’s minstrel company, which was planning to first tour the southern USA and then move to New York. The minstrels played in Denver and then traveled to Texas where they played in Fort Worth and Dallas. They reached Galveston in January 1896 en route to New Orleans. Montgomery met Fred Stone again in Galveston, and invited him to become his partner. Billy Rice, manager of the minstrels. offered Stone a job, and he accepted. This was the start of a 22-year partnership.

== Travelling act ==
In New Orleans, Montgomery and Stone played a song and dance routine, and Stone did an acrobatic act of his own. Attendance was poor, and after three days the Minstrels folded, unable to pay the cast. Montgomery was able to find a two-week engagement at a local variety theatre for himself and Stone, then got an offer from Billy Rice for them to appear in a minstrel show in Chicago at Hall's Casino. Montgomery had a good singing voice. In Chicago, Stone taught him new dance steps to use in their acrobatic tap dance routine. Montgomery and Stone were hired to perform in the Casino, Lyceum and Hopkins theaters in Chicago from March to June, and became well known for their original dance routine.

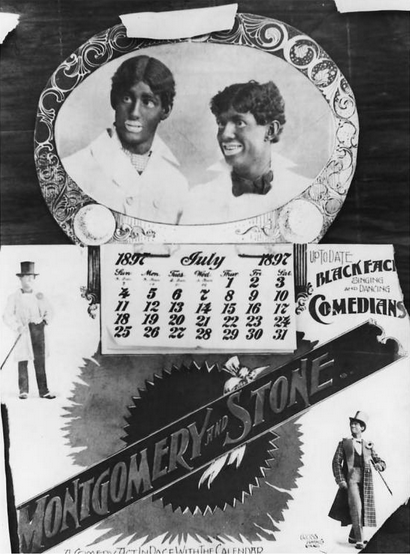
1897 poster for the Montgomery and Stone minstrel act

Montgomery and Stone signed up for the next season with Gus Hill's touring vaudeville company in May 1896. After spending the summer in Chicago the two took the train to Boston, where they opened in Gus Hill's Novelties on September 19, 1896, at Keith's Theater. The tour with Gus Fields took them to Newark, Washington, Baltimore, Pittsburgh, Indianapolis, Cincinnati, St. Louis, Kansas City and to Chicago's Haymarket Theatre for Christmas. In Chicago they accepted an offer from Joe Weber to perform in the Russell Brothers show during the 1897–98 season. They continued with Hill's company, via Cleveland, Buffalo, Rochester and Syracuse to reach New York City at the beginning of February 1897. By this time their names were second on the posters after Gus Hill himself.

Hill's tour continued, finally closing on May 22, 1897, in Cleveland. Montgomery spent the summer in New York and Stone with his family in Chicago, a pattern they would repeat for the length of their partnership. The Russell Brothers show opened on October 2, 1897, at the Olympic Theatre in Chicago. While still in blackface, Montgomery and Stone had a new comic song and dance act that had shed its minstrel origins. A review of the show said "Montgomery and Stone, in blackface, gave excellent imitations of real politicians, the hobby of the day, and by their singing and quaint expressions, as well as their startling moves, kept the audience laughing and applauding."

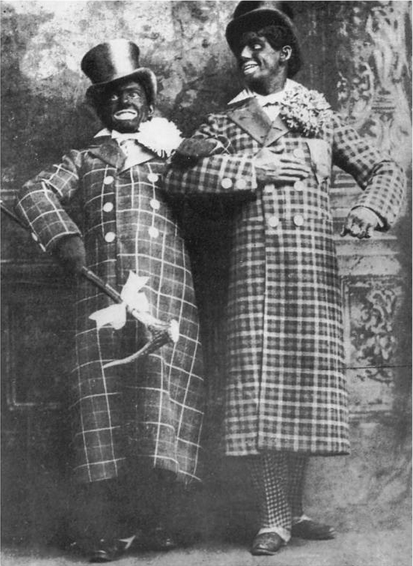
Montgomery and Stone at the Palace Theatre, London, in 1899

The show was unexpectedly forced to close in Cleveland in early February 1898. Montgomery and Stone were hired by Gustav Walter to play in his Orpheum Circuit theaters on west coast, starting in San Francisco on March 5. This engagement ended when Walter died on May 9, 1898. The two were engaged in St. Louis, where they played at various venues for the summer. For the 1898–99 season they were engaged to tour with Hyde's Comedians. They left this company after a disagreement with another, similar act. They played in New York over Christmas 1898, and were offered a job for the fall of 1899 in the Palace Theatre, London, England.

Montgomery and Stone returned to the West coast in January 1899, playing in California until April 1899, and had a series of theatre engagements in St. Louis, Chicago, New York and Buffalo before leaving for England. They opened in the 16th position on a vaudeville bill at the Palace Theatre on October 21, 1899. Their act was a great success. The engagement ended at the end of December, and they returned to New York in January 1900. For the rest of Spring 1900 the pair were much in demand, and played to theaters in New York, Philadelphia, Boston and Albany. They were booked for the summer in Coney Island, and signed with the Johnstone Bennett vaudeville company for the 1900–01 season.

== Fame ==
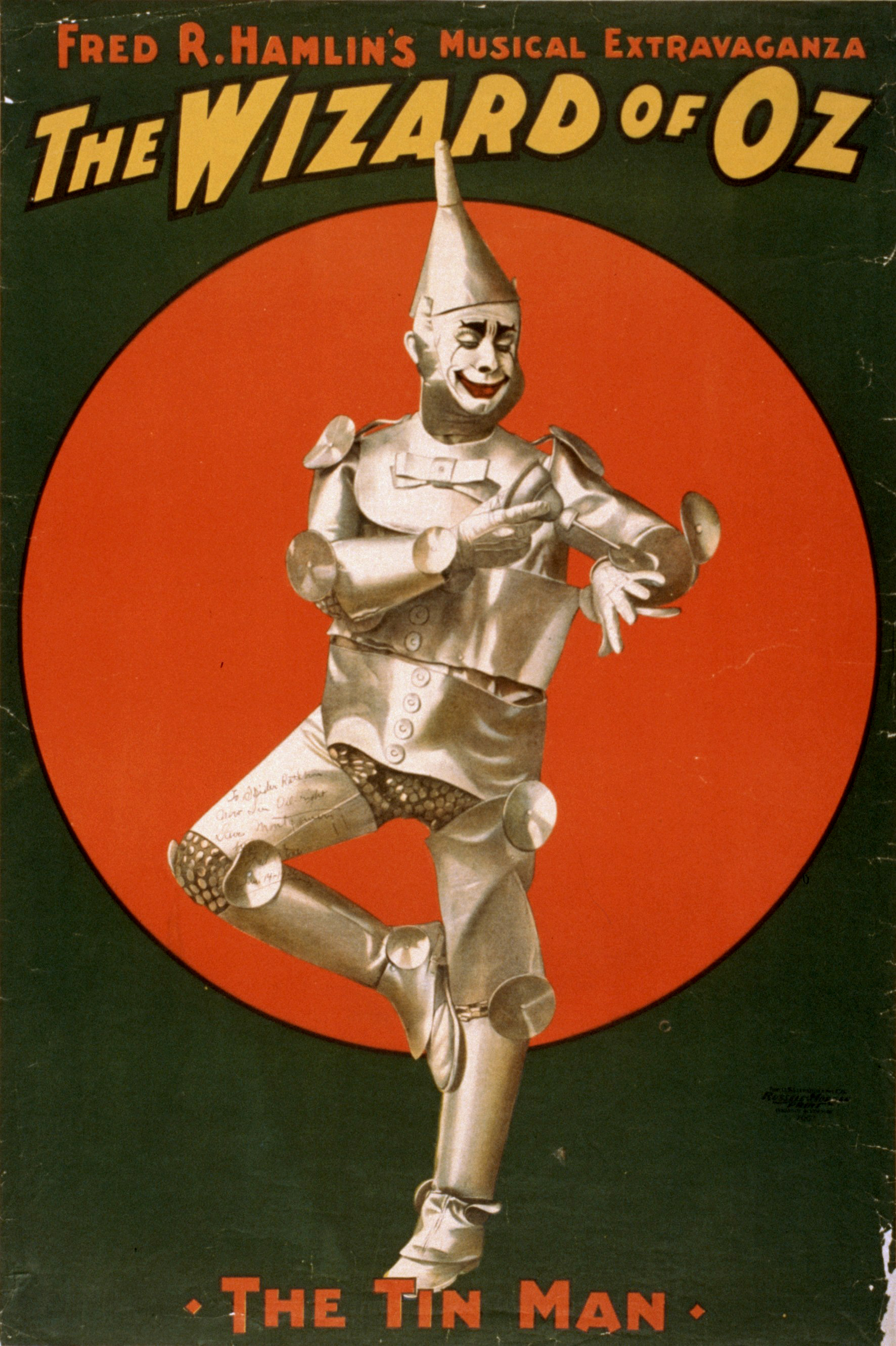
Montgomery as the Tin Woodman in 1903

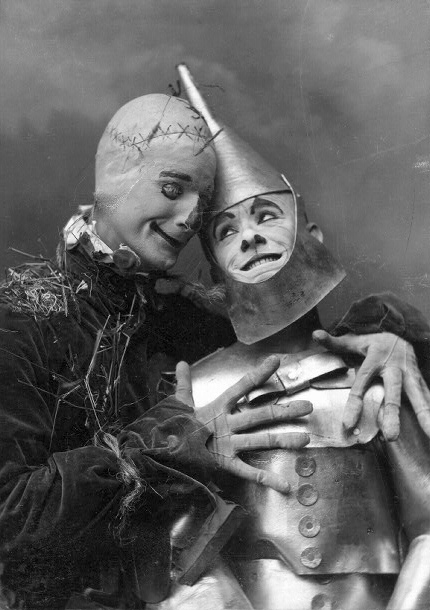
Fred Stone as the Scarecrow and David C. Montgomery as the Tin Woodman in the 1902 stage extravanganza The Wizard of Oz

Montgomery and Stone received an offer to appear in A World of Novelties at Miner's Bowery Theatre. They first appeared on Broadway in 1901 in The Girl From Up There, at the old Herald Square Theatre. The critics identified them as the most significant players in this show. They went with the show to London in 1902. Vincent P. Bryan wrote most of Montgomery and Stone's comic songs. They performed the song Nautical Nonsense in The Girl From Up There.in 1901. This may be the same song as Hurrah for Baffin's Bay, one of the hits from The Wizard of Oz, with music by Theodore F. Morse and words by Vincent Bryan.

Montgomery and Stone were hired to appear in The Wizard of Oz. They persuaded director Julian Mitchell to let them introduce their trademark physical humor. Montgomery played the Tin Man with creaky movements and a broad grin, while Stone played the loose-limbed Scarecrow. Their physical antics and comic duets made them both stars. The show ran in New York for nearly a year, then toured the US with great success. They continued to play in The Wizard of Oz on tour and in return engagements through to 1905.

Montgomery and Stone were co-stars of The Red Mill in 1906, an operetta written by Victor Herbert. They played the roles of Con Kidder and Kid Conner, two penniless American vaudevillians stranded at a small inn in Holland. The Red Mill opened in New York at the Knickerbocker Theatre on September 24, 1906. The Winthrop Moving Picture Company made very short films of two of Montgomery and Stone's routines from this show in May 1907. Montgomery and Stone often performed in vaudeville tours between Broadway engagements where they appeared in The Old Town (1909), The Lady of the Slipper (1912) and Chin-Chin (1914).

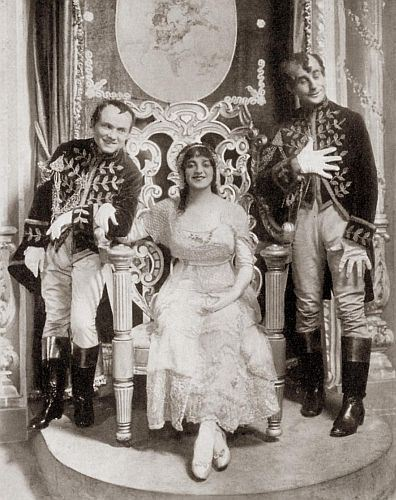
Montgomery as Punks, Janis as Cinderella and Stone as Spooks in The Lady of the Slipper 1912

Victor Herbert’s musical play The Lady of the Slipper opened at the Globe Theatre, New York, on October 28, 1912. Elsie Janis played Cinderella, with Montgomery and Stone as Punks and Spooks. A reviewer said, "‘The names of David C. Montgomery and Fred A. Stone have been inseparably linked with fun and frolic ever since years ago they forsook vaudeville to enter the musical comedy field, and the same applies to Miss Janis, and in their present vehicle they live up to their reputations to the utmost degree." Chin-Chin was the greatest hit of the 1914–15 Broadway season. It ran at the Globe Theatre from October 20, 1914, to July 3, 1915. The show is about painted dolls and tin soldiers in a Peking toy shop that come to life and meet Aladdin and his lamp. Both children and adults loved the show, which ran to packed audiences.

=== Death ===
David C. Montgomery died unexpectedly after a short illness in Chicago, Illinois, on April 20, 1917. He was aged 47. He is interred at Woodlawn Cemetery in the Bronx, New York City.

== Broadway shows ==
Montgomery's Broadway shows (all musicals) were:

- The Girl from Up There, as Solomon Scarlet, January 7 – March 30, 1901
- The Wizard of Oz, as Niccolo Chopper January 20 – October 3, 1903, and March 21, 1904 – November 25, 1905
- The Red Mill, September 24, 1906 – June 29, 1907
- The Old Town, as Archibald Hawkins, January 10 – June 4, 1910
- The Lady of the Slipper, as Punks, October 28, 1912 – May 17, 1913
- Chin Chin, as Chin Hop Lo, The Widow, Coolie, Clown and Gendarme, October 20, 1914 – July 3, 1915

== Films ==
Montgomery appeared with Stone in three short films in 1907:

- Dancing Boxing Match (Winthrop Moving Picture Company) 1 minute, silent
- Goodbye John (Winthrop Moving Picture Company) silent
- The Dutch Kiddies (Winthrop Moving Picture Company) silent

== Sources ==
- Bayles-Yeager, Danni (2014). "Montgomery & Stone". Bayles-Yeager Online Archives of the Performing Arts.
- "David C. Montgomery". IBDB.
- "David Craig Montgomery". IMDb.
- Fields, Armond (January 22, 2002). Fred Stone: Circus Performer and Musical Comedy Star. McFarland. ISBN 978-0-7864-1161-0.
- Kenrick, John (1997). "Montgomery, David C.". Who's Who in Musicals.
- Maxine, David (2014). "Montgomery & Stone in THE RED MILL". Tiger Treats.
- Maxine, David (2014b). "Hurrah for Baffin's Bay". Tiger Tunes.
- Whit. (November 2, 1912). "The Lady of the Slipper". The New York Clipper. New York.
