= Victor Kremer (producer) =

American film producer

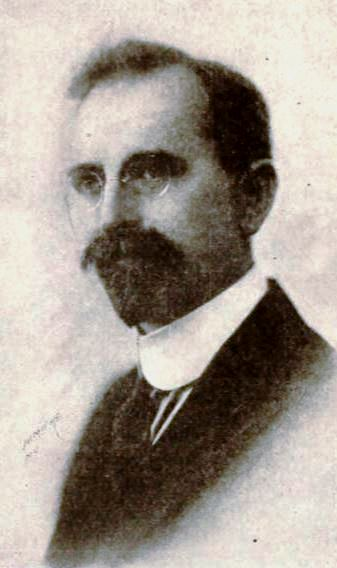

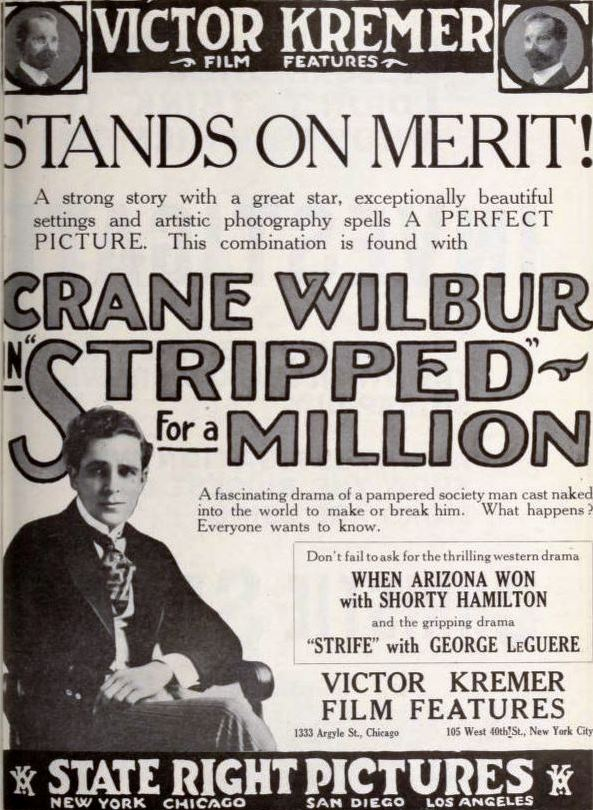

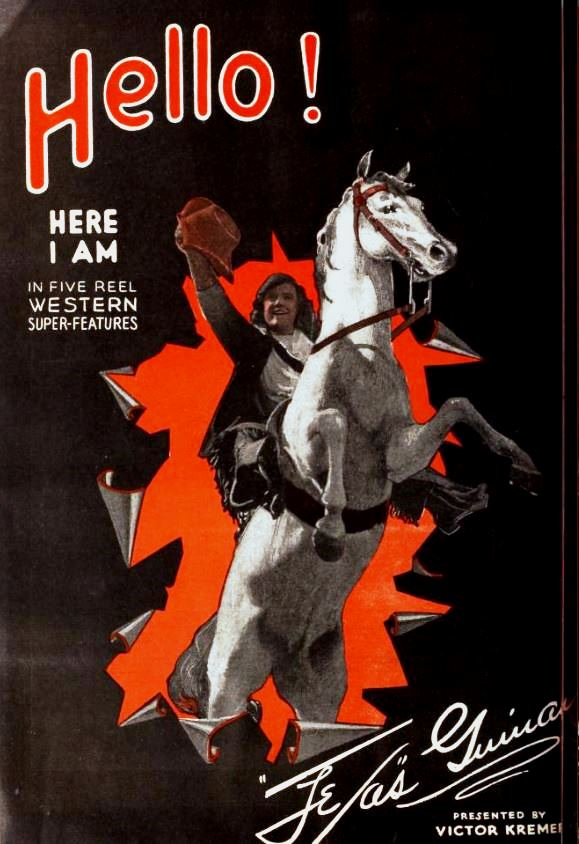
Advertisement for Kremer's films starring Texas Guinan

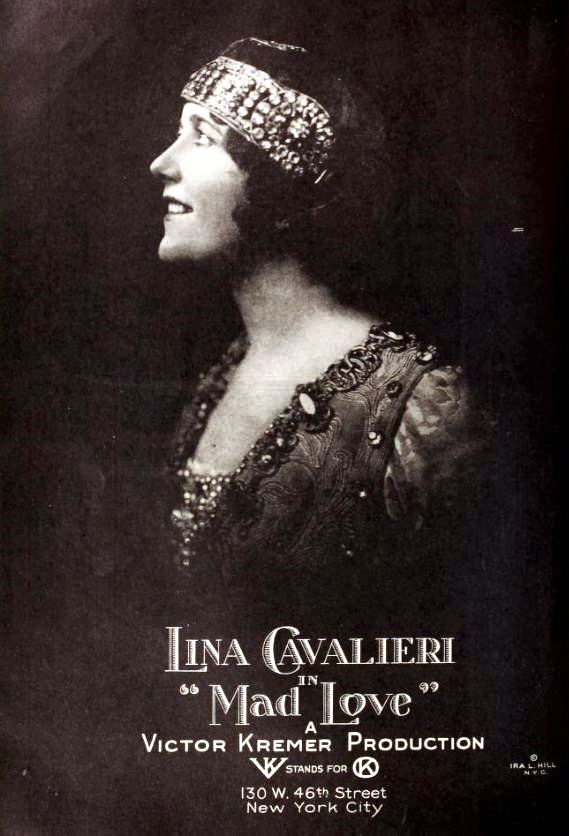
Advertisement for Mad Love

Victor Albert Kremer (born June 17, 1870, in Germany) was a music publisher, film producer and distributor, as well as a real estate developer in the U.S. An immigrant from Germany, Kremer established a music publishing company. He later acquired studio space to produce his own films and acquired film rights from Essanay as it shut operations. His company reissued several Charlie Chaplin films.

Kremer was born on June 17, 1870, in Alsheim, Alzey-Worms, Rhineland-Palatinate, Germany. He immigrated to the U.S. on November 29, 1892, and by 1898 Kremer had formed a music publishing firm. He was Alfred Solman’s cousin and issued Solman’s first song, “Miss Phoebe Johnsing”. Kremer and the Solman family shared a residence from 1898 to 1900, and during or shortly after that time, Solman and his wife became estranged and then divorced. On July 6, 1903, Eugenia Solman married Victor Kremer.

Kremer was production manager for W. H. Clifford's short-lived film company. After it failed, he distributed the company's Shorty Hamilton western films from his namesake film company.

Texas Guinan made two films with his production company. He also made a film with opera sensation Lina Cavalieri.

He had an office in New York City. He acquired control of four Charlie Chaplin films.

Two directors attempted to bring suit for improper allocations of money after being removed from the company.

His music publishing company produced several songs by Theron Catlen Bennett. He reported success selling the song "Tattle Tales" composed by Bert Peters with words by Harold Atteridge.

== Gallery ==
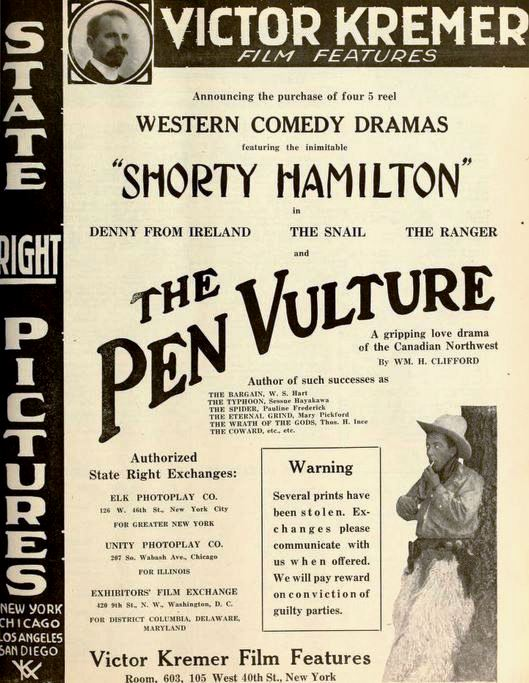
The Oen Vulture (1918)

== Filmography ==
- The Pen Vulture (1918)
- When Arizona Won (1919) starring ·Shorty Hamilton
- Stripped for a Million (1919)
- A Jitney Elopement, reissue of 1915 Charlie Chaplin movie
- A Burlesque on Carmen, reissue of 1915 Chaplin film
- By the Sea (1919), reissue of Chaplin's 1915 film
- The Champion, re-release of the 1915 film
- Work
- Dangerous Trails (1920)
- Mad Love (1920), starring Lina Cavalieri
- Voices (1920)
- The Winding Trail (1921)
- Screen Smiles
- Broncho Billy and the Rattler

== Discography ==
- "Palm Leaf Rag" (1903) by Scott Joplin
