= McCarver Brothers =

American minstrel and vaudeville duo

The McCarver Brothers, Howard McCarver and William McCarver, performed in minstrel and vaudeville shows from the late 19th century into the 20th. William McCarver (often known as "Billy" or "Billie") was lauded for his make-up, contortion, singing, and dancing in his comedy duo performances.

In 1894, William McCarver was part of Howard McCarver's Operatic Minstrels and in 1895 they were with Al G. Field. He also performed with Arthur Rockwell's Georgia Minstrels.

One of his reported performing partners was Theodore Pankey.

In one review, William was applauded for his contortions, pantomime, song, and dance as "fresh stuff" that are not regularly encountered.
