= The Winding Trail (1921 film) =

1921 film

- Directed by: George Martin
- Starring: Marjorie Clifford; Buck Manning; William V. Mong
- Edited by: J. N. Haron
- Production company: Victor Kremer Film Features
- Release date: February 1921 (US)
- Running time: 5 reels
- Country: United States
- Languages: Silent; English intertitles

The Winding Trail, is a 1921 American silent Western film directed by George Martin and starring Marjorie Clifford, Buck Manning, and William V. Mong. It was released on January 14, 1918.

== Cast list ==
- Marjorie Clifford as Alene Hamlin
- Buck Manning as "Laughing Larry"
- William V. Mong
