= Damon Knight bibliography =

List of books by Damon Knight

This is a bibliography of works by Damon Knight.

The bibliography is in chronological order of first publication of the books. In most cases only first editions are shown for each title. In some cases, multiple editions are shown if the title was changed; this happened for Hell's Pavement, for example. Some other variant titles are listed separately, with notes indicating what the original titles were.

The main bibliographic sources are footnoted from this paragraph and provided much of the information in the following sections. Some footnotes annotating specific points are provided at the appropriate places below.

== Novels and fixups ==
- Hell's Pavement. New York: Lion Books, 1955; paperback. Later retitled Analogue Men. A fixup of "The Analogues", which appeared in Astounding Science Fiction in January 1952, and "Turncoat", which appeared in Thrilling Wonder Stories in April 1953; more than half the book is new material.
- The People Maker. Rockville Center, NY: Zenith Books, 1959; paperback. This was expanded as A for Anything.
- Masters of Evolution. New York: Ace Books, 1959; paperback. Bound dos-a-dos with George O. Smith's Fire in the Heavens as Ace Double D-375. Original shorter version appeared in Galaxy in 1954 as "Natural State".
- The Sun Saboteurs. New York: Ace Books, 1961; paperback. Bound dos-a-dos with The Light of Lilith by G. McDonald Wallis as Ace Double F-108. Original shorter version appeared in If in 1955 as "The Earth Quarter". Reissued under the original title in the omnibus World Without Children and The Earth Quarter; also reissued in the UK under the original title in the omnibus Two Novels.
- A for Anything. London: New English Library, 1961; paperback. Previously published as The People Maker; this is the first printing of the complete text.
- Analogue Men. New York: Berkley Publishing Corporation, 1962; paperback. Retitling of Hell's Pavement.
- Beyond the Barrier. Garden City: Doubleday & Company, 1964; hardcover.
- The Rithian Terror. New York: Ace Books, 1965; paperback. Bound dos-a-dos with Knight's Off Center, as Ace Double M-113 see below. Original magazine appearance in Startling Stories in 1953 under the title "Double Meaning"; later included under the original title in Rule Golden/Double Meaning and Two Novels.
- Mind Switch. New York: Berkley Books, 1965; paperback.
- The Other Foot. London: Ronald Whiting & Wheaton, 1966; hardcover. This is a UK retitling of Mind Switch.
- The World and Thorinn. New York: Berkley Books, 1981; hardcover. A fixup, based on "The World and Thorinn", Galaxy, April 1968; "The Garden of Ease", Galaxy, June 1968; and "The Star Below", Galaxy, August 1968.
- The Man in the Tree. London: Victor Gollancz, 1984; hardcover.
- CV. New York: Tor Books, 1985; hardcover.
- The Observers. New York: Tor Books, 1988; hardcover.
- A Reasonable World. New York: Tor Books, 1991; hardcover.
- Why Do Birds. New York: Tor Books, 1992; hardcover.
- Humpty Dumpty: An Oval New York: Tor Books, 1996; hardcover.

== Short story collections and omnibus editions ==
- Far Out. New York: Simon & Schuster, 1961; hardcover.
- In Deep. New York: Berkley Publishing Corporation, 1963; paperback.
- Off Center. New York: Ace Books, 1965; paperback. Bound dos-a-dos with Knight's The Rithian Terror, as Ace Double M-113 see below.
- Turning On. Garden City: Doubleday & Company, 1966; hardback.
- Two Novels. London: Victor Gollancz, 1974; hardback. Included Double Meaning, which was also published separately as The Rithian Terror; see above.
- Three Novels. Garden City: Doubleday & Company, 1967; hardback. Later reissued in the UK as Natural State and Other Stories.
- Off Centre. London: Victor Gollancz, 1969; hardcover. Re-issue of Off Center in UK, with three additional stories.
- World Without Children and The Earth Quarter. New York: Lancer Books, 1970; paperback.
- Natural State and Other Stories. London and Sydney: Pan Books, 1975; paperback. This is a UK retitling of Three Novels.
- The Best of Damon Knight. Garden City: Nelson Doubleday, 1976; hardcover.
- Rule Golden. New York:Morrow/Avon, 1979; paperback.
- Late Knight Edition. Cambridge:NESFA Press, 1985; hardcover.
- One Side Laughing: Stories Unlike Other Stories. New York: St. Martin's Press, 1991; hardcover.
- God's Nose. Eugene, Oregon:Pulphouse Publishing, 1991; paperback. This was in the Pulphouse Author's Choice Monthly series.
- Rule Golden/Double Meaning. New York:Tor Books, 1991; paperback. This was number 34 in the Tor Double Novels series. Double Meaning was also published separately as The Rithian Terror; see above.

== Other ==
- VOR. New York: Avon Books, 1958; paperback. Knight collaborated with James Blish on a short story titled "The Weakness of RVOG", published in the February 1949 issue of Thrilling Wonder Stories. Blish later expanded this into VOR.
- Better Than One. Cambridge: NESFA Press, 1980; hardcover. A collection of stories by both Knight and Kate Wilhelm; four by Knight, five by Wilhelm, with some additional introductory material by each.
- "On Hood River, Oregon" in: Temper!, Vol. I, No. 1, May 1945. New York: Parallax. ed. Judy & Dan Zissman. Knight's contribution to this fanzine is talking trash about Hood River.

== Translated books ==
- Ashes, Ashes by René Barjavel. Garden City: Doubleday, 1967; hardcover.

Also see Thirteen French Science-Fiction Stories in the "Edited books" section, below.

== Edited books ==
- A Century of Science Fiction, New York: Simon & Schuster, 1962; hardcover.
- First Flight: Maiden Voyages in Space and Time. New York: Lancer Books, 1963; paperback.
- A Century of Great Short Science Fiction Novels. New York: Delacorte Press, 1964; hardcover.
- Tomorrow X 4. Greenwich, CN: Fawcett Publications, 1964; hardcover.
- Beyond Tomorrow. New York: Harper & Row, 1965; hardcover.
- The Dark Side. Garden City: Doubleday, 1965; hardcover.
- Thirteen French Science-Fiction Stories. Toronto: Bantam Books, 1965; paperback.
- Cities of Wonder. Garden City: Doubleday, 1966; hardcover.
- Nebula Award Stories 1965. Garden City: Doubleday, 1966; hardcover.
- Orbit 1. New York: Putnam, 1966; hardcover.
- Orbit 2. New York: Putnam, 1967; hardcover.
- Science Fiction Inventions. New York: Lancer Books, 1967; paperback.
- Worlds To Come. New York: Harper & Row, 1967; hardcover.
- The Metal Smile. New York: Belmont Books, 1968; paperback.
- One Hundred Years of Science Fiction. New York: Simon & Schuster, 1968; hardcover.
- Orbit 3. New York: Putnam, 1968; hardcover.
- Orbit 4. New York: Putnam, 1968; hardcover.
- Tomorrow and Tomorrow. New York: Simon & Schuster, 1968; hardcover.
- Toward Infinity. New York: Simon & Schuster, 1968; hardcover.
- Now Begins Tomorrow. New York: Lancer Books, 1969; paperback.
- Orbit 5. New York: Putnam, 1969; hardcover.
- Dimension X. New York: Simon & Schuster, 1970; hardcover.
- Orbit 6. New York: Putnam, 1970; hardcover.
- Orbit 7. New York: Putnam, 1970; hardcover.
- Orbit 8. New York: Putnam, 1970; hardcover.
- First Contact. New York: Pinnacle Books, 1971; hardcover.
- Orbit 9. New York: Putnam, 1971; hardcover.
- A Pocketful of Stars. Garden City: Doubleday, 1971; hardcover.
- The Shape of Things. New York: Popular Library, 1971; paperback.
- Orbit 10. New York: Putnam, 1972; hardcover.
- Orbit 11. New York: Putnam, 1972; hardcover.
- Perchance to Dream. Garden City: Doubleday, 1972; hardcover.
- A Science Fiction Argosy. New York: Simon & Schuster, 1972; hardcover.
- The Golden Road. New York: Simon & Schuster, 1973; hardcover.
- Orbit 12. New York: Putnam, 1973; hardcover.
- Happy Endings. Indianapolis; New York: Bobbs-Merrill, 1974; hardcover.
- Orbit 13. New York: Berkley, 1974; hardcover.
- Orbit 14. New York: Harper & Row, 1974; hardcover.
- Orbit 15. New York: Harper & Row, 1974; hardcover.
- A Shocking Thing. New York: Pocket Books, 1974; paperback.
- Best Stories from Orbit: Volumes 1-10. New York: Berkley, 1975; hardcover.
- Orbit 16. New York: Harper & Row, 1975; hardcover.
- Orbit 17. New York: Harper & Row, 1975; hardcover.
- Science Fiction of the Thirties. Indianapolis: Bobbs-Merrill, 1975; hardcover.
- Orbit 18. New York: Harper & Row, 1976; hardcover.
- Orbit 19. New York: Harper & Row, 1977; hardcover.
- Turning Points: Essays on the Art of Science Fiction. New York: Harper & Row, 1977; hardcover.
- Westerns of the 40's: Classics from the Great Pulps. Indianapolis/New York: Bobbs-Merrill, 1977; hardcover.

== Nonfiction ==
- The Stencil Duplicated Newspaper, Hood River, Oregon: F. S. Knight and D. Knight, 1941
- In Search of Wonder, Chicago: Advent Publishers, 1956
- Charles Fort: Prophet of the Unexplained, New York: Doubleday & Company, 1970
- The Futurians: The Story of the Science Fiction "Family" of the 30's that Produced Today's Top SF Writers and Editors. New York: John Day, 1977; hardcover.
- Creating Short Fiction. Cincinnati: Writer's Digest, 1981. Revised edition released in 1985.
