= The Golden Age of Science Fiction (anthology) =

Collection of science fiction short stories (1949–1962)

- First edition
- Author: Kingsley Amis
- Language: English
- Genre: Science fiction
- Publisher: Hutchinson
- Publication date: 1981
- Publication place: United Kingdom
- Pages: 370
- ISBN: 009145770X

The Golden Age of Science Fiction is an anthology of science fiction short stories all originally published between 1949 and 1962. The stories were selected and introduced by Kingsley Amis (1922-1995), who also wrote an Editor's Note and a 21-page Introduction. The collection was first published by Hutchinson in 1981 and was released in paperback by Penguin in 1983.

== Contents ==
- "The Quest for Saint Aquin", by Anthony Boucher
- "The Xi Effect", by Philip Latham
- "The Tunnel under the World", by Frederik Pohl
- "Old Hundredth", by Brian Aldiss
- "A Work of Art", by James Blish
- "Harrison Bergeron", by Kurt Vonnegut
- "The Voices of Time", by J. G. Ballard
- "Specialist", by Robert Sheckley
- "He Walked Around the Horses", by H. Beam Piper
- "The Game of Rat and Dragon", by Cordwainer Smith
- "The Nine Billion Names of God", by Arthur C. Clarke
- "The Streets of Ashkelon", by Harry Harrison
- "The Country of the Kind", by Damon Knight
- "The Machine that Won the War", by Isaac Asimov
- "Student Body", by F. L. Wallace
- "It's a Good Life", by Jerome Bixby
- "Sister Planet", by Poul Anderson

== Reception ==
Dave Pringle reviewed The Golden Age of Science Fiction for Imagine magazine, describing it as "a fat collection of 1950s SF, aimed at the 'general reader' and including stories by Pohl, Blish, Sheckley, Clarke, Asimov, etc. A good anthology, but many of us will have read it all before."

== Reviews ==
- Review by Ken Methold (1982) in Omega Science Digest, May-June 1982
- Review by Colin Greenland (1983) in Interzone, #5 Autumn 1983

== See also ==
- Golden Age of Science Fiction
