= Student Body =

Student Body may refer to:

- Students' union, a student organization in many colleges, universities, and high schools
- "Student Body" (short story), by F. L. Wallace, 1953
- Getting In, or Student Body, a 1994 film
