= Turned on =

Turned on is a phrase that describes a person who is sexually aroused.

It may also refer to the following:

- Turned On, a music album by Rollins Band
- Hot Girls Wanted: Turned On, a 2017 documentary series

== See also ==
- Turn on
- Turning On, science fiction short story collection by Damon Knight.
