= Natural State =

A natural state refers to

- the (speculative) pristine state of earth and its ecosystems in prehistory
- the economical, social, and ecological state of things in previously so-called "primitives" or indigenous cultures

Natural State could refer to the following:

- The original name for the novel Masters of Evolution
- The state nickname for the U.S. state of Arkansas
- A state characterized by its existence as a limited access order
- State of nature
