= Turn On =

Turn On may refer to:

- Turn-on, another word for sexual arousal
- Turn-On, a 1969 American sketch comedy TV series that was cancelled during its first episode
- The Turn-Ons, an American rock band
- Turn On, an English rock band formed by Tim Gane of Stereolab
- Turn on (The Beat Box), a single by American band Earth, Wind & Fire
- TurnOn, a 2015 video game developed Brainy Studio LLC

== See also ==
- "Turn on, tune in, drop out", a 1966 counterculture phrase coined by Timothy Leary in the 1960s
- Switch, an electrical component that allows a circuit to be turned on or off
- Turned on
- Turning On, science fiction short story collection by Damon Knight.
