= Be My Guest =

Be My Guest may refer to:

- Be My Guest (film), a 1965 British musical directed by Lance Comfort
- Be My Guest (horse) (1974–2004), a British Thoroughbred racehorse
- "Be My Guest" (short story), a 1958 story by Damon Knight
- "Be My Guest" (Fats Domino song), 1959
- "Be My Guest" (Gaitana song), 2012
- Be My Guest (talk show), a Hong Kong programme on TVB
- Be My Guest (Australian TV series), a 1957 Australian television series
- Be My Guest, a 1957 autobiography by Conrad Hilton
- "Be My Guest", a song by Trey Songz from the album Back Home

== See also ==
- "Be Our Guest", a song written by Howard Ashman and Alan Menken, from the 1991 animated film Beauty and the Beast
- Guest (disambiguation)
