= Ex tempore (disambiguation) =

Ex tempore or extempore is a Latin phrase.

- Extemporaneous speaking
- Ex Tempore (magazine) literary magazine published annually by the United Nations Society of Writers
- Extempore (short story)
- Extempore (software)
- Improvisational theater
