= To Serve Man (The Twilight Zone) =

- The Twilight Zone episode
- Susan Cummings and Richard Kiel
- Episode no.: Season 3 Episode 24
- Directed by: Richard L. Bare
- Teleplay by: Rod Serling
- Based on: "To Serve Man" by Damon Knight
- Production code: 4807
- Original air date: March 2, 1962

Guest appearances
- Lloyd Bochner; Richard Kiel; Susan Cummings; Joseph Ruskin; Hardie Albright; Theodore Marcuse; Bartlett Robinson; Carleton Young; Nelson Olmsted; Robert Tafur; Lomax Study; Jerry Fujikawa

Episode chronology
← Previous "The Last Rites of Jeff Myrtlebank"	Next → "The Fugitive"
- The Twilight Zone (1959 TV series) (season 3)

"To Serve Man" is the 24th episode of the third season of the anthology series The Twilight Zone, and the 89th overall. It originally aired on March 2, 1962, on CBS. Based on Damon Knight's 1950 short story, the episode was written by Rod Serling and directed by Richard L. Bare. It is considered one of the best episodes from the series, particularly for its final twist.

== Opening narration ==
Respectfully submitted for your perusal — a Kanamit. Height: a little over nine feet. Weight: in the neighborhood of three hundred and fifty pounds. Origin: unknown. Motives? Therein hangs the tale, for in just a moment, we're going to ask you to shake hands, figuratively, with a Christopher Columbus from another galaxy and another time. This is the Twilight Zone.

== Plot ==
A man named Michael Chambers lies on a cot in an otherwise empty, locked room. He grimly refuses a meal when it is offered to him by a voice on a loudspeaker, then begins to reflect on the circumstances that have led him into this situation.

The setting changes to several months earlier, on Earth. The Kanamits, a race of 9-foot-tall (2.7 m) aliens, land on Earth as the planet is beset by international crises. As the Secretary-General of the United Nations announces the landing at a news conference, one of the aliens arrives and addresses the assembled delegates and journalists using a mechanical voice. He states that his race's motive in coming to Earth is to provide humanitarian aid by sharing their advanced technology that can easily and inexpensively solve all energy and food shortages and prevent international warfare. After answering questions, the Kanamit departs without comment and leaves behind a book in his language; Chambers, a cryptographer working for the United States government, is pressed into service to decipher it.

International leaders express wariness of the Kanamits' uninvited arrival on Earth, but start to believe their claims of benevolence upon seeing their advanced technology at work. Patty, a member of Chambers' staff, translates the title of the book as To Serve Man, further bolstering public trust in the Kanamits. One member of the race submits to polygraph-monitored interrogation and is determined to be telling the truth.

The Kanamits deliver on their promise to turn the world into a Utopia, transforming barren deserts into productive agricultural land, and each nation is given an impenetrable force field that leads to the virtual disbandment of all militaries. Humans soon begin volunteering to travel to the Kanamits' home planet, which is described as a paradise, and the Kanamits set up embassies in every country on Earth and weigh all passengers boarding their ships. Even though Chambers' staff no longer have any real work to do, due to worldwide declarations of peace and the dissolution of the United States Armed Forces, Patty continues her efforts to decode the Kanamits' book, while Chambers decides to simply enjoy the newfound paradise and signs up for his own trip to the Kanamits' planet.

Some time later, as Chambers is boarding a Kanamit ship, Patty pushes through the waiting line and shouts for him not to go. She has successfully translated To Serve Man and discovered that it is not a book about humanitarian aid, but a cookbook. Chambers tries to flee, but a guard forces him onto the ship and closes the hatch so it can lift off.

In the present, a meal is delivered to Chambers through a small aperture in the wall and he angrily throws it across the room. A Kanamit picks up the food and encourages him to eat so that he will not lose weight. Chambers addresses the viewers directly to ask whether they have left Earth yet and remarking that the Kanamits will eventually cook and eat all of humanity. He then begins to eat his meal, ending his hunger strike and thus surrendering to the Kanamits.

== Closing narration ==
The recollections of one Michael Chambers, with appropriate flashbacks and soliloquy. Or, more simply stated, the evolution of man. The cycle of going from dust to dessert. The metamorphosis from being the ruler of a planet to an ingredient in someone's soup. It's tonight's bill of fare from the Twilight Zone.

== Cast ==
- Lloyd Bochner as Michael Chambers
- Richard Kiel as the Kanamits (all of whom appear alike)
- Susan Cummings as Patty
- Joseph Ruskin as Kanamit voice (uncredited)
- Hardie Albright as Secretary General
- Theodore Marcuse as Citizen Gregori
- Bartlett Robinson as Colonel #1
- Carleton Young as Colonel #2 (credited as Carlton Young)
- Nelson Olmsted as Scientist
- Robert Tafur as Senor Valdes
- Lomax Study as Leveque
- Jerry Fujikawa as Japanese Delegate (credited as J.H. Fujikawa)

== Production ==
The arriving Kanamit ship is shown as scenes extracted from The Day the Earth Stood Still, but with different sound; the departing Kanamit ship is shown as a scene extracted from Earth vs. the Flying Saucers, also with different sound.

== Critical response ==
TV Guide ranked the episode at number 11 on its list of the "100 Greatest Episodes of All Time" and ranked the ending as the "Greatest Twist of All Time". Time listed the episode among the "Top 10 Twilight Zone Episodes". Rolling Stone named the episode first on its list of the "25 Best Twilight Zone Episodes".

== Cultural influence ==
The episode is occasionally referenced in popular culture, usually with the line "It's a cookbook!" or some variation thereof. References or parodies can be found in such television series as Futurama, The Simpsons, and Buffy the Vampire Slayer; movies such as The Naked Gun 2½: The Smell of Fear, and Madagascar (The Naked Gun 2½: The Smell of Fear featured a tongue-in-cheek cameo by Lloyd Bochner, who played Michael Chambers in the TZ episode); the comic strip Mark Trail; and musical works by artists Nuclear Assault, Cattle Decapitation, Mono Puff, and El-P. A reference to the episode has even found its way into an unofficial emblem for a United States Air Force unit.

== Sequel ==
The 2020 Twilight Zone final episode "You Might Also Like", written and directed by Oz Perkins, serves as a thematic sequel to "To Serve Man", featuring the Kanamits, who are still learning about Earth's culture to plot further evil.
