= Time Enough =

- Short story by Damon Knight
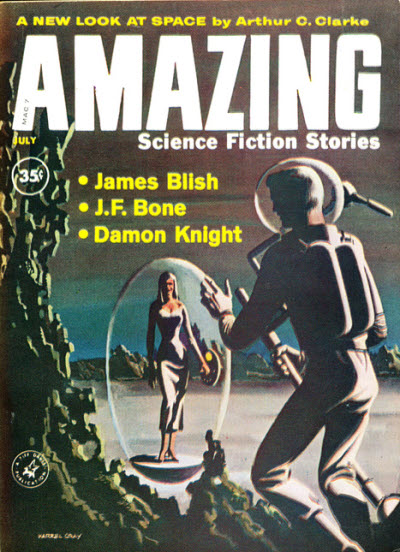
- Country: United States
- Language: English
- Genre: Science fiction

Publication
- Published in: Amazing Science Fiction Stories
- Publication type: Periodical
- Publisher: Ziff-Davis Publishing Company
- Media type: Print (Magazine, Hardback & Paperback)
- Publication date: July 1960

"Time Enough" (alternate title: "Enough Time") is a science fiction short story by American writer Damon Knight. It first appeared in the July 1960 issue of Amazing magazine and has since been reprinted twice, in Far Out (1961) and The Best of Damon Knight (1976).

== Synopsis ==
A psychiatrist of the future (1978) treats a young man, using a machine that causes him to relive an embarrassing incident from his childhood. The psychiatrist describes the treatment as follows:

"The past can be altered. The scholar can take his exam over again, the lover can propose once more, the words that were thought of too late can be spoken...It's like a game of cards. If you don't like the hand that is dealt to you, you can take another, and after that, another..."

At the end of the story, having failed once again to resolve the childhood incident in a satisfactory way, the client leaves, with the words, "There's always tomorrow, isn't there?"

== Background ==
About this story, Knight wrote

During an unproductive session at the typewriter in 1959, I said the hell with it and decided to go and lie down. While horizontal, with the dorsal muscles relaxed, I got the idea for "Time Enough," thus establishing a principle that I have followed successfully ever since: when you're not writing, get away from the typewriter.
