= To Serve Man (short story) =

1950 science fiction short story by Damon Knight

- Short story by Damon Knight
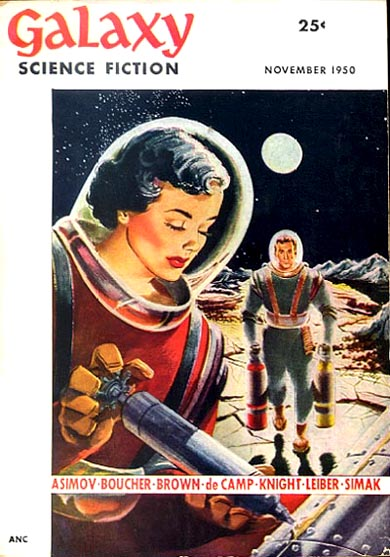
- Country: United States
- Language: English
- Genre: Science fiction

Publication
- Published in: Galaxy Science Fiction
- Publication type: Periodical
- Publisher: Galaxy Publishing Corporation
- Media type: Print (magazine, hardcover, and paperback)
- Publication date: November 1950

"To Serve Man" is a science fiction short story by American writer Damon Knight. It first appeared in the November 1950 issue of Galaxy Science Fiction and has been reprinted a number of times, including in Frontiers in Space (1955), Far Out (1961), and The Best of Damon Knight (1976).

== Synopsis ==
The story is set in the United States in a time that appears to be contemporaneous with the story's 1950 publication date. It is told in first-person narrative by a United Nations translator. The story opens at a special session of the UN where three alien emissaries are testifying that the purpose of their mission to Earth is to bring humans "the peace and plenty which we ourselves enjoy, and which we have in the past brought to other races throughout the galaxy". The aliens, who are large humanoid pigs with three fingers on each hand, soon supply Earth with cheap unlimited power, boundless supplies of food, and a device which disables all modern armies by suppressing all explosions, and they begin work on drugs for prolonging life. As a further token of friendship, they allow humans to visit their home planet via ten-year "exchange groups".

The narrator has trusted the emissaries from the time of their arrival, but his friend and fellow translator Grigori has not. Grigori dismisses any notion of disinterested altruism and is certain that the aliens have an ulterior motive underlying their actions. He is determined to discover what they stand to gain by helping humans and takes a job at the alien embassy to learn their language. This affords him access to an alien dictionary, and he later steals an alien book, hoping to translate it.

The narrator has also left the UN to work at the embassy, and the two determine that the book's title is How to Serve Man. Two weeks later, the narrator returns from a trip to find Grigori distraught, having discovered to his horror that the title is a double entendre. Grigori informs the narrator that he has translated the first paragraph of the book and has determined that it is not a treatise on serving humanity, but a cookbook.

== Awards ==
In 2001, the story was awarded a Retro Hugo Award as the "Best Short Story of 1950".

== Adaptations ==
Knight's story was adapted for use as a 1962 episode of the television series The Twilight Zone, in which the aliens are portrayed as 9 ft (2.7 m) tall humanoids with dome-like heads.

== See also ==
- Under the Skin, a novel by Michel Faber, which shares the theme of animalistic aliens farming humans for food.
- "From Gustible's Planet", a short story by Cordwainer Smith
- Bad Taste by Peter Jackson, a scifi comedy horror film where aliens intend to turn humanity into fast food.
