= The Last Word (Knight short story) =

- Short story by Damon Knight
- Country: United States
- Language: English
- Genre: Science fiction

Publication
- Published in: Satellite Science Fiction
- Publication type: Periodical
- Publisher: Renown Publications
- Media type: Print (Magazine, Hardback & Paperback)
- Publication date: February 1957

"The Last Word" is a science fiction short story by American writer Damon Knight. It first appeared in the February 1957 issue of Satellite Science Fiction and has been reprinted twice, in Far Out (1961) and The Best of Damon Knight (1976).

== Synopsis ==
The story is told in first person, by a narrator who, it soon becomes clear, is Satan. He briefly recounts his history on Earth and tells how he directed people toward destructive activity, for instance by teaching them how to make gunpowder. Now the final war is over, and almost everyone has been killed. Satan comes across a man and a woman, the last survivors, who are inside a transparent dome that keeps out the contaminated air. The two people recognize Satan for who he is; Satan is troubled by their calm certitude and asks about the elaborate machine that he sees inside their dome. He is told that it is a time machine, and that they are about to go "back to the beginning" to start over, this time without him:

The woman said, "You've won Armageddon, but you've lost Earth."

I knew the answer to that, of course, but she was a woman and had the last word.

I gestured toward the purple darkness outside. "Lost Earth? What do you call this?"

She poised her hand on the switch.

"Hell," she said.

And I have remembered her voice, through ten thousand lonely years.

== Background ==
About this story, Knight wrote

"The Last Word" is one of three stories I have written using orthodox Christian materials - God, the devil, etc. - which proves that my childhood training had some use after all.
