= Masters of Darkness III =

- Cover of first edition
- Author: edited by Dennis Etchison
- Language: English
- Series: Masters of Darkness
- Genre: Horror short stories
- Publisher: Tor Books
- Publication date: 1991
- Publication place: United States
- Media type: Print (paperback)
- Pages: 332 pp.
- ISBN: 0-812-51766-0
- Preceded by: Masters of Darkness II

Masters of Darkness III is an anthology of horror short works edited by Dennis Etchison, the third and last in the "Masters of Darkness" series. It was first published in paperback by Tor Books in May 1991. It was gathered together with the previous two volumes of the series into the omnibus anthology The Complete Masters of Darkness issued by Underwood-Miller in the same year.

The book collects fifteen novelettes and short stories by various authors, together with an "author’s note" after each story and a general preface by the editor.

== Contents ==
- "Preface" (Dennis Etchison)
- "The Secret" (Jack Vance)
- "The Patter of Tiny Feet" (Nigel Kneale)
- "The Tenant" (Avram Davidson)
- "Hallowe'en's Child" (James Herbert)
- "After the Funeral" (Hugh B. Cave)
- "But at My Back I Always Hear" (David Morrell)
- "The Whisperer" (Brian Lumley)
- "Doppelgänger" (R. Chetwynd-Hayes)
- "The Master of the Hounds" (Algis Budrys)
- "Judgment Day" (L. Sprague de Camp)
- "In the Hills, the Cities" (Clive Barker)
- "Jamboree" (Jack Williamson)
- "Family" (Joyce Carol Oates)
- "Twilight of the Dawn" (Dean R. Koontz)
- "The Woman in the Room" (Stephen King)
