= The Enemy (short story) =

- Short story by Damon Knight
- Country: United States
- Language: English
- Genre: Science fiction

Publication
- Published in: Venture Science Fiction
- Publication type: Periodical
- Publisher: Mercury Press
- Media type: Print (Magazine, Hardback & Paperback)

"The Enemy" is a science fiction short story by American writer Damon Knight. It first appeared in the January 1958 issue of Venture magazine and has been reprinted twice, in the books Far Out (1961) and The Best of Damon Knight (1976).

== Synopsis ==
Fifteen-year-old Zael, who was born in space, is left alone on a planetoid to begin mining operations. She belongs to a culture that centuries ago was driven from the Earth. While charting mineral deposits, Zael discovers an alien who has been held inert, presumably for thousands of years, in a metal globe. Zael accidentally causes the globe to open and the alien emerges, upsetting her tractor. Zael realizes that the creature is hostile, and speculates that it has been in suspended animation since a war with humans in the distant past. The creature starts building what appears to be a spaceship; Zael destroys it. Both Zael and the alien realize that they will die of exposure. They begin to return to Zael's bubble house, helping each other across the fissures. Just before reaching the dome, the alien pierces Zael's space suit and leaves her to die. Her last vision is of the alien escaping from the planetoid in her escape pod.

== Background ==
About this story, Knight wrote

"The Enemy" is one of two stories that I wrote when I was having some eye trouble and thought I might go blind...Just think, if I had been born blind, I might have written a lot more like this.
