= Judgment Day (short story) =

- Short story by L. Sprague de Camp
- Frank Kelly Freas's illustration of the story in Astounding Science Fiction
- Country: United States
- Language: English
- Genre: Science fiction

Publication
- Published in: Astounding Science Fiction
- Publisher: Street & Smith Publications, Inc.
- Media type: Print (Magazine)
- Publication date: February, 1955

"Judgment Day" is an apocalyptic science fiction story by American writer L. Sprague de Camp. It was first published in the magazine Astounding Science Fiction for August, 1955, and first appeared in book form in the anthology The Best Science Fiction Stories and Novels: 1956 (Frederick Fell, 1956). It later appeared in the de Camp collections A Gun for Dinosaur and Other Imaginative Tales (Doubleday, 1963), and The Best of L. Sprague de Camp (Doubleday, 1978), as well as the anthologies Great Science-Fiction (Three Star Books, 1965), A Science Fiction Argosy (Simon & Schuster, 1972), and Masters of Darkness III (Tor Books, 1991). The story has also been translated into German.

== Plot summary ==
The narrative is told in the first person as an interior monologue of the narrator. Physicist Wade Ormont has serendipitously stumbled on a hitherto unsuspected variety of nuclear fission involving iron that could "blow the entire crust [of the world] off with one big poof," a discovery he agonizes on whether to report. There is no danger of any other researcher beating him to the punch, as the find was accidental, based on a quirk of physics to which no current theory points, and is unlikely to be arrived at independently by someone else. Breaking the news would certainly make his reputation, even if, as he is sure would be the case, the government would attempt to suppress it.

There is powerful reason for him to maintain his silence. His discovery would make production of a weapon based on its principles so easy as to render universal holocaust inevitable, as at some point some petty country would be bound to engage in nuclear blackmail and destroy the world. In effect, Ormont holds the fate of mankind in his hands.

Ruminating over his choice, Ormont reflects on his past life. A weakling and loner, he had grown up bullied and abused by his peers despite, or perhaps because of, his brilliance. As a result, he became a friendless loner and outcast, so deficient in social skills even his wife eventually left him. He now cares so little for his fellow human beings that their future and his own short-term self-interest seem evenly balanced in his mind. After all, he would most likely be dead of natural causes before some lunatic blew up the Earth.

It is actions of a group of young neighborhood delinquents that tips the balance. After they maliciously vandalize his house, Ormont comes to the realization that he truly hates the human race, and these examples of it in particular, and can only be happy if they are made to pay. Publication would thus be an act of ultimate vengeance for all he has suffered, and on all who have made him suffer. He decides to write his report.

== Reception ==
"Judgment Day," described by one reviewer as "the ultimate Revenge story," is a departure from de Camp's usually light and breezy work, a "disturbing story" both popular on initial publication and "presag[ing] by some forty-five plus years the Columbine High School massacre" and similar incidents. Another commenter has seen parallels in its scenario to the dilemma of present-day software engineers uncovering security holes in software programs, in which publicizing the problem could encourage both speedier patching and hacker exploitation.

P. Schuyler Miller noted that "[t]he scientist of 'Judgment Day,' who judges mankind as it has judged him, lives not very far away." Avram Davidson, who had grown disappointed with de Camp's short stories on the grounds that they played great ideas for laughs, found this tale of "an embittered scientist who—with good reason—hates the whole human race" the "sole exception ... it is so authentic-sounding that one could scream."

== Relation to other works ==
De Camp also featured negative consequences of juvenile delinquency in other stories of this period. He dealt with the theme of teens disrupting interplanetary relations in "Let's Have Fun" (1957), in which the delinquents endanger the young of aliens, and "The Egg" (1956), in which youngsters are endangered by alien offspring rather than vice versa.
