= The Museum of Horrors =

- First edition cover
- Editor: Dennis Etchison
- Cover artist: Steve McAfee
- Language: English
- Genre: Fantasy, horror
- Publisher: Leisure Books
- Publication date: October 2001
- Publication place: United States
- Media type: Print (hardback)
- Pages: 374
- ISBN: 0-8439-4928-7
- OCLC: 48227715

The Museum of Horrors is an anthology of horror stories edited by Dennis Etchison. It was published by Leisure Books in October 2001. The anthology contains eighteen stories from members of the Horror Writers Association. The anthology itself won the 2002 World Fantasy Award for Best Anthology.

== Contents ==
- "The Museum of Dr. Moses" by Joyce Carol Oates
- "Worse Than Bones" by Ramsey Campbell
- "King of Outer Space" by Peter Atkins
- "Piano Bar Blues" by Melanie Tem
- "Those Vanished I Recognize" by Tom Piccirilli
- "Inland, Shoreline" by Darren O. Godfrey
- "The Window" by Joel Lane
- "Author, Author" by Gordon Linzner
- "Hammerhead" by Richard Laymon
- "Imbroglio" by Conrad Williams
- "Transorbital Love Probe" by Thom Metzger
- "The Impressionists in Winter" by Susan Fry
- "Whose Ghosts These Are" by Charles L. Grant
- "Perdido: A Fragment from a Work in Progress (excerpt)" by Peter Straub
- "In Real Life" by William F. Nolan
- "Pound Riots in Fragrant Harbour" by Lisa Morton
- "Apologia" by Robert Devereaux
- "The Bird Catcher" by S. P. Somtow
- "Notes on the Contributors (The Horror Writers Association Presents The Museum of Horrors)" by Dennis Etchison
- "About the HWA (The Horror Writers Association Presents The Museum of Horrors)" by Dennis Etchison

== Reprints ==
- Leisure Books, June 2003.
