= A Science Fiction Argosy =

Science fiction short work anthology

- Cover of first edition
- Author: edited by Damon Knight
- Cover artist: Wendell Minor
- Language: English
- Genre: Science fiction short stories
- Publisher: Simon & Schuster
- Publication date: 1972
- Publication place: United States
- Media type: Print (hardcover)
- Pages: 828 pp.
- ISBN: 0-671-21126-9

A Science Fiction Argosy is an anthology of science fiction short works edited by Damon Knight. It was first published in hardcover by Simon & Schuster in March 1972; a book club edition issued by the same publisher together with the Science Fiction Book Club followed in May of the same year. The first British edition was issued by Gollancz in hardcover in April 1973.

The book collects twenty-six novels, novellas, novelettes and short stories by various authors, together with an introduction by the editor.

== Contents ==
- "Introduction" (Damon Knight)
- "Green Thoughts" (John Collier)
- "The Red Queen's Race" (Isaac Asimov)
- "The Cure" (Henry Kuttner and C. L. Moore)
- "Consider Her Ways" (John Wyndham)
- "An Ornament to His Profession" (Charles L. Harness)
- "The Third Level" (Jack Finney)
- "One Ordinary Day, with Peanuts" (Shirley Jackson)
- "Bernie the Faust" (William Tenn)
- "Light of Other Days" (Bob Shaw)
- "The Game of Rat and Dragon" (Cordwainer Smith)
- "Becalmed in Hell" (Larry Niven)
- "Apology to Inky" (Robert M. Green, Jr.)
- The Demolished Man (Alfred Bester)
- "Day Million" (Frederik Pohl)
- "Manna" (Peter Phillips)
- "Can You Feel Anything When I Do This?" (Robert Sheckley)
- "Somerset Dreams" (Kate Wilhelm)
- "He Walked Around the Horses" (H. Beam Piper)
- "Rump-Titty-Titty-Tum-TAH-Tee" (Fritz Leiber)
- "Sea Wrack" (Edward Jesby)
- "Man in His Time" (Brian W. Aldiss)
- "Four Brands of Impossible" (Norman Kagan)
- "Built Up Logically" (Howard Schoenfeld)
- "Judgment Day" (L. Sprague de Camp)
- "Journeys End" (Poul Anderson)
- More Than Human (Theodore Sturgeon)
