= Dennis Etchison =

American writer (1943–2019)

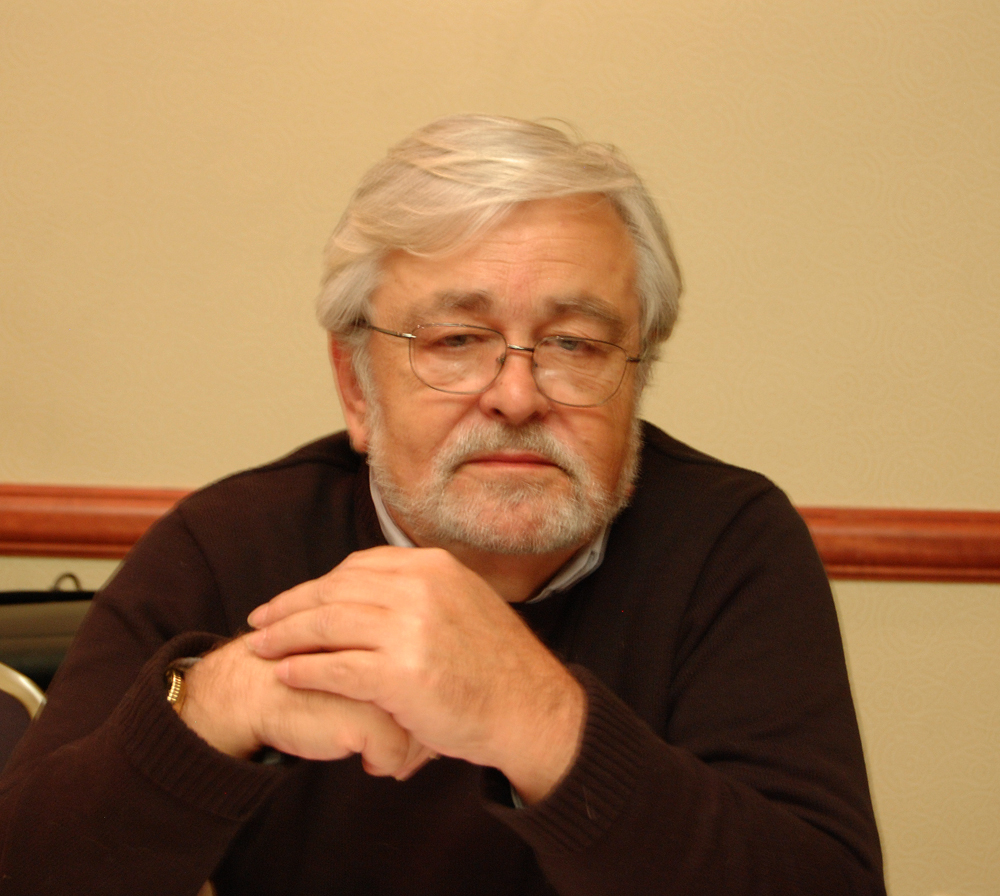
- Etchison at the 2008 World Horror Convention in Salt Lake City.
- Born: March 30, 1943; Stockton, California
- Died: May 29, 2019 (aged 76)
- Occupation: Writer
- Writing career
- Genres: Fantasy; Horror
- Notable awards: British Fantasy Award (1982, 1987, 1994), World Fantasy Award (1982, 1993, 2002)

Dennis William Etchison (March 30, 1943 – May 29, 2019) was an American writer and editor of fantasy and horror fiction. Etchison referred to his own work as "rather dark, depressing, almost pathologically inward fiction about the individual in relation to the world". Stephen King has called Dennis Etchison "one hell of a fiction writer" and he has been called "the most original living horror writer in America" (The Penguin Encyclopedia of Horror and the Supernatural).

While he has achieved some acclaim as a novelist, it is Etchison's work in the short story format that is especially well-regarded by critics and genre fans, as with his debut collection The Dark Country (1982), selected as one of the 100 best horror books. He was President of the Horror Writers Association from 1992 to 1994. He was a multi-award winner, having won the British Fantasy Award three times for fiction, and the World Fantasy Award, once for short fiction and twice for anthologies he edited.

== Early life ==
Etchison was born in Stockton, California. An only child, the earliest years of his life were spent growing up in a household devoid of men (World War II was still raging across the globe). Etchison has remarked that he was greatly spoiled during his early years and largely isolated from other children. This sense of isolation and need to interact with society would later form the themes to many of his works.

In his early years, Etchison also became an avid wrestling fan. Fascinated by the interplay between good and evil, he would regularly attend shows at the Olympic Auditorium with his father. His passion for the sport continued to the end of his life, and he often wrote under the pen name "The Pro" for the wrestling publication Rampage.

In junior high and high school, Etchison wrote for the school paper and won numerous essay contests. He discovered Ray Bradbury during this time and emulated him before developing his own style. On the last day of his junior year in high school, Etchison began writing his first short story. Entitled "Odd Boy Out," it involved a group of teenagers in the woods. He began submitting it to numerous science-fiction magazines but received rejection slips each time.

He then remembered Ray Bradbury once suggesting that a writer should start by submitting their work to the least likely market. So he submitted his short story to a gentlemen's magazine called Escapade, and, a few weeks later, he received their acceptance and a check for $125.

== Career ==
=== Film studies and screen work ===
Etchison has written professionally in many genres since 1960. He attended UCLA film school in the 1960s and has written many screenplays as yet unproduced, from his own works as well as those of Ray Bradbury ("The Fox and the Forest") and Stephen King ("The Mist"). He rewrote a Colin Wilson script, The Ogre, and completed a screenplay based on his own short story "The Late Shift". He co-wrote a story for the Logan's Run TV series, "The Thunder Gods" (printed in The Circuit 2, No 3).

In 1983, Etchison was asked by Stephen King to be the film consultant/historian on the paperback edition of King's 1981 book on the horror genre, Danse Macabre.

In 1984, ZBS Media produced a 90-minute radio version of Stephen King's The Mist, based on Etchison's script. A film, "Killing Time", was made by Patrick Aumont and Damian Harris (Graymatter Productions) from Etchison's story "The Late Shift".

In 1985, Etchison served as staff writer for the HBO TV series The Hitchhiker.

On December 2, 1986, John Carpenter teamed up with Etchison to write a script to Halloween 4: The Return of Michael Myers. The script would have primarily focused on Tommy and Lindsey (the kids from the first Halloween movie) who were teenagers. Halloween is banned in Haddonfield. Dr. Loomis and Michael Myers both died in the explosion, but Michael returned as a spirit and he grew 12 feet tall at the climax in the Lost River Drive in theater. Dennis wanted a poster of Halloween 4 depicting Michael Myers bursting from a patch of pumpkins which match the scene where Michael killed D'Arcy at a pumpkin patch.

"Halloween was banned in Haddonfield and I think that the basic idea was that if you tried to suppress something, it would only rear its head more strongly. By the very [attempt] of trying to erase the memory of Michael Myers, [the teenagers] were going to ironically bring him back into existence."
— Dennis Etchison on his idea for Halloween 4.

However, franchise producer Moustapha Akkad rejected the Etchison script, calling it "too cerebral" and insisting that any new Halloween sequel must feature Myers as a flesh and blood killer. Etchison said, "I received a call from Debra Hill and she said, 'Dennis, I just wanted you to know that John and I have sold our interest in the title 'Halloween' and unfortunately, your script was not part of the deal." Carpenter and Hill signed all of their rights away to Akkad, who gained ownership.

=== Fiction ===
Etchison's fiction has appeared regularly since 1961 in a wide range of publications including Cavalier, The Oneota Review, Rogue, Seventeen, Statement, Fantastic Stories, Mike Shayne Mystery Magazine, The Magazine of Fantasy and Science Fiction, Mystery Monthly, Escapade, Adelina, Comet (Germany), Fiction (France), Universe (France), Fantasy Tales, Weirdbook, Whispers, Fantasy Book and in such anthologies as Orbit, New Writings in SF, Rod Serling's Other Worlds, Prize Stories from Seventeen, The Pseudo-People, and The Future is Now. His stories can also be found in many of the major horror and dark fantasy anthologies including Frights, Dark Forces, Terrors, New Terrors, Horrors, Fears, Nightmares, Shadows, Whispers, Night Chills, Death, World Fantasy Awards, Mad Scientists, Year's Best Horror Stories, The Dodd, Mead Gallery of Horror, Midnight and others.

His first short story collection, The Dark Country, was published in 1982. Its title story received the World Fantasy Award (tied with Stephen King), as well as the British Fantasy Award for Best Collection of that year – the first time one writer received both major awards for a single work.

Etchison nearly had his first short story collection appear eleven years earlier. In 1971 he sold Powell Books, a low-budget Los Angeles based publisher who published Karl Edward Wagner's Darkness Weaves, a collection of his science fiction and fantasy under the title The Night of the Eye. The book went into galley proofs and beyond – Etchison received a cover proof, and ISBN 0-8427-1014-0 was assigned. On the eve of its publication, Powell Publications went bankrupt. Etchison would wait over a decade before his actual first collection The Dark Country would appear, to critical acclaim.

Several more collections have been published since, including a career retrospective, Talking in the Dark (2001), which consists of stories personally selected by the author. He was nominated for the British Fantasy Award for "The Late Shift" (1981), and as well as winning the ward in 1982 for "The Dark Country", has won it since for Best Short Story, for "The Olympic Runner" (1986) and "The Dog Park" (1994).

Etchison's first novel (discounting two pseudonymous erotic novels), The Shudder, was slated for publication in 1980; he finally withdrew it when the editor demanded what he felt were unreasonable changes in the manuscript. A portion of the novel appeared as one selection in A Fantasy Reader, the book of the Seventh World Fantasy Convention in 1981; the full novel remains unpublished.

Writing under the pseudonym of "Jack Martin", he published popular novelizations of the films Halloween II (1981), Halloween III: Season of the Witch (1982), and Videodrome (1983). Under his own name, Etchison's novels include Darkside (1986), Shadowman (1993), and California Gothic (1995), as well as the novelization of John Carpenter's The Fog (1980).

Etchison periodically taught classes in creative writing at UCLA.

=== Editorial work ===
As editor, Etchison has received two World Fantasy Awards for Best Anthology, for MetaHorror (1993) and The Museum of Horrors (2002). His other anthologies include the critically acclaimed Cutting Edge (1986), Gathering The Bones (2003) (edited with Ramsey Campbell and Jack Dann), and the Masters of Darkness series (three volumes).

=== Radio work ===
In 2002, Etchison adapted nearly 100 episodes of the original The Twilight Zone TV series for a CBS radio series hosted by Stacy Keach. The programmes were commercially released on audio CDs. Etchison was one of the writers on the audio series Fangoria's Dreadtime Stories, hosted by Malcolm McDowell. These horrific stories are available on CD and via digital download at iTunes, Audible and through other outlets.

=== Essays and other works ===
- The Book of Lists: Horror – 2008 (contributor)
- Etchison contributed a foreword to George Clayton Johnson's All of Us Are Dying and Other Stories (Subterranean Press, 1999).

== Death ==
A message posted to Etchison's Facebook page reported that the author had died on May 28, 2019; no cause of death was given. Locus magazine published Etchison's obituary on May 29, 2019. He was survived by his wife Kristina.

== Critical reception ==
The late Karl Edward Wagner proclaimed him "the finest writer of psychological horror this genre has ever produced." Charles L. Grant called Etchison "the best short story writer in the field today, bar none."

Critical studies of Etchison's work can be found in Darrell Schweitzer's Discovering Modern Horror Fiction, Richard Bleiler's Supernatural Fiction Writers and "Dennis Etchison: Spanning the Genres" in S. T. Joshi's book The Evolution of the Weird Tale (2004), 178–89.

== Bibliography ==
=== Novels ===
- Stud Row (LA: Oasis Books, 1969) (written as "H.L. Mensch" by Etchison & Eric Cohen)
- Loves & Intrigues of Damon (LA: Oasis Books, 1969) (written as "Ben Dover") (based in part upon an idea by Charles Beaumont)
- The Shudder (Coward, McCann, Geoghegan, 1980) ISBN 0-698-10991-0. Despite Etchison receiving an advance, and the book being assigned an ISBN, the novel was not published; it was withdrawn by the author (see details above).
- The Fog (1980)
- Halloween II (1981) (written as "Jack Martin")
- Halloween III (1982) (written as "Jack Martin")
- Videodrome (1983) (written as "Jack Martin")
- Darkside (1986)
- Shadowman (1993)
- California Gothic (1995)
- Double Edge (1997)

=== Short story collections ===
- The Dark Country (1982)
- Red Dreams (1984)
- The Blood Kiss (1987)
- The Death Artist (2000)

=== Retrospective collections ===
- Talking in the Dark (2001) (plus one new story, "Red Dog Down"). This volume marked the 40th anniversary of Etchison's first professional first short story sale.
- Fine Cuts (e-collection, Scorpius Digital, 2006) (Hollywood-themed volume plus one previously uncollected story, "Got To Kill Them All")
- Got To Kill Them All and Other stories (CD Publications, 2008) (plus three previously uncollected stories, "One of Us", "In a Silent Way" and "My Present Wife", together with "Red Dog Down" and "Got To Kill Them All", previously included in prior retrospectives)

=== As editor ===
- Cutting Edge (1986)
- Masters of Darkness (1986)
- Masters of Darkness II (1988)
- Lord John Ten (1988)
- Masters of Darkness III (1991)
- The Complete Masters of Darkness (1991)
- MetaHorror (1992). This anthology won the World Fantasy Award for Best Anthology, 1993.
- The Museum of Horrors (Leisure Books, 2001). This anthology won the World Fantasy Award for Best Anthology, 2002.
- Gathering The Bones (2003) (edited with Ramsey Campbell and Jack Dann)

=== Other works ===
- The Walk: A Tor.Com Original (2014)

== Select awards and honors ==
Etchison was nominated for and also won multiple awards for his various works.

Year	Work	Organization	Award title, Category	Result	Refs
1977	"It Only Comes Out at Night"	World Fantasy Convention	World Fantasy Award, Best Short Fiction	Nominated	
1981	"The Late Shift"	British Fantasy Society	British Fantasy Award, Best Short Fiction	Nominated	
1982	"The Dark Country"	British Fantasy Society	British Fantasy Award, Best Short Story	Won	
1982	"The Dark Country"	World Fantasy Convention	World Fantasy Award, Best Short Fiction	Won	
1983	"Deathtracks"	World Fantasy Convention	World Fantasy Award, Best Short Fiction	Nominated	
1983	The Dark Country	World Fantasy Convention	World Fantasy Award, Best Anthology/Collection	Nominated	
1987	"The Olympic Runner"	British Fantasy Society	British Fantasy Award, Best Short Story	Won	
1987	Cutting Edge	World Fantasy Convention	World Fantasy Award, Best Anthology/Collection	Nominated	
1988	The Blood Kiss	Horror Writers Association	Bram Stoker Award, Superior Achievement in a Fiction Collection	Nominated	
1989	The Blood Kiss	World Fantasy Convention	World Fantasy Award, Best Collection	Nominated	
1993	"The Dog Park"	Horror Writers Association	Bram Stoker Award, Superior Achievement in Short Fiction	Nominated	
1997	"The Dead Cop"	World Fantasy Convention	World Fantasy Award, Best Short Fiction	Nominated	
1998	"Inside the Cackle Factory"	International Horror Guild	International Horror Guild Award, Best Short Form	Nominated	
2000	"The Death Artist"	International Horror Guild	International Horror Guild Award, Best Collection	Nominated	
2001	The Museum of Horrors	International Horror Guild	International Horror Guild Award, Best Anthology	Nominated	
2001	Talking in the Dark	International Horror Guild	International Horror Guild Award, Best Collection	Nominated	
2002	The Museum of Horrors	World Fantasy Convention	World Fantasy Award, Best Anthology	Won	
2002	Talking in the Dark	World Fantasy Convention	World Fantasy Award, Best Collection	Nominated	
2003	Gathering the Bones	Horror Writers Association	Bram Stoker Award, Superior Achievement in an Anthology	Nominated	
2003	Gathering the Bones	International Horror Guild	International Horror Guild Award, Best Anthology	Nominated	
2004	Gathering the Bones	World Fantasy Convention	World Fantasy Award, Best Anthology	Nominated	
2009	Got to Kill Them All & Other Stories	Horror Writers Association	Bram Stoker Award, Superior Achievement in a Fiction Collection	Nominated	
2016		Horror Writers Association	Bram Stoker Award, Lifetime Achievement	Won	

== See also ==
- List of horror fiction writers
