= Sister Planet =

1959 short story by Poul Anderson

"Sister Planet" is a science fiction short story by Poul Anderson. It was first published in Satellite Science Fiction in 1959 and has been anthologised many times. It was included in The Golden Age of Science Fiction.

== Plot ==
In the near future, Earth society is breaking down, with wars, violence and over-population the norm. On the other hand, a colony has been established on Venus, an ocean world with no land masses and no human-breathable atmosphere. A small trade and research base exists, which trades various items of goods with the aquatic population. They are air-breathing and known to the humans as cetoids. One is known to them as Oscar. Although Oscar and others exchange the goods for firegems, which are highly valued on Earth, no real attempt has been made to establish how intelligent the cetoids are. The source of the firegems is also unknown.

Two of the researchers, Dykstra and Cheng-tung, have been investigating the geology of Venus. The conclude that the planet is in many ways similar to Earth, and could be terraformed and made eventually inhabitable by humans. An oxygen atmosphere could be created and land masses formed. However, the native population would be destroyed in the process.

One of the researchers, Hawthorne, a keen diver, has established close relations with Oscar, who guides him into the depths of the ocean. He sees elaborate and artistically designed creations of coralite, but with no indication of what they might represent. He realises that if the planet is terraformed, not only will an obviously intelligent species be destroyed but all this fantastic artwork will be lost.

Although it is decided not to continue with the terraforming project, and even to destroy the research before it can be reported to Earth, Hawthorne knows what he must do to stop a repeat of the research by others. He sabotages the colony, leaving no-one alive but him, and shoots many cetoids, to make them distrust and fear humans. As he recognizes Oscar's dead body, he thinks to himself "Oh God. Please Exist. Please make a hell for me."
