= Extempore (short story) =

- Short story by Damon Knight
- Country: United States
- Language: English
- Genre: Science fiction

Publication
- Published in: Infinity Science Fiction
- Publication type: Periodical
- Publisher: Royal Publications Incorporated
- Media type: Print (Magazine, Hardback & Paperback)
- Publication date: August 1956

"Extempore" (alternate title "The Beach Where Time Began") is a science fiction short story by American writer Damon Knight. It first appeared in the August 1956 issue of Infinity Science Fiction and has been reprinted twice, in Far Out (1961) and The Best of Damon Knight (1976).

== Synopsis ==
Albert Rossi, a New York dishwasher, learns to travel through time. Once started, he continues at an accelerated pace, continuing until the end of time and then starting over. By an effort of will he manages to stop at a "scarlet beach with its golden laughing people". But he is now frozen in time forever and appears to the beachcombers as a rock-hard, immobile statue.

== Background ==
About this story, Knight wrote

Here is another of my time stories, put together out of bits and pieces of Far Rockaway, Milne, Einstein, etc. (I don't see why the speculations of modern physicists shouldn't be used as incantations.) I don't think "Extempore" is terribly probable, but see for yourself.
