= Thing of Beauty (short story) =

- Short story by Damon Knight
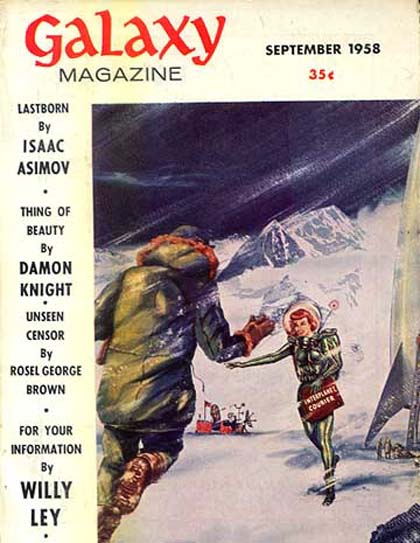
- Country: United States
- Language: English
- Genre: Science fiction

Publication
- Published in: Galaxy Science Fiction
- Publication type: Periodical
- Publisher: Galaxy Publishing Corporation
- Media type: Print (magazine, hardback & paperback)
- Publication date: September 1958

"Thing of Beauty" is a science fiction short story by American writer Damon Knight. It first appeared in the September 1958 issue of Galaxy magazine and has been reprinted three times, in Far Out (1961), The Sixth Galaxy Reader (1962), and The Best of Damon Knight (1976).

== Synopsis ==
One morning, a group of men in tight purple clothing make a delivery to the house of Gordon Fish in Southern California. It is a machine, the controls of which are labeled in an unknown language. By trial and error, Fish discovers that the machine produces high-quality drawings of people and things. Fish enters one of the drawings in an artistic competition, claiming that it was drawn by a nephew. It wins, but to receive the full prize money, the artist is required to paint the image on a wall. Fish convinces a friend to carry out the task. Fish continues to try to find ways to make money from the machine; he poses as an art teacher and takes on a young woman as a student. As time goes on, he notices that the variety of the images being produced by the machine becomes smaller and smaller. An operating manual came with the machine; he sends it to be translated, and learns that the language is Swedish. He discovers that he has systematically (but inadvertently) been removing images from storage in the machine each time he produces a picture.

Knight's short story anticipated, by roughly 64 years, an actual event. In the 2022 Colorado State Fair, an image created with the artificial intelligence program Midjourney won a blue ribbon. As in the Knight story, the judges did not realize that the image was created by machine.
