= Old Hundredth (short story) =

1963 science fiction short story by Brian Aldiss

"Old Hundredth" is a science fiction short story by British writer Brian Aldiss. It was first published in Airs of the Earth in 1963 and has been anthologised many times. It was included in The Golden Age of Science Fiction.

== Plot ==
In the far distant future, the Moon has left Earth; Earth and Venus orbit each other. Humans have left Earth, but the planet is inhabited by a mixture of animals and Impures; intelligent creatures created by human experimenters on Venus.

Dandi, a giant sloth-like creature, wanders the planet. She is the ward of, and mentally linked to, her Mentor, a giant and ancient dolphin that lives in an underwater cell. Dandi is an expert in the musicolumns, insubstantial remains of the psyches of people that react musically when intelligent life is near.

Dandi returns to her home, the crumbling remains of a human settlement, where she encounters a bear, one of few creatures than retain human-like aggressive behaviour. Her Mentor wishes her to kill the bear, but Dandi refuses and the bear escapes.

Now rejected by her Mentor, Dandi wishes to die, and returns to the wilderness. She dissolves into the form of a musicolumn. She is able to choose what music she will play when approached by intelligent beings - it is the Old Hundred; All creatures that on Earth do dwell.
