= You're Another =

- Short story by Damon Knight
- Country: United States
- Language: English
- Genre: Science fiction

Publication
- Published in: The Magazine of Fantasy and Science Fiction
- Publication type: Periodical
- Publisher: Mercury Press
- Media type: Print (Magazine, Hardback & Paperback)
- Publication date: June 1955

"You're Another" is a science fiction short story by American writer Damon Knight. It first appeared in the June 1955 issue of The Magazine of Fantasy and Science Fiction and has been reprinted a number of times, including in the 1961 collection Far Out.

The story contains perhaps the earliest fictional depiction of what is now called reality television.

== Synopsis ==
Johnny Bornish is a young painter in New York city who is plagued by bad luck. He is "the kind of person who gets his shirttail caught in zippers, is trapped by elevators and revolving doors, and trips on pebbles." An acquaintance, Duke, a rogue and ladies' man, suggests that Johnny take a trip to Florida and lends him fifty dollars. At the airport, Johnny realizes that his troubles started on the day ten years ago when he found a "Japanese coin" in high school. He attempts to get rid of the coin but it somehow is returned to him each time; finally he crunches it in a hinged counter door and runs for the plane. After takeoff, he sees the coin, inching up the airplane aisle toward him. It jumps into his hand. The passenger next to him becomes alarmed; Johnny realizes that he has seen this man before, and that he was present during many of his worst mishaps. An object, like a pince-nez, leaps from the man's pocket, joining with the coin. The man urges Johnny to hand the device back to him, but Johnny finds that by twitching the device, his surroundings suddenly change, which causes the man considerable distress. Johnny realizes that the coin was a tracking device, and the object in the man's pocket was able to change reality; now the two devices have merged and are unstable. By continuing to twitch the device, Johnny finally forces the man to reveal what is happening:

"It's a livie," the dark man said, pronouncing the first i long. His voice was resigned and dull.

"A what?"

"Livie. Like movies. You know. You're an actor."

"What is this now?" said Johnny uneasily. "I'm a painter. What do you mean, I'm an ac---"

"You're an actor, playing a painter!" said the dark man. "You actors! Dumb cows! You're an actor! Understand? It's a livie."

They are suddenly transported to the future, to an enormous movie set. The director explains that the past is continually being recreated as a form of entertainment; Johnny was the "star" of a comedy show set in 1950's New York. He reveals that the show was nearing its conclusion, and that in the final episode, Duke would use Johnny's apartment to murder Duke's girlfriend and pin the crime on Johnny. Johnny convinces the director to change the script, making Johnny the hero and Duke the comedic relief. Johnny is sent back to the present, where he surprises Duke just as he is about to enter Johnny's apartment. As Johnny starts up the stairs, Duke says "Johnny, my boy, you're a character."

Johnny looked down at him for a moment. "You're another," he said.

== See also ==
- Simulated reality
