= The Quest for Saint Aquin =

- Short story by Anthony Boucher
- Country: USA
- Language: English
- Genre: Science fiction

Publication
- Published in: New Tales of Space and Time
- Media type: Print (anthology)
- Publication date: 1951

"The Quest for Saint Aquin" is a science fiction short story by American writer Anthony Boucher (1911–1968), originally published in 1951 in New Tales of Space and Time.

"The Quest for Saint Aquin" was among the stories selected in 1970 by the Science Fiction Writers of America as one of the best science fiction short stories published before the creation of the Nebula Awards. As such, it was published in The Science Fiction Hall of Fame Volume One, 1929-1964. It was also selected by the English novelist and critic Kingsley Amis in 1981 as the first story in his The Golden Age of Science Fiction: An Anthology.

== Plot summary ==
The Earth of one thousand years hence has both post-apocalyptic elements (radiation/fallout has rendered some regions uninhabitable, roads have deteriorated to un-usability, vast amounts of historical knowledge have been lost) and super-tech elements (robots proliferate, interplanetary travel is routine, two other planets have been colonized). Religion has been banned by the ruling "Technarchy" and the Catholic Church has gone underground, relying on secret cells and symbols as in the days of the early church. The central character is a crypto-priest named Thomas who is charged by the crypto-pope with finding and reporting on the final resting place of a semi-legendary figure called Aquin. The mysterious Aquin had been an evangelist of great power who converted all those who listened to him preach, and his body allegedly did not deteriorate after his death. The Pope believes that this miracle, if true, will be a powerful tool in winning new converts.

Thomas is provided with an intelligent multi-terrain transport vehicle called a robass ("robotic ass"), to assist him in locating and visiting Aquin's tomb. To Thomas's surprise, this robot can talk and is theologically literate. It cynically tries to persuade him, for example, to abandon his quest since he had not been asked to find Aquin, but rather to report that he had so that the Pope can begin the process of canonization. Thomas resists the robass' arguments, though he does succumb to the temptation to drink and carouse with a pretty half-Martian barmaid in a village. The villagers discover that he is a drunken priest, beat and rob him, and leave him for dead. Helpless and naked in a ditch, he is ignored by all passers-by, including a fellow crypto-Catholic, but Abraham, an Orthodox crypto-Jew, rescues him and nurses him back to health. He is ultimately able to return to his quest with the help of several crypto-Catholics. The analogous episodes from the Old Testament (Balaam and his talking ass) and New Testament (the Good Samaritan) are both explicitly acknowledged in the narrative as are the nods to Doubting Thomas in Thomas's name and Saint Thomas Aquinas in Aquin's name.

Ultimately, Thomas does locate Aquin's tomb, only to find that he had been a robot, and that therefore the legend of his corporeal incorruptibility was true...but not in a miraculous sense. The robass, which has evidently been programmed by the Church for ruthless practicality, continues to try to persuade Thomas that a false report on Aquin will fulfill all the Church's requirements, but the story ends without resolution with Thomas still unwilling to compromise his faith with a white lie.

== Interpretation ==
Stanislaw Lem commented on the story's religious quagmire as follows: The priest is enraged: you cannot assist the victory of truth with lies! The holy robot, during his missionary work, did pretend to be a human, and even "died" because he decided not to visit a mechanic, so as not to reveal his robotic nature. Thus, the robot served the cause of bringing Truth to the people by the use of a lie.

A conversation between Thomas and the robass about a space station robot that created a new religion and made itself into a prophet of a robotic creator is a likely reference to Isaac Asimov's 1941 short story "Reason".

== See also ==
- The Last Question, by Isaac Asimov, about an artificial super-intelligence which ultimately becomes the Godlike recreator of the Universe after its heat death.
