= Babel II (short story) =

- Short story by Damon Knight
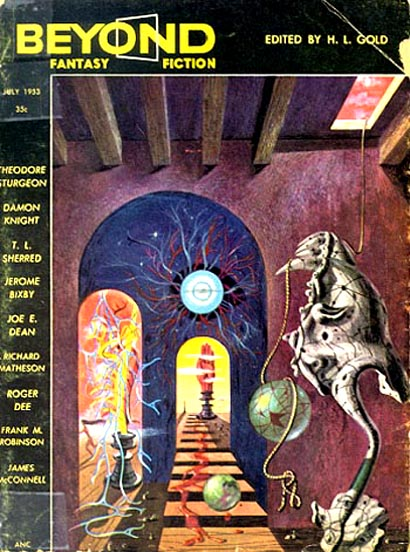
- The inaugural issue of Beyond
- Language: English
- Genre: Science fiction short story

Publication
- Published in: Beyond Fantasy Fiction
- Publication date: July 1953

"Babel II" is a comedic science fiction short story by Damon Knight. The protagonist accidentally causes a second Tower of Babel through his interactions with a trans-dimensional traveller. First published in Beyond Fantasy Fiction in 1953, the story has been a topic of commentary ever since.

== Plot ==
Comic book artist Lloyd Cavanaugh is surprised by a man that suddenly appears in his apartment in Manhattan. The man looks odd, like a character from the Happy Hooligan comic strip. Speaking another language, to communicate the man uses a small disk that produces videos from thought. He eventually explains that he is from another dimension that periodically intersects with Earth. He is using the current conjunction to buy handmade goods. He pays Cavanaugh with enormous diamonds for various photographs in the apartment, but will only buy items Cavanaugh has personally produced. Before leaving, Cavanaugh offers a drink of wine, and the Hooligan reciprocates with a small device that causes a nice feeling when Cavanaugh uses it.

After the Hooligan leaves the apartment, Cavanaugh goes to have the diamonds appraised. He finds the city in chaos. His attempts to ask people what is going on results in gibberish answers. He attempts to buy a newspaper but finds the bills in his wallet are $4 and have incomprehensible words on them, as does the newspaper. Realizing this is a repeat of the Tower of Babel event, he goes over his meeting with traveller and finds it likely his next stop is in Mexico. He manages to get to LaGuardia Airport, but none of the pilots will attempt to fly as radio communications is not possible. He turns back, dejected, witnessing the end of civilization in the making.

Cavanaugh has a sudden thought: the Hooligan had left his apartment on a bus - if he was able to cross dimensions at any point he would have used that method to travel. He races home and catches the Hooligan entering his building. He explains what has happened, to the Hooligan's horror when he realizes his mistake. He asks if he can reverse it, and the Hooligan begins to reassemble the device in a different configuration. Cavanaugh has another thought: he has the Hooligan fix the problem only for the written word. The Hooligan returns to his dimension, leaving Cavanaugh in a world free of yelling.

== Publication ==
The story first appeared in the inaugural issue of Beyond Fantasy Fiction, the July edition although it shipped in May. It has been reprinted in several anthologies, including Knight's own "Far Out" in 1961, and "The Best of Damon Knight" in several printings, as well as a number of others. Robert Silverberg included it in Infinite Jests, a collection of science fiction humor. The language Knight creates for the story, a substitution cypher, is partially described within it, and this is the first entry for "B" in the Encyclopedia of Fictional and Fantastic Languages. This is one of the short stories that ensured Knight's popularity.
