= Great Science-Fiction =

1965 anthology edited by Tony Licata

- Cover of first edition (paperback)
- Author: Edited by Tony Licata
- Cover artist: M. Seltzer
- Language: English
- Genre: Science fiction anthology
- Publisher: Three Star Books
- Publication date: 1965
- Publication place: United States
- Media type: Print (Softcover)
- Pages: 128 pp

Great Science-Fiction was a science fiction short story anthology edited by Tony Licata, published in 1965.

The title was originally conceived of as "The Bizarre." It was changed by the publisher to the more generic and 'safer' Great Science Fiction. There was concern about possible censorship at the time. Bizarre was an adjective often used in sex ads and the publisher also published The National Insider which ran personal ads. Clearly the word bizarre was not one that could be used in a personal ad.

The stories by some of the top writers that I had encountered at the time (early '60s) lived up to my original title.

== Contents ==
- The Wind by Ray Bradbury
- Mouse by Fredric Brown
- The Golem by Avram Davidson
- Judgment Day by L. Sprague de Camp
- History Lesson by Arthur C. Clarke
- The Ruum by Arthur Porges
- Dark Mission by Lester del Rey
- A Better Rat Trap by Brad Steiger
