= Off Center (short story collection) =

1965 collection of short stories by Damon Knight

- Ace Double cover of Off Center
- Author: Damon Knight
- Language: English
- Genre: Science fiction Short stories
- Publisher: Ace Books
- Publication date: 1965
- Publication place: United States
- Media type: Print (Paperback)
- Pages: 141 pp

Off Center is a collection of five science fiction short stories by Damon Knight. They stories were originally published between 1952 and 1964 in Galaxy, If and other science fiction magazines.

The first printing, by Ace, was bound dos-à-dos with Knight's The Rithian Terror as Ace Double M-113. In 1969, the book was re-issued in the UK by Gollancz with the title Off Centre; the novella was omitted and three additional stories were included: "Dulcie and Decorum", "Masks" and "To Be Continued".

== Contents ==
- "What Rough Beast"
- "The Second-Class Citizen"
- "Be My Guest"
- "God's Nose"
- "Catch That Martian"
