= Dulcie and Decorum =

- Short story by Damon Knight
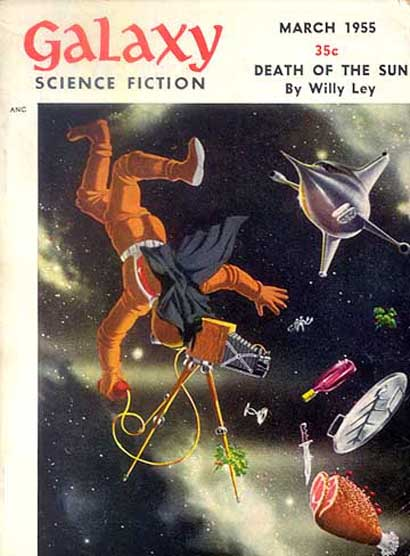
- Country: United States
- Language: English
- Genre: Science fiction

Publication
- Published in: Galaxy Science Fiction
- Publication type: Periodical
- Publisher: Galaxy Publishing Corporation
- Media type: Print (Magazine, Hardback)
- Publication date: March 1955

"Dulcie and Decorum" is a science fiction short story by American writer Damon Knight. It first appeared in the March 1955 issue of Galaxy Science Fiction. In 1969 it was reprinted by Gollancz in the collection Off Centre.

The title is a play on the first words of Dulce et decorum est pro patria mori, the Latin phrase meaning "It is sweet and fitting to die for one's country."

== Synopsis ==
Fred Jones is a writer. One day his British friend Walter Wallace comments on the strange pattern of Jones's typographical errors. Jones becomes obsessed with the topic, and finally discovers that his non-random errors produce almost meaningful sentences, like "JONS RISIV MESSG DLC". By this time Wallace has gone to Arizona; he sends a letter to Jones admitting that he has made a similar discovery about his own typing. Wallace's "messages" end in DCRM and Jones's in DLC; after failing to discover any meaning in the letters, Jones starts to think of them as abbreviations for names, "Dulcie" and "Decorum". Both men become increasingly distracted and disconnected from the world. Back home, Jones starts to speak in foreign languages, sometimes Russian, and he constructs an object in his garage that resembles a miniature building or maze. His wife tries unsuccessfully to break through the mental barrier with help of a friend.

Jones comes to understand what has happened to him: sometime in the future, computers, originally designed to help humans with warfare, are given the power of command. They become all-powerful and all-controlling and lose sight of their original purpose. One of the two computers, "Dulcie", which Jones thinks of as a female, finds a way to simplify "her" work:

Probing into the mysteries of the human brain—so convenient and puzzling a model of her own—she found the pattern that could fix a mind forever in one unreasoning conviction. She chose the simplest and best for her purpose: I love Dulcie. She insinuated that pattern into the mind of every man, woman and child within her reach.

The two computers decide to simplify their war games by simulating the battles, with each killing the humans under their control that “die” in a simulation. When all the humans are gone, Dulcie, and her counterpart on the "Other Side" Decorum, begin to reach back in time for more humans to control, so that their simulations may have more humans as playing pieces, to kill when each loses a battle. As Jones realizes this, the computers ask him to die as a piece in their simulation. He does so happily.
