= Special Delivery (short story) =

- Short story by Damon Knight
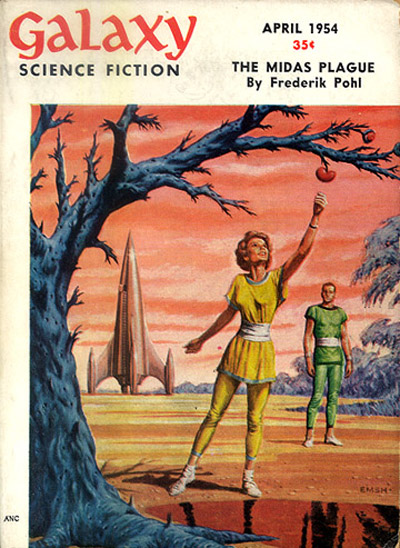
- Country: United States
- Language: English
- Genre: Science fiction

Publication
- Published in: Galaxy Science Fiction
- Publication type: Periodical
- Publisher: Galaxy Publishing Corporation
- Media type: Print (Magazine, Hardback & Paperback)
- Publication date: April 1954

"Special Delivery" is a science fiction short story by American writer Damon Knight. It first appeared in the April 1954 issue of Galaxy Science Fiction and has been reprinted a number of times, in Operation Future (1955), Far Out (1961), and The Best of Damon Knight (1976).

== Synopsis ==
Len and Moira Connington are expecting a baby; Len teaches high-school chemistry and hopes for a promotion. Moira begins to act strangely; it seems as if someone else, a child, is sometimes speaking through her mouth, and she develops aversions to alcohol and coffee. Eventually they realize that the unborn baby, Leo (who named himself for Leonardo da Vinci), is communicating with and through the mother. Leo's intellect develops quickly; soon he is demanding that Moira read German so that he can learn it. At a soiree with the school superintendent, Leo objects to Moira drinking tea, and causes her to spill it on the superintendent's wife's lap. Len's teaching contract is not renewed.

By his eighth month, Leo is requiring Moira to work her way through texts on biology, astrophysics, modern literature, etc. He decides he wants to write a novel; he dictates the first chapter - an historical novel, which Moira titles "The Virgin of Persepolis" - and Moira sends it to a publisher under a pen name. After two weeks the publisher sends a book contract and an advance for nine hundred dollars. Leo continues dictating, until several chapters are completed. Then he loses interest. Len asks the reason. Moira says

"He's got two. One is that he doesn't want to finish the book till he's certain he'll have complete control of the money it earns."

"Well," said Len, swallowing a lump of anger, "that makes a certain amount of sense. It's his book. If he wants guarantees..."

"You haven't heard the other one."

"All right, let's have it."

"He wants to teach us, so we'll never forget, who the boss is in this family."

Moira attempts to complete the novel on her own. She goes into labor. Leo realizes what is happening and objects, but in vain. He is born as a normal baby.

== Background ==
About this story, Knight wrote

My sympathy in this story is divided, but goes mainly to the child - I'm sorry that the plot required him to be choked off.
