= MetaHorror =

1992 short story anthology

- First edition
- Editor: Dennis Etchison
- Language: English
- Genre: Fantasy, horror short stories
- Publisher: Dell Abyss
- Publication date: July 1992
- Publication place: United States
- Media type: Print (paperback)
- Pages: xvii, 377 pp
- ISBN: 0-440-20899-8
- OCLC: 26102190

MetaHorror is an anthology of original fantasy and horror short stories edited by Dennis Etchison. It was published by Dell Abyss in July 1992. The anthology contains, among several other stories, Peter Straub's "The Ghost Village", which won the 1993 World Fantasy Award for Best Short Story. The anthology itself won the 1993 World Fantasy Award for Best Anthology.

== Contents ==
- Introduction (MetaHorror) by Dennis Etchison
- "Blues and the Abstract Truth" by Barry N. Malzberg and Jack Dann
- "Are You Now?" by Scott Edelman
- "Stab" by Lawrence Watt-Evans
- "Mutilator" by Richard Christian Matheson
- "Martyrdom" by Joyce Carol Oates
- "Briar Rose" by Kim Antieau
- "Replacements" by Lisa Tuttle
- "Ziggles" by Donald R. Burleson
- "End of the Line" by Ramsey Campbell
- "Did They Get You to Trade?" by Karl Edward Wagner
- "GIFCO" by M. John Harrison
- "The Properties of the Beast" by Whitley Strieber
- "In Praise of Folly" by Thomas Tessier
- "The Visit" by William F. Nolan
- "The Ring of Truth" by George Clayton Johnson
- "Nothing Will Hurt You" by David Morrell
- "Underground" by Steve Rasnic Tem
- "Bucky Goes to Church" by Robert Devereaux
- "Dumbarton Oaks" by Barry N. Malzberg
- "Novena" by Chelsea Quinn Yarbro
- "The Ghost Village" by Peter Straub

== Reprints ==
- Donald M. Grant, January 1993.
