= Address: Centauri =

1955 novel by F. L. Wallace

- Dust-jacket from the first edition
- Author: F. L. Wallace
- Cover artist: Ed Emshwiller
- Language: English
- Genre: Science fiction
- Publisher: Gnome Press
- Publication date: 1955
- Publication place: United States
- Media type: Print (Hardcover)
- Pages: 220
- OCLC: 1850623

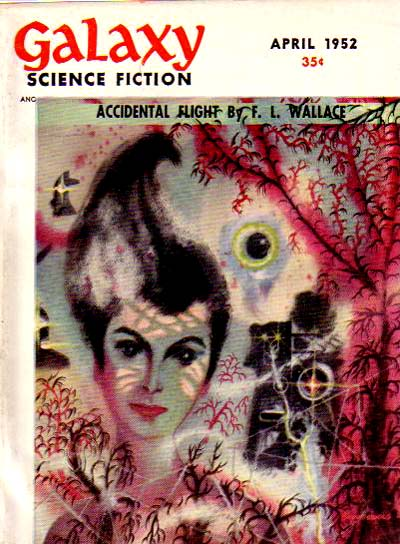
"Accidental Flight" was the cover story for the April 1952 issue of Galaxy Science Fiction.

Address: Centauri is a science fiction novel by American writer F. L. Wallace. It was published in 1955 by Gnome Press in an edition of 4,000 copies. The novel is an expansion of Wallace's story "Accidental Flight", which first appeared in the magazine Galaxy Science Fiction in 1952.

== Characters ==
- Docchi - Formerly an electrochemical engineer, an accident mangles him and tosses him into a tank of cold lighting fluid. He survived but the accident left him armless. The fluid also permeated his system, causing him to glow.
- Nona - Essentially a living computer. Cannot comprehend spoken language.
- Jordan - Half man, his lower torso was severed in an accident.
- Anti (Antoinette) - Ballet dancer who crashed on Venus. Her body was permeated by a Venusian fungus that causes a symbiotic overgrowth of tissue.
- Doctor Cameron - Medical doctor and administrator for Handicap Haven.
- Maureen - Her body lacks the glands to produce male hormones.
- Jeriann - Unable to drink. Gets fluid through absorption capsules.

== Plot summary ==
The novel concerns people with incurable injuries and defects (biocompensators) who volunteer for the first interstellar flight.

Turned down by the medical authorities, the protagonists are refused after they steal a ship to plead their case directly to the people of Earth. Returning to their asteroid hospital, they rig a working gravity drive and escape from the Solar System. They head towards the Centauri system, solving problems such as overcoming a limited supply of needed pharmaceuticals and improving the drive. Earth sends out a ship, the Star Victory with a better version of the new drive in a bid to beat them there, on the theory that any aliens they encounter might make the mistake of thinking of them as normal humans. The Star Victory does beat them by a few days, arriving a year after they left, but they settle on a Mars-like planet near Alpha Centauri, before the Star Victory makes contact with butterfly-like aliens on a methane gas giant in the Proxima Centauri system. The aliens are somewhat similar in technology, but lacking a reliable gravity drive. They want a reasonable sampling of humans to study, but the crew of the Star Victory are all specialists and they are not welcome. The Star Victory leaves the system to the Accidentals, promising to return, someday.

== Reception ==
Anthony Boucher dismissed the novel as "pretty lifeless fiction, in which both prose and characterization emerge directly from the machine, untouched by human hands."

== Sources ==
- Chalker, Jack L.; Mark Owings (1998). The Science-Fantasy Publishers: A Bibliographic History, 1923-1998. Westminster, MD and Baltimore: Mirage Press, Ltd. p. 304.
- Tuck, Donald H. (1978). The Encyclopedia of Science Fiction and Fantasy. Chicago: Advent. p. 443. ISBN 0-911682-22-8.
