= Idiot Stick =

- Short story by Damon Knight
- Country: United States
- Language: English
- Genre: Science fiction

Publication
- Published in: Star Science Fiction
- Publication type: Periodical
- Publisher: Ballantine
- Media type: Print (Magazine, Hardback & Paperback)
- Publication date: 1958

"Idiot Stick" is a science fiction short story by American writer Damon Knight. It first appeared in a 1958 issue of Star Science Fiction and has been reprinted a number of times, including in Star Science Fiction Stories No. 4 (1958) and Far Out (1961).

== Synopsis ==
Aliens land in New Jersey, in a mile-long space ship. They request 500 acres (2.0 km^{2}) of level ground to erect buildings, and induce humans to work for them by passing out capsules that produce a feeling of temporary bliss. The workers are given sticks, each a "light metal or plastic rod, five feet long, with a curved handle and a splayed tip":

"When the command 'Go' is heard," said the alien's voice clearly, "you will all proceed directly forward at a slow walking pace, swinging your sticks from side to side."

The sticks flatten the ground in front of the people as they walk. Later the aliens make adjustments in the sticks, and the ground bulges up into walls. Eventually an enormous building takes shape.

The aliens are circumspect about their motives. One alien, Pendrath, is fond of fraternizing with humans. On one occasion he becomes drunk (from aspirin), and lets slip that the building will house a giant drill, which will be used to place a bomb in the core of the Earth. The purpose is to increase the amount of dust in the space around the Sun as a means to slow down spaceships and to protect the aliens from invasion.

The humans become desperate to find a defense. They modify the "idiot sticks" at random; each modification causes the stick to become unstable and to kill its operator. Eventually a pattern is found that is stable and that is lethal to the aliens. A mob storms the ship and the aliens are killed.
