= The Xi Effect =

1950 science fiction short story by Robert S. Richardson (as Philip Latham)

"The Xi Effect" was originally published in the January 1950 issue of Astounding Science Fiction.

"The Xi Effect" is a science fiction short story by American astronomer and author Robert S. Richardson (as (Philip Latham). It was published first in January 1950 in Astounding Science Fiction.

It has often been anthologised, appearing among the others in The Golden Age of Science Fiction, edited by Kingsley Amis (1981).

== Plot summary ==
Two astrophysicists, Stoddard and Arnold, are having trouble with solar infra-red observations; they find that some wavelengths have simply disappeared. Many radio transmissions have also vanished from the airwaves.

After listening to a talk by a brilliant but eccentric cosmologist, Dr Karl Gustav Friedmann, they realise that his theory about the so-called Xi Effect may explain their observations. The Effect postulates a vastly higher order of space-time called Xi-space, which has altered, causing slowly increasing effects on the local universe. These effects will cause galaxies to collapse and shrink rather than recede as they normally do.

Eventually, the theory is proven as it becomes fact, and the shrinkage become measurable. Electromagnetic radiation is progressively eliminated and even colours begin to disappear. Darkness falls upon the Earth and there is total panic.

== Sources ==
- Kingsley Amis (ed.). The Golden Age of Science Fiction.
