= Not with a Bang (short story) =

- Short story by Damon Knight
- Country: United States
- Language: English
- Genre: Science fiction

Publication
- Published in: The Magazine of Fantasy and Science Fiction
- Publication type: Periodical
- Publisher: Mercury Press
- Media type: Print (Magazine, Hardback & Paperback)
- Publication date: Winter 1949

"Not with a Bang" is a science fiction short story by American writer Damon Knight. It first appeared in the winter 1949 issue of The Magazine of Fantasy and Science Fiction and has been reprinted a number of times, including in Far Out (1961), The Best of Damon Knight (1976), 50 Short Science Fiction Tales, and The Eureka Years (1982).

== Synopsis ==
The story is an ironic, Adam-and-Eve tale. Humanity has been wiped out by a nuclear war, except for one man and woman, who meet in a restaurant in Salt Lake City. The man has a disease that causes recurrent episodes of total paralysis. While in the bathroom, he has an attack, and dies with the realization that the woman is too prudish to enter and save him.

== Background ==
Knight has written that this was the first of his stories that he considered to be of professional quality. He said that the idea for the story

came to me during the time it took for a men's-room door to close behind me in a Swedish restaurant in New York. I didn't have the characters or the setting, but I had the whole structure; all I needed was to find parts that fit.
