= California Gothic =

1995 novel by Dennis Etchison

California Gothic is a novel by Dennis Etchison published by Robinson Publishing in 1995.

== Plot summary ==
California Gothic is a novel about an apparently ordinary man named Dan, and a young woman named Jude who has seemingly returned from the dead to ruin his life.

== Reception ==
Andy Butcher reviewed California Gothic for Arcane magazine, rating it a 7 out of 10 overall. Butcher comments that "California Gothic is one of those horror stories that uses atmosphere very effectively, building up a vague sense of unease rather than just shocking you with gore. In doing so it breaks away from many of the weary traditions of the genre, all of which prevents it from becoming just another horror novel."

== Reviews ==
- Review by Edward Bryant (1995) in Locus, #415 August 1995
- Review by Gahan Wilson (1995) in Realms of Fantasy, October 1995
- Review by W. C. Stroby (1995) in Fangoria, October 1995
- Review by Barb Hendee (1996) in Talebones #4, Summer 1996
- Science Fiction Chronicle 186 1995-10
