= Hell's Pavement =

1955 novel by Damon Knight

- Cover of Hell's Pavement
- Author: Damon Knight
- Cover artist: Richard M. Powers
- Language: English
- Genre: Science fiction
- Publisher: Lion Books
- Publication date: 1955
- Publication place: United States
- Media type: Print (Paperback) (magazine)
- Pages: 192

Hell's Pavement is a science fiction novel by American writer Damon Knight. The story postulates a technique for dealing with asocial behavior by giving everyone an "analogue", a mental imprint of an authority figure that intervenes whenever violent or otherwise harmful acts are contemplated.

Chapter I first appeared in Astounding Science Fiction in January 1952 as "The Analogues". Parts of Chapters II, III, IV and VIII were adapted from Knight's story "Turncoat", which appeared in the April 1953 Thrilling Wonder Stories. The novel was renamed Analogue Men starting with the 1962 Berkley Books version, but regained its original title with a 1971 paperback edition. The original title is based on the aphorism that says that "The road to hell is paved with good intentions".

== Synopsis ==
Early in the novel, one of the characters gives a description of the analogue treatment:

"He's got an analogue," said Martyn. "In the classical sense, he is even less sane than he was before. He has auditory, visual and tactile hallucinations—a complete, integrated set. That's enough to get you entry to most institutions, crowded as they are. But, you see, these hallucinations are pro-societal. They were put there deliberately. He's an acceptable member of society, because he has them...Nobody knows [what the analogue looks like] except himself. A policeman, maybe, or his mother as she looked when he was a child. Someone whom he fears, and whose authority he acknowledges. The subconscious has its own mechanism for creating these false images; all we do is stimulate it—it does the rest."

Most of the story takes place in the 22nd century after analogue treatments have been universally applied for more than 100 years. The United States has broken up into semi-autonomous regions in which the analogue treatment is used to enforce whatever societal norms benefit the ruling classes. The narrative centers on Arthur Bass, who realizes at an early age that he is an "immune", i.e. resistant to the analogue treatment. Bass is identified and recruited by the members of a clandestine group of immunes who are working to overthrow the analogue system.

== Critical response ==
In Voices for the Future: Essays on Major Science Fiction Writers, Thomas D. Clareson wrote: "The chief pleasures of the novel come from Knight's inventiveness. The society he portrays is vividly exhibited."

Groff Conklin praised the novel for providing "a tense experience in a mad and tragic world of tomorrow." Anthony Boucher gave Hell's Pavement a mixed review, praising its "dazzling ingenuity and plausibility," but concluding that it never add[ed] up to a consecutive coherent story." P. Schuyler Miller rated it "no masterpiece, but one of the better pieces of science-fictive entertainment out this year [1955].
