= Be My Guest (short story) =

- Short story by Damon Knight
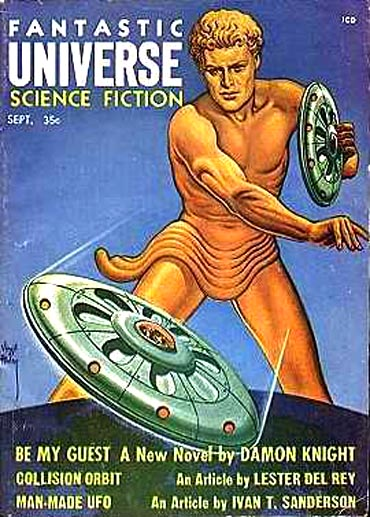
- Country: United States
- Language: English
- Genre: Science fiction

Publication
- Published in: Fantastic Universe
- Publication type: Periodical
- Publisher: King-Size Publications
- Media type: Print (Magazine, Hardback & Paperback)
- Publication date: 1958

"Be My Guest" is a science fiction short story by American writer Damon Knight. It was first published in the September 1958 issue of Fantastic Universe and was re-printed in the collections Off Center and The Others. It has the elements of a ghost story as well as science fiction themes.

== Plot summary ==
Kipling "Kip" Morgan takes his on-off girlfriend Anjelica McTavish back to his apartment after despondently sitting through the funeral of his friend and mentor, the biochemist George Liebert. However they find that the place, which is attached to the pro shop at the golf course where Kip works, has been worked over by George's daughter Nancy. She has always been "difficult", but after Kip consoled her at the funeral she decided they were in love. She has redecorated the apartment and the pro shop storeroom on the theme of love, with whatever materials were handy, including paint.

They evict Nancy, but Anjelica leaves too, with her usual remark that Kip should be doing more with his talents. He started studying law, then switched to science, where he did well until a mysterious psychosomatic affliction stopped him cold. He dropped out and held a series of outdoor jobs, ending up as a golf pro at a local course.

Next morning Kip gets a shock when he drinks his breakfast prune juice. He is violently sick, and realizes that Nancy has spiked the juice with a vitamin that her father isolated from pigs. The compound seems harmless to most animals, although it causes monkeys to go insane and literally bite themselves to death.

Kip is even more shocked when he begins hearing voices from within his body. He discovers that he can see four small ghostly, malevolent-looking humanoid creatures sitting on his shoulders. He is able to talk to them, and discovers that they are the spirits of dead people inhabiting his body. Once they realize that he is aware of them, he is put into "quarantine". Nobody he meets will look at him or acknowledge his existence. The same thing happens to Anjelica and Nancy.

The three of them take over an empty suite at a hotel and steal to supply their needs. Anjelica, who works for a politician, relishes the opportunity to spy on rivals. Nancy is as unbalanced as ever except for her new-found attachment to Kip. Kip, for his part, cannot stand the voices of his spirits. Realizing that they were responsible for driving him away from science and towards an outdoor life, he tries to drive them out by doing things they find repugnant, such as studying science. Fighting the torture they inflict on him, he succeeds. For a while he is free. He begins to believe that all the different phases of his life had something to do with the spirits that inhabited him, starting with a set he must have inherited when his uncle, a lawyer, died suddenly at his home. However his relief is short-lived. His four outdoor-loving spirits are replaced with seven who are a lot nastier.

The three outcasts go on a rampage through their world. Anjelica steals and spies to her heart's content. Kip drives out his new tenants, only to get even worse ones. He becomes a barfly under their influence. He wanders through the seedy parts of town, until he overhears a message passed through one of the local storefront mediums. It tells him that "One drink is half a drink, two drinks is a drink too much, and three drinks is no drink at all." This inspires him to attempt suicide by drinking more of Nancy's sample of the mystery vitamin. Unfortunately, once the vomiting stops he finds he is in worse shape. Not only can he see and hear his own spirits, he can see and hear everyone else's. Nancy has a set consisting of two rabid prudes and two sluts, explaining her erratic behavior.

Finally Kip works out that the system must be run by old spirits who, naturally, would have the best and most desirable hosts, the kind of people who seem to lead charmed lives and enjoy infinite privilege. Breaking into the home of one of these, he finds the occupying spirits, and threatens to dose the host with the vitamin unless he gets a better deal, not just for him but for everyone who is inhabited by spirits that are bad for them.

He eventually gets his way. The spirits have a measure of revenge because after the quarantine is lifted the three of them are arrested. Most of the charges are dropped, although Kip and Anjelica both lose their jobs. Anjelica, who had always seemed ambitious, is even more so without the restraint of the spirits. She packs and leaves for pastures new, much to Kip's dismay. However Nancy, with more compatible tenants, suddenly seems much more interesting to him.

Kip also realizes that the message he overheard from the medium was meant for him, and it came from George Liebert. The final part "Three drinks is no drink at all" gives him an idea. He drinks the vitamin for the third time, and the voices stop.
