= F. L. Wallace =

American novelist

F. L. Wallace c. 1953

Floyd Lee Wallace (February 16, 1915 – November 26, 2004), credited as F L Wallace or sometimes Floyd Wallace, was a noted science fiction and mystery writer. He was born in Rock Island, Illinois, in 1915, and died in Tustin, California, in 2004. Wallace lived most of his life in California, working as a writer and mechanical engineer after attending the University of Iowa. He also attended UCLA.

His first published story, "Hideaway", was published in the magazine Astounding. Galaxy Science Fiction and other science fiction magazines published his subsequent stories, including "Student Body", "Delay in Transit", "Bolden's Pets", and "Tangle Hold". His mystery works include "Driving Lesson", a second-prize winner of the twelfth annual short-story contest given by Ellery Queen's Mystery Magazine. His novel Address: Centauri was published by Gnome Press in 1955. His works have been translated into numerous languages, and his stories are available today around the world in anthologies.

Incomplete list of novels
| genre | credits | title | publisher | year |
|---|---|---|---|---|
| SF | | Address: Centauri | Gnome Press | 1955 |
| MY | F. L. Wallace | Three Times A Victim | Ace Books | 1957 |
| MY | Floyd Wallace | Wired For Scandal | Ace Books | 1959 |
