= The Man in the Tree =

1984 novel by Damon Knight

The Man in the Tree is a novel by Damon Knight published in 1984.

== Plot summary ==
The Man in the Tree is a novel in which a giant has the ability to twist probability worlds, allowing him to duplicate anything by taking a copy of something from another world.

== Reception ==
Dave Langford reviewed The Man in the Tree for White Dwarf #67, and stated that "Nicely written, but it provokes nagging questions. Why giantism and psychic power when either alone could carry the novel? Why such uninspired use of the hero's special talent (which tends to boil down to routine healings and conjuring)? Why, with an intelligent enemy hot on his trail, does he go on public view as a giant in a carnival? These are deep waters, Watson."

== Reviews ==
- Review by Debbie Notkin (1983) in Locus, #275 December 1983
- Review by Jackson Houser (1984) in Fantasy Review, #64 January 1984
- Review by Algis Budrys (1984) in The Magazine of Fantasy & Science Fiction, May 1984
- Review by Tom Easton (1984) in Analog Science Fiction/Science Fact, May 1984
- Review by PhullisJ. Day (1984) in Fantasy Review, July 1984
- Review by Gregory Feeley (1984) in Foundation, #31 July 1984
- Review by Robert Coulson (1984) in Amazing Stories, September 1984
- Review by C. J. Henderson (1984) in Whispers #21-22, December 1984
- Review by Chris Bailey (1985) in Vector 127
- Review by Lech Jęczmyk (1985) in Fantastyka, #31 April 1985
