= Student Body (short story) =

Short story by F.L.Wallace

"Student Body" is a science fiction short story by F. L. Wallace. It was first published in Galaxy Magazine in 1953 and has been anthologised many times. It was included in the anthology The Golden Age of Science Fiction.

== Plot ==
Humanity is spreading rapidly through the galaxy, and a planet known as Glade has been identified as suitable for colonization as it has a near-Earth climate (and presumably near-Earth gravity and atmosphere). A colonisation expedition lands on Glade; one rocket contains the potential colonists and their equipment, whilst a second rocket returns to Earth to confirm the suitability of the planet and bring more settlers.

Under the energetic leadership of Executive Hafner, the colonists start to assemble agricultural equipment and prepare for planting fast-growing crops that they will need to survive. But biologist Dano Marin is already concerned that all is not as it should be. Biological controls have previously surveyed the planet, without actually landing, and cleared it as being benign, but very soon mice appear and attack the crops and food stocks. Attempts are made to control them, but they then appear in plague proportions.

Marin thinks he knows what has happened. The apparently harmless native lifeform, which he dubs the omnimal', has the ability to adapt to threats as they appear. They can mutate and reproduce with amazing speed. As the mice are brought under control by robot cats, they are replaced with rats who attack one of the cats en masse and manage to destroy it. The humans bring in terriers to fight the rats, but this only stops them temporarily. They are then further replaced by tiger-like creatures.

Marin now knows what the next mutation will be and is proved right when food again goes missing from the fields. With Hafner only partially convinced, he seeks out the new creature. Hafner wants to shoot it, but Marin convinces him not to, knowing that a further mutated creature will be unstoppable. They come face-to-face with the creature and the story ends with the line: "It looked very much like a man."

== In other media ==
"Student Body" was adapted as the sixty-third episode of the radio anthology series X Minus One, first broadcast July 31, 1956.
