= The Best of Damon Knight =

1976 collection of science fiction short stories by Damon Knight

- Cover of first edition
- Author: Damon Knight
- Cover artist: Richard V. Corben
- Language: English
- Series: The Best of ... series
- Genre: Science fiction
- Publisher: Nelson Doubleday/SFBC
- Publication date: 1976
- Publication place: United States
- Media type: Print (hardcover)
- Pages: ix, 307
- OCLC: 2215117
- Preceded by: The Best of Poul Anderson
- Followed by: The Best of Walter M. Miller, Jr.

The Best of Damon Knight is a collection of science fiction short stories by American author Damon Knight, edited by Adele Leone Hull. It was first published in hardcover in May 1976 in a Science Fiction Bookclub edition, ahead of the main paperback edition by Pocket Books in September 1976 as the eighth volume in its Best of ... series. The book was reprinted by Pocket Books in July 1980. A new edition was issued in trade paperback and ebook by ReAnimus Press in December 2020.

== Summary ==
The book contains twenty-two short works of fiction, together with an introduction by fellow science fiction writer Barry N. Malzberg and a second, general introduction and introductory notes on the individual stories by the author.

== Contents ==
- "Dark of the Knight" [introduction] (Barry N. Malzberg)
- "Introduction"
- "Not with a Bang" (1950)
- "To Serve Man" (1950)
- "Cabin Boy" (1951)
- "The Analogues" (1952)
- "Babel II" (1953)
- "Special Delivery" (1954)
- "Thing of Beauty" (1958)
- "Anachron" (1954)
- "Extempore" (1956)
- "Backward, O Time" (1956)
- "The Last Word" (1957)
- "Man in the Jar" (1957)
- "The Enemy" (1958)
- "Eripmav" (1958)
- "A Likely Story" (1956)
- "Time Enough" (1960)
- "Mary" (1964)
- "The Handler" (1960)
- "The Big Pat Boom" (1963)
- "Semper Fi" (1964)
- "Masks" (1968)
- "Down There" (1973)

== Awards ==
The book placed sixth in the 1977 Locus Poll Award for Best Single Author Collection.

== Reception ==
The book was reviewed by Steve Fahnestalk in New Venture #4, Summer 1976, Michael Bishop in Delap's F & SF Review, January 1977, and Bob Mecoy in Future Life, December 1980.
