= A for Anything =

1959 novel by Damon Knight

- Cover of The People Maker (1959), which was revised and republished as A for Anything (1961)
- Author: Damon Knight
- Language: English
- Genre: Science fiction
- Published: 1959 (Berkley)
- Publication place: United States
- Media type: Print (Paperback) (magazine)
- Pages: 160

A for Anything is a science fiction novel by American writer Damon Knight. The author postulates the discovery, in the near future, of the "Gismo", a device that can duplicate anything—even another Gismo. Since all material objects have become essentially free, the only commodity of value is human labor, and the author suggests that a slave economy would be the inevitable result.

The novel first appeared in 1959 as The People Maker (Zenith Books), based on a story in the November 1957 issue of Fantasy and Science Fiction. Knight subsequently revised the text, which was published by Berkley in 1961 as A for Anything. It is generally considered to be Knight's finest novel.

Knight has said of this novel: "I chose the matter duplicator, because I thought other authors had handled it badly."

== Synopsis ==
An anonymous inventor sends copies of the "Gismo" through the mail to hundreds of people. Civil society immediately collapses; as one news commentator says: "The big question today is: Have you got a Gismo? And believe me, nothing else matters." The story jumps to the year 2149: the society we know has been replaced by a society of wealthy minority supported by slavery, and access to Gismos is jealously guarded by Gismo-produced slave guards. The story is told through the eyes of Dick Jones, the son of the leader of Buckhill, a compound in the Poconos. Jones is coming of age and is about to be sent to Eagles, another, larger compound in the Rocky Mountains, for military training. Jones is initially presented as an unsympathetic character: spoiled, impulsive, hot-headed. In his final day at Buckhill, he insults a cousin who then challenges Dick to a duel; Dick kills him, and has to be ushered away in secret the following morning for fear of retribution.

Eagles is a city superb built inside a tall mountain. Jones arrived at eagles. Eagles is run as a slave society. As your are aware of Buckhill, it's the same kind. The different thing is the GISMO duplicates the slaves here. He verified the slaves their trust, their ability, if they are best slaves than he multiplies them hundred of times. Status in the society is based on their skills in hand to hand compbat and other skills like weapons etc. Like Buckhill, Eagles is run as a slave society; GISMO takes pleasure in having fight games, also killing his slaves by throwing them from the tall tower of mounted and enjoyed their death watching through CCTV. They recycles the slaves after 30 years of age. Every free man on Eagles has 300 slaves. Some slaves live longer who are more trusted, valuable and the killing of all 300 is not regular.

There are hints from Jones's father in Buckhill that the slaves are contemplating revolt. In Eagles, Jones is introduced to a secret society that debates the merits of the slave culture and that plans a revolution, with the collaboration of a disaffected member of the ruling family. Jones is enthralled by the arguments he hears. At these meetings, the reader discovers that once the Gismo was sent out and the initial battles were fought, almost no scientific advances were made because the Gismo could do everything. It is hinted that some saw the time of chaos as a chance to advance space exploration but some people from the meetings say that it was all theory and nothing was ever built. But before the revolution can be put into action, the slaves revolt, killing most of the free citizens in Eagles and Buckhill, including Jones's family. Jones is forced to choose between his allegiance to kin and his yearning for a better society. In the end, Jones chooses to turn against the slaves so that he can become "The Man" at Buckhill replacing his murdered Father and getting society back to where it was when he left for Eagles.
