= Mind Switch =

1965 novel by Damon Knight

- Cover of Mind Switch
- Author: Damon Knight
- Cover artist: Hoot von Zitzewitz
- Language: English
- Genre: Science fiction
- Publisher: Berkley
- Publication date: 1965
- Publication place: United States
- Media type: Print (Paperback) (magazine)
- Pages: 144

Mind Switch is a science fiction novel by American writer Damon Knight. It follows two individuals, a reporter for Paris-Soir and an intelligent alien at the Berlin Zoo, after their minds have been switched by a time-travel experiment gone awry.

A shorter version of the novel was published in Galaxy magazine in April 1963 as "A Visitor to the Zoo". In 1966 it was published under the title The Other Foot.

Knight has called this novel his favorite among his books.

== Synopsis ==
In the year 2002, the Berlin Zoo acquires a new specimen: "Fritz", a biped from "Brecht's planet". Fritz is intelligent, and his keepers treat him with a mix of courtesy and disdain; he is kept in a display with another (presumably female) biped and the two are required to work for a living, transcribing tapes made by explorers to their planet. One day, Martin Naumchik, a human male, is visiting the zoo when his personality and that of the biped are interchanged. The switch is the unintended consequence of an experiment in time travel that takes place at another location. The remainder of the story follows the two characters as they come to terms with their new bodies and new feelings. Martin quickly becomes aware of the degradation of being a zoo animal, while Fritz is forced to cope with life in a confusing and threatening alien society. Martin tries, and fails, to convince his captors that he is imprisoned in the biped's body; the biped, in Martin's body, eventually comes into contact with Martin's colleagues and his lover, and manages to continue with Martin's life.

The novel also deals wryly with the theme of sexual identity. Because Fritz is provided with inguinal glands resembling a human male's, he is presumed to be male. But it turns out that the organ has nothing to do with reproduction: Fritz is a female, and the smaller primate with whom he shares a cage is a male. To reproduce, the female aggressively bites off an egglike knob from the male's forehead containing the semen. Martin (in Fritz's body), and the reader, only learn this at the end of the novel, when he is overcome by passion and commits the act.

== Reception ==
Judith Merril found the opening to the novel promising, but concluded that "having demonstrated intriguingly the effects of their new bodies on two intelligent and well-meaning creatures -- [Knight] just sort of stops, about where the story seemed about to start. P. Schuyler Miller panned the novel, describing the story as "predictable" and characterizing Knight's writing as "atypical and exasperating".

Academic Douglas Robillard praised the manner in which Knight illustrated many of his themes, declaring that "Knight shows a prodigality of invention in his tale, capable of sustaining a much longer novel, or even another book". Sian MacArthur noted that Mind Switch "engages Gothic sentiment in a much more subtle fashion" than other Knight novels, engaging "the theme of existentialism" in exploring the title exchange.

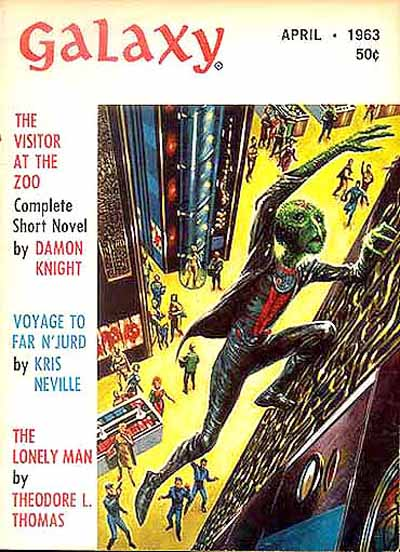
"A Visitor to the Zoo" was originally published in the April 1963 issue of Galaxy Science Fiction
