= The Rithian Terror =

1965 novel by Damon Knight

- Cover of The Rithian Terror
- Author: Damon Knight
- Language: English
- Genre: Science fiction
- Publisher: Ace
- Publication date: 1965
- Publication place: United States
- Media type: Print (Paperback) (magazine)
- Pages: 111

The Rithian Terror (also known as Double Meaning) is a science fiction novel by American writer Damon Knight. The story is a psychological thriller that follows an Earth security officer in the future who is racing against time to locate an alien spy. First published in 1953, this is one of the first books to feature a surveillance drone.

== Synopsis ==
The story takes place in the year 2521. The Earth is the dominant power in a Galactic empire, with a policy of ruthlessly conquering or undermining other alien races which it encounters. The latest are the Rithians, and after some years of clandestine harassment by Earth, the Rithians have managed to place a group of spies disguised as humans on the Earth. By the time the infiltration is discovered, only one of the Rithians remains. Thorne Spangler, a security officer, is given the task of locating the remaining Rithian. He enlists the help of a native of an "uncivilized" human planet on the fringes of the empire, which has good dealings with Rithians. A primary source of tension is the conflict between these two: the Earthman who rigidly follows protocols, and the outsider who is loyal to Earth but contemptuous of what he sees as an ossified and decadent civilization.

== Publication history ==
The novel first appeared in the January 1953 issue of Startling Stories under the title Double Meaning. In 1965 it was published as The Rithian Terror in Ace Double M113 as a dos-a-dos binding with Off Center, a collection of Knight's short stories. Following the Ace Double edition, the novella was re-published under the title "Double Meaning" in a Tor Double, together with Knight's Rule Golden.
