= The Country of the Kind =

- Short story by Damon Knight
- Country: United States
- Language: English
- Genre: Science fiction

Publication
- Published in: The Magazine of Fantasy & Science Fiction
- Publication type: Magazine
- Media type: Print
- Publication date: February 1956

"The Country of the Kind" is a science fiction short story by American writer Damon Knight. It was first published in the February 1956 issue of The Magazine of Fantasy and Science Fiction and has been reprinted several times, including in In Deep (1963), The Science Fiction Hall of Fame (vol. 1) (1976), and The Golden Age of Science Fiction (1981).

== Plot ==
The story is set in a future world in which violence and crime have been almost entirely eradicated. The main character is a man who is capable of antisocial behavior and who, after not being killed in retaliation for a murder he committed, considers himself “the king of the world.” He is allowed to do what he wishes, take what he wants and go where he pleases without reprisal, so long as he does no violence to another human being. The “humane, permissive” society in which he lives has adopted a threefold solution for someone who is, by their standards, insane. The first is excommunication - no one is to interact with him or even acknowledge his existence, other than by the apparent worldwide directive identifying him and calling for this punishment. Secondly, he is thrown into an epileptic seizure whenever he attempts to commit violence against another human. Thirdly, his body and waste give off a highly offensive odor, undetectable by him, to identify him, warn others of his presence and drive them away.

The main character spends his time following his whims, traveling all over the world and alternating between vandalism, harassment, stealing and leaving carved statues with a specific message, explaining how anyone can, through any simple act of violence, join him.

The story ends with a desperate plea from the protagonist for someone, anyone to share the world with him.

== Reception ==
In 2004, Strange Horizons described the story as "interesting enough", but "pallid". James Nicoll calls it "a fairly representative example of the alienated man", but commends the story for avoiding "Fans Are Slans"-style elitism.

In 2001, John Derbyshire wrote a column for the National Review, in which he analyzed the concept of normality within the context of demographic shift, and cited "Country of the Kind" as an example of the value of abnormality (while misrepresenting the protagonist as having been officially licensed to break into homes and vandalize their contents).

== See also ==
- The Country of the Blind: a 1904 short story by H. G. Wells in which a sighted man trapped in an isolated community which has lost all power of sight finds he does not have the king-like position he expected.
