= The Observers =

1988 novel by Damon Knight

- Cover of The Observers
- Author: Damon Knight
- Language: English
- Genre: Science fiction
- Publisher: Tom Doherty
- Publication date: 1988
- Publication place: United States
- Media type: Print (Hardcover) (magazine)
- Pages: 281
- ISBN: 0-312-93074-7
- Preceded by: CV
- Followed by: A Reasonable World

The Observers is a 1988 science fiction novel by American writer Damon Knight. It is the second novel in the "Sea Venture Trilogy", preceded by CV (1985) and followed by A Reasonable World (1991).

== Plot summary ==
The novel opens shortly after the end of CV, early in the 21st century. The "plague" that struck the Sea Venture (CV) is well known, although few people understand yet its true nature: an alien parasite or symbiont that lives temporarily in people's minds, transferring to another person after a few days. The parasite makes small but significant changes in the host's psyche before departing: as one of the characters describes the change,

...it would be hard to explain to anybody else. What he meant was that he had overlooked the essential dumbness of a lot of things. If there was a pattern in these things, it had something to do with accepting what he was told, or not even that, accepting things he had never been told but had believed just the same. Some of these things were important and some trivial -- most of them where trivial, but there were enough of them that he felt now he was living in another world.

Or as another character remarks: he no longer believes in "BS". Victims of the parasite often quit their jobs, abandon a spouse, or discard religious or political beliefs.

At the end of CV, the single parasite had managed to reproduce via the unborn child of one of the passengers, before it was trapped at the bottom of the ocean. When that child is born nine months later, on land, the parasite is once again able to move from person to person, but it is immature, lacking access to the knowledge of its "mother". It begins to learn about the human world by sampling the minds of people from all walks of life (hence "The Observers"), changing them in the process. It begins to reproduce by infecting pregnant women.

Much of the novel takes place back on the Sea Venture which has now been converted into an internment camp for previously infected people. The scientists in charge of learning about the "disease" are well-intentioned, but Knight shows their darker side as well, as they gradually move from benign observation to more coercive techniques, including torture.

Eventually, a large fraction of the human population has been afflicted. The parasites decide collectively that in order to save the human race from its own bad impulses, they must put a stop to violence. They do this by immediately striking dead anyone who is at the point of killing or injuring another person.

== Reception ==
The Encyclopedia of Science Fiction writes that "the series as a whole seems young at heart, and Knight's cognitive energy remains clearly evident".
