= The Sun Saboteurs =

1961 novel by Damon Knight

- Ace Double cover of The Sun Saboteurs
- Author: Damon Knight
- Language: English
- Genre: Science fiction
- Publisher: Ace Books
- Publication date: 1961
- Publication place: United States
- Media type: Print (Paperback) (magazine)
- Pages: 101

The Sun Saboteurs is a 1961 science fiction novel by American writer Damon Knight. Its topic is expatriate Earthmen living on an alien planet, and their daily hardships in dealing with their status as a minority group among aliens.

The story first appeared in 1955 in the form of a novella, entitled "The Earth Quarter", in If magazine . An expanded version was published by Ace in 1961, bound dos-à-dos with G. McDonald Wallis's The Light of Lilith as Ace Double F-108. It was reissued under its original title in the omnibus World Without Children and The Earth Quarter; and in the UK under the original title in the omnibus Two Novels.

== Synopsis ==
In the future, Earth has been devastated by war and disease and supports only a primitive agrarian society. Most Earthmen live elsewhere, as émigrés on planets that are populated by alien species. The author suggests that the human species is the only one plagued by "original sin", i.e. by an innate tendency to lie, cheat, kill; aliens have come to accept these traits without understanding them. The story takes place among a group of humans in the "Earth Quarter", a ghetto on the planet Palu that is populated by an insect-like alien race called the Niori. The story opens with a visit by a representative of a political group, the "Minority People's League", which endorses the return of humans to their ancestral planet and accommodation with the aliens. The envoy is attacked and murdered by a group of thugs who see all aliens as inferior to humans and who seek retribution for humans' second-class status. Their leader, Rack, commandeers a space ship and convinces a group from the Quarter to follow him as he establishes a new colony on an uninhabited planet. Instead, Rack puts them to work building "total-conversion bombs" and begins a campaign of using the bombs to destroy the suns of alien solar systems (hence the "sun saboteurs" of the title). Eventually Rack is stopped by a fleet of galactic (alien) ships, but he barely escapes and returns to Palu. The humans murder him, but are nevertheless forced by the Niori to leave. At the story's close, the humans are preparing to board a ship for Earth.

== Critical reception ==
Rich Horton writes "The novel is very well written -- from the first it is clear we are in the hands of a real writer... The action is mostly in a minor key, and the entire feel is both sad and bitterly cynical."
