= Beyond the Barrier =

1964 novel by Damon Knight

- Cover of Beyond the Barrier
- Author: Damon Knight
- Original title: The Tree of Time
- Language: English
- Genre: Science fiction
- Publisher: Doubleday
- Publication date: 1964
- Publication place: United States
- Media type: Print (Hardcover) (magazine)
- Pages: 188 pp

Beyond the Barrier (original title The Tree of Time) is a science fiction novel by American writer Damon Knight. The novel tells the story of a physics professor in 1980 who begins to doubt that he is a human being. He imagines that he may have been sent from another world to rescue Earth; or perhaps to destroy it. Solving the mystery takes him far into the future.

== Synopsis ==
Professor Gordon Naismith is an average man in most respects, except that he has exceptional reflexes, and he has no memory of his life prior to four years ago, when he believes he was involved in a plane crash. During one of his classes a student asks a disturbing question: “What is a zug?” The question triggers a series of violent incidents, and Naismith is framed for a murder. He learns that the student is not human, but rather an "Ugly", and that he, in turn, is a "Shefth", a member of the warrior class from Earth's far future. In that future, a Time Barrier was constructed to keep violent aliens called Zugs in the past. The future humans supposedly want a Shefth to go kill a Zug which survived the Time Barrier. The Uglies take Naismith to the future, where Naismith learns that most humans died during a plague. The Uglies catch Naismith; he escapes onto a half-finished time machine, which doesn’t go through time, but oscillates through the core of the Earth before popping out the other side. Naismith is rescued by a girl who takes him to the point in time when the Time Barrier is erected; here he is expected to kill the surviving Zug.

== Significance ==
The novel has been interpreted as Knight's attempt to mimic the style of A. E. van Vogt (or to "out-van Vogt van Vogt", in the words of Rich Horton). This would be ironic, given Knight's famous and devastating critique of Van Vogt's work in In Search of Wonder.

Robert Smithson has argued that Beyond the Barrier is an example of science fiction in which architectural examples are presented that have nothing to do with science or fiction, but instead suggest "a new kind of monumentality which has much in common with the aims of some of today's artists."

This kind of nullification has re-created Kasimir Malevich's "non-objective world," where there are no more "likenesses of reality, no idealistic images, nothing but a desert!" But for many of today's artists this "desert" is a "City of the Future" made of null structures and surfaces. ... In Damon Knight's Sci-fi novel, "Beyond the Barrier," he describes in a phenomenological manner just such surface-structures: "Part of the scene before them seemed to expand. Where one of the flotation machines had been there was a dim lattice of crystals, growing more shadowy and insubstational as it swelled; then darkness; then a dazzle of faint prismatic light — tiny complexes in a vast three-dimensional array, growing steadily bigger." This description has none of the "values" of the naturalistic "literary" novel, it is crystalline, and of the mind of virtue of being outside of unconscious action. This very well could be an inchoate concept for a work by Judd, LeWitt, Flavin, or Insley.

The novel is cited for containing a scene of "circular causality", in which a couple depart to seek a time traveler stranded in the past a moment after seeing themselves return safely with him.

The novel is also notable for containing one of the few serious depictions in literature of a protagonist falling all the way through the Earth.

== Publication history ==
The novel is an expanded version of "The Tree of Time", which was published in The Magazine of Fantasy & Science Fiction in two installments in December 1963 and January 1964. After its first hardcover publication by Doubleday in 1964, it has been reprinted several times in hard- and soft-cover editions, by Gollancz (1964), Macfadden (1965, 1970), and Hamlyn (1978).
