= CV (novel) =

1985 novel by Damon Knight

- Cover of CV
- Author: Damon Knight
- Language: English
- Genre: Science fiction
- Publisher: Tom Doherty
- Publication date: 1985
- Publication place: United States
- Media type: Print (Hardcover) (magazine)
- Pages: 285
- ISBN: 0-312-93513-7
- Followed by: The Observers

CV is a 1985 science fiction novel by American writer Damon Knight. It is the first novel in the "Sea Venture Trilogy", and was followed by The Observers (1988) and A Reasonable World (1991).

The name of the novel derives from "The Sea Venture" ("CV" for short), an enormous, ocean-going habitat. During one of its first trips, the Sea Venture takes on a parasite, an alien symbiont that can pass from one person to another, leaving them changed in subtle but consequential ways. The symbiont enforces something like rational behavior upon its victims, causing them to question their earlier beliefs and practices. At the end of the novel, the parasite is brought to the mainland; the subsequent novels in the trilogy explore the consequences as it begins to affect a large part of the human population.

== Synopsis ==
The Sea Venture (CV) is an enormous, largely self-contained floating vessel that serves as a prototype sea habitat. It was developed in part as an alternative to a more expensive orbital colony; one of the advocates of the space habitats, professor Paul Newland, is aboard to discover whether CV poses a threat to his dreams. Another passenger, an assassin who uses the name of John Stevens, has been tasked with killing Newland. The CV has no propulsion system; it navigates using ocean currents, and it is able to submerge in order to take advantage of the different currents at different levels below the surface. In addition to its crew, the CV carries about two thousand permanent residents as well as passengers.

The novel opens as the Sea Venture is preparing to debark from San Francisco on its way to Guam. Soon after, a routine sample collection from the ocean floor pulls in a purplish, granular lump about the size of a fist; Newland, who is present in the collection room with a crew member named Randall Geller, suggests cracking it open. It contains what looks like a hollow sphere of glass. Just as it is opened, Geller feels faint, then recovers. Soon after, he collapses into a coma-like state. The same series of events occurs again and again; it soon becomes clear that the agent released from the nodule can travel from person to person, leaving them in an unconscious state after it departs. Soon there are dozens of afflicted patients. The sole doctor on board, Dr. Wallace McNulty, improvises an isolation ward, but cases keep occurring, several per day.

On the tenth day, the first patient, Geller, recovers, and soon it becomes clear that the coma is temporary. There are no ill effects, but the recovered patients have been changed in subtle ways: they discard many of their past, irrational beliefs and fears, and in many cases change their way of life. For instance, crew members decide that their jobs are pointless and abandon them; married people leave their spouses. Knight reveals to us a little of the thought processes of the symbiont: it appears to have been in suspended animation for millennia, and it is now trying to learn about humans by temporarily gaining access to their thought processes and their impressions. Knight suggests that the changes made by the parasites in human brains are a benefit; hence the parasite is actually a symbiont.

McNulty and the captain try a number of schemes for isolating the parasite, but without success. In the end, it escapes onto land after having infected the unborn child of one of the passengers.

== Significance ==
This novel, and the others in the Sea Venture trilogy, have been described as "utopian literature". The modifications wrought by the (apparently) moralistic symbionts echo the theme of Knight's earlier stories: "Rule Golden", "Natural State", and "The Dying Man", in which artificially increased empathy makes it impossible for people to be cruel without suffering the victim's pain.

== Publication history ==
The novel was first published, in three parts, in The Magazine of Fantasy and Science Fiction, in January, February and March 1985.
