= In Deep (book) =

- Cover art for In Deep
- Author: Damon Knight
- Language: English
- Genre: Science fiction
- Publisher: Berkeley Medallion Books
- Publication date: 1963
- Publication place: United States
- Media type: Print (Paperback)
- Pages: 158 pp

In Deep is a collection of eight science fiction short stories by American writer Damon Knight. The stories were originally published between 1951 and 1960 in The Magazine of Fantasy and Science Fiction, Rogue and other magazines.

The book contains the short story "The Country of the Kind", considered by many to be Knight's finest and included in The Science Fiction Hall of Fame, Volume One.

The story "The Handler" was omitted from British editions of the book, published by Gollancz in 1964.

== Contents ==
- "Four in One"
- "An Eye for a What?"
- "The Handler"
- "Stranger Station"
- "Ask Me Anything"
- "The Country of the Kind"
- "Ticket to Anywhere"
- "Beachcomber"
