= Masks (short story) =

- Short story by Damon Knight
- Country: United States
- Language: English
- Genre: Science fiction

Publication
- Published in: Playboy
- Publication type: Periodical
- Media type: Print (magazine)
- Publication date: 1968

"Masks" is a science fiction short story by American writer Damon Knight. It was originally published in Playboy magazine in 1968, and reprinted in The Best of Damon Knight (1976). It concerns a man who has been given an artificial body to house his brain and spinal cord.

== Plot ==
Jim is a man who has undergone a procedure known as "Total Prosthesis", or "TP", after his body was almost destroyed in an accident. The expense of the TP project is causing politicians to consider shutting it down. He has begun to behave strangely, insisting on wearing a metal mask at all times. All efforts to provide him with a natural environment have been rejected. He prefers a sterile, artificial environment with no plants, and no access to outside air. He considers efforts to make his prosthetic body more natural-looking to be a waste of time. Visitors, and the people who share the living space with him, wear surgical masks, ostensibly to guard against infections. Jim is hostile most of the time, even to those who live with him to provide him with human company. Much effort is made to offer him social and psychological support, but he professes not to need such things. The married couple who share his space have a pet puppy, which he abhors.

He is visited by other members of the project, and as they talk to him about his condition he notices all the tiny blemishes and minor infections on their skin, and their personal tics and mannerisms. He tells them that he is designing a vehicle into which his brain can be moved, so he can explore the Moon and other planets.

After they leave the puppy enters the room, through a door that had been left open. The man picks up a metal draftsman's square and uses it to kill the puppy. It becomes apparent that he is repelled by organic life and yearns to become a machine himself. Wearing a mask means he does not have to see his own face in the mirror.

== Reception ==
"Masks" was a finalist for the 1969 Hugo Award for Best Short Story and the Nebula Award for Best Short Story of 1968.
