= Far Out (book) =

- Cover art for Far Out
- Author: Damon Knight
- Language: English
- Genre: Science fiction
- Publisher: Simon & Schuster
- Publication date: 1961
- Publication place: United States
- Media type: Print (hardback)
- Pages: 282

Far Out is a collection of 13 science fiction short stories by American writer Damon Knight. The stories were originally published between 1949 and 1960 in Galaxy, If, and other science fiction magazines. There is an introduction by Anthony Boucher.

The book contains the story "To Serve Man", which was later adapted for television.

== Contents ==
- Introduction
- "To Serve Man"
- "Idiot Stick"
- "Thing of Beauty"
- "The Enemy"
- "Not with a Bang"
- "Babel II"
- "Anachron"
- "Special Delivery"
- "You're Another"
- "Time Enough"
- "Extempore"
- "Cabin Boy"
- "The Last Word"
