= Masters of Evolution =

1959 novel by Damon Knight

- Cover of Masters of Evolution
- Author: Damon Knight
- Cover artist: Ed Emshwiller
- Language: English
- Genre: Science fiction
- Publisher: Ace Books
- Publication date: 1959
- Publication place: United States
- Media type: Print (Paperback) (magazine)
- Pages: 96

Masters of Evolution is a 1959 science fiction novel by American writer Damon Knight. It first appeared in 1954 in Galaxy Science Fiction as the novella "Natural State". Knight subsequently expanded the text by about 5000 words, and the longer version was published by Ace Books in 1959 as Masters of Evolution, in a dos-a-dos paperback that included George O. Smith's Fire in the Heavens (Ace Double D-375).

== Synopsis ==
In the near future, the world is divided into two antagonistic groups: city dwellers and country dwellers, called "muckfeet". The muckfeet control most of the land area and have a much higher population. The mayor of New York convinces a popular actor, Alvah Gustad, to negotiate an agreement with the muckfeet: technology in exchange for their scarce metals. Alvah reluctantly agrees and is given a chance to present his wares at a fair in the Midwest. No one is interested; an altercation ensues and Alvah realizes that he is stranded. He is taken in by a pretty young woman named B. J.; gradually he comes to accept and understand the muckfeet way of life, which includes novel uses of genetic engineering in place of machines. Alvah falls in love with B. J. and when the cities launch an attack on the muckfeet, Alvah is forced to reexamine his beliefs about the superiority of the city way of life.

== Reception ==
The Encyclopedia of Science Fiction considered that when "Natural State" was "expanded from (its original novella form)", it lost its "compressed drivenness". Kirkus Reviews was far harsher, calling it a "mediocre, tired comic's vision of city folk and country types in collision".

== Origins ==
Mike Ashley has noted that the story was shaped by editor Horace Gold, and that Knight "accepted that the end result was better than his original", but was disappointed that the original "had been still-born".
