= Turning On =

- First edition
- Author: Damon Knight
- Cover artist: Ann Crews and Donald Crews
- Language: English
- Genre: Science fiction
- Publisher: Doubleday
- Publication date: 1966
- Publication place: United States
- Media type: Print (hardback)
- Pages: 180 pp

Turning On is a collection of thirteen science fiction short stories by American writer Damon Knight. The stories were originally published between 1951 and 1965 in Galaxy, Analog and other science fiction magazines.

An Ace paperback reprinting in 1967 omitted the story "The Handler". This story was also omitted in the 1966 reissue of the Doubleday hardback edition.

== Contents ==
- "Semper Fi"
- "The Big Pat Boom"
- "Man in the Jar"
- "The Handler"
- "Mary"
- "Auto Da Fé"
- "To the Pure"
- "Eripmav"
- "Backward, O Time"
- "The Night of Lies"
- "Maid to Measure"
- "Collector's Item"
- "A Likely Story"
- "Don't Live in the Past"
