= Damon Knight =

American science fiction writer, editor and critic (1922–2002)

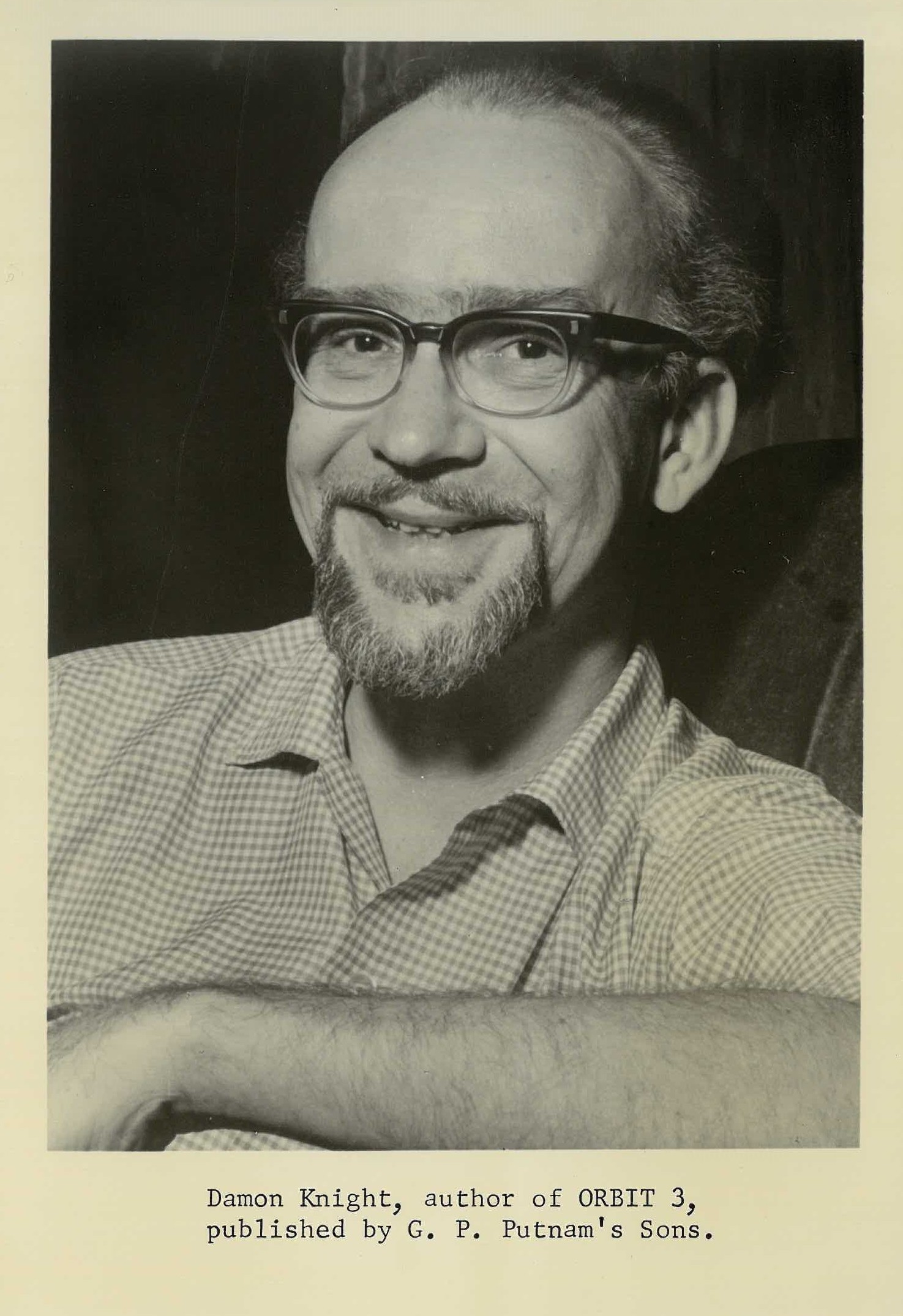
- Born: Damon Francis Knight; September 19, 1922; Baker City, Oregon, U.S.
- Died: April 15, 2002 (aged 79); Eugene, Oregon, U.S.
- Occupations: Author; editor; critic
- Spouse: Helen M. Schlaz (m. 1960) Kate Wilhelm (m. 1963)
- Writing career
- Pen name: Conanight, Stuart Fleming (Note: Futurians Chester Cohen and Knight used the name Conanight jointly for two 1942 illustrations. Knight wrote three 1943–1944 short stories as Stuart Fleming.)
- Period: 1940–2002
- Genres: Science fiction, primarily short stories
- Website: damonknightlibrary.com

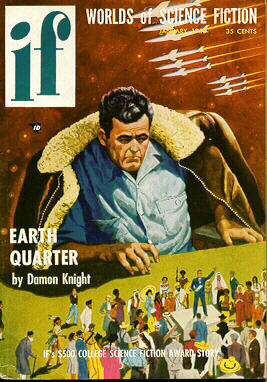
Knight's novella "The Earth Quarter" was the cover story of the January 1955 issue of If

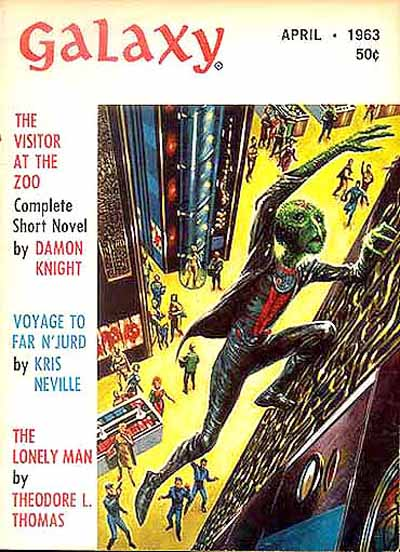
Knight's novella "The Visitor at the Zoo" took the cover of the April 1963 issue of Galaxy Science Fiction

Damon Francis Knight (September 19, 1922 – April 15, 2002) was an American science fiction author, editor, and critic. He wrote "To Serve Man", a 1950 short story adapted for The Twilight Zone. He was married to fellow writer Kate Wilhelm in 1963.

== Biography ==
Knight was born in Baker City, Oregon, in 1922, and grew up in Hood River, Oregon. He entered science-fiction fandom at the age of eleven and published two issues of a fanzine titled Snide. He referred to the fanzine as his "passport out of the Pacific Northwest".

Knight's first professional sale was a cartoon drawing to a science-fiction magazine, Amazing Stories. His first story, "The Itching Hour", appeared in the Summer 1940 number of Futuria Fantasia, edited and published by Ray Bradbury. "Resilience" followed in the February 1941 number of Stirring Science Stories, edited by Donald A. Wollheim. An editorial error made the latter story's ending incomprehensible; it was reprinted in a 1978 magazine in four pages with a two-page introduction by Knight.

In 1941, he completed his studies at the Works Progress Administration Art Center in Salem, Oregon. He then moved to New York and joined the Futurians. During this time, he made his first story sale. One of his short stories describes paranormal disruption of a science fiction fan group and contains cameo appearances of various Futurians and others under thinly-disguised names; for instance, non-Futurian SF writer H. Beam Piper is identified as "H. Dreyne Fifer".

Knight's forte was the short story; he is widely acknowledged as having been a master of the genre. To the general public he is best known as the author of "To Serve Man", a 1950 short story adapted for The Twilight Zone. It won a 50-year Retro-Hugo in 2001 as the best short story of 1950. Knight was also a science fiction critic, a career which began when he wrote in 1945 that A. E. van Vogt was "a pygmy who has learned to operate an overgrown typewriter." He ceased reviewing when Fantasy & Science Fiction refused to publish his review of Judith Merril's novel The Tomorrow People. These reviews were later collected in In Search of Wonder.

Algis Budrys wrote that Knight and "William Atheling Jr." (James Blish) had "transformed the reviewer's trade in the field", in Knight's case "without the guidance of his own prior example". The term "idiot plot", a story that only functions because almost everyone in it is an idiot, became well known through Knight's frequent use of it in his reviews, though he believed the term was probably invented by Blish. Knight's only non-Retro-Hugo Award was for "Best Reviewer" in 1956.

He established and edited a science fiction anthology called Orbit, which was published from 1966 to 1980.

Knight was the founder of the Science Fiction and Fantasy Writers of America (SFWA), cofounder of the National Fantasy Fan Federation, cofounder of the Milford Writer's Workshop, and cofounder of the Clarion Writers Workshop. The SFWA officers and past presidents named Knight its 13th Grand Master in 1994 (presented 1995). After his death, the associated award was renamed the Damon Knight Memorial Grand Master Award in his honor. The Science Fiction Hall of Fame inducted him in 2003.

Knight moved back to Oregon in 1976, and until his death, he lived in Eugene, Oregon, with his second wife, author Kate Wilhelm. Some of his papers are held in the University of Oregon Special Collections and University Archive, and some are held at Syracuse University.

He died on April 15, 2002, at the age of 79.

== Selected works ==
=== Novels ===
- Hell's Pavement (1955)
- A for Anything (1961) (original version titled The People Maker, 1959)
- Masters of Evolution (1959)
- The Sun Saboteurs (1961)
- Beyond the Barrier (1964)
- Mind Switch (1965)
- Double Meaning (1965)
- The Earth Quarter (1970)
- World without Children (1970)
- The World and Thorinn (1980)
- The Man in the Tree (1984)
- CV (1985)
- The Observers (1988)
- A Reasonable World (1991)
- God's Nose (1991)
- Why Do Birds (1992)
- Humpty Dumpty: An Oval (1996)

=== Short stories and other writings ===
- "The Third Little Green Man" (1948)
- "PS's Feature Flash" (1948)
- "Not with a Bang" (1949)
- "The Star Beast" (1949)
- "To Serve Man" (1950)
- "Ask Me Anything" (1951)
- "Don't Live in the Past" (1951)
- "Cabin Boy" (1951)
- "Catch that Martian" (1952)
- "The Analogues" (1952)
- "Beachcomber" (1952)
- "Ticket to Anywhere" (1952)
- "Anachron" (1953)
- "Babel II" (1953)
- "Four in One" (1953)
- "Special Delivery" (1953)
- "Natural State" (1954)
- "Rule Golden" (1954)
- "The Country of the Kind" (1955)
- "Dulcie and Decorum" (1955)
- "You're Another" (1955)
- "This Way to the Regress" (1956)
- "Extempore" (1956)
- "The Last Word" (1956)
- "Stranger Station" (1956)
- "Dio" (1957)
- "The Dying Man" (1957)
- "An Eye for a What?" (1957)
- "The Enemy" (1958)
- "Be My Guest" (1958)
- "Eripmav" (1958)
- "Idiot Stick" (1958)
- "Thing of Beauty" (1958)
- "To Be Continued" (1959)
- "The Handler" (1960)
- "Time Enough" (1960)
- "Auto-Da-Fe" (1961)
- A Century of Science Fiction (1962) (editor)
- "The Visitor at the Zoo" (1963)
- "The Big Pat Boom" (1963)
- "An Ancient Madness" (1964)
- God's Nose (1964)
- Maid to Measure (1964)
- "Shall the Dust Praise Thee?" (1967)
- "Masks'" (1968)
- "The Star Below" (1968)
- I See You (1976)
- Forever (1981)
- O (1983)
- Point of View (1985) (illustrated by Chris Van Allsburg)
- Strangers on Paradise (1986)
- Not a Creature (1993)
- Fortyday (1994)
- Life Edit (1996)
- "Double Meaning"
- "In the Beginning"

=== Literary criticism and analysis ===
- In Search of Wonder (1956) (collected reviews and critical pieces)
- Creating Short Fiction (1981) (advice on writing short stories)
- Turning Points (editor/contributor: critical anthology)
- Orbit (editor)
- The Futurians (1977, memoir/history)

=== Short story collections ===
- Far Out (1961) (contains "To Serve Man")
- In Deep (1963) (contains "The Country of the Kind")
- Off Center (1965) (contains "Be My Guest")
- Turning On (1966)
- The Best of Damon Knight (1976)

== See also ==
- List of people from Eugene, Oregon
- List of science-fiction authors
- Ursula K. Le Guin

== Sources ==
- Aldiss, Brian W.; Harrison, Harry (1976). Hell's Cartographers. London: Futura. ISBN 0-86007-907-4.
- Gunn, James E.; Candelaria, Matthew (2005). Speculations on Speculation: Theories of Science Fiction. Lanham, MD: Scarecrow Press. ISBN 0-8108-4902-X.
- Pohl, Frederik (2002). The SFWA Grand Masters. Vol. 3. New York: Macmillan. ISBN 0-312-86876-6.
- Stanyard, Stewart T. (2006). Dimensions Behind the Twilight Zone: A Backstage Tribute to Television's Groundbreaking Series. Chicago: ECW Press. ISBN 978-1-55022-744-4.
