= List of short stories by Harry Harrison =

This is a list of all short stories published by science-fiction author Harry Harrison, along with the collections they appeared in, if any.

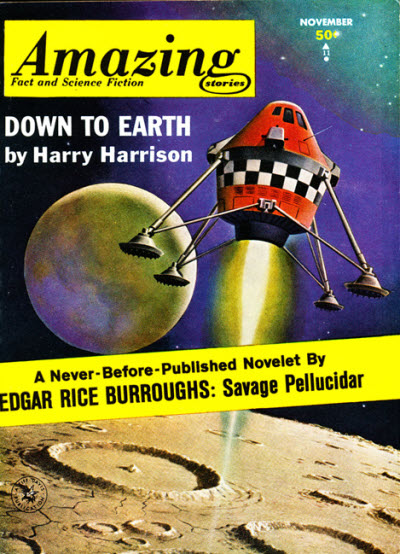
Harrison's novelette "Down to Earth" took the cover of the November 1963 issue of Amazing Stories

Story	Publication Date	Two Tales and Eight Tomorrows (1965)	War with the Robots (1967)	Prime Number (1970)	One Step from Earth (1970)	The Best of Harry Harrison (1976)	Stainless Steel Visions (1992)	Galactic Dreams (1994)	50 In 50 (2001)	Notes/Other Sources
Rock Diver	1951								Yes	
An Artist's Life	1953								Yes	
Web of the Worlds	1953									(with Katherine MacLean)
Navy Day	1954									
The Velvet Glove	1956		Yes						Yes	
World in the Balance	1957									
The Stainless Steel Rat	1957									Later expanded into a novel (1961).
Welcoming Committee	1957								Yes	
Captain Bedlam	1957	Yes							Yes	
Open All Doors	1958									(with Hubert Pritchard)
The Repairman	1958		Yes				Yes		Yes	
The Robot Who Wanted to Know	1958		Yes					Yes	Yes	
Web of the Norns	1958									(with Katherine Maclean)
Simulated Trainer	1958		Yes					Yes	Yes	variant title: Trainee For Mars
The World Otalmi Made	1958									
Arm of the Law	1958		Yes						Yes	
The Robots Strike	1959									
I See You (Robot Justice)	1959		Yes						Yes	
Hitch Hiker	1959									The Saint Mystery Magazine, December 1959
The Misplaced Battleship	1960									
Case of the Comic Killer										
The K-Factor	1960								Yes	
Survival Planet	1961		Yes				Yes		Yes	
Toy Shop	1962			Yes			Yes		Yes	
Death at 60,000	1962									Published in the British edition The Saint Mystery Magazine, May, 1962
Terror in Tivoli	1962									Published in the British edition The Saint Mystery Magazine, June, 1962
War with the Robots	1962		Yes							
Death in Mexico	1962									
The Pliable Animal	1962	Yes							Yes	
The Streets of Ashkelon	1962	Yes				Yes	Yes		Yes	Variant title: An Alien Agony
Captain Honario Harpplayer, R.N.	1963	Yes				Yes			Yes	
Fuzz-Head										
Down to Earth	1963			Yes				Yes	Yes	
Ms. Found in a Bottle Washed Up On the Sands of Time	1964									Poem
Incident in the IND	1964			Yes					Yes	
Final Encounter	1964	Yes							Yes	
According to His Abilities	1964	Yes								
Unto My Manifold Dooms	1964	Yes								Variant title: The Many Dooms
How the Old World Died	1964								Yes	
Portrait of the Artist	1964	Yes				Yes	Yes		Yes	
Rescue Operation	1964	Yes				Yes	Yes		Yes	
The Starsloggers	1964									Introduction of Bill, The Galactic Hero
They're Playing Our Song	1964									
Not Me, Not Amos Cabot!	1964			Yes		Yes**	Yes		Yes	
Moon Sport	1964									Published in Daily Mail Boy's Annual 1964
A Matter of Timing	1965									(Written under the pen name Hank Dempsey), CWACC
Famous First Words	1965			Yes				Yes		
The Outcast	1965									
I Always Do What Teddy Says	1965	Yes				Yes		Yes	Yes	
At Last, the True Story of Frankenstein	1965					Yes		Yes	Yes	
The Greatest Car in the World	1965			Yes					Yes	
Rock Pilot	1965									
Mute Milton	1966			Yes		Yes		Yes	Yes	
The Gods Themselves Throw Incense	1966								Yes	
CWACC Strikes Again	1966									
Contact Man	1966			Yes						
The Voice of the CWACC	1966									
A Criminal Act	1967			Yes		Yes		Yes	Yes	
You Men of Violence	1967			Yes					Yes	
The Man From P.I.G.	1967								Yes	Collected in The Men From P.I.G. and R.O.B.O.T..
The Fairly Civil Service / A Civil Service Servant	1967			Yes					Yes	
I Have My Vigil	1968					Yes			Yes	
The Secret of Stonehenge	1968			Yes			Yes			
Waiting Place	1968				Yes	Yes				
The Powers of Observation	1968			Yes						
No War, Or Battle's Sound	1968				Yes					
If	1969			Yes		Yes		Yes	Yes	
From Fanaticism, or For Reward	1969				Yes	Yes			Yes	
The Ghoul Squad	1969			Yes						
The Man from R.O.B.O.T.	1969									Collected in The Men From P.I.G. and R.O.B.O.T..
Pressure	1969				Yes				Yes	
The Ever-Branching Tree	1969					Yes			Yes	
By the Falls	1970					Yes			Yes	
One Step from Earth	1970				Yes					
The Life Preservers	1970				Yes					
Heavy Duty	1970				Yes				Yes	
A Tale of the Ending	1970				Yes					
Wife to the Lord	1970				Yes					
Commando Raid	1970			Yes			Yes			
The Final Battle	1970			Yes						
The Finest Hunter in the World	1970			Yes						
The Pad: a Story of the Day After Tomorrow	1970			Yes				Yes		
American Dead	1970								Yes	
Brave Newer World	1971					Yes	Yes		Yes	
The Wicked Flee	1971					Yes *				
Roommates	1971					Yes	Yes		Yes	
Strangers	1972									
We Ate the Whole Thing	1973					Yes**				
The Defensive Bomber	1973									
An Honest Day's Work	1973					Yes			Yes	
The Mothballed Spaceship	1973					Yes	Yes			Features characters from the Deathworld novels.
Ad Astra	1974									
The Whatever-I-Type-Is-True Machine (with Barry N. Malzberg)	1974									
Space Rats of the CCC	1974					Yes		Yes	Yes	
Speed of the Cheetah, Roar of the Lion	1975								Yes	
Run from the Fire	1975									
The Last Train	1976									
Pass the Book	1978									
The Greening of the Green	1978								Yes	
All Wheels, Gears and Cogs	1979									
The Day After the End of the World	1980								Yes	
A Fragment of Manuscript	1980									
The Year 2000 in Birmingham	1981									
The Return of the Stainless Steel Rat	1981									
A Dog and His Boy	2002									
After the Storm	1985								Yes	
The View from the Top of the Tower	1986									
In the Beginning	1986									
Ni Venos, Doktoro Zamenhof, Ni Venos!	1987									
The Curse of the Unborn Living Dead	1988									
Luncheon in Budapest	1989									
The Fourth Law of Robotics	1989									available in Foundation's Friends: Stories in Honour of Isaac Asimov
Samson in the Temple of Science	1989									
Tragedy in Tibet	1990									
A Letter from the Pope (with Tom Shippey)	1990									
Dawn of the Endless Night	1992								Yes	Printed In The Ultimate Dinosaur, features material from West Of Eden.
The Golden Years of the Stainless Steel Rat	1993						Yes			Reprinted in the collection Stainless Steel Visions
Bill, the Galactic Hero's Happy Holiday	1994							Yes		
The Road to the Year 3000	1999								Yes	
