= Bill, the Galactic Hero on the Planet of Bottled Brains =

Bill, the Galactic Hero on the Planet of Bottled Brains (BtGH:PoBB) is a novel by Harry Harrison and Robert Sheckley, published in 1990. (Note: Listed as "volume 2" in this ref, since it is the second novel in the 'on the planet of' portion of the overall story arc, immediately following Harrison's Bill the Galactic Hero On the Planet of Robot Slaves of 1989.)

== Development ==
PoBB is one of the novels (Note: The 1990 novel is listed as either volume two because it follows the 1989 'on the planet of' novel by Harrison, or as number three counting the 1965 original eponymous novel by Harrison. There is also the 1964 short story which does not include the name of the series-protagonist in the title. The sources differ as to which early materials are part of the literary canon for the series with respect to enumeration, see other footnotes for details.) in the Bill the Galactic Hero series, and the first (Note: True regardless of whether or not this novel is considered as 'volume two' following Harrison's 1989 novel, or as 'number three' with the additional inclusion of Harrison's 1965 eponymous novel. The existence of Harrison's short story The Starsloggers which introduced Bill as a character but without using his name in the title, adds to the broader story-arc.) which was not authored solely by Harrison. After Sheckley's initial collaboration with Harrison in 1990, the following year four additional novels in the series were released, all with Harrison as co-author, most with the same Bill, the Galactic Hero on the Planet of... titles, but involving differing collaborators: Tasteless Pleasure with David Bischoff, Zombie Vampires with Jack C. Haldeman, Ten Thousand Bars with Bischoff again, and finally Bill the Galactic Hero: The Final Incoherent Adventure with David Harris. In 1964, when Harrison had originally introduced the character of Bill in the short story The Starsloggers, thirty years later Harrison wrote a post-novelization short story entitled Bill, the Galactic Hero's Happy Holiday which was in Harrison's Galactic Dreams collection of 1994.

== Plot ==
PoBB is about the continued adventures of the protagonist Bill, in extraterrestrial universe involving faster-than-light space travel.

== Reception ==
A review by David Langford was largely negative, noting that many of Sheckley's long-running themes were found in PoBB—humor, abrupt literary transitions, malfunctioning computers, and philosophical digressions—but calling the implementation of those recurring thematic elements in PoBB "pale echos of... the remembered sparkle" generated by Scheckley's previous works. George Mann characterized Sheckley's overall work as "witty satirical fiction... comic and thought-provoking [science fiction]" and had earlier mentioned PoBB as one of Sheckley's late-period works. The book was also reviewed in several zines related to science fiction when it was first published in 1990.
