= Terminus Est =

Terminus est is a Latin phrase that can be translated roughly as "it is the end" or "it is the limit". It may refer to:

- Terminus Est, a fictional sword wielded by Severian in the novel series The Book of the New Sun
- Terminus Est, a fictional sword in the video game Castlevania: Symphony of the Night
- Terminus Est, a fictional sword in the video game Path of Exile
- Terminus Est, a fictional character in the light novel series Bladedance of Elementalers (probably named after the Book of the New Sun example, since she is the spirit of a sword)
- Terminus Est, a fictional spacecraft in the wargame Warhammer 40,000
- Terminus Est, a Canadian technical death metal band consisting of Hannes Grossmann, Edward Gryn, and Olivier Pinard
- Terminus Est, a 2019 EP by Eternal Champion
- "Terminus Est", a short story by Barry N. Malzberg in the 1970 short story collection Nova 1
- "Terminus Est", a song by Julia Ecklar from the 1986 album Divine Intervention
