= Bill, the Galactic Hero (film) =

American science fiction film

- Directed by: Alex Cox; Danny Beard (co-director); Merritt Crocker (co-director); Amanda Gostomski (co-director); Alicia Ramírez (co-director); Raziel Scher (co-director); Jordan Thompson (co-director)
- Written by: Alex Cox
- Based on: Bill, the Galactic Hero by Harry Harrison
- Produced by: Sultan Saeed Al Darmaki; Malcolm Edwards; David Stewart Zink; Brigid Igoe; Kaleb Tholen; Claudio Bottaccini; Kyle Curry; Charles Gill; George P. Snoga; Simon Tams; Steven Christopher Wallace
- Starring: James Miller
- Cinematography: Robert Ortega; Grant Speich
- Edited by: Mia Debakker
- Music by: David Bashford
- Production companies: Biting Sheep Productions; University of Colorado Boulder
- Release date: December 12, 2014
- Running time: 90 minutes
- Country: United States
- Language: English

Bill, the Galactic Hero is a 2014 science fiction student film directed by Alex Cox and six student co-directors based on Harry Harrison's 1965 novel of the same name.

== Plot synopsis ==
Bill is a farm hand who is drugged and shanghaied into the Space Troopers. Bill initially works as a fuse tender but when his ship is struck by enemy fire Bill finds himself the only remaining soldier capable of firing on the enemy Chingers. He destroys an enemy fleet with a lucky shot and is proclaimed a hero. He becomes lost in a labyrinth of bureaucracy, eventually recruiting his own younger brother into military service to the chagrin of his mother.

== Cast ==
- James Miller as Bill
- Devon Wycoff as Deathwish Drang
- Jesse Lee Pacheco as Sixth Class Tembo
- Kaitlin McManus as Bown Brown / Sgt. Ferkel
- Eddy Jordan as X / Pinkteron
- Hayden Winston as Chaplain / Laundry Officer
- Brittany Handler as 1st Class Spleen
- Nick Wagner as Old Sarge / Corp. DeSalius
- Bradley Allf as Deplanned Outlaw
- Lily Grisafi as Eager Beager
- Pablo Kjolseth as The Emperor
- Anneka Kumli as Mother / Officer 1
- Susan Sebanc as All Robots (voice)
- Frank Vidana as Surgeon
- Shayn Herndon

== Production ==
Alex Cox had initially optioned the rights to a film version of Harry Harrison's 1965 novel in 1983 as he was completing Repo Man. The project met with studio resistance and remained unmade until 2012 when Alex Cox had begun teaching film production at the University of Colorado at Boulder. He had the idea to have his students film an adaptation of the novel and suggested the idea to Harrison, who granted Cox an academic license to produce a student film and was working with Cox on the screenplay for the film at the time of his death in 2012. In March 2013, Cox launched a Kickstarter campaign, hoping to raise $100,000 to shoot the film. The campaign exceeded the goal and raised $114,957 from 1,106 backers. Cox also succeeded in getting numerous film professionals to work on a royalties basis. The film went into production in October. Scenes were shot in university buildings. Iggy Pop, who wrote and performed the song "Repo Man" for Alex Cox's 1984 film, also wrote and performed the theme song for Bill, the Galactic Hero.

== Release ==
The film premiered in Boulder, Colorado on December 12, 2014. It gained positive reviews. It was later shown on New Year's Eve at the Clinton Street Theater.
