= West of Eden =

1984 novel by Harry Harrison

- First ed.
- Author: Harry Harrison
- Cover artist: David Schleinkofer
- Language: English
- Series: West of Eden
- Release number: 1
- Genre: Science fiction, Alternate history
- Publisher: Granada, Bantam Books
- Publication date: August 1984
- Publication place: United Kingdom
- Media type: Print (Hardcover)
- Pages: 578
- ISBN: 0-246-12002-9 (U.K.); 0-553-05065-6 (U.S.)
- OCLC: 12457810
- Dewey Decimal: 813.5/4
- LC Class: PS3558.A667 W4 1984
- Followed by: Winter in Eden

West of Eden is a 1984 science fiction novel by American writer Harry Harrison. The title can be seen as a reference to the Book of Genesis. Adam and Eve are driven east out of the Garden of Eden. Being "west of Eden", then, is a reference to the counterhistorical premise of the novel.

== Premise ==
In the parallel universe of this novel, Earth was not struck by an asteroid 65 million years before the present. Consequently, the Cretaceous–Paleogene extinction event which wiped out the dinosaurs and other related reptiles never happened, leaving the way clear for an intelligent species to eventually evolve from mosasaurs, a family of Late Cretaceous marine lizards closely related to the modern monitor lizards.

The intelligent reptiloid species is called the Yilanè, and represents the dominant life form on most of the planet. However, during the evolutionary process, the species became non-viable on the North American continent and Caribbean area, leaving them free of Yilanè for millions of years and opening an ecological niche for a top predator. A human-like species, the Tanu, evolved to fill the niche in North America, but are only found on that continent. Unlike humans, which evolved from African primates, the Tanu have evolved from a lineage of New World monkey. By the time the novel begins, the humanoids have reached a late Stone Age level of technology and culture, with a number of societies having developed farming skills.

The Yilanè, having had millions of years of civilization, have an advanced society primarily based on the mastery of the biological sciences, especially genetic engineering, so much so that almost every tool and artifact they use is a modified lifeform. Their boats were originally squids, their submarines are enhanced ichthyosaurs (here called uruketos), while their guns are modified monitor lizards which eject projectiles using pressurised gas.

The Yilanè are a matriarchal society. The females control all political, military, and scientific aspects of the culture and keep the males segregated. Males are primarily poets and artisans, and enjoy dull, pampered lifestyles. Repeated matings will kill males, so they are generally very wary of the females. The Yilanè language is incredibly complex, based on sounds, color (the Yilanè are able to alter the skin color on parts of their body, notably the hands, akin to chameleons) and body movements, and a key factor in social status among females is how well the language is mastered. As their emotions are directly and immediately translated into the movement of their bodies, Yilanè cannot lie. In order to deceive others, they may only restrict their movements or go into a state of immobility until the emotion or thought has passed.

The Yilanè normally are inseparable from their society; if a city leader casts out a member of the Yilanè society, in a ritual which involves taking away her name, then the cast-out member will immediately die due to a reaction in her brain to the fear of being cast out. For this reason the Yilanè society has remained a monoculture for millions of years, with no divisions. However, by the time of the events in the novel, a new schism in the society has emerged for the first time, consisting of a group who call themselves the "Daughters of Life" (known as "Daughters of Death" to outsiders). The Daughters of Life are the first to reject the regimented society of the Yilanè, in favour of a higher power, the "Spirit of Life". Because of this belief in a power greater than that of the society's leaders, the usual fatal reaction to being cast out does not occur when a Daughter of Life is expelled by a leader.

== Plot summary ==
The story revolves around the eventual discovery of the American continents by the Yilanè, who are searching for new resources and territories for colonization. Being reptiloid and cold-blooded, they target tropical and sub-tropical zones.

Eventually, they encounter the humanoids, whom they regard as barely sentient animals. The humanoids, in their turn, are terrified of the Yilanè. As the winters become colder the Tanu are forced to travel south into warmer climates to hunt, onto Yilanè territory. It is not long before a state of conflict exists between the two species.

The central characters are Vaintè, an ambitious Yilanè; Stallan, her vicious and obedient adjutant; and Kerrick, a "ustuzou" (the Yilanè word for mammal) who is captured by the reptiloids as a boy, and raised as a Yilanè. Kerrick eventually escapes to rejoin his own people, ultimately becoming a leader. Another notable Yilanè character is Enge, the leader of a faction of pacifist Yilanè who reject the militaristic and violent attitudes of their culture. This group is violently opposed by most other Yilanè, especially Vaintè. Enge befriends Kerrick, and acts as his teacher, while he lives with the Yilanè.

After Kerrick escapes he joins other humanoid tribes and journeys over the mountains, being pursued all the while by Vaintè, who wants nothing more than the absolute destruction of the ustuzou. After a number of victories, Kerrick realizes that despite the losses inflicted upon the Yilanè, the Yilanè will never stop pursuing the humanoids. Kerrick organizes an expedition back to the Yilanè city of Alpèasak where he was held as a boy, and burns it down. The North American continent is freed of the Yilanè.

== Characters ==
- Kerrick: The main protagonist of the story, a human raised among the Yilanè but leaves to live with his own people. Eventually he becomes their chief and helps to destroy the Yilanè capital.
- Vaintè: The main antagonist of the story, she is a vain and selfish Yilanè who hates Kerrick and wants to kill him.
- Herilak: Uncle of Kerrick, he was the brother-in-law of his father and the best hunter in the tribe.
- Armun: The lover of Kerrick. She was shunned by other members of her tribe for having a harelip, but Kerrick falls in love with her despite it. Later she gives birth to their son.
- Enge: A Yilanè who is what her people call a "Daughter of Life", a member of a group who have a high regard for life, including humans.
- Stallan: A Yilanè who shares Vaintè's desire to kill Kerrick and all of humanity.

=== Creatures ===
- Enteesenat: Elasmosaurus
- Eisekol: Steller's sea cow
- Elinou: Coelurosauria
- Epetruk: Tyrannosaurus
- Greatdeer: Irish elk
- Huruksast: Monoclonius
- Longtooth: Smilodon
- Mastodon: Mastodon
- Nenitesk: Triceratops
- Onetsenast: Stegosaurus
- Tarakast: Segnosaurus
- Uruketo: Ichthyosaurus
- Uruktop: Psittacosaurus
- Urukub: Brontosaurus

== Sequels ==
The story continues in two sequels, Winter in Eden (1986) and Return to Eden (1988).

== Reception ==
Dave Langford reviewed West of Eden for White Dwarf #59, and stated that "It's the density of background detail which makes this, not a great book, but the best Harrison for some while. Nice illustrations, too."
