= The Stainless Steel Rat =

Fictional antihero of comic science fiction novels by Harry Harrison

James Bolivar diGriz
- First cover printing to The Stainless Steel Rat by Harry Harrison
- First appearance: The Stainless Steel Rat (1957)
- Created by: Harry Harrison

In-universe information
- Alias: The Stainless Steel Rat
- Nickname: Slippery Jim
- Species: Human
- Gender: Male
- Occupation: Con man Bank robber Criminal mastermind
- Spouse: Angelina diGriz

James Bolivar diGriz, alias "Slippery Jim" and "The Stainless Steel Rat", is a fictional character and a series of comic science fiction novels written by Harry Harrison.

== Description ==
James Bolivar diGriz goes by many aliases, including "Slippery Jim" and "The Stainless Steel Rat". He is a futuristic con man, thief, and all-round rascal. He is charming and quick-witted. He is also a master of disguise and martial arts, an accomplished bank robber, a criminal mastermind, an expert on breaking and entering, and (perhaps most usefully) a skilled liar. Master of self-rationalization, the Rat frequently justifies his crimes by arguing that he is providing society with entertainment; and besides which, he only steals from institutions that he believes have insurance coverage and so will be able to recoup their losses. He displays a strong sense of morality, albeit in a much more restricted sense than is traditional. For example, diGriz will steal without compunction, but deplores killing.

The character was introduced in Harrison's short story "The Stainless Steel Rat", first published in 1957 in Astounding magazine. The story introduces the Rat, who has just carried out a successful larceny operation, and subsequently details a complex bank robbery the Rat pulls off with ease; however, he is outfoxed by the mysterious "Special Corps"—a crime-fighting organization staffed with former criminals—and recruited by them in order to fight crime. Harrison used the story, with minor modifications, as the introduction to the series's first full-length novel, also called The Stainless Steel Rat. Like other characters created by Harrison, the Rat is a speaker of Esperanto and advocates atheism.

== Books ==
There are 12 works in the Stainless Steel Rat series.

Title	Release date	In-series chronology	Notes
The Stainless Steel Rat	1961	4	Large sections of the story first appeared in Astounding as two novelettes: The Stainless Steel Rat (1957) and The Misplaced Battleship (1960). These were reworked into the opening chapters of the novel.; re-issued in Hardcover (1970): Published Walker and Co., Jacket Illustrator Jack Gaughan (two variations), LC #74-103005 [First Edition]; re-issued in paperback (1986): ISBN 0-441-77924-7
Jim believes he has pulled off a successful bank job, but is out-conned into working for the Special Corps, the elite law-enforcement and spy agency led by the former greatest crook in the Galaxy, Harold Peters Inskipp, and composed mostly of ex-criminals like himself. He believes he has escaped from the Corps, and meets his love interest, Angelina—also a criminal genius, but lacking in Jim's relatively high moral codes and strictures against killing. She is building an illegal space battleship on an otherwise peaceful planet. Angelina was born unattractive and committed crimes to pay for her transformation into a beautiful woman; her psychological traumas are treated when Jim captures her, but she retains her allure and her criminal tendencies and joins in the Special Corps as Jim's partner.
The Stainless Steel Rat's Revenge	1970	5	re-issued in paperback (1986): ISBN 0-441-77912-3
Jim and Angelina get married, but rapidly get involved in something that so far has proven impossible in the galaxy—the planet Cliaand has successfully been invading other worlds. Jim is sent to infiltrate and investigate, and discovers the mysterious Gray Men behind Cliaand's success, receives aid from a resistance movement composed mostly of feisty warrior women, and becomes father of twins (James and Bolivar).
The Stainless Steel Rat Saves the World	1972	6	First serialized in 1971 in If magazine in three parts. Parts 2 and 3 were titled, respectively, The Cast Iron Rat and The Stainless Steel Rat's Return. (The latter should not be confused with the Return of... board game or ...Rat Returns 2010 novel).; re-issued in paperback (1989): ISBN 0-441-77913-1
A master criminal from the far future, "He", is attempting to erase the Special Corps from its timeline. Jim travels to 1975 Earth, and then to Napoleonic England, to stop He from destroying the timeline—but discovers that his own actions might have brought He into being! Finally He is trapped in a time loop, saving the Corps.
The Stainless Steel Rat Wants You	1978	7	re-issued in paperback (1985): ISBN 0-553-27611-5
After freeing his family from various forms of incarceration (Angelina from the clutches of the Interstellar Income Tax people and his now teenage twins from their prison-like boarding school), Jim saves the all-human galaxy from invading aliens. Additionally, two more Corps are revealed to exist—the Morality Corps, whose main concern is that all human actions abide by their code of morality, and the Time Corps, who patrol time itself to prevent any unauthorized tampering with the flow of time. Both new corps outrank the Special Corps; Inskipp is duty-bound to work with them, but with some covert help from Inskipp and overt help from Angelina, Jim finds a way to work around them.
The Stainless Steel Rat for President	1982	8	re-issued in paperback (1987): ISBN 0-553-27612-3
Jim and Angelina enjoy a belated honeymoon on a planet run by a dictator who rigs elections to keep himself in office, so the Rat (with his family's help) sets himself up as a rival candidate. Very much a satire on banana republic politics and a parody of adventures set in Latin America.
A Stainless Steel Rat is Born	1985	1	paperback (1986): ISBN 0-553-27942-4
A novel chronicling the beginning of the Stainless Steel Rat's career. Jim intentionally gets caught trying to rob a bank so that he will go to jail where he can learn from the masters of crime, only to realize (too late) that the true masters would never get caught.
The Stainless Steel Rat Gets Drafted	1987	2	original hardback: ISBN 0-553-05220-9; re-issued in paperback (1991): ISBN 0-553-27307-8
Takes place immediately following A Stainless Steel Rat is Born. Jim hunts the man who killed his mentor, but in the process must save a pacifist planet from an imminent attack by a military dictatorship led by the same man.
The Golden Years of the Stainless Steel Rat	1993	12	Published in Stainless Steel Visions by Harry Harrison (Tor 0-312-85245-2), a collection of 12 reprinted stories, one original.
An original short story which finds Jim in Terminal Penitentiary, a prison where over-the-hill crooks are sent.
The Stainless Steel Rat Sings the Blues	1994	3	original hardback: ISBN 0-553-09612-5; paperback (1995): ISBN 0-553-56939-2
The Stainless Steel Rat (in the same earlier timeline as Is Born and Gets Drafted) goes to a prison colony planet to retrieve an alien artifact, which he must find in thirty days, or the slow-acting poison he was administered will take its effect.
The Stainless Steel Rat Goes to Hell	1996	9	original hardback: ISBN 0-312-86063-3; paperback (1998): ISBN 0-8125-5107-9
In the later timeline (to which the stories have henceforth returned), Jim searches for his wife, who is abducted by a con man who preys on religious believers, swindling them out of their money and then enslaving them in his mining operation.
The Stainless Steel Rat Joins the Circus	1999	10	original hardback: ISBN 0-312-86934-7; paperback (2000): ISBN 0-8125-7535-0
Jim is hired by a businessman to investigate thefts; the clues lead him to suspect a roaming circus, which he infiltrates.
The Stainless Steel Rat Returns	2010	11	The first three chapters were published as The Stainless Steel Rat and the Pernicious Porcuswine in the anthology Gateways (2010), edited by Elizabeth Anne Hull.; original hardback: ISBN 0-7653-2441-5
The final Stainless Steel Rat book written by Harrison before his death. The Stainless Steel Rat is living high on the hog on the planet of Moolaplenty when a long-lost cousin and a ship full of swine arrive to drain his bank account and send him and Angelina on a journey to wander the stars.

The Adventures of the Stainless Steel Rat (1978) anthologized the first three books: ISBN 0-425-04378-9
The Stainless Steel Rat Omnibus (2008) anthologized the first three books: ISBN 978-0-575-08171-0 (Gollancz)

The series takes place in the far future, to the point where the name and location of the original homeworld of humankind has been lost. According to professor Coypu, the Gregorian calendar is no longer in use (with no mention of what replaced it), but The Stainless Steel Rat Saves the World provides a timeframe for the Rat's life and adventures when DiGriz is sent 32,598 years into the past and arrives in 1975 A.D., which would place the events of the series around the late 346th century.

== Spin-offs ==
=== Comics ===
The Stainless Steel Rat, The Stainless Steel Rat Saves the World and The Stainless Steel Rat for President were adapted into comic strip form in early issues of 2000 AD, written by Kelvin Gosnell and drawn by Carlos Ezquerra. Ezquerra drew Jim with an appearance modelled on the actor James Coburn. They appeared in the following issues of 2000 AD:

- The Stainless Steel Rat, 12 episodes, 2000 AD progs 140–151 (Nov. 1979 to Feb. 1980).
- The Stainless Steel Rat Saves the World, 12 episodes, 2000 AD progs 166–177 (June to Sep. 1980).
- The Stainless Steel Rat for President, 12 episodes, 2000 AD progs 393–404 (Nov. 1984 to Feb. 1985).

The first appearance of The Stainless Steel Rat in prog 140 was supposed to be preceded with a brief panel of explanation of who Jim was. However, an editorial error meant that the panel actually appeared at the end of the first episode, not the beginning. This prompted a letter to be printed in prog 148 from Harry Harrison himself pointing out the error, for which he won £3.

These three stories were colorized and reprinted by Eagle Comics in 1985 and 1986 as a six-issue limited series. They were also collected in a trade paperback in July 2010 (ISBN 1906735514).

The 2000 AD comic versions were collected into a paperback (ISBN 9781781088999) and hardcover edition in August 2021 which includes the color centre spreads as they originally appeared.

=== Books ===
==== Gamebook ====
Harrison also produced a gamebook in the style of the Choose Your Own Adventure and Fighting Fantasy series, called You Can Be the Stainless Steel Rat (ISBN 0-441-94978-9), the reader being told that their decisions would "determine whether he or she can find Prof. Geisteskrank on the planet Skraldespand (Note: "Geisteskrank" is colloquial German for insanity and "Skraldespand" is Danish for garbage can.) and bring him back before he activates a lethal new weapon". The reader generally cannot fail in this mission, regardless of his or her choices, although it is possible to get caught in an inescapable loop at one point.

==== Cameos ====
In the tribute anthology Foundation's Friends, Harrison wrote a story, The Fourth Law of Robotics, which featured the Stainless Steel Rat in the setting of Isaac Asimov's Robot series.

=== Board game ===
The Return of the Stainless Steel Rat, a board game inspired by the character, was published by SPI in their magazine Ares in the early 1980s. Designed by Greg Costikyan, the game involved the Rat infiltrating a space station under hostile control. The game was accompanied by a 6,000-word short story.

=== Video games ===
In 1984 a Stainless Steel Rat video game was developed by Mosaic Publishing for the ZX Spectrum, co-written by Harrison with programmer Sean O'Connell.

A text adventure game titled The Stainless Steel Rat Saves the World was released in 1984 for the Commodore 64.

== Characters ==
=== Angelina diGriz ===
Angelina diGriz is a criminal mastermind much like the Rat, only less ethical and more willing to kill. As the Rat's first case for the Special Corps, he tracks Angelina down and ends up falling in love with her. After her capture, she undergoes psycho surgery (not to be mistaken for "psychic surgery") to lessen her homicidal tendencies and she also joins the Corps; during that time she begins a relationship with the Rat that ends with them marrying in the last trimester of her pregnancy. She later assists on many of the Rat's adventures, often providing advice and solutions that Jim himself is unable to see. While she is no longer a heartless killer, her suppressed homicidal tendencies occasionally come out, especially when she sees another woman near her husband.

=== James and Bolivar diGriz ===
James and Bolivar diGriz are the twin sons of the Rat and Angelina. The Rat missed most of the first six years of their life because of his adventures in time (he briefly sees them as babies at the end of The Stainless Steel Rat's Revenge), but they share their father's attitudes and many of his skills. They end up marrying the same woman, who falls in love with both of them and gets herself duplicated into two identical women sharing one mind.

=== Harold Peters Inskipp ===
Harold Peters Inskipp is the director of the Special Corps and one of the most powerful men in the Galaxy. He recruits the Rat, but is frequently infuriated by his insubordinate attitude and tendency to go rogue – committing independent crimes for sheer enjoyment. The Special Corps is composed almost entirely of former criminals – Inskipp himself was a legendary fugitive known as "Inskipp the Uncatchable" before being recruited and eventually becoming the Corps's commander.

=== Professor Coypu ===
One of the few Special Corps members not taken from the criminal fraternity, Professor Coypu is a boffin who had developed a Time Helix device permitting time travel as well as a portal to alternate realities. He also has a great deal of general scientific knowledge, and sent a copy of his mind with the Rat on his excursion to the 20th century to enable Jim to build a time helix and return to his native time. The only descriptions given of Coypu are his prominent buck teeth - a trait he shares with his namesake, the coypu - and a large nose:

Inskipp proved he was made of sterner stuff than any rebellious physicist. He stepped forward briskly until he and Coypu were in eyeball-to-eyeball contact--or rather nose-to-nose contact since they both had impressive honkers.

— The Stainless Steel Rat Wants You

=== The Bishop ===
The Bishop was a master criminal on Bit O'Heaven, the Stainless Steel Rat's home planet. He was a lot less physical in his capers than Jim but undertook robberies, always leaving as his calling card a picture of the bishop chess piece. He retired from robbery before Jim was born, focusing instead on computer crime, and Jim only learned of his existence from a fellow prisoner while briefly in jail. Jim then contacted The Bishop by using his calling card in a robbery. As a result, The Bishop was forced out of retirement when he underestimated the police's computer security systems after running a check on Jim himself. The Bishop eventually became Jim's mentor and taught him a great deal about their trade, as well as a code of ethics. Eventually Jim and The Bishop had to leave Bit O'Heaven and on their first off-planet adventure The Bishop was killed. As a parting gift he left Jim a note that he signed with his real name, although the name is not revealed to the reader.

=== The Kekkonshiki ===
The Kekkonshiki, also known as "The Gray Men", are a human culture who initially prefer domination to coexistence. Their expertise lies in using technology to manipulate sentient minds, and they have manipulated both humans and aliens on a grand scale. Jim has experienced one of their techniques, in which the subject is convinced, via an implanted memory and faked surgical scars, that their hands were severed by an axe and then reattached while they were unconscious from the shock; he later becomes aware of their involvement in the alien invasion when he sees the same marks on the wrists of another prisoner. Jim has knowingly opposed them on two separate occasions (The Stainless Steel Rat's Revenge and The Stainless Steel Rat Wants You), but in the latter novel he is informed that he has in fact thwarted their plans twice already, making this their third encounter. (An alternate reading of the text is that finding and infiltrating their homeworld, in the second half of the novel, is counted separately from stopping the alien invasion in the first half.) They live on a harsh, icy world, which forced them to eliminate all emotion from their culture. This society is completely patriarchal, with women being treated as nothing more than property. During Jim's interactions with Hanasu - a disgraced Kekkonshiki council leader - he persuades them to reinterpret their teachings, and they embark on a more peaceful co-existence with the rest of humanity. ("Kekkonshiki" is the romanization of the Japanese word for "Marriage Ceremony" 結婚式. Also, while on their homeworld, Jim follows a technician into a room marked "Benjo", which turns out to be a toilet; "Benjo" is Japanese for water closet/toilet.)

== In popular culture ==
The MIT class ring, commonly referred to as "The Brass Rat", when cast in Celestrium (also known as jeweler's steel), is often referred to as "The Stainless Steel Rat".

The Chinese activist Liu Di, writing under the screen name "Stainless Steel Rat" (不锈钢老鼠), became a high-profile symbol for democracy and free speech in China since her detention in November 2002. Her screen name is often translated as Stainless Steel Mouse.

In The Librarians episode "And the Happily Ever Afters", Flynn Carsen refers to Ezekiel Jones, a thief, "master of technologies" as the "Stainless Steel Rat".

In Obsidian's The Outer Worlds a side quest is titled "The Stainless Steel Rat."

A character in Digital Extremes' Warframe refers to the exoskeleton-wearing player characters as "stainless steel rats."

== Reception ==
Galaxy reviewer Floyd C. Gale rated the first novel four stars out of five, saying "though pure entertainment, [it] underlines SF's role in providing speculative thought about potential problems."

The Stainless Steel Rat has been cited as Julian Assange's favourite novel, and having influenced the real-life outlaw Jim Clay "Ether" Harper VI.
