= John Munro (author) =

British engineer, professor and writer

- Born: 1849; Bristol
- Died: 19 December 1930; Bishopston, Bristol, England
- Occupations: Mechanical engineer, writer
- Notable work: A Trip to Venus, Heroes of the Telegraph

John Munro (1849-1930) was a British professor of mechanical engineering at Bristol and author who wrote the science fiction stories A Trip to Venus (1897), Sun-Rise in the Moon (1894) and A Message from Mars (1895). A Message from Mars was included as the first chapter of A Trip to Venus, and A Trip to Venus was included in Farewell, Fantastic Venus by Brian Aldiss and Harry Harrison. Munro also wrote Heroes of the Telegraph (1891) and other historical and reference books, such as A pocket-book of electrical rules and tables for the use of electricians and engineers (1884). Because they were published before 1925, most of Munro's works are in the public domain.

== Works ==
=== Science fiction ===
- A Trip to Venus, 1897
- A Message from Mars, in the March issue of Cassell's Magazine in 1895
- Sun-Rise in the Moon, in the October issue of Cassell's Magazine in 1894

=== Electricity and Technology ===
- Electricity and Its Uses, 1887
- The Wire and the Wave
- Pioneers of Electricity, 1890
- Heroes of the Telegraph, 1891
- The Story of Electricity, 1902
- Romance of Electricity, 1893
- A pocket-book of electrical rules and tables for the use of electricians and engineers by John Munro and Andrew Jamieson, 1894

=== Other ===
- The Story of the British race, 1909
- Lord Kelvin, G.C.V.O. (biography), 1902
