= Return to Eden (disambiguation) =

Return to Eden may refer to:

- Return to Eden, a 1983 Australian miniseries and subsequent 1986 weekly series
- Return to Eden (Timo Tolkki's Avalon album), 2019
- Return to Eden, Vol. 1: The Early Recordings, an album by All About Eve
- Return to Eden (novel) by Harry Harrison
- Return to Eden (game), the second game in the Silicon Dreams trilogy
- Return to Eden, a book by English author Rosalind Miles
