= Liu Di =

Chinese dissident (born 1981)

Liu Di (Traditional Chinese: 劉荻; Simplified Chinese: 刘荻; Pinyin: Liú Dí; born October 9, 1981), writing under the screen name "Stainless Steel Rat" (不锈钢老鼠), named after the assertive Harry Harrison science fiction character, became a symbol for democracy and free speech in China since her detention in November 2002. Her screen-name is often translated as Stainless Steel Mouse.

== Biography ==
Liu Di graduated as a psychology major from Beijing Normal University.

Liu's case comes during a crackdown on Internet content as the government struggles to gain control over a new and popular medium.

The reasons for Liu's detention were satirizing the CCP online and calling for the release of other "cyber-dissidents."

She was freed from Beijing's Qincheng prison on Friday, November 28, 2003. Two other "cyber-dissidents", Wu Yiran, and Li Yibin, were also freed from a jail for political detainees.

== See also ==
- List of Chinese dissidents
- International Freedom of Expression Exchange monitors Internet censorship in China
