= To the Stars (trilogy) =

Series of science fiction novels by Harry Harrison

First Omnibus edition (publ. Nelson Doubleday)

The To the Stars trilogy is a series of science fiction novels by Harry Harrison, first published in 1980 (Homeworld) and 1981 (Wheelworld and Starworld). The three books were re-published in an omnibus edition in 1981.

== Homeworld ==
Homeworld presents a dystopian world some centuries in the future; in response to overpopulation, depletion of the world's natural resources and resulting social and environmental collapse, a ruthless totalitarian oligarchy has emerged. The population is decreased and a surveillance state is set up which rules over both Earth and the interstellar colonies that have been established.

The novel introduces the protagonist of the series, Jan Kulozik, a young electronic engineer and member of his society's privileged technocratic elite, and traces his disillusionment and eventual rebellion as he discovers the true nature of his society.

The population of Britain is divided into a small, highly educated elite class and the proles, who do lower-skilled jobs or receive unemployment payments, with all proles living in poverty. Only a tenth of the proles have jobs, while the upper-class lives well, with servants and access to luxury foods. Even though the society has advanced computers, satellites, fusion energy that provides low-cost electricity, faster than light travel, and space colonies, the proles' elevators are not fixed and they are given little medical care.

On a vacation, his yacht is hit by other boats, and he is about to drown, but an Israeli spy submarine rescues him. He meets Sara, a beautiful young Israeli spy, who tells him about Israel. Her account of Israel's status is at odds with what the British totalitarian government teaches its citizens. Jan starts to question his role as a member of the privileged elite and he joins the Israeli resistance in England. While working with the resistance, he becomes aware of the dreary, impoverished lives of the proles, and he learns that the British government has trackers in cars and electronic listening devices concealed in private dwellings and public areas.

== Wheelworld ==
In Wheelworld Jan Kulozik has been exiled to the agricultural colony world Halvmörk in the Beta Aurigae system. Kulozik must lead the colonists on a hazardous journey across the planet after the re-supply ships from Earth fail to appear on schedule, while coping with the suspicions and maneuverings of Halvmörk's oligarchic rulers.

Halvmörk is the third planet of Beta Aurigae. Like many names in Harrison's work, Halvmörk is taken from a European language, here Swedish. It literally means "half-dark". This may be related to the fact that due to extreme temperature differences human life is possible only in a small twilight zone round the wintry pole.

Halvmörk's orbiting period (year) is a little over eight Earth years. Its orbit is extremely elliptic, and the inclination of its axis is 41°, so seasonal changes have an enormous effect on the weather. The rotational axis is inclined in the direction of the small axis of the orbit, so the periastron and the apastron coincide with the equinoxes.

As a result, the twilight zone remains largely constant for most of the year, when the planet is far from its sun. During this time a colony of humans grows grain in the twilight zone. When the planet approaches its periastron or its apastron the colony migrates to the other pole, using enormous insulated trucks and the planet's sole road, built especially to be used once in four years.

The novel does not seem to take into account that due to the ellipticity of the orbit the planet would be in a near-equinox position during most of the orbiting period, which would mean that both poles would enjoy a mild twilight. If the orbit were less elliptic there would be no arctic twilight zone at all but polar nights and days of varying length, like on Earth. So it is hard to imagine the astronomic circumstances needed for Harrison's interesting plot.

== Starworld ==
In Starworld, the final novel in the trilogy, an interstellar rebellion has overthrown the Earth Empire's control over the interstellar colonies. Kulozik returns to Earth from exile to attempt to spread the revolution to the mother planet itself.

== Reception ==
Greg Costikyan reviewed Homeworld, Wheelworld, and Starworld in Ares Magazine #10 and commented that "Harrison is incapable of writing a bad novel, and To the Stars is a fairly enjoyable way to kill some time."
