= Planet of the Damned =

1962 novel by Harry Harrison

- Cover of the first edition, published by Bantam Books.
- Author: Harry Harrison
- Language: English
- Publisher: Bantam Books
- Publication date: 1962

Planet of the Damned is a 1962 science fiction novel by American writer Harry Harrison. It was serialised in 1961 under the title Sense of Obligation and published under that name in 1967. It was nominated for the Hugo Award.

== Plot ==
Planet of the Damned follows Brion Brandd, a character who lives on the planet Anvhar, which, due to an extremely elliptical orbit, experiences a year with a long cold winter and a short hot summer, to which the population have become adapted. To avoid social problems during the winter period, Anvhar has initiated a planet-wide series of mental and physical games called the Twenties. The novel starts with Brandd winning the Twenties. As he recovers from the games, Brandd meets Ihjel, a previous winner of the Twenties, who manages to convince him to join a mission on the desert planet of Dis. The ruling class of Dis, the magter, have threatened to transport cobalt bombs onto the neighbouring planet Nyjord if they refuse to surrender. As a result, the planet is being blockaded and under threat of a pre-emptive nuclear strike. Ihjel fears that this seemingly inevitable genocide, if not avoided, will render the peaceful civilization of Nyjord dysfunctional, also.

In the novel, Brandd travels to Dis with Ihjel and a scientist from Earth called Lea, but on arrival the trio are attacked and Ihjel is killed. After encounters with the local population and other humans, Brandd starts to put together the reason for the magter's seemingly suicidal aggression. Brandd learns that most life on Dis survives the extremes of the planet by using symbiosis. The magter, though, have been infected by a parasite that destroys the higher functions of their brains. Eventually Brandd locates the cobalt bombs and disables the transmission mechanism, allowing him to return home.
