= Farewell, Fantastic Venus =

Cover of the first edition.

Farewell, Fantastic Venus is a 1968 American science fiction anthology edited by Brian Aldiss and Harry Harrison. An abridged version was published in the same year under the title All About Venus. It was first published as a direct response to the information returned from the first space probes sent to Venus, especially the first atmospheric probe to return data, Venera 4. The first data was not returned from the surface until Venera 7 successfully landed in 1970.

The book contains stories and novel excerpts of Venus in fiction from the time before its true nature became apparent, when the clouded planet could still be imagined as another Earth, albeit a hotter one. From that point on, few stories would be written which did not recognize Venus as a dry lifeless world with acid clouds and a temperature high enough to melt lead. Writers such as Larry Niven (author of "Becalmed in Hell") did write about the "new" Venus, but there were to be few more transplanted jungle adventures, imagined world of oceans with monsters, or Venusians. Venus had been the best hope for extraterrestrial life, and now that hope was lost.

Later, however, writers avoided this apparent impasse through using hard science fiction premises for future terraforming of Venus, or resorted to alternate world science fiction, where Venus had either been terraformed by aliens in the distant past to provide an Earth-like biosphere, or had undergone different processes of planetary formation to arrive at an inhabitable alternative. Alternatively, science fantasy authors deliberately overlooked recent discoveries in favor of a setting they loved.

The authors whose stories were included ranged from C.S. Lewis (excerpt from Perelandra) to Edgar Rice Burroughs (excerpt from Pirates of Venus) and from Olaf Stapledon (excerpt from Last and First Men) to Poul Anderson ("The Big Rain", "Sister Planet"). Essay and meditation from a variety of scientists and science fiction writers were also included in the collection.

== Contents ==
Texts in the book include:

=== Short fiction ===
- "A City on Venus" (1941) by Henry Gade
- "Alchemy" (1950) by John and Dorothy de Courcy
- "The Big Rain" (1954) by Poul Anderson
- "Sister Planet" (1959) by Poul Anderson
- "Before Eden" (1961) by Arthur C. Clarke

=== Excerpts from longer fiction ===
- A Trip to Venus (1897) by John Munro
- A Honeymoon in Space (1900) by George Griffith
- Last and First Men (1930) by Olaf Stapledon
- Pirates of Venus (1932) by Edgar Rice Burroughs
- Perelandra (1943) by C. S. Lewis
- Escape to Venus (1956) by S. Makepeace Lott

=== Essays ===
- The Story of the Heavens (1882) by Sir Robert Ball
- The Destinies of the Stars (1917) by Svante Arrhenius
- The Man from Venus (1939) by Frank R. Paul
- Unveiling the Mystery Planet (1955) by Willy Ley
- Exploring the Planets (1964) by V. A. Firsoff
- Intelligent Life in the Universe (1966) by Carl Sagan
- Some Mysteries of Venus Resolved (1967) by Sir Bernard Lovell
- Dream of Distance (1967)
- Venus Mystery for Scientists (1967) by John Davy
- Scientist Says Icecaps on Venus Would Make Life Possible (1968) by Evert Clark
- Foreword / Clouded Judgements / Never-Fading Flowers / Swamp and Sand / "Venus is Hell!" / Big Sister / The Open Question (all 1968) essays by Brian W. Aldiss
