= Two Tales and Eight Tomorrows =

First edition

Two Tales and Eight Tomorrows is a collection of science fiction stories by American writer Harry Harrison between 1958 and 1965. It was published in 1965 by Victor Gollancz Ltd.

== Contents ==
The collection includes:

- Introduction by Brian Aldiss
- "The Streets of Ashkelon"
- "Portrait of the Artist"
- "Rescue Operation"
- "Captain Bedlam"
- "Final Encounter"
- "Unto My Manifold Dooms"
- "The Pliable Animal"
- "Captain Honario Harpplayer, R.N."
- "According to His Abilities"
- "I Always Do What Teddy Says"

== Reception ==
Dave Pringle reviewed Two Tales and Eight Tomorrows for Imagine magazine, and stated that "These early stories are mostly light and bright, although 'The Streets of Ashkelon' is a memorable alien melodrama on a religious theme."

== Reviews ==
- Review by W. T. Webb (1965) in Vector 34
- Review by Nik Morton (1984) in Paperback Inferno, Volume 7, Number 4
- Review by Andy Sawyer (1987) in Paperback Inferno, #66
