= Leon Stover =

American anthropologist (1929–2006)

- Born: Leon Eugene Stover; April 9, 1929; Lewistown, Pennsylvania, U.S.
- Died: November 25, 2006 (aged 77); Chicago, Illinois, U.S.
- Education: Western Maryland College; Columbia University (MA, PhD)
- Occupations: Anthropologist; sinologist
- Spouse(s): Patricia Ruth McLaren; Takeko Kawai Stover
- Children: Laren Stover

Leon Eugene Stover (April 9, 1929 – November 25, 2006) was an American anthropologist, a Sinologist, and a science fiction fan, who wrote both fiction and nonfiction. He was a scholar of the works of H. G. Wells and Robert A. Heinlein and an occasional collaborator with Harry Harrison.

== Scholarly career ==
Stover did his undergraduate studies at Western Maryland College, and received his M.A. in 1952 and his Ph.D. in 1963 from Columbia University. His masters' thesis was The Chinese peasant family and communism; his dissertation, "Face" and verbal analogues of interaction in Chinese culture: a theory of formalized social behavior based upon participant-observation of an upper-class Chinese household, together with a biographical study of the primary informant. He was an instructor at the American Museum of Natural History in New York City from 1955 to 1957, and assistant professor at Hobart and William Smith Colleges in Geneva, New York from 1957 to 1963. He was visiting assistant professor at the University of Tokyo from 1963 to 1965 before being invited to serve as a professor of anthropology at the Illinois Institute of Technology where he taught from 1965 to 1995. In 1995 he became professor emeritus. It was a mention in Stover's unpublished biography of Heinlein (he had originally been authorized to write a definitive Heinlein biography, but later had a falling-out with Heinlein's widow) that led researcher Robert James to discover the hitherto-unpublished Heinlein novel For Us, The Living: A Comedy of Customs.

== Books ==
=== Non-fiction ===
- Above The Human Landscape. An Anthology Of Social Science Fiction; Willis E. McNelly and Leon E. Stover, eds. (1972)
- La Science-Fiction Américaine: Essai d'Anthropologie Culturelle (1972)
- The Cultural Ecology of Chinese Civilization: Peasants and Elites in the Last of the Agrarian States (1974)
- China: An Anthropological Perspective; Leon E. and Takeko K. Stover (1976)
- Stonehenge: The Indo-European Heritage; Leon E. Stover and Bruce Kraig (1978)
- Robert A. Heinlein (1987)
- The Prophetic Soul: A Reading of H.G. Wells's Things to Come, Together with His Film Treatment, Whither mankind? and the Postproduction Script (Both Never Before Published) (1987)
- Harry Harrison (1990)
- Science Fiction from Wells to Heinlein (2002)
- Stonehenge City: A Reconstruction (2003)
- Imperial China and the State Cult of Confucius (2005)

=== Fiction ===
- Apeman, Spaceman: Anthropological Science Fiction; Leon E. Stover and Harry Harrison, eds. (1968)
- The Shaving of Karl Marx : An Instant Novel of Ideas, After the Manner of Thomas Love Peacock, in Which Lenin and H.G. Wells Talk About the Political Meaning of the Scientific Romances (1982)
- Stonehenge: Where Atlantis Died; Leon E. Stover and Harry Harrison (1983)
- Island of Doctor Moreau: A Critical Text of the 1896 London First Edition, With an Introduction and Appendices; H.G. Wells; Leon E. Stover, ed. (1996)
- The Time Machine: An Invention: A Critical Text of the 1895 London First Edition, with an Introduction and Appendices; H.G. Wells; Leon E. Stover, ed. (1996)
- The First Men in the Moon: A Critical Text of the 1901 London First Edition, with an Introduction and Appendices; H.G. Wells; Leon E. Stover, ed. (1998)
- The Invisible Man: A Grotesque Romance: A Critical Text of the 1897 New York First Edition, with an Introduction and Appendices; H.G. Wells; Leon E. Stover, ed. (1998)
- When the Sleeper Wakes: A Critical Text of the 1899 New York and London First Edition, with an Introduction and Appendices; H.G. Wells; Leon E. Stover, ed. (1999)
- The War of the Worlds: A Critical Text of the 1898 London First Edition; H.G. Wells; Leon E. Stover, ed. (2001)
- The Sea Lady: A Tissue of Moonshine; H.G. Wells; Leon E. Stover, ed. (2001)
- Man Who Could Work Miracles: A Critical Text of the 1936 New York First Edition, with an Introduction and Appendices; H.G. Wells; Leon E. Stover, ed. (2002)
- Things to Come: A Critical Text of the 1935 London First Edition, With an Introduction and Appendices; H.G.Wells; Leon E. Stover, ed. (2007)

== Personal life ==
Stover was born in Lewistown, Pennsylvania on April 9, 1929. He was of American-German background whose family was related to the Eisenhower family. He married Patricia Ruth McLaren, whom he met in drama class at Western Maryland College; they had one daughter, author Laren Stover. His second wife was Takeko Kawai Stover whom he married shortly after completing his dissertation at Columbia University. They collaborated on many books together. He died of complications from diabetes at his home in Chicago on November 25, 2006.
