= A Stainless Steel Rat is Born =

1985 novel by Harry Harrison

A Stainless Steel Rat is Born is a novel by Harry Harrison published in 1985, the first by in-series chronology in the Stainless Steel Rat series.

== Plot summary ==
A Stainless Steel Rat is Born is a novel in which the young Slippery Jim DiGriz finds himself getting into jail and back out again seeking criminal contacts.

== Reception ==
Dave Langford reviewed A Stainless Steel Rat is Born for White Dwarf #77, and stated that "No sequel will match the saga's first book, but this comes close: Jim's family isn't around to get in his light, the action doesn't get so excessively silly or grim as to fragment the story, and it climaxes on one of those ghastly low-tech planets in which Harrison delights."

== Reviews ==
- Review by Don D'Ammassa (1986) in Science Fiction Chronicle, #77 February 1986
- Review by Tom Easton (1986) in Analog Science Fiction/Science Fact, February 1986
