= Apeman, Spaceman =

Anthology of science fiction stories

- cover of first edition
- Editor: Harry Harrison, Leon E. Stover
- Cover artist: Donald Crews, Ann Crews
- Language: English
- Genre: Science fiction
- Publisher: Doubleday
- Publication date: 1968
- Publication place: United States
- Media type: Print (hardcover)
- Pages: 355
- OCLC: 00438247
- Dewey Decimal: 808.83 S889a
- LC Class: PZ1.S8932

Apeman, Spaceman: Anthropological Science Fiction is an anthology of science fiction short stories edited by Harry Harrison and Leon E. Stover. It was first published in hardcover by Doubleday in June 1968, with a paperback edition following from Berkley Medallion in March 1970. The first British editions were issued in hardcover by Rapp & Whiting in October 1968 and in paperback by Penguin Books in November 1972 (reprinted in 1979). The book has been translated into German.

The book collects eighteen short stories and novelettes by various science fiction authors, interspersed with a foreword, introduction, poems and essays by the editors and others. The stories were previously published from 1893-1966 in various science fiction and other magazines.

== Contents ==
- "Foreword" (Carleton S. Coon)
- "Introduction" (Harry Harrison and Leon E. Stover)
- "Fossils" [essay] (Harry Harrison and Leon E. Stover)
- "Neanderthal" [poem] (Marijane Allen)
- "Throwback" (L. Sprague de Camp)
- "The Hairless Ape" [essay] (Harry Harrison and Leon E. Stover)
- "Apology for Man's Physique" [essay] (Earnest A. Hooton)
- "The Renegade" (Marion Henry)
- "Dominant Species" [essay] (Harry Harrison and Leon E. Stover)
- "Eltonian Pyramid" [essay] (Ralph W. Dexter)
- "Goldfish Bowl" (Anson MacDonald)
- "The Second-Class Citizen" (Damon Knight)
- "Culture" (Jerry Shelton)
- "Unfinished Evolution" [essay] (Harry Harrison and Leon E. Stover)
- "The Man of the Year Million" (H. G. Wells)
- "1,000,000 A.D." [poem] (Anonymous)
- " In the Beginning" (Morton Klass)
- "The Future of the Races of Man" [essay] (Carleton S. Coon)
- "Prehistory" [essay] (Harry Harrison and Leon E. Stover)
- "The Evolution Man" (Roy Lewis)
- "The Kon-Tiki Myth" [essay] (Robert C. Suggs)
- "A Medal for Horatius" (Brig. Gen. William C. Hall)
- "Archaeology" [essay] (Harry Harrison and Leon E. Stover)
- "Omnilingual" (H. Beam Piper)
- "For Those Who Follow After" (Dean McLaughlin)
- "A Preliminary Investigation of an Early Man Site in the Delaware River Valley" (Timothy J. O'Leary and Charles W. Ward)
- "Local Customs" [essay] (Harry Harrison and Leon E. Stover)
- "Body Ritual Among the Nacirema" (Horace M. Miner)
- "The Wait" (Kit Reed)
- "Everybodyovskyism in Cat City" (Lao Shaw)
- "The Nine Billion Names of God" (Arthur C. Clarke)
- "Applied Anthropology" [essay] (Harry Harrison and Leon E. Stover)
- "The Captives" (Julian Chain)
- "Men in Space" [essay] (Harold D. Lasswell)
- "Of Course" (Chad Oliver)
- "Afterword" (Leon E. Stover)
- "References Cited"

== Reception ==
Publishers Weekly called the anthology "[a]n ambitious, and for the most part rewarding, melange of science fiction, anthropology, and nonfiction about the future" featuring both "tried and true stalwarts" like Clarke, Oliver, Heinlein, Knight, and Del Rey, and "other lesser known writers." Hall's and Suggs's contributions are singled out for particular comment, the former as "one of the most devastating and original satires on Army red tape through the ages we have ever read," and the latter as "both good anthropology and interesting at the same time, no mean achievement." The book is summed up as "[i]n the main, a thoughtfully conceived assortment."

Kirkus Reviews considered the book "a handy and stimulating anthology for the student who might wonder whether what would happen if Pithecanthropus were still around—as a football player for instance. The stories are top notch, from Arthur C. Clarke's Nine Billion Names of God to Peanuts. What if a galactic survey team picked an Eskimo as representative of Earth's highest form of civilization; if dolphins had to train man to survive in their world after the holocaust; if there were a lost tribe of Neanderthals somewhere? Mr. Stover contributes an entertaining lesson at the end to demonstrate where authors went both right and wrong and the book should become a teacher's pet in this science."

The anthology was also reviewed by Yole G. Sills in American Anthropologist v. 71, no. 4, 1969, pp. 798–799.

The anthology was also reviewed by Charlie Brown in Locus no. 55, June 3, 1970, and P. Schuyler Miller in Analog Science Fiction/Science Fact, November 1971 .
