= Laren Stover =

American writer

- Occupation: Writer
- Parent(s): Leon Stover; Patricia Ruth McLaren
- Writing career
- Notable awards: Dana Award (2001)

Laren Stover is an American writer. She is the author of Pluto, Animal Lover (HarperCollins), The Bombshell Manual of Style illustrated by Ruben Toledo (Hyperion, 2001) and Bohemian Manifesto: A Field Guide to Living on the Edge (Bulfinch, 2004). She won the Dana Award for the short story in 2001. She is the daughter of author Leon Stover.
