= Winter in Eden =

1986 novel by Harry Harrison

- First U.K. ed.
- Author: Harry Harrison
- Cover artist: Gino D'Achille
- Language: English
- Series: West of Eden
- Release number: 2
- Genre: Science fiction, Alternate history
- Publisher: Grafton, Bantam Books
- Publication date: September 1986
- Publication place: United Kingdom
- Media type: Print (Hardcover)
- Pages: 486
- ISBN: 0-246-12612-4 (U.K); 0-553-05163-6 (U.S.)
- OCLC: 13861118
- Dewey Decimal: 813.5/4
- LC Class: PS3568.O243
- Preceded by: West of Eden
- Followed by: Return to Eden

Winter in Eden is a 1986 science fiction novel by American author Harry Harrison, the second in the Eden series.

It tells an alternate history of planet Earth in which the extinction of the dinosaurs never occurred. The story began in West of Eden, which depicts a war between a group of Cro-Magnon-level humans that evolved from New World monkeys and a reptilian race called the Yilanè, who are descended from the prehistoric mosasaur and have become the dominant lifeform on the planet. The central characters from the first book return: Vaintè, an ambitious Yilanè, and Kerrick, a "ustuzou" (the Yilanè word for mammal) who was captured by the Yilanè as a boy, raised as a Yilanè, and eventually escapes to rejoin his own people and burn the Yilanè colony city.

The series concludes with Return to Eden.

== Plot ==
In Winter in Eden, Kerrick and Herilak (fellow chieftain) search the burned Alpèsak and discovers two Yilanè males. Herilak and Armun (wife of Kerrick) go north, while Kerrick stays in the city to learn more about the Yilanè. The reptiloids use their mastery of biology to drive them off and reconquer the city. Meanwhile, Enge, her fellows and an old, grumpy scientist establishes a city in South America. Vaintè allies Lanefenuu, leader of another city. Together they attempt to eradicate humans. After several unsuccessful attempts, they corner Herilak and the tribes in a valley. Kerrick and Armun try to find each other and finally end up with the Paramutan (northern whale hunter humanoids). They return and find a safe haven at a small lake with their own child, some humans and the two Yilanè males. Later, Kerrick and Armun travel to the Paramutan again, and with their help Kerrick manages to blackmail Lanefenuu to withdraw Vaintè and make peace. Vaintè initially obeys, but later defies efforts to make peace with the humans, so Lanefenuu banishes her.

== Reception ==
Dave Langford reviewed Winter in Eden for White Dwarf #99, and stated that " These are tricks and turns of mere short-story weight, while the epic potential lies elsewhere: with the long-term inevitability of either human/dinosaur coexistence or one species' extinction, with the advancing glaciers that can't be conveniently bluffed or set fire to."

== Reviews ==
- Review by Arthur O. Lewis (1986) in Fantasy Review, October 1986
- Review by Mark Greener (1986) in Vector 135
- Review by C. J. Henderson [as by Chris Henderson] (1987) in Starlog, February 1987
- Review by Everett F. Bleiler [as by E. F. Bleiler] (1987) in Rod Serling's The Twilight Zone Magazine, February 1987
- Review by Thomas A. Easton [as by Tom Easton] (1987) in Analog Science Fiction/Science Fact, March 1987
- Review by Don D'Ammassa (1987) in Science Fiction Chronicle, #95 August 1987
- Review by Phil Nichols (1988) in Paperback Inferno, #70
- Review [German] by Christian Hoffmann (2018) in phantastisch!, #72
