= Bill, the Galactic Hero =

1965 novel by Harry Harrison

- Cover of the first edition.
- Author: Harry Harrison
- Cover artist: Larry Lurin
- Language: English
- Genre: Science fiction
- Publisher: Doubleday
- Publication date: 1965
- Media type: Print
- Pages: 185
- OCLC: 55999461
- Followed by: The Planet of the Robot Slaves

Bill, the Galactic Hero is a satirical science fiction novel by American writer Harry Harrison, first published in 1965. A novella length version appeared in the magazine Galaxy Science Fiction in 1964 under the name "The Starsloggers". It was written as a response to Robert Heinlein's Starship Troopers.

Harrison reports having been approached by a Vietnam veteran who described Bill as "the only book that's true about the military". Terry Pratchett once said: "I don't think The Hitchhiker's Guide to the Galaxy was the funniest Science Fiction novel ever written. The funniest Science Fiction novel ever written was Bill, The Galactic Hero".

== Plot summary ==
Bill is a farmboy on a small backward agricultural planet who is drugged, hypnotised, then shanghaied into the Space Troopers and sent to recruit training under a fanged instructor named Deathwish Drang. After surviving boot camp, he is transferred to active duty as a fuse tender on the flagship of the space fleet in battle with the Chingers, a small reptilian race who are, in Trooper propaganda, portrayed as being 7 feet tall. Before the battle one of Bill's fellow troopers, known as Eager Beager, is revealed to be an android operated from within by a Chinger, who is in fact only 7 inches tall. Injured and with the fleet almost destroyed, Bill accidentally fires off a shot from his ship's main gun. The shot is witnessed by an officer and Bill is proclaimed a hero.

As a reward he is sent to the city-planet Helior to receive a medal from the emperor. Bill's city plan is stolen from him on a sightseeing tour. Losing his plan is a crime, and without his plan it takes him days to get back to the Trooper Transit Center. When he arrives he finds he is AWOL for missing his transport, and is threatened with arrest and torture. He escapes and flees into the depths of the city, where he first falls in with a gang of similarly "deplanned" outlaws, then finds employment with Helior's garbage disposal service, cannily using the galactic postal service to send garbage to other planets, since Helior has run out of room for it. His unwilling recruitment as a spy to infiltrate an ineptly-run anarchist plot leads to his arrest. He has been AWOL for so long that now he is considered a deserter. He avoids being shot by a firing squad thanks to a wily lawyer, who points out that technically the entire city, and therefore the entire planet, is under military rule and is a military base, so he never actually went AWOL. However, he is convicted of sleeping on duty.

He is sent to a prison unit working on a planet where the Human–Chinger war continues. Escaping during an attack, he rescues some prisoners and meets a dying Deathwish Drang. He then shoots off his own foot to get off-planet.

The book ends with the story coming full circle as Bill, with an artificial foot and Deathwish Drang's fangs, returns to his home planet and recruits more gullible young men, including his own younger brother, into the Troopers, even after his mother begs him to be merciful. Bill ignores his mother's pleas because a recruiter's term of service is reduced for each new trooper they enlist.

== Series ==
Six sequels were published, from 1989 to 1992:

- The first, Bill, the Galactic Hero on the Planet of Robot Slaves (1989), is by Harry Harrison.

After this, the sequels were penned by other writers and edited by Harrison. Harry Harrison expressed his own disappointment in the series in an interview with Brian Ireland, quoted on Ireland On-Line:

They have a thing in the States called 'share cropping' where you have a series or character, and you have other writers do work with it [...] I never wanted to do it, I'm not interested. But one of the packagers said, coming back to this thing I said about the pornography of violence: Harry, why don't we do a Bill, the Galactic Hero series and actually do some anti-war propaganda instead of all pro war. So they eventually talked me into it. The second one – Bill, the Galactic Hero on the Planet of Robot Slaves – I did myself, that was a lot of fun. If they could all be like that. But no, no. We all make mistakes. I'm a professional writer. I earn a living at it. These are the only ones where I did it wrong.

- The second, Bill, the Galactic Hero on the Planet of Bottled Brains (1990), is by Robert Sheckley and Harry Harrison.
- The third, Bill, the Galactic Hero on the Planet of Tasteless Pleasure (1991), is by David Bischoff and Harry Harrison.
- The fourth, Bill, the Galactic Hero on the Planet of Zombie Vampires (1991), is by Jack C. Haldeman and Harry Harrison.
- The fifth, Bill, the Galactic Hero on the Planet of Ten Thousand Bars (1991), is by David Bischoff and Harry Harrison (was also published under the title: "Bill, the Galactic Hero on the Planet of the Hippies from Hell").
- The sixth, Bill, the Galactic Hero: The Final Incoherent Adventure (1991), is by David Harris and Harry Harrison.

"Bill, the Galactic Hero's Happy Holiday" appeared as a short story in Galactic Dreams (1994) by Harry Harrison.

== Plot elements ==
=== Bloater Drive ===
The standard ways of circumventing relativity in 1950s and 1960s science fiction were hyperspace, subspace and spacewarp. Harrison's contribution was the "Bloater Drive". This enlarges the gaps between the atoms of the ship until it spans the distance to the destination, whereupon the atoms are moved back together again, reconstituting the ship at its previous size but in the new location. An occasional side-effect is that the occupants see a planet drifting, in miniature, through the hull.

=== Bowb ===
Harrison introduced a new euphemism, "bowb", in the series to cover the vulgarity necessary to render military life accurately. It is used extensively in Bill, the Galactic Hero.

== Adaptations ==
Topps Comics produced a three-issue adaptation of the first volume in 1994.

Before his death in 2012, Harrison gave filmmaker Alex Cox an "academic license" to make a student film version of the novel with his students at the University of Colorado at Boulder, which Cox and the students completed and released in 2014.
