= The Streets of Ashkelon =

Short story by Harry Harrison

- Short story by Harry Harrison
- Country: United States
- Language: English
- Genre: Science fiction

Publication
- Published in: New Worlds #122
- Publication type: Periodical
- Publisher: Maclaren & Sons
- Media type: Print
- Publication date: September 1962

"The Streets of Ashkelon" is a science fiction short story by American writer Harry Harrison. It has also been published under the title "An Alien Agony". It was first published in 1962, in Brian Aldiss's New Worlds #122. The story has since been reprinted over 30 times in fourteen languages, in anthologies and also in academic textbooks. Science fiction critic Paul Tomlinson, who helps run Harrison's official website, has estimated that it is Harrison's most widely published story.

Its name is a reference to a passage from the Biblical 2 Samuel 1:20, which says "proclaim it not in the streets of Ashkelon".

Harrison wrote the story for a Judith Merril-edited anthology that was to contain original stories that all violated societal taboos in some way: Streets portrayed a heroic atheist, and a naive, foolish missionary. When Merrill's project fell through, Harrison approached other markets; however, no American publisher accepted it, and so Harrison approached British markets instead. Streets was not published by an American company until six years later.

== Plot ==
An atheist merchant/trader, John Garth, is the only human on an alien planet where the native Weskers, intelligent but painstakingly literal-minded amphibians, live in what seem to be utopian conditions. These Weskers have no concept whatsoever of gods, religion, or sin. Garth has been gradually teaching them the scientific method.

One day Garth is surprised by the arrival of Father Mark, a missionary who is intent on proselytizing to the natives. Despite Garth's best efforts to dissuade him, even at gunpoint, the missionary is intent on "saving souls".

Weeks pass and Father Mark has been instructing the Weskers in catechism in their newly-constructed church, and he has recently finished teaching the Weskers about the Crucifixion and Resurrection of Christ. Soon afterwards, Itin, the ostensible leader of the Weskers, approaches Garth about the problem of reconciling the empirical truth of the scientific method with the symbolic truth of revealed religion and asks him to come to the church to debate Father Mark. Once at the church, Garth, who had previously made preparations to leave the planet, sees the Bible open to an illustration and orders the missionary to come with him. Not understanding what's wrong, Father Mark refuses; but before Garth can explain, several natives seize the priest and drag him to a hill upon which is planted a cross. In accordance with what Garth taught them about the scientific method, they are experimentally testing the hypothesis that if they crucify the missionary in accordance with what he taught them about the Gospels, he will miraculously rise from the dead three days later and thereby redeem them.

Three days later, after Father Mark has been buried and the hypothesis disproved, Itin asks Garth what went wrong, and arrives at a simple truth: that the Weskers are now murderers.

== Critical response ==
Paul Di Filippo considers "The Streets of Ashkelon" to be a response to James Blish's "A Case of Conscience".

Paul Cook describes "The Streets of Ashkelon" as "bitterly ironic" and "one of the saddest science fiction stories ever written", saying that it "gives credence (of a kind) to the spirit of the Prime Directive".
