= 50 in 50 =

2001 collection of short stories by Harry Harrison

50 in 50: A collection of short stories, one for each of fifty years.
- First edition
- Author: Harry Harrison
- Cover artist: Vincent Di Fate
- Language: English
- Genre: Science fiction
- Published: 2001 (Tor Books)
- Publication place: United States
- Media type: Print
- Pages: 624
- ISBN: 978-0-312-87789-7
- OCLC: 316247668
- Dewey Decimal: 813.54
- LC Class: PS3558.A667 A6

See also 50 goals in 50 games.

50 in 50: A collection of short stories, one for each of fifty years is a 2001 short story collection by American author Harry Harrison. It contains one story for each of Harrison's 50 years of professional authorship as of publication.

The contents are divided into sections grouped by theme or concept, except for the final section of eleven stories that defy easy categorization.

- "Alien Shores"
- "Make Room! Make Room!"
- "Miraculous Inventions"
- "Laugh—I Thought I Would Cry"
- "Other Worlds"
- "R.U.R."
- "One for the Shrinks"
- "The Light Fantastic"
- "Square Pegs in Round Holes"

== Sources ==
- Harrison, Harry. (2001). 50 in 50: A collection of short stories, one for each of fifty years. New York: TOR Books. ISBN 978-0-312-87789-7; OCLC 316247668
