= Deathworld =

Novel series by Harry Harrison

First omnibus edition (1968), published by Nelson Doubleday, cover art by Richard Corben.

Deathworld is the name of a series of science fiction novels by American writer Harry Harrison, including the books Deathworld (first published 1960, serialized in Astounding Science Fiction), Deathworld 2 (1964, initially titled The Ethical Engineer and serialized in Analog) and Deathworld 3 (1968, serialized in Analog as The Horse Barbarians), plus the short story "The Mothballed Spaceship" (1973, written as part of a tribute to John W. Campbell). The central hero is a gambler who becomes involved with colonists of an extremely hostile planet.

== Synopsis ==
Deathworld centers on Jason dinAlt, a professional gambler who uses his erratic psionic abilities to tip the odds in his favor. While visiting the planet Cassylia, he is challenged by a man named Kerk Pyrrus (an ambassador of the planet Pyrrus) to turn a large amount of money into an immense sum by gambling at a government-run casino. He succeeds and survives the planetary government's desperate efforts to take back the money. Bothered that he may finally have met someone superior to him, he decides to accompany Kerk to Pyrrus, despite being warned that it is the deadliest world ever colonized by humans.

There have been numerous supernovae in the region, meaning that planets in the area are rich in valuable radioactive ores, but Pyrrus is the only even marginally habitable one, and thus the only one that can support sustained mining operations. Pyrrus is no paradise. It has a gravity of 2 g; its 42° axial tilt creates severe weather; it has frequent earthquakes and volcanic eruptions; two large moons generate tides of up to 30 meters; and finally, there are high levels of radiation.

Everything on the planet is deadly to humans. The large animals are strong enough to destroy small vehicles, while the small ones have neurotoxic venom. Even the plants are deadly. All microorganisms consume insufficiently protected tissue as quickly as acids. On top of all this, life evolves so quickly that even Kerk and his Pyrran crew have to be retrained upon their return in order to survive.

Because of this harsh environment, the settlers are engaged in a ceaseless struggle to survive, which – despite generations of acclimation and a training regime harsher than that of ancient Spartans – they are losing. The money Jason won is used to buy desperately needed weapons.

While acclimating to the harsh planet, Jason turns his attentions toward solving the planet's mysteries and saving the faltering colony. The few surviving historical records show Jason that the settlers' numbers have dwindled since the planet was first colonized, and they are now restricted to a single settlement. Extrapolating backward, it is clear to Jason that the flora and fauna were once far less hostile to humans. Jason also learns of greatly despised "grubbers", humans living outside the city, with whom the Pyrrans grudgingly trade hardware for increasingly necessary food.

After several weeks, Jason leaves the city in search of the grubbers, who live in harmony with the harsh environment. They practice what many would consider suicidal forms of animal husbandry, with the assistance of their telepathic "talkers". Jason is able to earn their trust by demonstrating his own abilities. The outsiders' knowledge of the initial colonization effort is even more intriguing than that of the city dwellers. Not long after their arrival, animals suddenly began attacking the city, and have not stopped since. However, a number of colonists lived outside the city. Though they still found the planet incredibly harsh, they never suffered such attacks. The grubbers are their descendants. The two factions despise each other. The grubbers hate the city Pyrrans, or "junkmen", for cutting them off from space and refusing to trade food or ore for scientific knowledge or advanced technology, particularly medicine. The junkmen hate the grubbers for thriving while they are dying.

While studying the grubber community, he notices an anomaly—though the life-forms throughout the area are dangerous, they are nowhere near as lethal as the ones around the city. Some grubbers theorize that the initial schism was a disagreement over the city's location, in which the ancestors of the grubbers abandoned the dangerous ground in favor of their current homes. Jason has the grubbers guide him back to the city, so he can see it from the outside. There his psionic senses confirm his hypothesis. Every species of native flora and fauna is psionic, and all life around the city is telepathically "shouting" the same thing: "KILL THE ENEMY!" Pyrrus' biosphere is intentionally attacking the city.

Jason shares this information with the grubbers and wins their total support. They ask Jason to go back to civilization and return with a ship. In return they will reward him handsomely. Jason agrees, but only to get back to the city. He knows that though the grubbers would keep their word, the first thing they would get from civilization would be weapons with which to make war on the city. He has a better idea, and shares it with Kerk along with the truth about the attacks.

Jason builds a device that can track the intelligence giving commands to the native flora and fauna to attack the city, and puts it in the city's spaceship to search. They detect that the psychic commands emanate from a cave on an island far from the city. Jason prepares to go down and "talk" to what may be an alien intelligence, but the junkmen decide instead to attack and kill the intelligence. The resulting battle ends with hundreds dead, along with the intelligence after the entire island is destroyed in a nuclear blast. However, the attacks on the city grow even worse than before. Kerk blames Jason for the loss of the attack team (although the order to attack was given by him) and the futility of the plan and prepares to kill him. Jason is barely able to flee in an escape pod, but it is shot down by Kerk.

Jason crashes into the jungle and is stricken with a Pyrran infection. He awakens in the grubber village. The grubbers witnessed his escape and killed a junkman for his medkit to treat Jason. Then the village's "quakeman", who is precognitive, warns of an impending quake. The grubbers put Jason on a stretcher and follow the quakeman as they run from the village, accompanied by just about every animal in the area. A tectonic event hits the village, flattening it. The animals flee together, without attacking each other.

Jason realizes the nature of the conflict. But he needs to tell everyone—grubbers and junkmen—at the same time. He plans an attack on the city, based heavily on the talkers. By stirring up an animal attack on the city opposite the spaceport they easily take the spaceship, and therefore the city. Jason is thus able to get the grubbers and junkmen into a room without them killing each other.

Jason now reveals all. Although all life on Pyrrus competes for survival individually, they react collectively to natural disasters. The grubbers, with the assistance of their talkers, have integrated themselves peacefully into the planet's ecosystem, killing only for food or in self-defense. The junkmen, however, think only of killing, and kill everything they can simply because they can. The animals and plants band together against the common threat and cooperate in trying to eliminate them, mutating to better kill humans. Jason proves this to the junkmen, first by having the grubbers safely handle one of the city's ultralethal species, then doing it himself. The city's science director pretends he is handling a training aid, and is able to do the same.

With this knowledge and the cooperation of both Pyrran communities, Jason offers a solution. As the prejudices between the two cultures are generations old, the two communities cannot simply merge. Instead, select junkmen will live among the grubbers to learn their methods of coexistence, and in exchange selected grubbers will be given transport on the city's only spaceship to restore their connection with the rest of humanity. Trade will be continued fairly, with the grubbers trading food and ore to the city Pyrrans for technology and medicines. The educational system will be completely redesigned around grubber survival techniques, after which the city's children will live in new lodgings outside the besieged city, which will remain home to those who cannot adapt to the wilds of Pyrrus. Though the city will inevitably fall to the onslaught, those who have adapted will no longer be grubbers or junkmen, but simply Pyrrans. Kerk and the leader of the grubbers make peace.

== Deathworld 2 ==
In Deathworld 2, Jason is kidnapped by the religious fanatic Mikah, who is determined to bring him back to the planet Cassylia, ostensibly to be tried for his various crimes but really (Cassylia does not want Jason returned, since his huge winnings have been spent and the planet has used the incident to promote the "honesty" of its casino) to help Mikah's religious movement to overthrow the government, which they consider corrupt. Jason forces a crash-landing on a planet where the human population has regressed. The technology is extremely primitive and knowledge is split up among many small clans, each one jealously monopolizing what it knows. Jason uses his ingenuity to survive, trading his knowledge for protection and power. He eventually allies with a clan which has the knowledge of electricity. He creates innovations and machinery for the clan, in the process devising a crude device that signals his location to a spaceship piloted by his Pyrran girlfriend, Meta.

== Deathworld 3 ==
In Deathworld 3, Jason invites those Pyrrans who cannot adapt to the changes on their home world to colonize "Felicity", a planet rich in mineral wealth, but home to humans who are divided into two primitive societies, reminiscent of early Asia. One is an agrarian society living in towns and cities; the other is composed of nomadic clans that constantly fight amongst each other, strongly reminiscent of the Mongols before they invaded China and settled down. The two are divided by an impassable, miles-high, continent-spanning cliff. Most of the warlike clans have recently been united under a wily leader calling himself Temujin.

Jason tries to infiltrate the warrior society and use his Pyrrans to wrestle the leadership of the clans away from Temujin, but is unmasked as an off-worlder and thrown down a deep cave. He survives the fall, landing in a bank of snow and finds that it is a passageway through the cliff. Jason changes his plans and contacts Temujin, who takes him for an unkillable demon. Jason offers the barbarian leader his greatest wish, to conquer the rest of the continent. Temujin does indeed prove unstoppable, but is perceptive enough to realize, at the peak of his triumph, that he has to pay an enormous price for what he has won, as his people are becoming corrupted by the easy life of civilisation and will forget their nomadic ways.

== Continuations ==
=== "The Mothballed Spaceship" ===
In "The Mothballed Spaceship", a hostile armada is heading towards Earth, and its government contracts Jason and the Pyrrans to reactivate an ancient mothballed battleship. It is cheaper to use the battleship, a relic from the First Galactic War, than it is to build a fleet from scratch. Unfortunately, when the ship was deactivated for storage, or "mothballed", it was programmed to destroy any approaching object so it could not be stolen by Earth's enemies. The only way it can be used is if it receives the correct codeword.

The armada is just weeks away, so Jason and Kerk must race against time to enter the ship. Jason approaches the problem with intelligence and guile, and is able to board it with plenty of time to spare. Kerk's Pyrran combat skills then make short work of the ship's on-board defenses. But when they reach the control center, the computer starts a self-destruct sequence—a final option to keep the ship from being "stolen".

Just in time, Jason's Pyrran lover, Meta, discovers the correct codeword, canceling the self-destruct. It turns out to have been a simple five-letter word in Esperanto: "Haltu" or, "Stop".

This short story was featured in Astounding: The John W. Campbell Memorial Anthology which was published after the death of the famed, influential editor.

=== Return to Deathworld ===
The Return to Deathworld series is a collaboration between Harry Harrison and Russian authors Ant Skalandis and Mikhail Akhmanov and has never been published in English. The exact share of Harrison's participation is unclear, as Skalandis has also written several sequels to late Edmond Hamilton's books, and they were published in Russian under both their names.

These are:

- Возвращение в Мир смерти (Return to Deathworld. 1998) by Harrison and Skalandis
- Мир смерти против флибустьеров (Deathworld vs. Filibusters, 1998) by Harrison and Skalandis
- Мир смерти и твари из преисподней (The Creatures from Hell, 1999) by Harrison and Skalandis
- Мир смерти. Недруги по разуму (Foes in Intelligence, also known as Deathworld 7, 2001) by Harrison and Akhmanov

In Return to Deathworld, a strange planetoid is detected heading for a densely populated star cluster. Anybody who looks at it or a recording of it is overcome by irrational fear. The collective governing body of the cluster hires the Pyrrans to investigate and, if the planetoid is dangerous, destroy it. Things get complicated when the planetoid is discovered to arrive from another universe with different physical laws (e.g. π is exactly 2) and Jason and Meta get kidnapped by the insane master in control of the thing.

The second part of Return to Deathworld describes Jason's adventures at the galactic core, strangely mirroring the ancient myth of the Argonauts (including the fact that the hero is named Jason and the battleship's new name is Argo). In fact, Jason recognizes the parallel and attempts to alter the outcome.

In Deathworld vs. Filibusters, the remains of the defeated armada (mentioned in "The Mothballed Spaceship") turn to piracy under the leadership of one Henry Morgan. Jason dinAlt is hired by the same casino he won a fortune from at the start of the series to steal back the money Morgan took from the casino. Jason's plan fails when he and Meta are captured by Morgan's men and taken to their hidden planet. In no time, Jason makes up another daring plan—lead the pirates to Pyrrus for a pirate-Pyrran face-off.

In The Creatures from Hell, strange eruptions occur all over a semi-backward planet. Unknown creatures are seen rising from the lava. As usual, the planetary authorities turn to Pyrrus for help. As the Pyrrans begin to investigate, the truth is revealed about the rulers of the planet and the crops they are growing there.

In Foes in Intelligence, super-titled Deathworld 7, the Roog civilization plans to invade Pyrrus. In order to ensure the success of the operation, they decide to kidnap one of the Pyrran leaders for study. As luck would have it, instead of their original target (Kerk Pyrrus), the Roogs kidnap Jason dinAlt—the only Pyrran who would even think of trying to convince the captors that "trade is better than war".
