= One Step from Earth =

Collection of science fiction stories by Harry Harrison

- First edition cover
- Author: Harry Harrison
- Language: English
- Genre: Science fiction
- Publisher: Macmillan
- Publication date: 1970

One Step from Earth is a collection of science fiction stories by American writer Harry Harrison, published in 1970. The stories in the collection are tied together by the central theme of teleportation, or matter transmission as the author phrases it.

== Content ==
The collection includes the following short stories:

- "One Step from Earth"
- "Pressure"
- "No War, or Battle's Sound"
- "Wife to the Lord"
- "Waiting Place"
- "The Life Preservers"
- "From Fanaticism, or for Reward"
- "Heavy Duty"
- "A Tale of the Ending"
