= You Can Be the Stainless Steel Rat =

Novel by Harry Harrison

You Can Be the Stainless Steel Rat is a novel by Harry Harrison published in 1988.

== Plot summary ==
You Can Be the Stainless Steel Rat is a novel in which the reader is a nameless new recruit of the Special Corp. The reader can move to numbered paragraphs like a gamebook.

== Reception ==
Dave Langford reviewed You Can Be the Stainless Steel Rat for White Dwarf #73, and stated that "(Harrison), a talented and able writer, shows his versatility by effortlessly turning off these qualities...he cracks some good jokes, but literary ability seems irrelevant to these game books (look at the people who usually write them). Playability? Unless you get bored and go to sleep there's no way to lose, or to escape the linear 'plot' to which Harrison has merely added decorative, swiftly returning loops...My all-purpose review for such efforts is designed to appease the publishers: 'This one is a real page-turner!'"

== Reviews ==
- Science Fiction Chronicle
