= War with the Robots =

- Cover of first edition
- Author: Harry Harrison
- Cover artist: John Schoenherr
- Genre: Science fiction
- Publisher: Pyramid Books
- Publication date: 1962
- OCLC: 2129119
- Dewey Decimal: 813.54
- LC Class: PS3558.A667

War with the Robots (pub: 1962) is a collection of science fiction stories, written by Harry Harrison in 1956–1961. The collection is tied together by a central theme of robots being able to do things better than humans.

The collection includes the short stories:

- "Simulated Trainer"
- "The Velvet Glove"
- "Arm of the Law"
- "The Robot Who Wanted to Know"
- "I See You"
- "The Repairman"
- "Survival Planet"
- "War with the Robots"
