= The Stainless Steel Rat Gets Drafted =

1987 novel by Harry Harrison

The Stainless Steel Rat Gets Drafted is a novel by Harry Harrison published in 1987.

== Plot summary ==
The Stainless Steel Rat Gets Drafted is a novel in which the master-criminal's plans for revenge involve him joining an army.

== Reception ==
Dave Langford reviewed The Stainless Steel Rat Gets Drafted for White Dwarf #95, and stated that "Very much the mixture as before."

== Reviews ==
- Review by L. J. Hurst (1988) in Vector 142
- Review by Colin Bird (1988) in Paperback Inferno, #74
- Review [Swedish] by Tommy Persson (1988) in Månblad Alfa, 2 1988
