= Nova 1 =

1970 anthology edited by Harry Harrison

- first edition cover
- Editor: Harry Harrison
- Cover artist: Johannes Regn
- Language: English
- Genre: Science fiction
- Publisher: Delacorte Press
- Publication date: 1970
- Publication place: United States
- Media type: Print (Hardcover, Paperback)
- Pages: xi + 222
- OCLC: 60433
- Followed by: Nova 2

Nova 1 is the first in a series of four anthologies of original science fiction stories edited by American writer Harry Harrison, published by Delacorte Press in 1970. A Science Fiction Book Club edition was issued later that year, with a Dell paperback reprint following in 1971. A British paperback appeared in 1975, with an abridged British hardcover following in 1976. Nova 1 placed 15th in the 1971 Locus Poll in the Anthologies/Collections category.

== Contents ==
- "Introduction", Harry Harrison
- "The Big Connection", Robin Scott Wilson
- "A Happy Day in 2381", Robert Silverberg
- "Terminus Est", Barry N. Malzberg
- "Hexamnion", Chan Davis
- "And This Did Dante Do", Ray Bradbury
- "The Higher Things", John R. Pierce
- "Swastika!", Brian W. Aldiss
- "The HORARS of War", Gene Wolfe
- "Love Story in Three Acts", David Gerrold
- "Jean Duprès", Gordon R. Dickson
- "In the Pocket", Barry N. Malzberg
- "Mary and Joe", Naomi Mitchison
- "Faces & Hands", James Sallis
- "The Winner", Donald E. Westlake
- "The Whole Truth", Piers Anthony

All stories were original to the anthology except "And This Did Dante Do", originally published as "Dusk in the Electric Cities, And This Did Dante Do" in Florida Quarterly in 1967, and "Swastika!", originally published in Aldiss's Moment of Eclipse in 1970. "The Big Connection" appeared under the "Robin Scott" byline. "In The Pocket" appeared under Malzberg's "K. M. O'Donnell" pseudonym.

"Jean Duprès" was nominated for the Hugo Award for Best Short Story.

== Reception ==
James Blish reviewed the anthology favorably, saying "almost everything in the book is good; to my judgment, the standard is higher than it has been in any of the Orbit anthologies to date, and it's substantially longer, too."
