= Prime Number (short story collection) =

1970 short story collection by Harry Harrison

Cover of the first edition, published by Berkley Books.

Prime Number published in 1970, is a collection of science fiction stories by American writer Harry Harrison.

== Contents ==
- "Mute Milton"
- "The Greatest Car in the World"
- "The Final Battle"
- "The Powers of Observation"
- "The Ghoul Squad"
- "Toy Shop"
- "You Men of Violence"
- "The Finest Hunter in the World"
- "Down to Earth"
- "Commando Raid"
- "Not Me, Not Amos Cabot!"
- "The Secret of Stonehenge"
- "Incident in the IND"
- "If"
- "Contact Man"
- "The Pad: a Story of the Day After Tomorrow"
- "A Civil Service Servant"
- "A Criminal Act"
- "Famous First Words"

== Reception ==
Dave Pringle reviewed Prime Number for Imagine magazine, and stated that "These early stories are mostly light and bright".

== Reviews ==
- Review by Charlie Brown (1970) in Locus, #64 September 30, 1970
- Review by Nik Morton (1984) in Paperback Inferno, Volume 7, Number 4
