= Return to Eden (novel) =

1988 novel by Harry Harrison

- First U.S. ed.
- Author: Harry Harrison
- Cover artist: Gino D'Achille
- Language: English
- Series: West of Eden
- Release number: 3
- Genre: Science fiction, Alternate history
- Publisher: Grafton, Bantam Books
- Publication date: October 1988
- Publication place: United Kingdom
- Media type: Print (Hardcover)
- Pages: 496
- ISBN: 0-246-13380-5 (U.K.); 0-553-05315-9 (U.S.)
- OCLC: 1012761394
- Dewey Decimal: 813.5/4
- LC Class: PS3558.A667R48 1988
- Preceded by: Winter in Eden

Return To Eden is a 1988 science fiction novel by American writer Harry Harrison. The novel is the third and final volume in Harrison's West of Eden trilogy.

== Plot ==
Kerrick's tribe, which now includes the two male Yilanè who have elected to remain with him, live an almost idyllic life at a small lake, until a raiding party from Alpèsak captures and rapes one of the males, who later dies. The tribe moves east and find a peaceful island. Later Herilak's tribe joins them.

The scientist Ambalasi studies the primitive Yilanè, in between solving the problems involved in getting the Daughters of Life to work, since they are all regarded as equal, so none may lead the work force.

Vaintè makes her way along the coast to a Yilanè city. She persuades the leader there to let her lead a group in search of the Daughters of Life, secretly planning to seek out and kill Kerrick and the other humans.

The weapons the humans stole from the Yilanè begin to die. Without them, they won't be able to kill the larger dinosaurs which threaten their safety this far south. However, the expedition goes wrong and Lanefenuu, who is the leader of Alpèsak now learns of their presence. Ambalasi contacts Lanefenuu to divert their attention while the Daughters of Life try to recruit new members and some males. This mission also fails.

The expedition of Vaintè contacts Lanefenuu and learns the whereabouts of the Daughters of Life. They capture Ambalasi as ordered, but then Vaintè turns on her leader and takes Enge hostage. She finds Kerrick, but before killing him, the surviving Yilanè male kills her.
