= Harry Harrison (writer) =

American science fiction author (1925–2012)

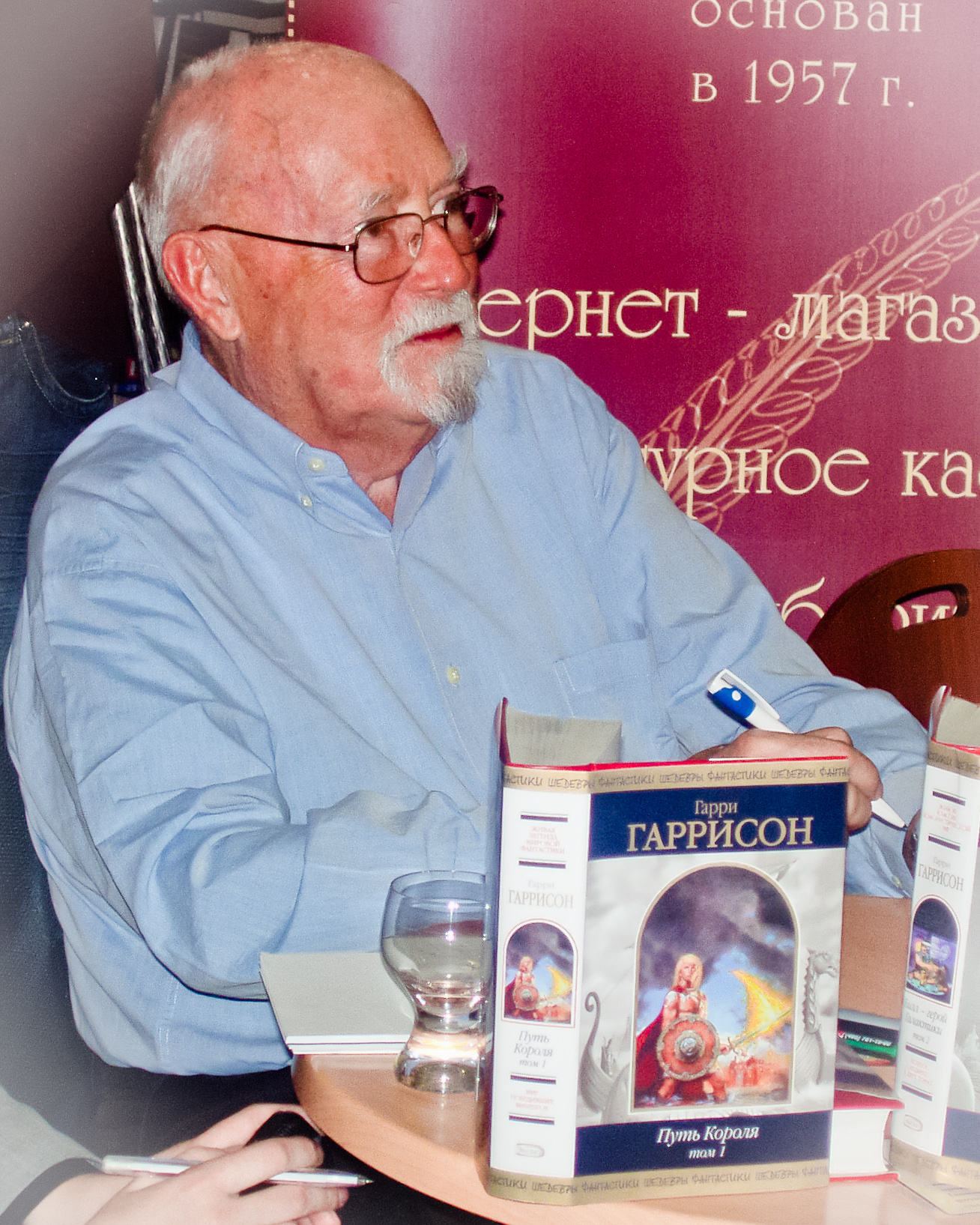
- Harrison in 2008
- Born: Henry Maxwell Dempsey; March 12, 1925; Stamford, Connecticut, U.S.
- Died: August 15, 2012 (aged 87); Brighton, England
- Occupations: Writer, illustrator
- Spouse(s): Evelyn Harrison (div. 1951); Joan Merkler Harrison (1954–2002, her death)
- Children: 2
- Writing career
- Period: 1951–2010
- Genres: Science fiction, satire
- Notable awards: Inkpot Award (2004)
- Website: harryharrison.com

Harry Max Harrison (born Henry Maxwell Dempsey; March 12, 1925 – August 15, 2012) was an American science fiction author, known mostly for his character The Stainless Steel Rat and for his novel Make Room! Make Room! (1966). The latter was the rough basis for the motion picture Soylent Green (1973). Long resident in both Ireland and the United Kingdom, Harrison was involved in the foundation of the Irish Science Fiction Association, and was, with Brian Aldiss, co-president of the Birmingham Science Fiction Group.

Aldiss called him "a constant peer and great family friend". His friend Michael Carroll said of Harrison's work: "Imagine Pirates of the Caribbean or Raiders of the Lost Ark, and picture them as science-fiction novels. They're rip-roaring adventures, but they're stories with a lot of heart." Novelist Christopher Priest wrote in an obituary:

Harrison was an extremely popular figure in the SF world, renowned for being amiable, outspoken and endlessly amusing. His quickfire, machine-gun delivery of words was a delight to hear, and a reward to unravel: he was funny and self-aware, he enjoyed reporting the follies of others, he distrusted generals, prime ministers and tax officials with sardonic and cruel wit, and above all he made plain his acute intelligence and astonishing range of moral, ethical and literary sensibilities.

== Career ==
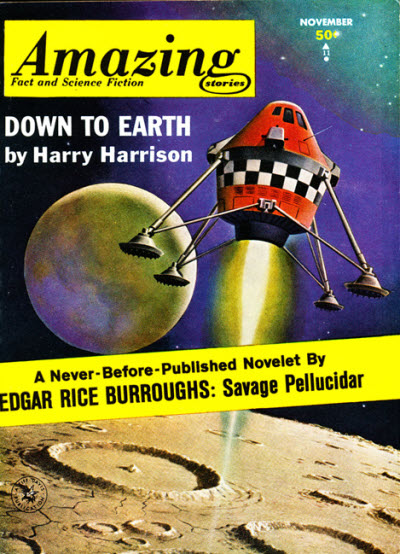
Harrison's novelette "Down to Earth" took the cover of the November 1963 issue of Amazing Stories.

Before becoming an editor and writer, Harrison started in the science fiction field as an illustrator, notably with EC Comics' two science fiction comic book series, Weird Fantasy and Weird Science. In these and other comic book stories, he most often worked with Wally Wood. Wood usually inked over Harrison's layouts, and the two freelanced for several publishers and genres, including westerns and horror comics. He and Wood split up their partnership in 1950 and went their separate ways. Harrison used house pen names such as Wade Kaempfert and Philip St. John to edit magazines and published other fiction under the pen names Felix Boyd and Hank Dempsey (see Personal Life below). Harrison ghostwrote Vendetta for the Saint, one of the long-running series of novels featuring Leslie Charteris' character The Saint. Harrison also wrote for syndicated comic strips including ghostwriting The Saint comic strip from 1955 to 1960, and wrote several stories for the character Rick Random.

His first short story, "Rock Diver", was published in the February 1951 issue of Worlds Beyond, edited by Damon Knight; the magazine had previously published his illustrations. While in New York, he socialized at the Hydra Club, an organization of New York's science fiction writers, including Isaac Asimov, Alfred Bester, James Blish, Anthony Boucher, Avram Davidson, Judith Merril, and Theodore Sturgeon.

Harrison has become much better known for his later writing, particularly for his humorous and satirical science fiction, such as the Stainless Steel Rat series and his novel Bill, the Galactic Hero—which parodied the works of Isaac Asimov. Priest wrote:

His most popular and best-known work is contained in fast-moving parodies, homages or even straight reconstructions of traditional space-opera adventures. He wrote several named series of these: notably the Deathworld series (three titles, starting in 1960), the Stainless Steel Rat books (12 titles, from 1961), and the sequence of books about Bill, the Galactic Hero (seven titles, from 1965). These books all present interesting contradictions: while being exactly what they might superficially seem to be, unpretentious action novels with a strong streak of humour, they are also satirical, knowing, subversive, unapologetically anti-military, anti-authority and anti-violence. Harrison wrote such novels in the idiom of the politically conservative hack writer, but in reality he had a liberal conscience and a sharp awareness of the lack of literary values in so much of the SF he was parodying.

Adi Robertson agreed: "His books toed the line between science fiction adventure, humor, and satire, often with a strong anti-military bent informed by his time in the U.S. Army Air Forces."

During the 1950s and 1960s, he was the main writer of the Flash Gordon newspaper strip. One of his Flash Gordon scripts was serialized in Comics Revue magazine. Harrison drew sketches to help the artist be more scientifically accurate, which the artist largely ignored.

Not all of Harrison's writing was comic. He wrote many stories on serious themes, of which by far the best known is the novel about overpopulation and consumption of the world's resources, Make Room! Make Room! (1966), which was used as a basis for the 1973 science fiction film Soylent Green (though the film changed aspects of the plot).

For a time Harrison was closely associated with Brian Aldiss. They collaborated on a series of anthology projects and did much in the 1970s to raise the standards of criticism in the field, including institution of the John W. Campbell Memorial Award for Best Science Fiction Novel. Priest wrote, "In 1965 Harrison and Aldiss published the first issue (of two) of the world's first serious journal of SF criticism, SF Horizons. Together they edited many anthologies of short stories, each one illustrating the major themes of SF, and although not intended as critical apparatus the books were a way of delineating the unique material of the fantastic. As committed internationalists, the two men created World SF, an organisation of professionals intended to encourage and enhance the writing of non-anglophone SF." In particular, the two edited nine volumes of The Year's Best Science Fiction anthology series as well as three volumes of the Decade series, collecting science fiction of the 1940s, 1950s and 1960s respectively.

In 1971, he and Brian Aldiss became honorary co-presidents of the Birmingham Science Fiction Group, the UK's longest-established regional sf society. In 1990, Harrison was the professional Guest of Honor at ConFiction, the 48th World SF Convention, in The Hague, Netherlands, together with Joe Haldeman and Wolfgang Jeschke.

Harrison did not win a major genre award for any specific work of fiction. The Science Fiction Hall of Fame inducted Harrison in 2004 and the Science Fiction and Fantasy Writers of America named him its 26th SFWA Grand Master in 2008 (presentation of the Damon Knight Award following in 2009). He became a cult hero in Russia, where he won the 2008 Golden Roscon award for lifetime achievement in science fiction.

== Personal life ==
=== Early life ===
Harrison was born March 12, 1925, as Henry Maxwell Dempsey in Stamford, Connecticut. His father, Henry Leo Dempsey, a printer who was three-fourths of Irish descent, changed his name to Harrison soon after Harry was born. Harry did not know this himself until he was 30 years old, at which point he changed his name to Harry Max Harrison in court. His mother, Ria, née Kirjassoff, was Russian Jewish. She had been born in Riga, Latvia, and grew up in Saint Petersburg, Russia. Her brother, Max David Kirjassoff (1888–1923), had been an American consul in Japan, but he died along with his wife Alice during the 1923 Great Kantō earthquake.

After finishing Forest Hills High School in 1943, Harrison was drafted into the U.S. Army Air Forces during World War II as a gunsight technician and as a gunnery instructor. Priest adds that he became a sharpshooter, a military policeman, and a specialist in the prototypes of computer-aided bomb-sights and gun turrets. "But overall the army experience vested in him a hatred of the military that was to serve him well as a writer later on."

In 1946, he enrolled in Hunter College in New York City and later ran a studio selling illustrations to comics and science fiction magazines.

=== Marriages ===
Harrison married Evelyn Harrison, whom he included in a cartoon he drew of the Hydra Club in 1950. They divorced in 1951, and Evelyn married the science fiction writer Lester del Rey shortly afterwards.

Harrison married Joan Merkler Harrison in 1954. Their marriage lasted until her death of cancer in 2002. They had two children, Todd (born in 1955, died in November, 2025) and Moira (born in 1959), to whom he dedicated his novel Make Room! Make Room!

=== Esperanto ===
In his middle years, Harrison became an advocate of Esperanto, saying he could "write and speak it with an automatic ease I have never been able to capture in any language other than my native English"; he learned it, according to Christopher Priest, out of boredom during military service. The language often appears in his novels, particularly in his Stainless Steel Rat and Deathworld series.

He was the honorary president of the Esperanto Association of Ireland, where he had moved in the 1970s, living with his family in a home he built in the Vale of Avoca in County Wicklow. He also held memberships in other Esperanto organizations such as Esperanto-USA (formerly the "Esperanto League for North America"), of which he was an honorary member, and the Universala Esperanto-Asocio (World Esperanto Association), of whose Honorary Patrons' Committee he was a member.

=== Residences ===
Harrison resided in many parts of the world including Mexico, England, Italy, Denmark, and Ireland.

Priest writes that Harrison made many household moves abroad:

As the market for comics began to shrink, and then expire, Harrison started writing for science-fiction magazines. The paltry financial rewards led him ... to move from New York. The chance came with what seemed at the time like a large payment from a magazine for his first full-length novel, Deathworld. He drove his family in an antiquated camper van to Mexico and remained there for a year. It was the first of many international moves, something that became characteristic. He went from Mexico to Britain, then to Italy, then to Denmark. He liked Denmark and stayed for seven years, seeing it as a perfect place to bring up his children, but eventually he realised that unless he made a conscious decision to leave, they could easily remain there for ever. The family moved back to the US, to San Diego, California, where he reckoned heating bills would be low, but by the mid-1970s he was back in the UK.

After many years of moving around and raising children, he spent most of his later years residing in Ireland. Because Harrison had an Irish grandparent, he was able to assume citizenship, and by taking advantage of the Irish tax exemption for artists, he enjoyed tax-free status.

Harrison also kept an apartment in London for many years, and later in Brighton, these being used for his frequent visits to England, and when Joan died in 2002, his British home became permanent.

Harrison's official website, launched at the Irish national convention a few years earlier, announced his death on August 15, 2012, at his apartment in Brighton, England.

On learning of his death on August 15, 2012, Harlan Ellison said, "It's a day without stars in it."

== Published works ==
=== Novels ===
Year	Title	Author Credit	Series	Notes
1960	Deathworld	Harry Harrison	Deathworld; No.1	First published as an illustrated serial in the British children's comic "The Eagle"
1961	The Stainless Steel Rat	Harry Harrison	The Stainless Steel Rat; No.4	Later adapted as a comic strip for 2000 AD.
1962	Planet of the Damned	Harry Harrison	Brion Brandd	Variant title: Sense of Obligation (1967); serialized under this variant title in 1961.
1964	Vendetta for the Saint	Leslie Charteris		Ghostwritten by Harrison, credited to Leslie Charteris, and based upon Charteris's mystery series The Saint.
1964	Deathworld 2	Harry Harrison	Deathworld; No.2	Originally serialised as The Ethical Engineer
1965	Plague from Space	Harry Harrison		Expanded and reissued as The Jupiter Plague (1982)
1965	Bill, the Galactic Hero	Harry Harrison	Bill, the Galactic Hero	
1966	Make Room! Make Room!	Harry Harrison		Basis for the 1973 science fiction movie Soylent Green starring Charlton Heston
1967	The Technicolor Time Machine	Harry Harrison		
1968	Deathworld 3	Harry Harrison	Deathworld; No.3	Originally serialised in 1968 as The Horse Barbarians
1969	Captive Universe	Harry Harrison		
1970	The Daleth Effect	Harry Harrison		Variant title: In Our Hands, the Stars, 1970. Serialised 1969-70 under this variant title.
1970	The Stainless Steel Rat's Revenge	Harry Harrison	The Stainless Steel Rat; No.5	
1970	Spaceship Medic	Harry Harrison		
1972	Tunnel Through the Deeps	Harry Harrison		Variant title: A Transatlantic Tunnel, Hurrah!
1972	Montezuma's Revenge	Harry Harrison	Tony Hawkin	
1972	The Stainless Steel Rat Saves the World	Harry Harrison	The Stainless Steel Rat; No.6	Later adapted as a comic strip for 2000 AD.
1972	Stonehenge	Harry Harrison and Leon Stover		This version was heavily cut from the manuscript; 1983 edition, titled Stonehenge: Where Atlantis Died, restores the full original text.
1973	Star Smashers of the Galaxy Rangers	Harry Harrison		
1974	Queen Victoria's Revenge	Harry Harrison	Tony Hawkin	
1975	The California Iceberg	Harry Harrison		
1976	Skyfall	Harry Harrison		
1977	The Lifeship	Harry Harrison and Gordon R. Dickson		Variant title: Lifeboat
1978	The Stainless Steel Rat Wants You	Harry Harrison	The Stainless Steel Rat; No.7	
1980	The QE2 Is Missing (aka The QEII Is Missing)	Harry Harrison		Non-science fiction. A political thriller about South American politics, Nazis and arms dealers set on a cruise ship.
1980	Homeworld	Harry Harrison	To the Stars; No.1	
1981	Wheelworld	Harry Harrison	To the Stars; No.2	
1981	Starworld	Harry Harrison	To the Stars; No.3	
1981	Planet of No Return	Harry Harrison	Brion Brandd	
1982	Invasion: Earth	Harry Harrison		
1982	The Stainless Steel Rat for President	Harry Harrison	The Stainless Steel Rat; No.8	Later adapted as a comic strip for 2000 AD.
1983	A Rebel In Time	Harry Harrison		
1984	West of Eden	Harry Harrison	Eden; No.1	
1985	A Stainless Steel Rat is Born	Harry Harrison	The Stainless Steel Rat; No.1	
1986	Winter in Eden	Harry Harrison	Eden; No.2	
1987	The Stainless Steel Rat Gets Drafted	Harry Harrison	The Stainless Steel Rat; No.2	
1988	Return to Eden	Harry Harrison	Eden; No.3	
1989	Bill, the Galactic Hero on the Planet of Robot Slaves	Harry Harrison	Bill, the Galactic Hero	
1990	Bill, the Galactic Hero on the Planet of Bottled Brains	Harry Harrison and Robert Sheckley	Bill, the Galactic Hero	
1991	Bill, the Galactic Hero on the Planet of Tasteless Pleasure	Harry Harrison and David Bischoff	Bill, the Galactic Hero	
1991	Bill, the Galactic Hero on the Planet of Zombie Vampires	Harry Harrison and Jack C. Haldeman II	Bill, the Galactic Hero	
1991	Bill, the Galactic Hero on the Planet of Ten Thousand Bars	Harry Harrison and David Bischoff	Bill, the Galactic Hero	Variant title: Bill, the Galactic Hero on the Planet of Hippies from Hell
1991	Bill, the Galactic Hero: The Final Incoherent Adventure	Harry Harrison and David Harris	Bill, the Galactic Hero	
1992	The Turing Option	Harry Harrison and Marvin Minsky		
1993	The Hammer and the Cross	Harry Harrison and John Holm	The Hammer and the Cross	"John Holm" is a pseudonym of Tom Shippey.
1994	The Stainless Steel Rat Sings the Blues	Harry Harrison	The Stainless Steel Rat; No.3	
1994	One King's Way	Harry Harrison and John Holm	The Hammer and the Cross	"John Holm" is a pseudonym of Tom Shippey.
1995	Warriors of the Way	Harry Harrison and John Holm	The Hammer and the Cross	Omnibus edition the first two novels. "John Holm" is a pseudonym of Tom Shippey.
1996	The Stainless Steel Rat Goes to Hell	Harry Harrison	The Stainless Steel Rat; No.9	
1997	King and Emperor	Harry Harrison and John Holm	The Hammer and the Cross	"John Holm" is a pseudonym of Tom Shippey.
1998	Stars and Stripes Forever	Harry Harrison	Stars and Stripes; No.1	
1998	Return to Deathworld	Harry Harrison and Ant Skalandis	Deathworld	Only published in Russian, Lithuanian, Polish and Czech.
1998	Deathworld vs. Filibusters	Harry Harrison and Ant Skalandis	Deathworld	Only published in Russian, Lithuanian, Polish and Czech.
1999	The Creatures from Hell	Harry Harrison and Ant Skalandis	Deathworld	Only published in Russian, Lithuanian and Polish.
1999	The Stainless Steel Rat Joins the Circus	Harry Harrison	The Stainless Steel Rat; No.10	
2000	Stars and Stripes in Peril	Harry Harrison	Stars and Stripes; No.2	
2001	Deathworld 7	Harry Harrison and Mikhail Ahmanov	Deathworld	Only published in Russian and Lithuanian.
2002	Stars and Stripes Triumphant	Harry Harrison	Stars and Stripes; No.3	
2010	The Stainless Steel Rat Returns	Harry Harrison	The Stainless Steel Rat; No.11	

=== Novella and novelettes ===
- The Man from P.I.G. and The Man from R.O.B.O.T. (1974): These two linked novellas, featuring interstellar intelligence agents, were comedy-drama take-offs on The Man from U.N.C.L.E. The first tells of an agent of the Porcine Interstellar Guard, who performs his missions with the help of several pigs. The second tells of Henry Venn, an agent for "Robot Obtrusion Battalion—Omega Three", who poses as an interplanetary robot salesman while searching for a missing Galactic Census official on a planet populated by paranoid colonists. They were originally published as novelettes in Analog in July 1967 and July 1969.
- Planet Story (1978), novella, published as a large format book with colour illustrations by Jim Burns

=== Short story collections ===
See List of short stories by Harry Harrison

- War with the Robots (1962)
- Two Tales and Eight Tomorrows (1965)
- Prime Number (1970)
- One Step from Earth (1970)
- The Best of Harry Harrison (1976)
- Stainless Steel Visions (1993)
- Galactic Dreams (1994)
- 50 In 50 (2001)

=== Omnibus volumes ===
- The Deathworld Trilogy (1974): Omnibus of Deathworld, Deathworld 2 & Deathworld 3) (vt. The Deathworld Omnibus, 1999) (the BenBella [2005] edition adds the short story `The Mothballed Spaceship' from Astounding: The John W. Campbell Memorial Anthology (1973))
- The Adventures of the Stainless Steel Rat (1978) - omnibus collection of The Stainless Steel Rat, The Stainless Steel Rat's Revenge and The Stainless Steel Rat Saves the World
- To the Stars (1991) - omnibus collection of the three "To The Stars" novels
- Warriors of the Way (1995), with "John Holm", a pseudonym of Tom Shippey: Omnibus of The Hammer and the Cross and One King's Way
- A Stainless Steel Trio (2002) - omnibus collection of A Stainless Steel Rat is Born, The Stainless Steel Rat Gets Drafted and The Stainless Steel Rat Sings the Blues

=== Comics ===
- Rick Random with artist Ron Turner (trade paperback: October 2008, ISBN 1-85375-673-3)
- The Saint (1955–1960)
- Flash Gordon (1958–1964), reprinted in Comics Revue.
- The Stainless Steel Rat (1979–1985) was adapted into a comic strip in the magazine 2000 AD by Kelvin Gosnell, with artist Carlos Ezquerra (trade paperback: July 2010, ISBN 1-906735-51-4)
- Harry Harrison's Bill, The Galactic Hero Comics; 3 issues

=== Miscellanea ===
- You Can Be the Stainless Steel Rat: An Interactive Game Book 1988 - choose your own adventure-style interactive novel
- Short story: The Return of the Stainless Steel Rat 1981 - published in Ares Magazine #10 by Simulations Publications Incorporated. The magazine issue included a solitaire paragraph game designed by Greg Costikyan

=== Non-fiction books ===
- Ahead of Time, with Theodore J. Gordon (Doubleday, 1972)
- SF Horizons, with Brian W. Aldiss (Arno Press, 1975), ISBN 0-405-06320-2. A photographic reprint of the two issues of a critical magazine published in 1964 and 1965.
- Hell's Cartographers: Some Personal Histories of Science Fiction Writers, with Brian Aldiss (Harper & Row, 1976) ISBN 0-06-010052-4.
- Great Balls of Fire! A History of Sex in Science Fiction Illustration (Pierrot Publishing, ISBN 0-905310-07-1; Grosset & Dunlap, ISBN 0-448-14377-1; both 1977)
- Mechanismo: An Illustrated Manual of Science Fiction Hardware (Reed Books, 1978) ISBN 0-89169-504-4 — technical illustrations by Brian Lewis
- Spacecraft in Fact and Fiction, with Malcolm Edwards (Exeter Books, 1979) ISBN 0-89673-019-0
- Harry Harrison! Harry Harrison!: A Memoir, (Tor, 2014) ISBN 978-0-7653-3308-7

=== Anthologies (as editor) ===
- John W. Campbell: Collected Editorials from Analog (1966)
- Nebula Award Stories Two (1967) (with Brian Aldiss) (vt, Nebula Award Stories 1967)
- Apeman, Spaceman (1968) (with Leon Stover)
- Best SF: 1967 (1968) (vt, The Year's Best Science Fiction) (with Brian Aldiss)
- Farewell, Fantastic Venus (1968) (abr as vt, All About Venus, 1968)
- SF: Author's Choice (1968) (vt, A Backdrop of Stars)
- Best SF: 1968 (1969) (rev vt, The Year's Best Science Fiction No. 2) (with Brian Aldiss)
- Blast Off: SF for Boys (1969)
- Four for the Future (1969)
- Worlds of Wonder (1969)
- Best SF: 1969 (1970) (vt, The Year's Best Science Fiction No. 3) (with Brian Aldiss)
- Nova 1 (1970) (rev edition 1976, UK hc)
- SF: Author's Choice 2 (1970)
- The Year 2000 (1970)
- Best SF: 1970 (1971) (vt, The Year's Best Science Fiction No. 4) (with Brian Aldiss)
- The Light Fantastic (1971)
- SF: Author's Choice 3 (1971)
- The Astounding-Analog Reader, Volume One (1972) (with Brian Aldiss) (later split into two paperbacks: The Astounding-Analog Reader, Book 1 & The Astounding-Analog Reader, Book 2)
- Ahead of Time (1972)
- Best SF: 1971 (1972) (vt, The Year's Best Science Fiction No. 5) (with Brian Aldiss)
- Nova 2 (1972)
- The Astounding-Analog Reader, Volume Two (1973) (with Brian Aldiss) (only one edition; NOT the same book as The Astounding-Analog Reader, Book 2 above)
- Astounding: John W. Campbell Memorial Anthology (1973) (vt, The John W. Campbell Memorial Anthology)
- Best SF: 1972 (1973) (vt, The Year's Best S.F. 1972) (with Brian Aldiss)
- Nova 3 (1973) (vt, The Outdated Man)
- A Science Fiction Reader (1973) (with Carol Pugner)
- Best SF: 1973 (1974) (abr vt, The Year's Best Science Fiction No. 7) (with Brian Aldiss)
- Nova 4 (1974)
- SF: Author's Choice 4 (1974)
- Best SF: 1974 (1975) (abr vt, The Year's Best Science Fiction No. 8) (with Brian Aldiss)
- Decade: The 1940s (1975) (with Brian Aldiss)
- Hell's Cartographers: Some Personal Histories of Science Fiction Writers (1975) (with Brian Aldiss) (memoirs by SF writers)
- Science Fiction Novellas (1975) (with Willis E. McNelly)
- Best SF: 1975, The Ninth Annual (1976) (vt, The Year's Best Science Fiction No. 9) (with Brian Aldiss)
- Decade: The 1950s (1976) (with Brian Aldiss)
- Decade: The 1960s (1977) (with Brian Aldiss)
- There Won't Be War (1991) (with Bruce McAllister)
