= Sam Hall =

Sam Hall may refer to:

== People ==
- Samantha Hall (scientist) (born 1982), Australian environmental researcher
- Sam Hall (diver) (1937–2014), American Olympic diver and member of the Ohio House of Representatives
- Sam Hall (rugby league) (born 2002), rugby league footballer
- Sam Hall (skier) (born 1988), Australian freestyle skier
- Sam Hall (writer) (1921–2014), American screenwriter
- Sam B. Hall Jr. (1924–1994), U.S. Representative from Texas

== Media ==
- "Sam Hall" (song), an English folk song
- Sam Hall (story), a story by Poul Anderson

== See also ==
- Samantha Hall (disambiguation)
- Samuel Hall (disambiguation)
