= Samuel Hall =

Samuel or Sam Hall may refer to:

- Sam B. Hall Jr. (1924–1994), U.S. Representative from Texas
- Sam Hall (diver) (1937–2014), American Olympic diver and member of the Ohio House of Representatives
- Sam Hall (writer) (1921–2014), American screenwriter
- Samuel A. Hall (died 1887), associate justice of the Supreme Court of Georgia
- Samuel Carter Hall (1800–1889), Irish journalist
- Samuel H. P. Hall (1804–1877), New York politician
- Samuel Read Hall (1795–1877), American educator
- Samuel Hall (inventor) (1782–1863), English inventor
- Samuel Hall (judoka) (born 1995), British judoka
- Samuel Hall (politician) (1797–1862), lieutenant governor of Indiana 1840–1843
- Samuel Hall (printer) (1740–1807), American publisher and printer

== See also ==
- "Sam Hall" (song), an English folk song
- Sam Hall (story), a story by Poul Anderson
- Sam Hall (rugby league) (born 2002), rugby league player
- Sam Hall (skier) (born 1988), Australian freestyle skier
- Samantha Hall (born 1982), Australian environmental researcher
- William Samuel Hall (1871–1938), Canadian dentist and politician
- Samuel Hall-Thompson (1885–1954), Unionist politician from Northern Ireland
