= Malzberg =

Malzberg is a surname. Notable people with the surname include:

- Barry N. Malzberg (1939–2024), American writer and editor
  - Barry N. Malzberg bibliography
- Steve Malzberg (born 1959), American television and radio host, syndicated columnist, and political commentator
