= Barry N. Malzberg bibliography =

List of the published work of Barry N. Malzberg, American writer.

== Novels ==
- 1968 Screen
- 1968 Oracle of the Thousand Hands
- 1969 The Empty People (writing as K. M. O'Donnell)
- 1970 Dwellers of the Deep (writing as K. M. O'Donnell)
- 1971 Confessions of Westchester County
- 1971 Universe Day (writing as K. M. O'Donnell)
- 1971 The Falling Astronauts
- 1971 Gather in the Hall of the Planets (writing as K. M. O'Donnell)
- 1971 In My Parents' Bedroom
- 1971 The Spread
- 1972 Beyond Apollo
- 1972 Overlay
- 1972 The Horizontal Woman
- 1972 The Masochist
- 1972 The Men Inside
- 1972 Revelations
- 1973 Phase IV, adapted from the screenplay by Mayo Simon
- 1973 Herovit's World
- 1973 In the Enclosure
- 1973 Tactics of Conquest
- 1973 Opening Fire
- 1973 The Way of the Tiger, The Sign of the Dragon [Kung Fu #1] (writing as Howard Lee)
- 1974 Tactics of Conquest
- 1974 The Destruction of the Temple
- 1974 On a Planet Alien
- 1974 The Sodom and Gomorrah Business
- 1974 The Day of the Burning
- 1974 Underlay
- 1975 Guernica Night
- 1975 The Gamesman
- 1975 Galaxies
- 1975 Conversations
- 1976 The Running of Beasts (with Bill Pronzini)
- 1976 Chorale
- 1976 Scop
- 1977 The Last Transaction
- 1977 Lady of a Thousand Sorrows (writing as Lee W. Mason)
- 1977 Acts of Mercy (with Bill Pronzini)
- 1978 Chorale
- 1979 Night Screams (with Bill Pronzini)
- 1980 Prose Bowl (with Bill Pronzini)
- 1982 The Cross of Fire
- 1985 The Remaking of Sigmund Freud

=== As "Mike Barry" - The Lone Wolf series ===
- 1973 Night Raider
- 1973 Bay Prowler
- 1973 Boston Avenger
- 1974 Desert Stalker
- 1974 Havana Hit
- 1974 Chicago Slaughter
- 1974 Peruvian Nightmare
- 1974 Los Angeles Holocaust
- 1974 Miami Marauder
- 1975 Harlem Showdown
- 1975 Detroit Massacre
- 1975 Phoenix Inferno
- 1975 The Killing Run
- 1975 Philadelphia Blow-Up

=== Pseudonymous erotic novels ===
- 1967 Love Doll (Softcover - as Mel Johnson)
- 1968 I, Lesbian (Midwood - as M.L. Johnson)
- 1968 Just Ask (Midwood - as Mel Johnson)
- 1968 Instant Sex (Midwood - as Mel Johnson)
- 1968 Chained (Midwood - as Mel Johnson)
- 1968 Kiss and Run (Midwood - as Mel Johnson)
- 1969 Nympho Nurse (Midwood - as Mel Johnson)
- 1969 The Sadist (Midwood - as Mel Johnson)
- 1969 Diary of a Parisian Chambermaid (Midwood - as Claudine Dumas)
- 1969 Do It To Me (Midwood - as Mel Johnson)
- 1969 Born to Give (Midwood - as Mel Johnson)
- 1969 Campus Doll (Midwood - as Mel Johnson)
- 1969 The Box (Oracle Books - as Mel Johnson)
- 1969 A Way With All Maidens (Oracle Books - as Mel Johnson)
- 1969 The Circle (Olympia Press - as Francine di Natale)
- 1969 Southern Comfort (Olympia Press 460 - as Gerrold Watkins)
- 1970 A Bed of Money (Olympia Press 474 - as Gerrold Watkins)
- 1970 A Satyr's Romance (Olympia Press 476 - as Gerrold Watkins)
- 1970 Giving It Away (Olympia Press 479 - as Gerrold Watkins)
- 1970 The Art of the Fugue (Olympia Press 483 - as Gerrold Watkins)

== Collections ==
- 1969 Final War: And Other Fantasies (writing as K M O'Donnell)
- 1971 In the Pocket: And Other SF Stories (writing as K M O'Donnell)
- 1971 Universe Day (writing as K M O'Donnell)
- 1974 Out From Ganymede
- 1975 The Many Worlds of Barry Malzberg
- 1975 The Best of Barry N. Malzberg
- 1976 Down Here In The Dream Quarter
- 1979 Malzberg At Large
- 1980 The Man Who Loved the Midnight Lady: A Collection
- 1982 The Engines of the Night: Science Fiction in the Eighties (Essays, with some fiction)
- 1994 The Passage of the Light-The Recursive Science Fiction of Barry N. Malzberg (with Tony Lewis and Mike Resnick)
- 2000 In the Stone House
- 2001 Shiva: And Other Stories
- 2003 Problems Solved (all stories collaborations with Bill Pronzini). Crippen & Landru
- 2007 Breakfast in the Ruins (A much expanded version of "The Engines of the Night")
- 2013 The Very Best of Barry N. Malzberg
- 2023 Collaborative Capers (edited by Robert Friedman)
- 2024 Collecting Myself: The Uncollected Stories of Barry N. Malzberg (edited by Robert Friedman and Gregory Shepard)

== Short fiction ==
Title	Date published	Publication details
"The Sense of the Fire"	January 1967	Escapade
"We're Coming Through the Window"	August 1967	Galaxy Science Fiction
"The Market in Aliens"	November 1968	Galaxy Science Fiction
"Final War"	April 1968	The Magazine of Fantasy & Science Fiction
"Cop-Out"	October 1969	Final War and Other Fantasies
"Death to the Keeper"	August 1968	The Magazine of Fantasy & Science Fiction
"Oaten"	October 1969	Fantastic
"How I Take Their Measure"	January 1969	The Magazine of Fantasy & Science Fiction
"The Major Incitement to Riot"	February 1969	Fantastic
"The Ascension"	April 1969	Fantastic
"The Brain Surgeon"	April 1969	Fantastic
"July 24, 1970"	May 1969	Venture Science Fiction
"A Triptych"	July 1969	The Magazine of Fantasy & Science Fiction
"By Right of Succession"	October 1969	If
"The Falcon and the Falconeer"	December 1969	The Magazine of Fantasy & Science Fiction
"What Time Was That?"	December 1969	If
"In the Pocket"	February 1970	Nova 1
"Pacem Est"	January 1970	Infinity One
"Terminus Est"	February 1970	Nova 1
"Making Titan"	July 1970	The Magazine of Fantasy & Science Fiction
"As Between Generations"	October 1970	Fantastic
"Notes Just Prior to the Fall"	October 1970	The Magazine of Fantasy & Science Fiction
"Beyond Sleep"	November 1970	Ellery Queen's Mystery Magazine
"The New Rappacini"	December 1970	Fantastic
"A Question of Slant"	September 1971	In the Pocket: And Other SF Stories
"Addendum"	September 1971	In the Pocket: And Other SF Stories
"Ah, Fair Uranus"	September 1971	In the Pocket: And Other SF Stories
"Bat"	September 1971	In the Pocket: And Other SF Stories
"Conquest"	1971	New Dimensions 1
"Elephants"	1971	Infinity Two
"Exploration"	1971	Mars, We Love You
"Notes for a Novel About the First Ship Ever to Venus"	1971	Universe 1
"The Idea"	September 1971	In the Pocket: And Other SF Stories
"Gehenna"	March 1971	Galaxy Science Fiction
"Yearbook"	May 1971	The Magazine of Fantasy & Science Fiction
"Agony Column"	December 1971	Ellery Queen's Mystery Magazine
"Causation"	December 1971	The Magazine of Fantasy & Science Fiction
"In the Cup"	1972	Signs and Wonders
"Inter Alia"	1972	Infinity Three
"Out from Ganymede"	December 1972	New Dimensions II: Eleven Original Science Fiction Stories
"Report of the Defense"	December 1974	Out from Ganymede
"Some Notes Toward a Useable Past"	December 1974	Out from Ganymede
"The Art of Fiction"	1972	Mike Shayne Mystery Magazine Annual #2
"The Conquest of Mars"	December 1974	Out from Ganymede
"The Men Inside"	December 1972	New Dimensions II: Eleven Original Science Fiction Stories
"Two Odysseys Into the Center"	October 1972	Nova 2
"Pater Familias" (with Kris Neville)	March 1972	The Magazine of Fantasy & Science Fiction
"Still-Life"	March 1972	Again, Dangerous Visions
"Cornell"	April 1972	Ellery Queen's Mystery Magazine
"Breaking In"	June 1972	Fantastic
"Vidi Vici Veni"	July 1972	Generation: An Anthology of Speculative Fiction
"Allowances"	August 1972	Fantastic
"The Interceptor"	December 1974	Out from Ganymede
"A Short Religious Novel"	September 1972	The Magazine of Fantasy & Science Fiction
"The Ballad of Slick Sid"	November 1972	Infinity Four
"Chronicles of a Comer"	December 1972	And Walk Now Gently Through the Fire and Other Science Fiction Stories
"Making It Through"	December 1972	And Walk Now Gently Through the Fire and Other Science Fiction Stories
"Bearing Witness"	1973	Flame Tree Planet: An Anthology of Religious Science-Fantasy
"Conversations at Lothar's"	1973	Children of Infinity
"Dreaming and Conversions: Two Rules by Which to Live"	1973	Nova 3
"Geraniums"	1973	Omega
"Getting Around"	1973	Frontiers 1; Tomorrow's Alternatives
"Introduction to the Second Edition"	January 1976	The Best of Barry N. Malzberg
"Opening Fire"	1973	Frontiers 2; The New Mind
"Running Around"	1973	Omega
"The Battered-Earth Syndrome"	July 1973	Saving Worlds
"The Destruction and Exculpation of Earth"	December 1976	Down Here in the Dream Quarter
"The Truth of It"	1973	Science Fiction Adventure from Way Out
"Those Wonderful Years"	1973	Frontiers 1; Tomorrow's Alternatives
"Ups and Downs"	1973	Eros in Orbit
"Vox Populi"	Autumn/Winter 1973	Edge
"Yahrzeit"	September 1973	Ten Tomorrows
"On Ice"	January 1973	Amazing Science Fiction
"Outside"	January 1973	The Magazine of Fantasy & Science Fiction
"Linkage"	March 1973	Demon Kind
"The Second Short Shortest Fantasy"	May 1973	The Magazine of Fantasy & Science Fiction
"Trashing"	May 1973	Infinity Five
"The Union Forever"	June 1973	Showcase
"City Lights, City Nights"	July 1973	Future City
"Culture Lock"	July 1973	Future City
"Revolution"	July 1973	Future City
"Isaiah"	September 1973	Fantastic
"Tapping Out"	September 1973	Future Quest
"The Helmet"	September 1973	The Magazine of Fantasy & Science Fiction
"Notes Leading Down to the Conquest"	October 1973	New Dimensions 3
"Closed Sicilian"	November 1973	The Magazine of Fantasy & Science Fiction
"Triptych"	November 1973	Fantastic
"After the Great Space War"	December 1976	Down Here in Dream Quarter
"An Oversight"	January 1976	The Best of Barry N. Malzberg
"Fireday: Firenight"	1974	The Far Side of Time: Thirteen Original Stories
"Guidance"	1974	Journey to Another Star and Other Stories
"Inner Circle"	1974	Vampires, Werewolves and Other Monsters
"Institutions"	1974	Survival from Infinity
"It Doesn't Really Matter"	1974	The Graduated Robot and Other Stories
"It Wasn't My Fault"	1974	The Missing World and Other Stories
"Making It All the Way into the Future on Gaxton Falls of the Red Planet"	1974	Nova 4
"Meeting the Aliens on Algol IV"	1974	Survival from Infinity
"Natural History"	1974	Long Night of Waiting by Andre Norton and other stories
"Night of the Wolf"	1974	Vampires, Werewolves and Other Monsters
"November 22, 1963"	December 1974	Out from Ganymede
"Oversight"	July 1974	Strange Gods
"Testify"	1974	Vampires, Werewolves and Other Monsters
"The Student"	1974	Vampires, Werewolves and Other Monsters
"The Trippers"	1974	Long Night of Waiting by Andre Norton and other stories
"The Wonderful, All-Purpose Transmogrifier"	1974	Final Stage: The Ultimate Science Fiction Anthology
"As in a Vision Apprehended"	January 1974	The Berserkers
"Form in Remission"	January 1974	The Berserkers
"Network"	January 1974	Fantastic
"Trial of the Blood"	January 1974	The Berserkers
"A Delightful Comedic Premise"	February 1974	The Magazine of Fantasy & Science Fiction
"At the Institute"	March 1974	Fantastic
"Closing the Deal"	March 1974	Analog Science Fiction/Science Fact
"Upping the Planet"	April 1974	Amazing Science Fiction
"Overlooking"	June 1974	Amazing Science Fiction
"Before the Great Space-War"	July 1974	Alternities
"Track Two"	July 1974	Fantastic
"Twenty Sixty-one"	July 1974	The Magazine of Fantasy & Science Fiction
"Hanging"	September 1974	Fantastic
"Over the Line"	1974	Future Kin
"Try Again"	July 1974	Strange Gods
"State of the Art"	October 1974	New Dimensions IV
"The Whatever-I-Type-is-True Machine"	November 1974	The Magazine of Fantasy & Science Fiction
"Sedan Deville"	December 1974	The Magazine of Fantasy & Science Fiction
"A Summary of Events Leading Up to Bedlam"	1975	Beware More Beasts
"After the Unfortunate Accident"	1975	The Many Worlds of Barry Malzberg
"Going Down"	1975	Dystopian Visions
"Initiation"	1975	The Many Worlds of Barry Malzberg
"Leviticus: In the Ark"	November 1975	Epoch
"Management"	1975	The Many Worlds of Barry Malzberg
"Reconstitution"	1975	The Many Worlds of Barry Malzberg
"Report to Headquarters"	April 1975	New Dimensions Science Fiction Number 5
"Streaking"	January 1975	Future Corruption
"Uncoupling"	1975	Dystopian Visions
"January 1975"	January 1975	Analog Science Fiction/Science Fact
"On the Campaign Trail"	January 1975	Future Corruption
"Dance"	April 1975	Fantastic
"Coming Again" (with Bill Pronzini)	June 1975	The Magazine of Fantasy & Science Fiction
"A Galaxy Called Rome"	July 1975	The Magazine of Fantasy & Science Fiction
"Transfer"	August 1975	Fantastic
"The Thing Down Hallway 9"	December 1975	Fantastic
"And Still in the Darkness"	January 1976	The Best of Barry N. Malzberg
"Impasse"	Spring 1976	Odyssey
"Multiples" (with Bill Pronzini)	1976	Tricks and Treats
"Thirty-Seven Northwest"	December 1976	Down Here in the Dream Quarter
"What the Board Said"	January 1976	The Best of Barry N. Malzberg
"Redundancy"	December 1976	Down Here in the Dream Quarter
"Seeking Assistance"	April 1976	The Magazine of Fantasy & Science Fiction
"I'm Going Through the Door"	May 1976	Galaxy Science Fiction
"On the Air"	May 1976	New Dimensions Science Fiction Number 6
"Inaugural"	November 1976	Galaxy Science Fiction
"In the Stocks"	April 1977	New Dimensions Science Fiction Number 7
"The Man Who Loved the Midnight Lady"	May 1977	Midnight Specials: An Anthology for Train Buffs and Suspense Aficionados
"Re-Entry"	February 1977	Fantastic
"Shibboleth"	March 1977	Amazing Stories
"Night Rider" (with Bill Pronzini)	June 1977	Alfred Hitchcock's Mystery Magazine
"The Man Who Married a Beagle"	June 1977	Fantastic
"Indigestion"	September 1977	Fantastic
"Choral"	October 1977	Graven Images
"The Several Murders of Roger Ackroyd"	October 1977	Isaac Asimov's Science Fiction Magazine
"On Account of Darkness"	November 1977	The Magazine of Fantasy & Science Fiction
"Here, For Just a While"	April 1978	Fantastic
"Inside Out"	May 1978	Alfred Hitchcock's Mystery Magazine
"Prowl"	July 1978	Fantastic
"A Clone at Last" (with Bill Pronzini)	October 1978	The Magazine of Fantasy & Science Fiction
"Another Burnt-Out Case"	October 1978	Fantastic
"Line of Succession"	October 1978	Alfred Hitchcock's Mystery Magazine
"Varieties of Technological Experience"	October 1978	Analog Science Fiction/Science Fact
"Backing Up"	November 1978	Alfred Hitchcock's Mystery Magazine
"Out of Quarantine" (with Bill Pronzini)	November 1978	Isaac Asimov's Science Fiction Magazine
"Clocks" (with Bill Pronzini)	November 1979	Shadows 2
"Nightshapes"	March 1979	Werewolf!
"Varieties of Religious Experience"	April 1980	The Man Who Loved the Midnight Lady
"The Appeal"	March 1979	Alfred Hitchcock's Mystery Magazine
"Reaction-Formation"	April 1979	Alfred Hitchcock's Mystery Magazine
"Prose Bowl" (with Bill Pronzini)	July 1979	The Magazine of Fantasy & Science Fiction
"Reading Day" (with Bill Pronzini)	September 1979	Chrysalis 5
"Demystification of Circumstance"	November 1979	The Magazine of Fantasy & Science Fiction
"Le Croix"	February 2013	The Very Best of Barry N. Malzberg
"Revelation in Seven Stages"	October 1980	Mummy!: A Chrestomathy of Crypt-ology
"The Last One Left" (with Bill Pronzini)	January 1980	The Magazine of Fantasy & Science Fiction
"Thirty-Six Views of His Dead Majesty"	January 1980	Chrysalis 6
"Into the Breach"	April 1980	The Man Who Loved the Midnight Lady
"September 1958"	April 1980	The Man Who Loved the Midnight Lady
"Le Croix (The Cross)"	May 1980	Their Immortal Hearts: Three Visions of Time
"Fascination"	August 1980	The Magazine of Fantasy & Science Fiction
"Getting Back" (with Jeffrey W. Carpenter)	September 1980	The Magazine of Fantasy & Science Fiction
"Opening a Vein" (with Bill Pronzini)	November 1980	Shadows 3
"They Took It All Away"	November 1980	Amazing Stories
"The Twentieth Century Murder Case"	December 1980	The Magazine of Fantasy & Science Fiction
"Calling Collect"	October 1981	Shadows 4
"In Our Image"	February 1981	The Magazine of Fantasy & Science Fiction
"Icons"	March 1981	Omni
"The Containment of Calpel V"	March 1981	Amazing Stories
"Parables of Art" (with Jack Dann)	June 1981	New Dimensions 12
"On the Nature of Time" (with Bill Pronzini)	September 1981	Amazing Stories
"There the Lovelies Bleeding"	September 1981	The Magazine of Fantasy & Science Fiction
"Chained"	1982	Specter!
"Corridors"	February 1982	The Engines of the Night: Science Fiction in the Eighties
"The Trials of Rollo"	March 1982	Amazing Science Fiction Stories
"Do I Dare to Eat a Peach?" (with Bill Pronzini)	April 1982	Speculations
"Coursing"	April 1982	Isaac Asimov's Science Fiction Magazine
"Anderson"	June 1982	Amazing Science Fiction Stories
"Blair House"	June 1982	The Magazine of Fantasy & Science Fiction
"Rocket City"	September 1982	Isaac Asimov's Science Fiction Magazine
"Shakespeare MCMLXXXV" (with Bill Pronzini)	November 1982	The Magazine of Fantasy & Science Fiction
"What We Do on Io"	February 1983	The Magazine of Fantasy & Science Fiction
"Reparations"	August 1983	The Magazine of Fantasy & Science Fiction
"Spree"	April 1984	Witches
"76 Ways to Kill an Indian"	March 1984	Fantasy Book
"The Second Short-Shortest Fantasy Story Ever Ever Published"	March 1984	100 Great Fantasy Short Short Stories
"To Mark the Times We Had"	November 1984	Omni
"Away"	1985	A Treasury of American Horror Stories
"Johann Sebastian Brahms"	August 1985	Universe 15
"Quartermain"	January 1985	Isaac Asimov's Science Fiction Magazine
"1984"	February 1985	The Magazine of Fantasy & Science Fiction
"Reason Seven"	May 1985	Omni
"The High Purpose" (with Carter Scholz)	November 1985	The Magazine of Fantasy & Science Fiction
"Tap-Dancing Down the Highways and Byways of Life, etc."	July 1986	The Magazine of Fantasy & Science Fiction
"Bringing It Home"	February 1987	Rod Serling's The Twilight Zone Magazine
"The Queen of Lower Saigon"	February 1987	In the Field of Fire
"Celebrating"	August 1987	The Magazine of Fantasy & Science Fiction
"Ambition"	October 1987	Rod Serling's The Twilight Zone Magazine
"Blues and the Abstract Truth" (with Jack Dann)	January 1987	The Magazine of Fantasy & Science Fiction
"No Hearts, No Flowers"	February 1988	14 Vicious Valentines
"The Prince of the Steppes"	June 1988	The Magazine of Fantasy & Science Fiction
"The Smooth Universe by R***** S*********"	September 1988	Shaggy B.E.M. Stories
"Hop Skip Jump"	October 1988	Omni
"Getting Up" (with Jack Dann)	November 1988	Tropical Chills
"Time-Tracker"	April 1989	Phantoms
"All Assassins"	August 1989	What Might Have Been? Volume 1: Alternate Empires
"The Present Eternal"	September 1989	Foundation's Friends: Stories in Honor of Isaac Asimov
"O Thou Last and Greatest!"	October 1989	The Magazine of Fantasy & Science Fiction
"Darwinian Facts"	December 1990	Stalkers
"Safety Zone"	October 1990	New England Ghosts: Haunting, Spine-chilling Stories from the New England States
"Another Goddamned Showboat"	January 1990	What Might Have Been? Vol II: Alternate Heroes
"Playback"	April 1990	Universe 1
"Nordic Blue"	June 1990	Dick Tracy: The Secret Files
"What I Did to Blunt the Alien Invasion"	April 1991	Omni
"Police Actions"	June 1991	Full Spectrum 3
"Morning Light"	August 1991	Cold Shocks
"Folly for Three"	November 1991	A Whisper of Blood
"One Ten Three"	December 1991	Horse Fantastic
"Turpentine"	December 1991	What Might Have Been? Volume 3: Alternate Wars
"Dumbarton Oaks"	July 1992	MetaHorror
"Götterdämmerung"	January 1992	After the King: Stories in Honor of J. R. R. Tolkien
"Improvident Excess"	December 2000	In the Stone House
"In the Stone House"	July 1992	Alternate Kennedys
"Major League Triceratops" (with Joyce Malzberg)	October 1992	The Ultimate Dinosaur
"Heavy Metal"	February 1992	Alternate Presidents
"Kingfish"	February 1992	Alternate Presidents
"Most Politely, Most Politely"	March 1992	Universe 2
"Life in the Air" (with Jack Dann)	April 1992	Amazing Stories
"Ship Full of Jews"	April 1992	Omni
"Concerto Accademico"	May 1992	Dragon Fantastic
"Amos"	July 1992	The Magazine of Fantasy & Science Fiction
"Is This the Presidential Palace?"	November 1992	Science Fiction Age
"Of Dust and Fire and the Night"	November 1992	Christmas Bestiary
"Grand Tour"	December 1992	Aladdin: Master of the Lamp
"On the Heath"	December 1992	Aladdin: Master of the Lamp
"Fugato"	September 1993	Alternate Warriors
"Rex Tremandae Majestatis" (with Kathe Koja)	July 1993	Dinosaur Fantastic
"Standing Orders"	January 1993	Journeys to the Twilight Zone
"The High Ground" (with Kathe Koja)	October 1993	Temporary Walls: An Anthology of Moral Fantasy
"The Lady Louisiana Toy"	May 1993	More Whatdunits
"The Timbrel Sound of Darkness"	November 1993	Christmas Ghosts
"Standards and Practices"	April 1993	The Magazine of Fantasy & Science Fiction
"Andante Lugubre"	May 1993	Science Fiction Age
"Art Appreciation" (with Jack Dann)	September 1993	Omni
"Ghosts" (with Mike Resnick)	September 1993	Honor of the Regiment
"The Passage of the Light"	November 1993	Science Fiction Age
"In the Greenhouse" (with Kathe Koja)	November 1994	Love in Vein: Twenty Original Tales of Vampiric Erotica
"It Comes from Nothing"	July 1994	Weird Tales from Shakespeare
"Modern Romance" (with Kathe Koja)	October 1994	Dark Voices 6: The Pan Book of Horror
"Moishe in Excelsis"	October 1994	Deals with the Devil
"Notes Toward a Useable Past"	June 1994	The Passage of the Light: The Recursive Science Fiction of Barry N. Malzberg
"Sinfonia Expansiva"	September 1994	Little Deaths: 24 Tales of Sex and Horror
"The Careful Geometry of Love" (with Kathe Koja)	September 1994	Little Deaths: 24 Tales of Sex and Horror
"Thus, to the Stars" (with Carter Scholz)	September 1994	Galaxy Science Fiction
"Allegro Marcato"	January 1994	By Any Other Fame
"Hitler at Nuremberg"	January 1994	By Any Other Fame
"The Only Thing You Learn"	April 1994	Universe 3
"Close-Up Photos Reveal JFK Skull on Moon!"	June 1994	Alien Pregnant By Elvis
"Understanding Entropy"	July 1994	Science Fiction Age
"Literary Lives" (with Kathe Koja)	October 1994	Alternate Outlaws
"Buyer's Remorse" (with Kathe Koja)	September 1995	How to Save the World
"In The Last Chamber" (cowritten with Kathe Koja)	1997	Alternate Tyrants
"The Intransigents"	December 2000	In the Stone House
"High concept" (with Bill Pronzini)	March 2013	Analog
Malzberg, Barry N. & Bill Pronzini (April 2015). "Transfer point". Analog Science Fiction and Fact. 135 (4): 49–53.	April 2015	Malzberg, Barry N. & Bill Pronzini (April 2015). "Transfer point". Analog Science Fiction and Fact. 135 (4): 49–53.
Malzberg, Barry N. & Robert Friedman. "Let the Games Begin"	July/August 2023	Isaac Asimov's Science Fiction Magazine
Malzberg, Barry N. & Robert Friedman. "Big Trouble in Sector C"	Winter 2024	The Magazine of Fantasy & Science Fiction
Malzberg, Barry N. & Robert Friedman. "Game, Set, Match"	January/February 2024	Analog

== Nonfiction ==
- 1982 The Engines of the Night: Science Fiction in the Eighties
- Malzberg, Barry N. (March 2001). "Passing for Human, by Jody Scott (1977)". Curiosities. F&SF. 100 (3): 162.
- 2010 The Business of Science Fiction: Two Insiders Discuss Writing and Publishing with Mike Resnick
- 2018 The Bend at the End of the Road.
