= In the Pocket: And Other SF Stories =

In The Pocket: And Other SF Stories
- First edition cover
- Author: Barry N. Malzberg
- Cover artist: Karel Thole
- Language: English
- Genre: Science fiction
- Publisher: Ace Books
- Publication date: 1971
- Publication place: United States
- Media type: Print (Paperback)
- Pages: 132
- OCLC: 317812387

In The Pocket: And Other SF Stories is a collection of science fiction stories by American writer Barry N. Malzberg, published under his "K. M. O'Donnell" byname. The collection was issued as an Ace Double in 1971, bound together with Malzberg's Gather in the Hall of the Planets.

== Contents ==
- "Author’s Introduction"
- "In the Pocket" (Nova 1 1970)
- "Gehenna" (Galaxy 1971)
- "Ah, Fair Uranus" (original)
- "Notes Just Prior to the Fall" (F&SF 1970)
- "As Between Generations" (Fantastic 1970)
- "The Falcon and the Falconeer" (F&SF 1969)
- "July 24, 1970" (Venture 1969)
- "Pacem Est" (written with Kris Neville) (Infinity #1 1970)
- "The New Rappacini" (Fantastic 1970)
- "Bat" (original)
- "A Question of Slant" (original)
- "What Time Was That?" (If 1969)
- "A Soulsong to the Sad, Silly, Soaring Sixties" (Fantastic 1971)
- "Addendum" (original)
- "The Idea" (original)

All stories were originally credited to "K. M. O'Donnell", except that "Gehenna", "Notes Just Prior to the Fall", "As Between Generations", "The Falcon and the Falconeer", "The New Rappacini", "What Time Was That?" and "A Soulsong to the Sad, Silly, Soaring Sixties" carried Malzberg's own byline; "Pacem Est" was credited to "O'Donnell" and Neville.

== Reception ==
Theodore Sturgeon described the collection as "one of the most remarkable volumes I have ever held in my hands," saying "Malzberg/O'Donnell is a first-water, don't-give-a-damn writer."

== See also ==
- Barry N. Malzberg bibliography
