= The Best of Mack Reynolds =

1976 collection of science fiction short stories by Mack Reynolds

- Cover of first edition
- Author: Mack Reynolds
- Cover artist: Ed Soyka
- Language: English
- Series: The Best of ... series
- Genre: Science fiction
- Publisher: Pocket Books
- Publication date: 1976
- Publication place: United States
- Media type: Print (paperback)
- Pages: xiv, 365
- ISBN: 0-671-80403-0
- OCLC: 2172224
- Preceded by: The Best of Keith Laumer
- Followed by: The Best of Jack Vance

The Best of Mack Reynolds is a collection of science fiction short stories by American author Mack Reynolds, edited by Adele Leone Hull. It was first published in paperback by Pocket Books in April 1976 as the fourth volume in its Best of ... series.

== Summary ==
The book contains twenty-two short works of fiction, together with an introduction by fellow science fiction writer Barry N. Malzberg and a second, general introduction and introductory notes on the individual stories by the author.

== Contents ==
- "Showing Off Reynolds" (Barry N. Malzberg)
- "Introduction"
- "Down the River" (1950)
- "Come in, Spaceport" (1974)
- "Compounded Interest" (1956)
- "The Business, As Usual" (1952)
- "Freedom" (1961)
- "Revolution" (1960)
- "Burnt Toast" (1955)
- "Your Soul Comes C.O.D." (1952)
- "Good Indian" (1962)
- "No Return from Elba" (1953)
- "Pacifist" (1964)
- "Subversive" (1962)
- "Earthlings Go Home!" (1962)
- "Albatross" (1955)
- "The Enemy Within" (1967)
- "Survivor" (1966)
- "Fad" (1965)
- "Spaceman on a Spree" (1963)
- "The Adventure of the Extraterrestrial" (1965)
- "Utopian" (1970)
- "Prone" (1954)
- "Second Advent" (1974)

== Reception ==
The book was reviewed by Mike Glyer in Delap's F & SF Review, June 1976.
