= The Best of Poul Anderson =

1976 collection of writings by Poul Anderson

- First edition of The Best of Poul Anderson
- Author: Poul Anderson
- Cover artist: Mara McAfee
- Language: English
- Series: Pocket Books's Best of ... series
- Genre: Science fiction
- Publisher: Pocket Books
- Publication date: 1976
- Publication place: United States
- Media type: Print (paperback)
- Pages: xvi, 287
- ISBN: 0-671-80671-8
- Preceded by: The Best of Harry Harrison
- Followed by: The Best of Damon Knight

The Best of Poul Anderson is a collection of science fiction short stories by American author Poul Anderson, edited by Adele Leone Hull. It was first published in paperback by Pocket Books in August 1976 as the seventh volume in its Best of ... series. It was reprinted in August 1979. The book has also been published in German. The pieces were originally published between 1953 and 1970 in the magazines Astounding Science Fiction, Analog, Galaxy Magazine, and The Magazine of Fantasy and Science Fiction, and the anthology The Farthest Reaches.

== Summary ==
The book contains nine novellas, novelettes and short stories, together with an introduction by fellow science fiction writer Barry N. Malzberg and a second, general introduction and introductory notes on the individual stories by the author.

== Contents ==
- "Recollecting Anderson" (Barry N. Malzberg)
- "Introduction"
- "The Longest Voyage"
- "The Barbarian"
- "The Last of the Deliverers"
- "My Object All Sublime"
- "Sam Hall"
- "Kyrie"
- "The Fatal Fulfillment"
- "Hiding Place"
- "The Sky People"

== Awards ==
The book placed thirteenth in the 1977 Locus Poll Award for Best Single Author Collection.

== Reception ==
The book was reviewed by Allan Rothstein in Delap's F & SF Review, March 1977.
