= The Best of Robert Silverberg =

1976 collection of science fiction short stories by Robert Silverberg

- Cover of first edition
- Author: Robert Silverberg
- Cover artist: Alan Magree
- Language: English
- Series: The Best of ... series
- Genre: Science fiction
- Publisher: Pocket Books
- Publication date: 1976
- Publication place: United States
- Media type: Print (paperback)
- Pages: xiv, 258
- ISBN: 0-671-80282-8
- OCLC: 2074772
- Preceded by: The Best of Barry N. Malzberg
- Followed by: The Best of Keith Laumer

The Best of Robert Silverberg is a collection of science fiction short stories by American author Robert Silverberg, edited by Adele Leone Hull. It was first published in paperback by Pocket Books in February 1976 as the second volume in its Best of ... series, and reprinted in September 1980; Baen Books issued a new edition in August 1986. The first American hardcover edition was published by Gregg Press as The Best of Robert Silverberg, Volume I, in June 1978. The first British edition was issued in hardcover by Sidgwick & Jackson in August 1977; and reissued, together with Silverberg's novel Invaders from Earth, in the omnibus hardcover Science Fiction Special (30) in August of the same year. The first British paperback edition was issued by Orbit/Futura in August 1978. The collection has been translated into Spanish, Portuguese and Romanian.

== Summary ==
The book contains ten short works of fiction, together with an introduction by fellow science fiction writer Barry N. Malzberg and a second, general introduction and introductory notes on the individual stories by the author.

== Contents ==
- "Thinking About Silverberg" (Barry N. Malzberg)
- "Introduction"
- "Road to Nightfall" (1958)
- "Warm Man" (1957)
- "To See the Invisible Man" (1963)
- "The Sixth Palace" (1965)
- "Flies" (1967)
- "Hawksbill Station" (1967)
- "Passengers" (1968)
- "Nightwings" (1968)
- "Sundance" (1969)
- "Good News from the Vatican" (1971)

== Awards ==
The collection placed seventh in the 1977 Locus Poll Award for Best Single Author Collection.

== Reception ==
The book was reviewed by Michael Bishop in Delap's F & SF Review, August 1976, Spider Robinson in Galaxy, October 1976, David Wingrove (1976) in Vector 78, 1976, Philip Stephensen-Payne in Paperback Parlour, October 1978, Russell Letson in Science-Fiction Studies, November 1979, and Alberto Cairo in Las 100 mejores novelas de ciencia ficción del siglo XX, 2001.
