= The Falling Astronauts =

1971 novel by Barry N. Malzberg

- Ace Science Fiction Specials first edition
- Author: Barry N. Malzberg
- Cover artist: Davis Meltzer
- Language: English
- Genre: Science fiction
- Publisher: Ace Books (original 1971 edition)
- Publication date: 1971
- Publication place: United States
- Media type: Print (Paperback)
- Pages: 191 (Ace Books edition)
- OCLC: 1099422

The Falling Astronauts is a science fiction novel by American writer Barry N. Malzberg, first published in 1971 in a paperback edition by Ace Books.

In the novel, a disillusioned astronaut agrees to handle the public relations for his intended final mission to test nuclear seismic charges on the Moon. Another astronaut goes rogue and plans to use the nuclear weapons in an attack on Earth.

== Plot summary ==
The novel's protagonist Colonel Richard Martin suffers a mental breakdown during one of the series of space missions to test nuclear seismic charges on the Moon. Disillusioned by the space program, Martin agrees to handle public relations for one more mission before termination. However, the mission to install the seismic charges on the lunar surface goes awry when one of the astronauts goes rogue and threatens nuclear destruction upon Earth.

== Reception ==
In 1972, The Magazine of Fantasy & Science Fiction's Joanna Russ praised The Falling Astronauts with "What is astonishing about this novel is not that the protagonist (the point-of-view character) is mad, but that everyone else is, too. It is eerie to listen to a mad madman being interviewed by a ‘sane’ madman in a world where any pretense to ‘rationality’ is the maddest thing of all." Galaxy Science Fiction's Theodore Sturgeon said "Malzberg gives a voice to the mixed-up, the impotent, to the torment of helplessness—and to the peculiar hope that personal integrity, even if it be irrational or wrong-headed, may just possibly be able to beat the system." In 1973, Algol's Richard A. Lupoff reviewed the novel with "It's a study in the dehumanizing pressure of space-flight, from an author passionately devoted to the notion of space exploration."

In 2013, The Paris Review's J. D. Daniels reviewed Malzberg's work including The Falling Astronauts with "[j]ust because I like it doesn’t mean it isn’t crap." While reviewing Beyond Apollo, The Encyclopedia of Science Fiction's Don D'Ammassa said novels like The Falling Astronauts were "denounced regularly in letter columns and in the fan press."

== In popular fiction ==
Under a pseudonym, Locus Online's Paul Di Filippo reported that on April 1, 2006 writer Barry N. Malzberg was invited by Richard Branson to fly on the spaceflight company Virgin Galactic. The Falling Astronauts was one of the novels that "revealed the rot and canker and delusions at the roots of governmental space travel."

== See also ==
- Ace Science Fiction Specials
- Barry N. Malzberg bibliography
