= Amanda Davies (disambiguation) =

Amanda Davies is a British sports presenter on CNN International.

Amanda Davies may also refer to:

- Amanda Davies (actress)
- Amanda Davies (scientist), Australian geographer and lecturer
