= The Best of Keith Laumer =

1976 collection of science fiction short stories by Keith Laumer

- Cover of first edition
- Author: Keith Laumer
- Cover artist: Charles Moll
- Language: English
- Series: The Best of ... series
- Genre: Science fiction
- Publisher: Pocket Books
- Publication date: 1976
- Publication place: United States
- Media type: Print (paperback)
- Pages: 255
- ISBN: 0-671-80310-7
- OCLC: 2177096
- Preceded by: The Best of Robert Silverberg
- Followed by: The Best of Mack Reynolds

The Best of Keith Laumer is a collection of science fiction short stories by American author Keith Laumer, edited by Adele Leone Hull. It was first published in paperback by Pocket Books in March 1976 as the third volume in its Best of ... series, and reprinted in February 1980.

== Summary ==
The book contains nine short works of fiction, together with an introduction by fellow science fiction writer Barry N. Malzberg introductory notes on the individual stories by the author.

== Contents ==
- "Introduction" (Barry N. Malzberg)
- "The Planet Wreckers" (1967)
- "The Body Builders" (1966)
- "Cocoon" (1962)
- "The Lawgiver" (1970)
- "Thunderhead" (1967)
- "Hybrid" (1961)
- "The Devil You Don't" (1970)
- "Doorstep" (1961)
- "A Relic of War" (1969)

== Reception ==
Spider Robinson in Analog Science Fiction/Science Fact called the book "self-descriptive; high praise indeed," though "to be strictly accurate, the book would have to be several times as long, and contain at least a few Retief stories. But if you like Laumer, you'll love this book—and if you don't, you might get a few surprises."

The book was also reviewed by Neville Angove in SF Commentary #48/49/50, 1976.
