= The Best of Harry Harrison =

1976 collection of writings by Poul Anderson

- Cover of first edition
- Author: Harry Harrison
- Language: English
- Series: Pocket Books's Best of ... series
- Genre: Science fiction
- Publisher: Pocket Books
- Publication date: 1976
- Publication place: United States
- Media type: Print (paperback)
- Pages: ix, 302
- ISBN: 0-671-80525-8
- Preceded by: The Best of Jack Vance
- Followed by: The Best of Poul Anderson

The Best of Harry Harrison is a collection of science fiction short stories by American science fiction and fantasy author Harry Harrison, edited by Adele Leone Hull. It was first published in paperback by Pocket Books in June 1976 as the sixth volume in its Best of ... series.

== Publication history ==
The Best of Harry Harrison was released by Timescape Books and introduced by Barry Malzberg.

== Plot summary ==
The Best of Harry Harrison is a curated collection spanning nearly two decades of Harrison's career, offering readers a cross-section of his short fiction. The collection includes fantasy, science fiction, and genre-defying tales, each prefaced with personal commentary from Harrison himself. These introductions provide insight into the stories' origins, thematic intentions, and private jokes. The book opens with "The Streets of Ashekelon," a piece that faced initial censorship, setting the stage for Harrison's narrative style. While humor is present—most notably in "Captain Honario Harpplayer, R.N."—the collection leans more into Harrison's capacity to critique violence and social complacency, as seen in stories like "I Always Do What Teddy Says" and "A Criminal Act."

== Contents ==
- "Harry Harrison: The Man Who Walked Home" (Barry N. Malzberg)
- "The Streets of Ashkelon" (1962)
- "Captain Honario Harpplayer, R. N." (1963)
- "Rescue Operation" (1964)
- "At Last, the True Story of Frankenstein" (1965)
- "I Always Do What Teddy Says" (1965)
- "Portrait of the Artist" (1964)
- "Not Me, Not Amos Cabot!" (1964)
- "Mute Milto" (1966)
- "A Criminal Act" (1966)
- "Waiting Place" (1968)
- "If" (1969)
- "I Have My Vigil" (1968)
- "From Fanaticism, or for Reward" (1969)
- "By the Falls" (1970)
- "The Ever-Branching Tree" (1970)
- "Brave Newer World" (1971)
- "Roommates" (1971)
- "The Mothballed Spaceship" (1973)
- "An Honest Day's Work" (1973)
- "Space Rats of the C.C.C." (1974)

== Reception ==
C. J. Henderson reviewed The Best of Harry Harrison for Pegasus magazine and stated that "To review each story would take far too long. To give away any of the surprises would be unfair. The best I can do is to direct people to The Best of Harry Harrison and let them take it from there. I am fairly sure no one will be disappointed."

The collection was also reviewed by Philip Stephensen-Payne] Paperback Parlour, February 1977, Paul McGuire in Delap's F & SF Review, February 1977, Neville Angove in SF Commentary, #57, 1979, and Jim England in Paperback Inferno, Volume 5, Number 4, 1982.
