= In the Stone House =

- Dust-jacket illustration by Allan C. Servoss for In the Stone House
- Author: Barry N. Malzberg
- Cover artist: Allan C. Servoss, design by Martin Hertzel
- Language: English
- Genre: Science fiction, fantasy, horror
- Publisher: Arkham House
- Publication date: 2000
- Publication place: United States
- Media type: Print (hardback)
- Pages: vi, 247
- ISBN: 0-87054-178-1
- OCLC: 44613116
- Dewey Decimal: 813/.54 21
- LC Class: PS3563.A434 I5 2000

In the Stone House is a collection of science fiction, fantasy and horror stories by American writer Barry N. Malzberg. It was released in 2000 and was the author's first book published by Arkham House. It was published in an edition of approximately 2,500 copies. The stories originally appeared in The Magazine of Fantasy and Science Fiction, Omni, Science Fiction Age and other magazines.

== Contents ==
In the Stone House contains the following tales:

- "Heavy Metal"
- "Turpentine"
- "Quartermain"
- "The Prince of the Steppes"
- "Andante Lugubre"
- "Standards & Practices"
- "Darwinian Facts"
- "Allegro Marcato"
- "Something from the Seventies"
- "The High Purpose"
- "All Assassins"
- "Understanding Entropy"
- "Ship Full of Jews"
- "Amos"
- "Improvident Excess"
- "Hitler At Nuremberg"
- "Concerto Accademico"
- "The Intransigents"
- "Hieractic Realignment"
- "The Only Thing You Learn"
- "Police Actions"
- "Fugato"
- "Major League Triceratops"
- "In the Stone House"

== See also ==
- Barry N. Malzberg bibliography

== Sources ==
- Chalker, Jack L.; Mark Owings (2001). The Science-Fantasy Publishers: A Bibliographic History, 1923-1998, Supplement 9. Westminster, MD and Baltimore: Mirage Press, Ltd. p. 5.
- Nielsen, Leon (2004). Arkham House Books: A Collector's Guide. Jefferson, NC and London: McFarland & Company, Inc. p. 145. ISBN 0-7864-1785-4.
