= Samantha Hall =

Samantha Hall may refer to:

- Samantha Hall (scientist) (born 1982), Australian environmental scientist
- Samantha Hall (discus thrower) (born 1993), Jamaican discus thrower

== See also ==
- Sam Hall (disambiguation)
