= Fantasy Book (1981 magazine) =

American fantasy magazine

Cover of the first issue; art by Cathy Hill

Fantasy Book was an American fantasy magazine that was published from 1981 to 1987. The publisher, Dennis Mallonee, declared in the first issue, dated October 1981, that the magazine would include all types of fantasy: "High fantasy, light fantasy, heroic fantasy, horror stories, mystery stories, fairy stories, legends, fables, poems". Science fiction historian Mike Ashley suggests that the first issue, with a humorous cover showing a man shaking hands with a dragon in a sweatshirt, was positioning itself as a successor to Unknown, a highly regarded fantasy pulp magazine from forty years earlier. A variety of stories appeared in the first few issues: Ashley lists Al Sarrantonio's "The Return of Mad Santa", about a world in which Santa Claus has an evil side that occasionally breaks through, as a typical Unknown fantasy, and stories by C. Bruce Hunter, David Kaufman, and Eric G. Iverson as typically of other predecessor fantasy magazines—Weird Tales, Beyond Fantasy Fiction, or a literary fantasy magazine. Science fiction did occasionally appear, such as Lil and Kris Neville's story "Milk into Brandy". It also carried reprints of classic fantasies.

The initial print run of 10,000 sold about 4,175 copies, all through dealers. Nick Smith, the editor, commented in the third issue that the range of fantasy offered might be a problem for the magazine, as fantasy readers might only be interested in particular niches within the genre: "A fantasy magazine that devotes itself to sword-and-sorcery generally doesn't sell to Tolkien fans or Lovecraft fans. A magazine of horror fantasy doesn't sit well with the classicists". The covers usually, but not always, emphasized light fantasy and myth. From March 1984 onwards more horror fiction began to appear. Circulation dropped after the first issue, to about 3,000, of whom only 200 or so were subscribers, and there was little advertising in the magazine to offset the production costs. In March 1987, in the 23rd issue, Mallonee announced that Fantasy Book would cease publication; in the announcement he also said he hoped it would return the following year, but in the event the 23rd issue was the last.

== Bibliographic details ==
Fantasy Book was published by Fantasy Book Enterprises of Pasadena, California, and edited by Nick Smith. It was slick, saddle-stapled, and quarto-sized, with 80 pages for the first 14 issues, and 64 pages thereafter. The price began at $3.00, and went up to $3.95 with issue 14. There were six issues in the first volume; then four in each of the next three volumes, and five in the final volume. It began as a bimonthly but after three issues this slipped to a quarterly schedule which was maintained to the end of the run except for a four-month gap between the August and December 1983 issues.

== Sources ==
- Ashley, Mike (1985). "Fantasy Book (1981-)". In Tymn, Marshall B.; Ashley, Mike (eds.). Science Fiction, Fantasy and Weird Fiction Magazines. Westport, Connecticut: Greenwood Press. pp. 264–266. ISBN 0-3132-1221-X.
- Ashley, Mike (2016). Science Fiction Rebels: The Story of the Science-Fiction Magazines from 1981 to 1990. Liverpool: Liverpool University Press. ISBN 978-1-78138-260-8.
