= The Empty People =

1969 novel by Barry N. Malzberg

- Lancer Books first edition
- Author: Barry N. Malzberg as K. M. O'Donnell
- Cover artist: Howard Winters
- Language: English
- Genre: Science fiction
- Publisher: Lancer Books (original 1969 edition)
- Publication date: 1969
- Publication place: United States
- Media type: Print (Paperback)
- Pages: 159 (Ace Books edition)
- OCLC: 2010364

The Empty People is a science fiction novel by American writer Barry N. Malzberg as "K. M. O'Donnell," first published in 1969 in a paperback edition by Lancer Books.

In the novel, Della suffers through her husband James Archer's brain tumor and an alien invasion. After the invasion, the aliens force James to chase Della across a city populated by deadlike reconstituted people.

== Publication history ==
The Empty People was first published under the pseudonym K. M. O'Donnell in 1969 by Lancer Books. It was translated to German and Italian in 1974.

== Plot summary ==
The novel shifts between an alien invasion and a tumor afflicting James Archer's brain. Della seeks help from a controversial Swiss doctor who they later share an affair. The alien invasion is perceived differently between Della and an amnesiac James Archer who plays a poet. In Della's version, the X'Ching invade by killing all men and abducting the women. In James' version, the Keepers imprison humanity and their memory. In either version, the aliens force them to perform a chase in a New York city. Della is supposed to rescue an unknown individual while James was the Follower. The aliens reconstituted the people they killed to act as backdrop. In an argument, James accidentally killed a reconstituted traffic cop by thrusting a hand through its shoulder causing it to shatter. Meanwhile, a messianic Rogers waits for a vague event while alien tourists join him. James trails Della sleeplessly for six days. They confront each other at the subway, a fascination parlour, and a bar. At the bar, James tries to give Della a couple minute lead but Della begins to rant at him. The reconstituted bartender asks them to leave but James shoots it in the head. Its new head resembles James' and mocks him. Della flees. She arrives at Coney Island but finds the Follower at a soda stand. The Follower chases her to a subway station where she escapes despite spraining her ankle. Later, he trails her to a hotel. At the lobby, James encounters a prosthetic person behind a typewriter. It advises him to think on the solution and he intuits her location. James decides not to kill her. They converse and then find the discrepancies between their respective realities. Rogers and the alien tourists begin to burn. A figure from the fire winks at Rogers and then stabs him. The body of James Archer shifts in the hospital bed but no one notices. As he dies, he understood.

== Reception and legacy ==
In 1970, The Magazine of Fantasy & Science Fiction's Joanna Russ critiqued The Empty People with "a well-written book which I do not understand at all." In 1971, Russ compared it to Leo P. Kelley's Time Rogue citing "perhaps it's only the effect of incoherence interspersed with very good writing." Luna Monthly's Jan Slavin remarked "I have read the book twice, and still it seems to be a couple of short stories that someone cut up page by page and gave to a moron to rearrange." In 1994, Malzberg reflected on his early work "particularly The Empty People or In the Enclosure have the closed, hermetic feel of a Woolrich stalk and a similar mindlessness of unidentifiable but efficient menace." In 2008, Science Fiction Studies's Michael Hemmingson opined "perhaps the weakest of O'Donnell's or Malzberg's work, an early effort by a writer who has not yet found his voice."

In 2013, The Encyclopedia of Science Fiction's Don D'Ammassa noted it "involved the formation of a gestalt personality." In 2014, Science Fiction and Other Suspect Ruminations's Joachem Boaz likened it to Malzberg's later Herovit's World (1973) with "the most convincing interpretation of the novel suggests that the SF elements (purposefully clichéd and vaguely explained) are mere manifestations and torments of a diseased mind."

== See also ==
- Barry N. Malzberg bibliography
