= The Best of Barry N. Malzberg =

1976 collection of science fiction short stories by Barry N. Malzberg

- Cover of first edition
- Author: Barry N. Malzberg
- Cover artist: Robert Schulz
- Language: English
- Series: The Best of ... series
- Genre: Science fiction
- Publisher: Pocket Books
- Publication date: 1976
- Publication place: United States
- Media type: Print (papaerback)
- Pages: xv, 398
- ISBN: 0-671-80256-9
- OCLC: 2084491
- Followed by: The Best of Robert Silverberg

The Best of Barry N. Malzberg is a collection of science fiction short stories by American author Barry N. Malzberg, edited by Adele Leone Hull. It was first published in paperback by Pocket Books in January 1976 as the first volume in its Best of ... series.

== Summary ==
The book contains thirty-eight short works of fiction, together with a general introduction and introductions to each of the stories, by the author. The "Introduction to the Second Edition" is a story, not an introduction (though it has an introduction). The book itself never had a second edition.

== Contents ==
- "Introduction" (1976)
- "A Reckoning" (1973)
- "Letting It All Hang Out" (1974)
- "The Man in the Pocket" (1972)
- "Pater Familias" (with Kris Neville) (1972)
- "Going Down" (1975)
- "Those Wonderful Years" (1973)
- "On Ice" (1973)
- "Revolution" (1973)
- "Ups and Downs" (1973)
- "Bearing Witness" (1973)
- "At the Institute" (1974)
- "Making It Through" (1972)
- "Tapping Out" (1973)
- "Closed Sicilian" (1973)
- "Linkage" (1973)
- "Introduction to the Second Edition" (1973)
- "Trial of the Blood" (1974)
- "Getting Around" (1973)
- "Track Two" (1974)
- "Battered-Earth Syndrome" (1973)
- "Network" (1974)
- "A Delightful Comedic Premise" (1974)
- "Geraniums" (1973)
- "City Lights, City Nights" (1973)
- "Culture Lock" (1973)
- "As in a Vision Apprehended" (1974)
- "Form in Remission" (1974)
- "Opening Fire" (1973)
- "Running Around" (1973)
- "Overlooking" (1974)
- "Twenty Sixty-one" (1974)
- "Closing the Deal" (1974)
- "What the Board Said" (1976)
- "Uncoupling" (1975)
- "Over the Line" (1974)
- "Try Again" (1974)
- "An Oversight" (1974)
- "And Still in the Darkness" (1976)

== Reception ==
The book was reviewed by R. Laurraine Tutihasi in Luna Monthly #64, Summer 1976.
