= The Best of Jack Vance =

1976 collection of science fiction short stories by Jack Vance

- Cover of first edition
- Author: Jack Vance
- Cover artist: Charles Moll
- Language: English
- Series: The Best of ... series
- Genre: Science fiction
- Publisher: Pocket Books
- Publication date: 1976
- Publication place: United States
- Media type: Print (paperback)
- Pages: x, 274
- ISBN: 0-671-80510-X
- OCLC: 2755582
- Preceded by: The Best of Mack Reynolds
- Followed by: The Best of Harry Harrison

The Best of Jack Vance is a collection of science fiction short stories by American author Jack Vance, edited by Adele Leone Hull. It was first published in paperback by Pocket Books in May 1976 as the fifth volume in its Best of ... series, and reprinted in August 1979 and May 1982 by the same publisher. The first hardcover edition was issued by Taplinger in August 1978. The book has been translated into German.

== Summary ==
The book contains six novelettes and novellas, together with a preface by the author, an introduction by fellow science fiction writer Barry N. Malzberg, and introductory notes on the individual stories by the author.

== Contents ==
- "Preface to the Collection"
- "Capturing Vance" [introduction] (Barry N. Malzberg)
- "Sail 25" (1962)
- "Ullward's Retreat" (1958)
- "The Last Castle" (1966)
- "Abercrombie Station" (1952)
- "The Moon Moth" (1961)
- "Rumfuddle" (1973)

== Awards ==
The book placed eighth in the 1977 Locus Poll Award for Best Single Author Collection.

== Reception ==
The book was reviewed by Robert Chilson in Delap's F & SF Review, September 1976, Taras Wolansky in Science Fiction & Fantasy Book Review, October 1979, Bob Mecoy in Future Life, December 1979, Marcel Bieger in SF Perry Rhodan Magazin, Mai 1981, and anonymously in Reclams Science Fiction Führer, 1982.
