= Pocket Books's Best of ... series =

The first volume, published in Jan. 1976

The Best of ... is a series of speculative fiction collections originally published in paperback by Pocket Books from 1976 to 1982.

== History ==
The series purported to gather together the career-best short works of a selection of authors then prominent in the field. It was conceived and its first eight volumes acquired by Robert Gleason, Pocket Books' science fiction editor in the early 1970s. After he was fired in 1974 the project was inherited by his assistant Adele Leone Hull, who edited the books and commissioned introductions by Barry N. Malzberg. The set was released from January through September, 1976. In 1980 the project was revived, with four additional volumes issued from May 1980 through February 1982; the last two books appeared under David G. Hartwell's Timescape Books imprint. Reprints of a few of the earlier volumes were also issued.

== Content ==
The first eight volumes included laudatory introductions by Barry N. Malzberg, who was himself highlighted in the initial collection. Individual authors provided introductions to the stories themselves, and occasionally their own introductory essays.

== The series ==
Author and publication date follow each title.

- The Best of Barry N. Malzberg (Barry N. Malzberg) (Jan. 1976)
- The Best of Robert Silverberg (Robert Silverberg) (Feb. 1976)
- The Best of Keith Laumer (Keith Laumer) (Mar. 1976)
- The Best of Mack Reynolds (Mack Reynolds) (Apr. 1976)
- The Best of Jack Vance (Jack Vance) (May 1976)
- The Best of Harry Harrison (Harry Harrison) (Jun. 1976)
- The Best of Poul Anderson (Poul Anderson) (Aug. 1976)
- The Best of Damon Knight (Damon Knight) (Sep. 1976)
- The Best of Walter M. Miller, Jr. (Walter M. Miller Jr.) (May 1980)
- The Best of John Sladek (John Sladek) (Jan. 1981)
- The Best of Randall Garrett (Randall Garrett) (Jan. 1982)
- The Best of Wilson Tucker (Wilson Tucker) (Feb. 1982)

== Comparable series ==
A number of contemporary series were issued by other publishers, also made up of individual volumes covering the works of single authors. DAW Books published The Book of [author's name] starting in 1972. Ballantine Books (later Del Rey Books) published its own "Best of" series from 1974 to 1988. Ace Books published The Worlds of [author's name] series from 1966-1983
