= Best SF: 1968 =

- First edition cover
- Editors: Harry Harrison and Brian W. Aldiss
- Language: English
- Series: Best SF
- Genre: Science fiction
- Publisher: Sphere Books
- Publication date: 1969
- Publication place: United States
- Media type: Print (hardback & paperback)
- Pages: 207
- ISBN: 0-7221-4335-4
- OCLC: 226174718
- Preceded by: Best SF: 1967
- Followed by: Best SF: 1969

Best SF: 1968 (also known as Best Science Fiction 1968 or The Year's Best Science Fiction No. 2) is the second in the Best SF series edited by Harry Harrison and Brian W. Aldiss, first published in a British edition in January 1969 by Sphere Books. The first American (and first hardcover) edition was released later that year by Putnam, with a Berkley paperback following shortly thereafter. Severn House issued a British hardcover edition in 1977.

== Background ==
Stories were selected from the magazines Analog Science Fiction / Science Fact, Galaxy Science Fiction, The Magazine of Fantasy & Science Fiction, New Worlds, Playboy, and others. Among the authors are Isaac Asimov, Fritz Leiber, John D. MacDonald, J. R. Pierce, Mack Reynolds, Bob Shaw, Robert Sheckley, Robert Silverberg, and Theodore Sturgeon.

== Contents ==
- Introduction to Best SF: 1968 (1969) by Harry Harrison
- "Budget Planet" (1968) by Robert Sheckley
- "Appointment on Prila" (1968) by Bob Shaw
- "Lost Ground" (1966) by David I. Masson
- "The Rime of the Ancient SF Author, or Conventions and Recollections" (1968) by J. R. Pierce
- "The Annex" (1968) by John D. MacDonald
- "Segregationist" (1967) by Isaac Asimov
- "Final War" (1968) by K. M. O'Donnell
- "2001: A Space Odyssey–Some Selected Reviews" (1969) by Lester del Rey, Samuel R. Delany, and Ed Emshwiller
- "Apeman, Spaceman—or, 2001's Answer to the World's Riddle" (1969) by Leon E. Stover
- "The Serpent of Kundalini" (1968) by Brian W. Aldiss
- "Golden Acres" (1967) by Kit Reed
- "Criminal in Utopia" (1968) by Mack Reynolds
- "One Station of the Way" (1968) by Fritz Leiber
- "Sweet Dreams, Melissa" (1968) by Stephen Goldin
- "To the Dark Star" (1968) by Robert Silverberg
- "Like Young" (1960) by Theodore Sturgeon
- "The House That Jules Built" (1969) by Brian W. Aldiss

== Reception ==
In 1969, Publishers' Weekly's Barbara A. Bannon called it "a must for SF readers." In its paperback edition, Publishers' Weekly's Leonore Fleischer opined "We find it difficult to keep up with all the annual anthologies of science-fiction claiming "best" in their titles. So we'll just tell you that this one contains the usual number of impressive names." Cosmos: A Science-Fantasy Review's Geoffrey Giles wrote "At today's rising prices, considering you are getting the cream of the year's crop gathered from all sides, these 207 pages are excellent value for money—probably the best buy on the market." Analog Science Fiction / Science Fact's P. Schuyler Miller appraised it as "down a notch in my estimation from last year's. I think it's the effect of the "New Wave," which finds virtue in incoherence for confusion's sake." In 1970, The Magazine of Fantasy & Science Fiction's Joanna Russ said Best SF: 1968 was "a fair mixed bag of stories framed by an Introduction and Afterword that indirectly—and unfortunately—lead one to expect more from the stories than they manage to give."
