= Final War (short story) =

- Short story by Barry N. Malzberg as K. M. O'Donnell
- Title page of "Final War" as it appeared in The Magazine of Fantasy & Science Fiction, April 1968.
- Country: United States
- Language: English
- Genre: Science fiction

Publication
- Published in: The Magazine of Fantasy & Science Fiction
- Publication type: Digest
- Publisher: Mercury Press, Inc.
- Media type: Print
- Publication date: April 1968

"Final War" is a short story by American author Barry N. Malzberg under the pseudonym K. M. O'Donnell. It was first published in the April 1968 issue of The Magazine of Fantasy & Science Fiction.

== Background ==
Barry N. Malzberg used the pseudonym K. M. O'Donnell. He lived in Manhattan and was 28 years old. Malzberg followed the sports news and found the headlines strange. These headlines inspired "Final War". In February 1965, Malzberg wrote "Final War". The Atlantic Monthly, Esquire, The Kenyon Review, and Playboy rejected it. "Final War" was sold to The Magazine of Fantasy & Science Fiction on October 1, 1967.

== Publication history ==
"Final War" was first published under the pseudonym K. M. O'Donnell in the April 1968 issue of The Magazine of Fantasy & Science Fiction. It reappeared in the books The Best from Fantasy and Science Fiction: Eighteenth Series (1969) edited by Edward L. Ferman, Best SF: 1968 or The Year's Best Science Fiction No. 2 (1969) edited by Brian W. Aldiss and Harry Harrison, Final War and Other Fantasies (1969); The Future Now (1977) edited by Robert Hoskins; Malzberg at Large (1979) and The Many Worlds of Barry Malzberg (1975).

== Plot ==
Two factions fight a battle on an enormous estate. One side defends the forest while the other attacks and vice versa. The story is told from three members of one side: Hastings, the Captain, and the First Sergeant. Hastings requests convalescent leave from Headquarters so he may leave the battle, which has become monotonous but is repeatedly ignored by the new Captain who he believes is insane. The new Captain says he cannot accept requests until he is properly acclimatised. On election day, bomber airplanes are dispatched. However, they drop bombs on their side instead of the enemy. The survivors take over the forest. A few remain in the forest. The new Captain orders their executions, but an enemy airplane bombs the forest, killing them. Hastings rereads his letter for convalescent leave, which relates his frustrations. Previously, he wrote another letter to the old captain, who also rebuffed his request. When Hastings asks the First Sergeant, he says the Captain is preparing a new speech. Hastings sends his request to the First Sergeant to give to Headquarters but says it has to be written in code. When Hastings asks for the codebook, the First Sergeant hands him his notes for his autobiographical novel. Hastings decides to hand the new Captain his request in the middle of his upcoming speech. The new Captain calls the company into formation. He tells them they may not feel like the battle means anything anymore, but all that will change. He says the limited action they're in is now an all-out war. Hastings stabs the new Captain with a bayonet. The perspective shifts to the new Captain. He blames Hastings for the troop's low morale. The Captain ignores his requests because he does not want Hastings in an asylum. When one of Hastings' requests is received, a Corporal arrives. The Captain tells him Hastings has died. The Captain decides to kill Hastings after his speech to raise morale. Instead, Hastings stabs him. The POV shifts to the First Sergeant. The First Sergeant hates both Hastings and the Captain. The First Sergeant is in charge of sending and receiving communiques from Headquarters. Hastings and the new Captain bother him too much for the First Sergeant to do it properly. He destroys the radio equipment and writes the communiques himself. Neither the Captain nor Hastings noticed the difference. He wonders if he did wrong and decides he is right.

== Reception ==
"Final War" was six votes away from winning the 1968 Nebula Award for Best Novelette. In 1968, The Magazine of Fantasy & Science Fiction editor Edward L. Ferman said "Final War" "takes the glamour out [of war], and does it brilliantly." In 1969, Science Fiction Review's Richard E. Geis reviewed Best SF: 1968 and noted it was "good, a sort of Vietnam Catch-22, macabre and insane." Analog Science Fiction / Science Fact's P. Schuyler Miller critiqued "To me, the inane confusion of the senseless, overformalized "war" of the future is overdone and merely compounds the point that war—any war—is nonsense. But who is to say that is not precisely the author's intent—to hammer the point home just as heavy-handedly as he can?" Later reviewing The Best from Fantasy and Science Fiction: Eighteenth Series, he called it "much anthologized." In 1970, The Magazine of Fantasy & Science Fiction's Joanna Russ found it "quite good." In 2018, Rich Horton declared it "a very funny story, albeit very blackly funny, and its anti-war attitude is much more general than simply anti-Vietnam. It seems to resemble Catch-22 more than anything, I would say."

== See also ==
- Barry N. Malzberg bibliography
