= Marshall Hall (physiologist) =

English physician and physiologist (1790–1857)

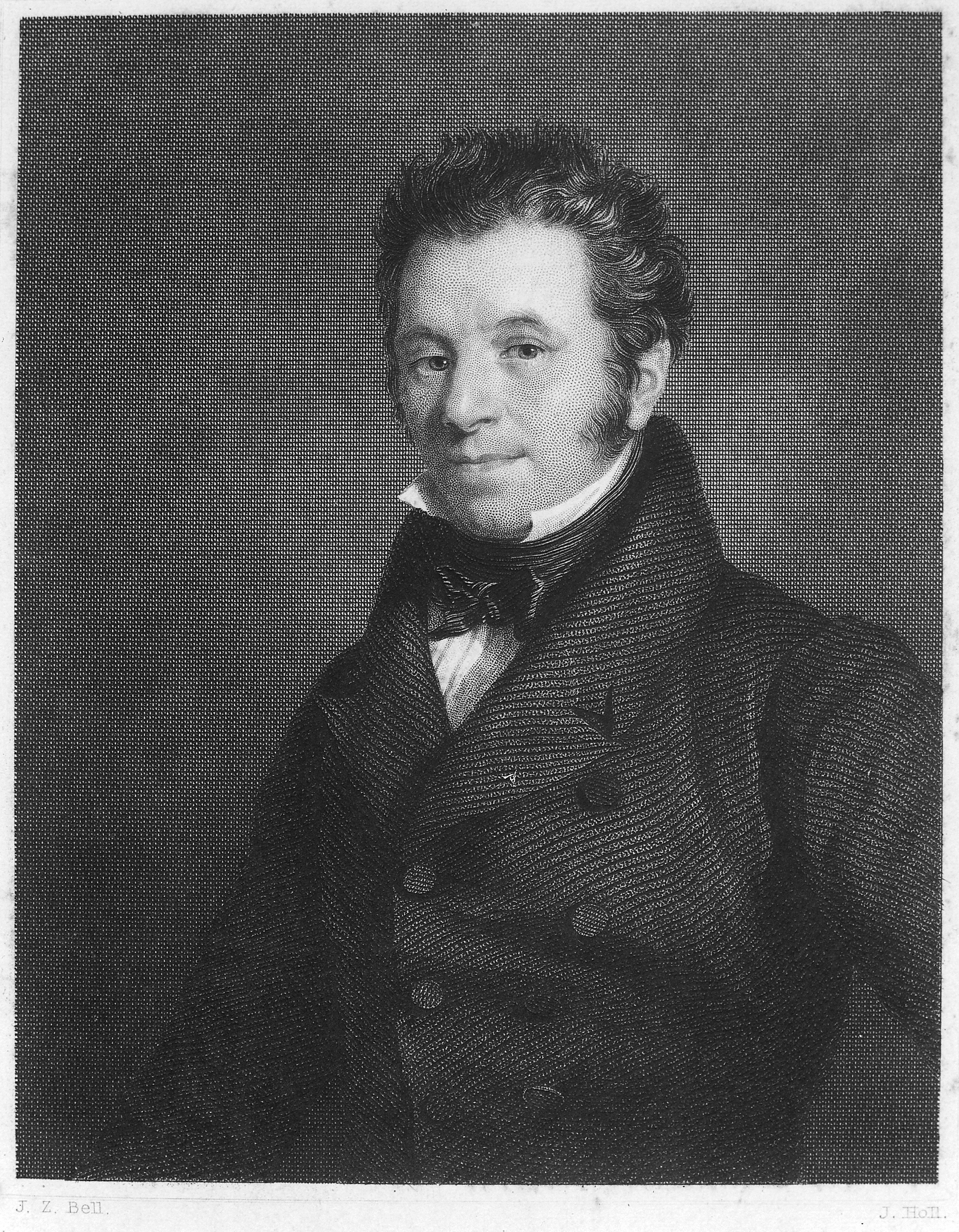
- Born: 18 February 1790; Basford, Nottingham
- Died: 11 August 1857 (aged 67); Brighton
- Scientific career
- Fields: Medicine, Physiology, Angiology, Anatomy, Pathology, Therapeutics,

Marshall Hall FRS (18 February 1790 – 11 August 1857) was an English physician, physiologist and early neurologist. His name is attached to the theory of reflex arc mediated by the spinal cord, to a method of resuscitation of drowned people, and to the elucidation of function of capillary vessels.

== Biography ==
Hall was born on 18 February 1790 at Basford, near Nottingham, England, where his father, Robert Hall, was a cotton manufacturer. He was a brother of the inventor Samuel Hall. Having attended the Rev. J. Blanchard's academy at Nottingham, he entered a chemists shop at Newark-on-Trent, and in 1809 began to study medicine at Edinburgh University. In 1811 he was elected senior president of the Royal Medical Society; the following year he took the M.D. degree, and was immediately appointed resident house physician to the Edinburgh Royal Infirmary. This appointment he resigned after two years, when he visited Paris and its medical schools, and, on a walking tour, those also of Berlin and Göttingen.

In 1817, when he settled at Nottingham, he published his Diagnosis, and in 1818 he wrote the Mimoses, a work on the affections denominated bilious, nervous, &c. The next year he was elected a fellow of the Royal Society of Edinburgh, and in 1825 he became physician to the Nottingham general hospital. In 1826 he removed to London, and in the following year he published his Commentaries on the More Important Diseases of Females.

In 1835 (Principles of Investigation in Physiology), he outlined five principles to govern animal experimentation.

1. An experiment should never be performed if the necessary information could be obtained by observations
2. No experiment should be performed without a clearly defined and obtainable, objective
3. Scientists should be well-informed about the work of their predecessors and peers to avoid unnecessary repetition of an experiment
4. Justifiable experiments should be carried out with the least possible infliction of suffering (often through the use of lower, less sentient animals)
5. Every experiment should be performed under circumstances that would provide the clearest possible results, thereby diminishing the need for repetition of experiments.

In 1836 he issued his Observations on Blood-letting Founded on Researches on the Morbid and Curative Effects of Loss of Blood, denouncing the widespread practice of bloodletting, which was acknowledged by the medical profession to be of vast practical value, and in 1831 his Experimental Essay on the Circulation of the Blood in the Capillary Vessels, in which he was the first to show that the capillaries are intermediate channels between the arteries and the veins and put the blood in contact with biological tissues. In the following year he read before the Royal Society a paper On the Inverse Ratio which Subsists between Respiration and Irritability in the Animal Kingdom.

His most important work in physiology was concerned with the theory of reflex action, embodied in a paper On the Reflex Function of the Medulla Oblongata and the Medulla Spinalis (1833), which was supplemented in 1837 by another On the True Spinal Marrow, and the Excito-motor System of Nerves. In this theory, he stated that the spinal cord is comprised by a chain of units that functions as an independent reflex arcs, and their activity integrates sensory and motor nerves at the segment of the spinal cord from which these nerves originate. He proposed in addition that those arcs are interconnected and interacting in the production of coordinated movement.

The reflex function excited great attention on the continent of Europe, though in England some of his papers were refused publication by the Royal Society. Hall thus became the authority on the multiform deranged states of health referable to an abnormal condition of the nervous system, and he gained a large practice.

Hall also published books on neurological diseases including stroke (apoplexy) and epilepsy.

In Asphyxia, its Rationale and its Remedy (1856), Hall developed a technique for preventing victims of drowning by freeing their respiratory airway and by providing immediate ventilation, as the initial steps in resuscitation.

He was elected as a member to the American Philosophical Society in 1853.

He died at Brighton of a throat infection, aggravated by lecturing, on 11 August 1857 and was buried in Nottingham. One of his grandsons was the musician Marshall Hall.

== Religious views ==
Hall was a devout Christian who believed in the divinity of Christ. A collection of his religious thoughts on his journals and letters was collected by his widow in the biographical book Memoirs of Marshall Hall, by his widow. There, he is quoted speaking about Christ:

To meditate on Him who is my Saviour – to be, to live in Him – is to me the supreme good. In such a place would I accomplish my projected work, and await His coming! In our tour [to Switzerland] we have seen much of the mockery of religion... Not so is Christ. His doctrine is sure, simple, cordial, spiritual. I believe His words, I do His will, I wait for, look for His coming. This is the Alpha and the Omega of the truth of Christ

—

In his treatise On the diseases and derangements of the nervous system (1841), he evoked the design argument, stating about the physiological activity of the body:

In all this, I admire the hand of Him who fashioneth all things after His own will; in all this I see design, power, creation! As one mighty principle pervades, and rules throughout the wide universe, so one principle (I dare not call it less than mighty) rules in the microcosm of each animated being !

—

== Abolitionism ==
Hall was also an abolitionist. When he travelled to the United States, in his later years, he was shocked by what he saw, and was shocked at how slavery was sanctioned in the States. An admirer of William Wilberforce, he wrote The two-fold slavery of the United States; with a project of self-emancipation (1854), where he denounced the slave system and spoke about "a second slavery" of racial prejudice. He set then his opinion on slavery, stating:

I have ceased to regard the emancipation of the negro and the abolition of slavery as a choice. I am compelled to regard them as a necessity. It remains, therefore, to devise such a plan of emancipation and abolition as shall be wise, just, and practicable.

—

In his book, he proposed as project of emancipation that African-American people continue to produce cotton, sugar and rice, but to freely help and prosper themselves. On the same religious grounds, he questioned the permission of polygamy in the US and insisted that imposing the slavery system and denying marriage to black people was a sin which caused a "deprivation of education, of holy marriage, of parental rights".:

Let education, discipline, a pure and holy religion, just rewards, and just punishments, do their work. Let us free, and raise, and guide the poor negro, and God will bless us in our good work; and let us remember that in emancipating him from his yoke, we really emancipate our country, and ourselves and our children from a yoke still more galling and fearful. As slavery is assuredly the dark spot on the United States, the absence of marriage – such marriage as is holy and indissoluble – is the dark spot on slavery. It is a national sin. It is a sin in all that are in any wise partakers in it – in the master more even than in the slave. It is not possible during such a state of things to avoid the dreadful denunciations of Holy Scripture against it. He therefore who deliberately, from whatever motive, sanctions slavery in the United States as it is, as deliberately renounces the religion of Christ ! I cannot say less, and more fearful words cannot be written.

—

He believed that every slaveholder had a "guilt of sin against God, and of sin against his fellow-man" and insisted that there was no credible hypothesis to rationally support white supremacy, stating:

No hypothesis of difference of origin, race or species, or by whatever other name it may be named, can take from the African people that which they have nobly earned for themselves, a well-founded reputation – for gratitude, fidelity, loyalty, of all which truthful biography and history record innumerable instances; – for ability in commerce, in the useful arts, in agriculture, of which living instances abound; – for mathematics; for music and eloquence; and for military genius, and political ability and integrity.

—
