= Passengers (short story) =

- Short story by Robert Silverberg
- Title page as it appeared in Orbit 4 (1968) edited by Damon Knight.
- Country: United States
- Language: English
- Genre: Science fiction

Publication
- Published in: Orbit 4
- Publication type: Hardcover
- Publisher: G. P. Putnam's Sons
- Media type: Print
- Publication date: 1968

"Passengers" is a science fiction short story by American writer Robert Silverberg. It was nominated for the Hugo Award for Best Short Story 1970, and won the Nebula Award for Best Short Story in 1969.

== Background ==
In the 1970 collection The Cube Root of Uncertainty, Silverberg wrote in the Introduction: "Grim tales include "Passengers" and "Sundance". It is told in the first person present tense.

== Publication history ==
"Passengers" was first published in the 1968 book Orbit 4 edited by Damon Knight. It reappeared in The Best from Orbit (1975), The Best of Robert Silverberg, vol. 1 (1976), The Cube Root of Uncertainty (1970), Moonferns and Starsongs (1971), and Nebula Award Stories Five (1970).

== Plot summary ==
The story is set in the year 1987. For three years, people on Earth have been subject to the will of the "Passengers"—intangible beings who usurp human bodies temporarily and without warning, and do nothing but play and cause havoc. People being "ridden" are ignored by others, and when they are freed, the experience, by social convention, is ignored by all. When the Passenger leaves the host body, the person is left with no memories of his time being ridden.

The story is narrated by a man who wakes up after a three-day ride. Unusually, he recalls what has taken place: a random sexual encounter with a woman, also being ridden at the time. By chance, he encounters her just a few hours after her Passenger has left her. Fighting against the pervasive pessimism of the world (people tend to avoid relationships, as one can be taken by a Passenger at any moment), he tries to connect with his fellow victim. Just as he begins to win her trust, he is again taken by a Passenger and driven into a nearby bar, where he meets a man and leaves the bar with him.

== Reception ==
In 1971, SF Commentary's Barry Gillam called it "Silverberg's best story to date." In 1972, Vector's John Bowles praised "[i]t is perfectly sustained, very carefully and well written [...], and is utterly inexorable."

== Sources, references, external links, quotations ==
- Passengers title listing at the Internet Speculative Fiction Database
