= The Best of Randall Garrett =

- Cover of first edition
- Editor: Robert Silverberg
- Cover artist: Rowena Morrill
- Language: English
- Genre: Science fiction, fantasy short stories
- Publisher: Timescape/Pocket Books
- Publication date: 1982
- Publication place: United States
- Media type: Print (Paperback)
- Pages: 261 pp
- ISBN: 0-671-83574-2
- Preceded by: The Best of John Sladek
- Followed by: The Best of Wilson Tucker

The Best of Randall Garrett is a collection of writings by American science fiction and fantasy author Randall Garrett and others, edited by Robert Silverberg. It was first published in paperback by Pocket Books's Timescape imprint in January 1982 as the eleventh volume in its Best of ... series.

== Summary ==
The book contains short works of fiction and poetry by the author alternating with tribute essays by fellow science fiction writers, together with an introduction by the editor.

== Contents ==
- "Introduction" (Robert Silverberg)
- "The Man Who Came for Christmas" (Philip José Farmer)
- "The Hunting Lodge" (Randall Garrett)
- "Randall" (Marion Zimmer Bradley)
- "The Waiting Game" (Randall Garrett)
- "Randall and I" (Isaac Asimov)
- "Isaac Asimov's The Caves of Steel: A Review in Verse" (Randall Garrett)
- "Alfred Bester's The Demolished Man: A Review in Verse" (Randall Garrett)
- "Of Pastiche and Parody" (Poul Anderson)
- "Poul Anderson's Three Hearts and Three Lions: A Calypso in Search of a Rhyme" (Randall Garrett)
- "How I Stole the Belt Civilization" (Larry Niven)
- "No Connections" (Randall Garrett)
- "Randall Garrett - Big-Heart" (Ben Bova)
- "The Best Policy" (Randall Garrett)
- "How Randall Garrett Changed World History" (Norman Spinrad)
- "Time Fuze" (Randall Garrett)
- "Randall Garrett" (Frank Herbert)
- "A Little Intelligence" (Robert Silverberg and Randall Garrett, as by Robert Randall)
- "Randall Garrett" (Anne McCaffrey)
- "The Eyes Have It" (Randall Garrett)
- "Randall, Harry and John" (Harry Harrison)
- "The Spell of War" (Randall Garrett)
- "Morgen Rot" (Gordon R. Dickson)
- "Frost and Thunder" (Randall Garrett)

== Reception ==
David R. Dunham reviewed The Best of Randall Garrett for Different Worlds magazine and stated that "Best of only has two Darcy stories, one of which is also contained in Murder and Magic, but I found the other one, 'The Spell of War', to be especially interesting since it applies magic to the battlefield. The non-Darcy stories in Best of are good, too."

The collection was also reviewed by Chris Henderson in Dragon Magazine, March 1982, Paul O. Williams (1982) in Science Fiction & Fantasy Book Review #3, April 1982, Roger C. Schlobin in Fantasy Newsletter #48, June 1982, Algis Budrys in The Magazine of Fantasy & Science Fiction, August 1982, and Ann Collier in Vector 111, 1982.
