= The Cube Root of Uncertainty =

Collection of short stories by Robert Silverberg

- First edition
- Author: Robert Silverberg
- Cover artist: Anthony Sini
- Language: English
- Genre: Science fiction
- Publisher: Macmillan Publishing
- Publication date: 1970
- Publication place: United States
- Media type: Print (hardback & paperback)
- Pages: 239
- OCLC: 67672

The Cube Root of Uncertainty is a collection of science fiction short stories by American writer Robert Silverberg, published in hardcover by Macmillan in 1970 and issued in paperback by Collier Books in 1971. No further editions have been issued.

== Contents ==
- "Introduction"
- "Passengers" (Orbit 4 1968)
- "Double Dare" (Galaxy 1956)
- "The Sixth Palace" (Galaxy 1965)
- "Translation Error" (Astounding 1959)
- "The Shadow of Wings" (If 1963)
- "Absolutely Inflexible" (Fantastic Universe 1956)
- "The Iron Chancellor" (Galaxy 1958)
- "MUgwump Four" (Galaxy 1959)
- "To the Dark Star" (The Farthest Reaches 1968)
- "Neighbor" (Galaxy 1964)
- "Halfway House" (If 1966)
- "Sundance" (F&SF 1969)

"Passengers" won the Nebula Award for Best Short Story and was nominated for the Hugo Award.

== Reception ==
Joanna Russ gave the collection a mixed review, noting its division between early work ("Old Silverberg is an idiot") and more recent efforts ("New Silverberg is something else: a highly colored, gloomy, melodramatic, morally allegorical writer who luxuriates in lush description and has a real love of calamity"). She noted that even the better stories were marked by "the sophomoric dark doom that most of us -- far less technically expert -- dealt with during our apprenticeships."
