= Segregationist (short story) =

Short story by Isaac Asimov

"Segregationist" is a science fiction short story by American writer Isaac Asimov. The story was written in April 1967 and was first published in December 1967 in Abbottempo, a magazine produced by Abbott Laboratories. It was reprinted in the October 1968 issue of The Magazine of Fantasy and Science Fiction, and subsequently included in the collections Nightfall and Other Stories (1969), The Complete Robot (1982) and Robot Visions (1990).

== Plot summary ==
The story depicts a future where robotic prosthetics for humans and artificially created organic body-parts for robots (known as Metallos) are commonplace. Metallos have been granted equal status with 'normal' humans.

A man, who has been granted the right to long life (possibly immortality) by an official Board of Mortality, meets the surgeon who is to assist in the performance of heart replacement surgery on the man. The surgeon offers him a choice between a metallic or fibrous cyber-heart. The man stubbornly refuses the doctor's attempts to persuade him to accept a fibrous heart, saying that it's "weak," as compared to a metal heart.

Later, the surgeon remarks to a medical engineer that he would rather that humans and robots stick to being what they are instead of becoming similar. The engineer calls such talk "segregationist", to which the surgeon replies that he "doesn't care." At the end of the story, the surgeon is revealed to be a robot himself.

== Reception ==
In 1969, Analog Science Fiction / Science Fact's P. Schuyler Miller called it "a beautifully tricky little short-short." In 1970, The Magazine of Fantasy & Science Fiction's Joanna Russ reviewed Best SF: 1968 "[i]t leans toward the obvious and toward stories which have one good, clear, conventional idea" counting "Segregationist" among them.
