= To the Dark Star =

- Short story by Robert Silverberg
- Title page of "To the Dark Star" as it appeared in The Farthest Reaches, 1968.
- Country: United States
- Language: English
- Genre: Science fiction

Publication
- Published in: The Farthest Reaches
- Publication type: Hardcover
- Publisher: Trident Press
- Media type: Print
- Publication date: 1968

"To the Dark Star" is a short story by American author Robert Silverberg. It was first published in the 1968 book The Farthest Reaches edited by Joseph Elder.

== Background ==
It is told in the first person present tense.

== Publication history ==
"To the Dark Star" was first published in the 1968 book The Farthest Reaches edited by Joseph Elder. It reappeared in Best SF: 1968 or The Year's Best Science Fiction No. 2 (1969) edited by Harry Harrison and Brian W. Aldiss, The Cube Root of Uncertainty (1970), and Earth's Other Shadow (1973).

== Plot ==
An adapted female, a human male, and a microcephalon arrive at the dark star. The microcephalon is a grey alien with almost no head and greasy skin. They were selected randomly. Miranda, the adapted female, points to the dark star. It glows dark red and throbs black against crimson. She says the surface is 900 degrees, which means no chance for a physical landing. She invites the human male to try though. The microcephalon notes they will use the crawler for inspection. The human male asks Miranda for figures. She tells him to read her report which will be published early next year. He berates her. She asks him for the mass-density curve totals. He tells her they're not ready. She accuses him of lying. He wants to fight her. The microcephalon reappears. It displays no emotion. He loathes it. It probably loathes him too. The dark star is close to collapsing. One of them has to volunteer to monitor it. Miranda and the human male volunteer each other. The microcephalon suggests drawing lots but Miranda accuses him of rigging the results. He recommends voting but Miranda and him nominate each other. A thousand years ago Einstein and Schwarzchild outlined what would happen. When matter reaches a high enough density, the curvature of space closes around it. When it cools close to zero, the mass reaches nil volume and infinite density. It disappears from the universe. They must select an observer. Miranda drugs his food. He looks at his hand and sees the dark star. Miranda tells him to go. He follows her. He sees the devil inside and collapses. She tries to put him inside. He wiggles away and refuses to go. She gives up. Later, he uses a hypnoprobe to persuade her. It almost works. She confronts him. The human male asks if she drugged his food. They wrestle. The microcephalon announces the star is collapsing. They put the alien in the capsule. They launch the crawler. Miranda and the human male watch via video. It watches without fear and records its final moments. The screens go dark. The crawler disappears. Miranda opens the hatch. The microcephalon sits at the console. They return to their homeworlds. Miranda and the human male no longer hate each other. The human male rationalizes his choice. Miranda and him were humans. The microcephalon was not. Miranda smiles. The microcephalon does not talk.

== Reception ==
In 1969, Analog Science Fiction / Science Fact's P. Schuyler Miller noted "To the Dark Star" "a parable of the inhumanity of human beings." In 1970, The Magazine of Fantasy & Science Fiction's Joanna Russ opined "To the Dark Star" "hangs a lot of bizarrerie on a very slender thread; it seems oddly gratuitous, as if the author had finished the story before he decided what its theme was." In 1971, SF Commentary's Barry Gillam appraised "[a] fine story." In 1972, Vector's John Bowles compared it to "Halfway House" (1966) as "just as bleak."
