= The Best of Wilson Tucker =

1982 collection of science fiction short stories by Wilson Tucker

- Cover of first edition
- Author: Wilson Tucker
- Language: English
- Series: The Best of ... series
- Genre: Science fiction
- Publisher: Timescape/Pocket Books
- Publication date: 1982
- Publication place: United States
- Media type: Print (paperback)
- Pages: 191
- ISBN: 0-671-83243-3
- OCLC: 8181417
- Preceded by: The Best of Randall Garrett

The Best of Wilson Tucker is a collection of science fiction short stories by American author Wilson Tucker. It was first published in paperback by Pocket Books's Timescape imprint in February 1982 as the twelfth and last volume in its Best of ... series.

== Summary ==
The book contains nine short stories, novelettes and novellas by the author.

== Contents ==
- "To the Tombaugh Station" (1960)
- "To a Ripe Old Age" (1952)
- "King of the Planet" (1959)
- "Exit" (1943)
- "The Tourist Trade" (1951)
- "My Brother's Wife" (1951)
- "The Job Is Ended" (1950)
- "Able to Zebra" (1953)
- "Time Exposures" (1971)

== Reception ==
The book was reviewed by Martin Morse Wooster in Science Fiction & Fantasy Book Review #4, May 1982.
