= Galaxies (novel) =

1975 novel by Barry Malzberg

- First edition
- Author: Barry Malzberg
- Publisher: Pyramid Books
- Publication date: 1975

Galaxies is a science fiction novel written by Barry N. Malzberg. It was first published in 1975. Galaxies is a metafictional work in which the writing of a science fiction novel becomes entwined with the novel being written.

Malzberg expanded his short work A Galaxy Called Rome into the full-length novel Galaxies.
