= Beyond Apollo =

1972 novel by Barry N. Malzberg

- First edition cover
- Author: Barry N. Malzberg
- Cover artist: Roger Hane
- Language: English
- Genre: Science fiction
- Publisher: Random House (original 1972 edition) & Pocket Books (1974 paperback edition)
- Publication date: 1972
- Publication place: United States
- Media type: Print (hardback & paperback)
- Pages: 156 (Pocket Books edition)
- ISBN: 0-671-77687-8 (1974 paperback)
- OCLC: 20792274

Beyond Apollo is a science fiction novel by American writer Barry N. Malzberg, first published in 1972 in a hardcover edition by Random House. Malzberg credits the inspiration for the novel to "I Have My Vigil", a 1969 short story by fellow science fiction writer Harry Harrison.

== Plot summary ==
The novel's protagonist is Harry M. Evans, the lone survivor of the disastrous first crewed expedition to the planet Venus. Evans provides details of the doomed expedition as a novel in progress, and he proves to be a remarkably unreliable narrator, constantly changing the particulars of his story as it progresses. It quickly becomes apparent to the reader that he may be completely insane, as a feeling of deep (and comical) paranoia underlies Evans's descriptions of the absurd conversations that ensue with the Venusian inhabitants. There is some indication that Evans could very well have murdered his fellow crewmember. The novel ends with a publishing house offering to purchase the rights to Evans's outlandish tale.

== Literary significance and criticism ==
Like much of Malzberg's work, Beyond Apollo was extremely controversial at the time of its publication, receiving both praise and scorn from literary critics.

Joanna Russ praised the novel as "a passionate, fine, completely realized work," noting that Malzberg's repetitive use of particular words transformed them into "a kind of Greek chorus, a terrible, poignant insistence on something that is not quite in the story but yet comes through the story." Harlan Ellison commented that "Beyond Apollo put me out of commission for three days after reading it".

On the other hand, Bob Shaw said in Foundation, "Malzberg's Beyond Apollo is, to me, the epitome of everything that has gone wrong with sf in the last ten years or so".

The novel won the first John W. Campbell Memorial Award for Best Science Fiction Novel, presented in 1973.

== See also ==
- Barry N. Malzberg bibliography
