= Samuel Hall (inventor) =

English inventor and engineer (1782–1863)

Samuel Hall (baptised 1782 – 21 November 1863) was an English inventor and engineer.

== Life ==
Hall was the eldest son of Robert Hall, (Note: Rather than the second son as stated by others. The discrepancy would arise from a misinterpreting of Felkin, "..two eminently gifted sons, Samuel and Marshall Hall," "The younger son, Marshall," "The second son, Samuel," "... third brother, Mr. Lawrence Hall,") a cotton manufacturer and bleacher, of Basford, Nottingham, where he was baptised on 17 March 1782. He was an elder brother of Marshall Hall, the physiologist. He took out patents in 1817 and 1823 for gassing lace and net, which consisted in passing the fabric rapidly through a row of gas flames, all the loose fibres being thus removed without damage to the lace. The process exercised an important influence upon the lace trade of Nottingham. It brought much wealth to the inventor, but he unfortunately dissipated his fortune in bringing out other inventions.

=== Urban planner ===
In 1825, taking advantage of a sale of land to the north of Nottingham in Sherwood — then a hamlet — Hall laid out the grid street pattern to the north-east of Mansfield Road, including Hall Street and Marshall Street, the latter named after his brother, Marshall.

=== Steam condenser ===
In 1838 Hall patented his "surface condenser", in which the steam is condensed by passing it through a number of small tubes cooled on the outside. It was chiefly intended for use at sea, and it was hoped that the difficulties attending the presence of salt in boilers would be obviated by charging them with fresh water at the start of a voyage and then recycling it. The invention was extensively tried out. The first steamship fitted with Hall's marine surface condensers was St George Steam Packet Company's Prince Llewellyn in 1834. The same company had such condensers installed in the paddle steamer the Sirius that would make the first transatlantic crossing by a steam passenger vessel, between 4–22 April, 1838, at an average speed of 8.03 knots (14.87 km/h). However, the steam condenser resulted in high coal consumption. In 1837 two steam engines, fitted with Hall's condensers, were installed in Hercules and gave satisfactory results on a test run from London to Gravesend. In 1842 Sir Edward Parry reported on behalf of the Admiralty that six of Hall's condensers had been fitted in steam packets; that they had given two to six years' service, but had then been removed, because their complexity made them difficult to keep in order. However, the principle of tubular condensers has subsequently been used generally for cooling purposes. His other patents, which number twenty in all, relate chiefly to steam engines and boilers.

== Death and recognition ==
Hall died on 21 November 1863 in very reduced circumstances, in Tredegar Square, Bow. Hall's inventions have become largely unknown, but in 2010 a pub, in a former electric tram shed on the A60 road, in Sherwood, was named The Samuel Hall after him.
