= Amanda Davies (geographer) =

Australian geographer

Amanda Davies is an Australian geographer working in the field of demography, population geography and rural and regional development.

== Education ==
Davies has a Bachelor of Science from University of Western Australia. She earned her PhD from University of New England (Australia). She continued her studies at Massachusetts Institute of Technology, Oxford University, Melbourne University and Victoria University of Wellington.

While at Curtin University in the School of Built Environment, Davies and Curtin colleague, Samantha Hall, Curtin University Sustainability Policy Institute (CUSP), traveled to Antartica in 2016, on a Homeward Bound expedition dedicated to elevating the leadership skills of women and build collaborations among women working on sustainability.

== Career ==
Davies was a senior lecturer in the Department of Planning and Geography at Curtin University. Then she began a position at UWA in 2020.

As of 2024, Davies is a professor and head of school at the University of Western Australia's School of Social Sciences, and adjunct professor, at Curtin University's School of Molecular and Life Sciences. Davies research is applied, as she focuses on examining population growth, patterns of demographic change in response to economic, social or climate changes.

Davies works closely with the Australian government, and is a principal investigator on five major projects, including working with the Australian Research Council (ARC) and Volunteering Australia on examining rural volunteerism, economic development pathways and responsiveness in mining transition, population mobility in the digital economy and counterurbanization and COVID (ARC).

== Honors and awards ==
- Fellow, Institute of Australian Geographers

== Selected bibliography ==
- Geographies of Aging: Social Processes and the Spatial Unevenness of Population Aging, with A. James (October 2016)
- Geography, Place and International Development Volunteering (2021)
- Pandemic Cities: The Covid-19 and Australian Urban Regions, with E. Baker, S. Baum, J. Stone and E. Taylor (September 2023)
- Through an Australian Lens: Exploring the Impact of Body-Worn Cameras on Police-Community Relations (2023)
