= Sam Hall (story) =

Science fiction novelette (1953)

First publication cover art by H. R. Van Dongen.

"Sam Hall" is a science fiction novelette by American writer Poul Anderson, first published in Astounding Science Fiction in August 1953. It was later collected in The Best of Poul Anderson.

== Synopsis ==
The story is set at an unspecified time in the 21st-century, in the aftermath of several additional world wars. The United States - which has emerged as the victor of the last of these - has descended into totalitarianism (while retaining the outward forms of republican government); it now exercises a security hegemony over the entire remainder of the Earth, with only the Anglosphere nations enjoying some form of autonomy. It also maintains a vast surveillance-fed database of all citizens, which is kept on "Matilda," a vast electromechanical computer housed in an underground base commanded by US Army Major Thornberg. An apolitical veteran of the US-Brazil war, Thornberg is considered reliable by the regime, but something in him snaps when his nephew is sent to a concentration camp and shortly thereafter murdered. In an act of petty, symbolic rebellion, he uses his unrestricted access to Matilda to fabricate the existence of a small-time anti-government militant, whom he names "Sam Hall" after the angry folk song of the same name; he compounds his betrayal by discreetly inserting evidence of Hall's involvement into the records of real crimes. Eventually, an extant anti-regime underground — which has been growing more brazen — starts to actively use the Sam Hall nom de guerre in claims of responsibility for its attacks, and the fictional rebel becomes a household name.

Unable to obtain any independently verifiable information on Hall, the government begins to suspect internal subversion and grows increasingly paranoid; meanwhile, the rebels launch a full-scale civil war, which they bill as the "Third American Revolution." Thornberg takes advantage of the worsening chaos by inserting incriminating fabrications into the records of senior regime personnel, in the desperate hope that the regime can be brought down before it can recall its Venusian garrison troops — which include his son — to reinforce Earth. With the government paralyzed and disintegrating, loyalist soldiers arrive at the Matilda base to arrest Thornberg, who is at this point himself unsure whether his treason has finally been discovered or whether he has merely been randomly implicated in one of his own fabricated witch-hunts. He forces the soldiers to surrender by demonstrating a dead-man switch he has rigged to wipe all the data stored in Matilda.

In an epilogue, Thornberg asks a rebel officer what will be done with the computer; the man promises that it will be destroyed once the war ends, as the underground believes that a government's ability to conduct this level of surveillance is incompatible with democracy.

== Setting ==
The story never elaborates what political developments led to the state of affairs at its outset. Thornberg notes the conventional wisdom that the US loss in World War III had forced the nation to become a "garrison state" in order to prevail in World War IV, but it is not specified who the combatants in either of these conflicts had been; the USSR is never mentioned in the story (aside from the detail that Moscow, Idaho has been renamed to "Americatown"). Either of the world wars mentioned might correspond with a conflict ten years prior to the story, in which China had carried out "abortive" nuclear attacks on several American cities; at some point prior to that, the US had also fought (and won) a war against Brazil. Thornberg privately suspects the former may have been a false flag operation conducted by the US regime itself, and is certain that the latter conflict was a pretext to obtain territorial rights and minerals.

In addition to its hegemony on Earth, the USA also has exclusive control of all human settlements in the Solar System; the most important of these is a pre-Mariner habitable Venus, which hosts thorium mines operated by slave labor under brutal conditions. There are also colonies on Mars, the Moon, and the Jovian satellites.

== Sequel ==
In 1964, Anderson published the novel Three Worlds to Conquer, a loose sequel to "Sam Hall", as a two-part serial in the January and February 1964 issues of Worlds of IF. A paperback edition followed in April. The novel is set on a US prison colony on Ganymede during the rebellion on Earth.

== Reception ==
In 2004, the story was a finalist for the 1954 Retro-Hugo award for Best Novelette. In 2014, the story was a finalist for the Prometheus Award Hall of Fame. The story won the Prometheus Hall of Fame Award in 2020.

James E. Gunn has said that the story shows how computers are vulnerable to unreliable data, while Strange Horizons considers the story to be "as much (...) social commentary as science fiction".
