= Samantha Hall (scientist) =

Australian environmental researcher

Samantha "Sam" Hall (born 1982) is an Australian environmental researcher. She is also an Antarctic scientist and entrepreneur.

== Biography ==
As a child, Hall had her first epileptic seizure when she was 11. In 2002, Hall graduated from Curtin University with a bachelor's degree in commerce. Around 2007, when she was 27, she was able to have surgery for her seizures. While she was still working in Thailand, she decided she was going to pursue environmental science. She returned to Curtin University in 2009 and earned a master of science in sustainability management. She went on to earn her doctorate in sustainable building during 2011.

In 2011, she co-founded an environmental consultancy organization in Fremantle, called SimplyCarbon. In 2013, she was appointed by the city of Perth to investigate using environmental upgrade agreements to improve the sustainability of local buildings. In 2016, Hall was part of the Homeward Bound expedition to Antarctica, along with Amanda Davies.

She is also a founder of a technology startup in Perth, Rate My Space.

Hall leads the company Campus Intuition which examines and designs research, learning and living spaces in a campus setting.
