= Kris Neville =

American novelist

Krissman Ottman Neville
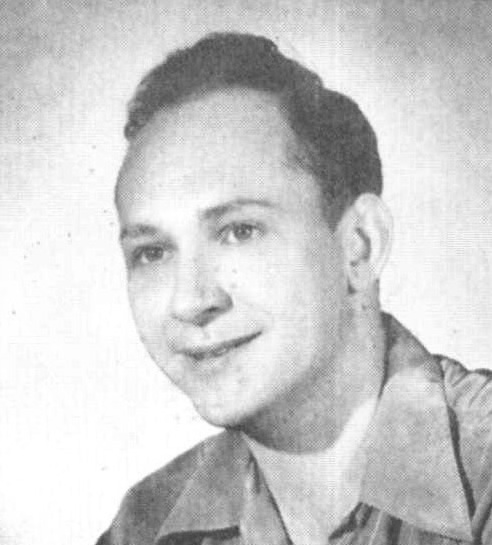
- Kris Neville c. 1952
- Born: May 9, 1925; Carthage, Missouri
- Died: December 23, 1980 (aged 55); Los Angeles, CA
- Occupations: Novelist; short story writer; journalist
- Spouse: Lillian Johnson-Neville
- Writing career
- Pen name: Henderson Starke
- Period: 1949–1976
- Genre: Science fiction

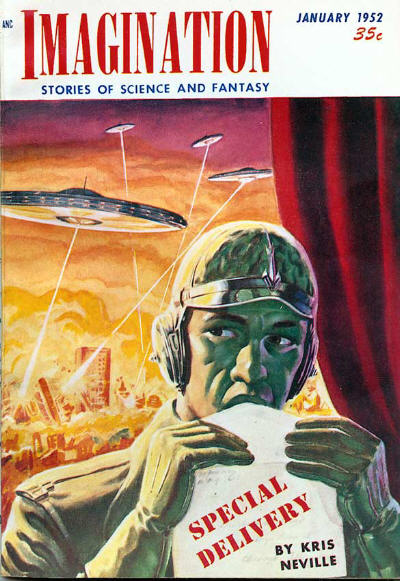
Neville's novella "Special Delivery" was the cover story for the January 1952 issue of Imagination

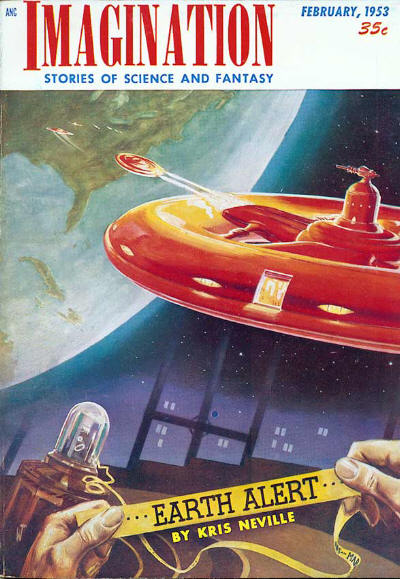
Neville's novella "Earth Alert" was cover-featured on the February 1952 issue of Imagination

Kris Ottman Neville (May 9, 1925 – December 23, 1980) was an American science fiction writer from California.

He was born in St. Louis. His first science fiction work was published in 1949. His most famous work, the novella Bettyann, is considered a classic of science fiction.

== Critical reception ==
Well known science fiction writer and critic Barry N. Malzberg wrote the following biographical note about Kris Neville in his introduction to Neville's story Ballenger's People in the 1979 Doubleday collection Neglected Visions:

Kris Neville could have been among the ten most honored science fiction writers of his generation; instead, he virtually abandoned the field after conquering it early on and made himself the leading lay authority in the world on epoxy resins, collaborating on a series of specialized texts that have become the basic works in their field. I can hardly blame him for this decision, and it was in any case carefully thought out. Neville, who sold his first story in 1949 and another fifteen by 1952, concluded early on that the perimeters of the field in the 1950s were simply too close to contain the kind of work he would have to do if he wanted to grow as a writer, and accordingly he quit. A scattering of stories has appeared over the last quarter of a century, and a couple of novels, but except for one abortive attempt to write full-time in the mid-1960s (the field simply could not absorb the kind of work he was doing), Neville has been in a state of diminished production for a long time. Nowadays a short-short story shows up once a year or so in a magazine or original anthology; sometimes written in collaboration with his second wife, Lil, and always so astonishingly above the run of material surrounding it as to constitute an embarrassment to the other writers. Neville, whom I do not claim to know well at all but with whom I did correspond prolifically some years ago, may be among the most intelligent of science fiction writers (only A. J. Budrys seems to have his eclecticism and his breadth) and strikes me as among the few contented people I have ever known. ... Neville has done some extraordinary political satire – The Price of Simeryl, published way back in 1966, is an early, savage anti-Vietnam piece – and in work like New Apples in the Garden manifests an extraordinary range of subject and character.

Shortly after Neville's death in 1980, a remembrance by Malzberg was published in Locus Magazine, and later re-published in The Science Fiction of Kris Neville (Southern Illinois University Press, 1984.) It includes these additional observations:

"I never met Kris Neville. I collaborated with him on three short stories and an abortive novel and spoke to him on the telephone five to ten times. What I did was correspond with him for over a decade starting in 1969 and there must exist in my files somewhere at least 200,000 words of Nevilliliana .... I could not divest myself of any of these letters because what they are the lucid and balanced evidence of a powerful mind focused by a powerful soul who inch by inch had worked his way through to a purifying and terrible clarity of vision ... that a serious literary career was impossible in science fiction (impossible out of it too because there was simply no audience left for 'serious' fiction in this country.) The limitations of the audience and the limitations of editing made no writer capable of doing an ambitious and improving body of work which would reach an audience and take that audience along. Neville ascribed virtually every failure in the modern history of the genre to meretricious, debased, or cowardly editors, not to the writers ... Neville by his own testimony had to leave science fiction in the early fifties. He began publishing in 1949, he found that he could very easily sell to the Bouchers, Golds, or Campbells of his time and quickly satisfied his original ambitions. What he could not do was to continue to follow the course of his vision. Quickly he ran up against the imposed borders of the field and almost as quickly he quit. There was a decade of near-total silence. In the mid-sixties as a fortieth birthday present to himself he financed a two-year attempt to establish a real position in science fiction but although many strange and wonderful stories appeared, ... rotten agenting, the limitations of the field, and a certain powerful revulsion in Neville himself that made him unable to push for entrance into something which he knew had wrecked his spirit, drove him away again and in the last dozen years of his life he produced only a scattering of short stories for the magazines and the original anthologies, none of them longer than a few thousand words. Collaboration on important texts in the field of epoxy resins – on which he knew more than any layman – and employment in the chemical industry kept him busy, well remunerated, and content. By the late seventies he had achieved enough equivolcal peace to be able to come back to science fiction with a scholar's interest, a scholar's contribution. ... He liked wine, hated Nixon, deplored the mass media, missed Tony Boucher, had grudging and deep respect for the memory of John W. Campbell, loved his children, had a deep suspicion of American industry and its products but no particular reverence for his Volvo, found [science fiction] conventions, finally, wearying and had a deep and abiding love for the science fiction community.

== Works ==
=== Novels ===
- The Unearth People (1964)
- The Mutants (1966)
- Peril of the Starmen (1967)
- Special Delivery (1967)
- Bettyann (1970)
- Invaders on the Moon (1970)
- Bettyann's Children (1973)

=== Collections ===
- Mission: Manstop (1971)
- The Science Fiction of Kris Neville (1984)

=== Short stories ===
- "Cold War" (1949)
- "Dumb Supper" (1950) (writing as Henderson Starke)
- "Seeds of Futurity" (1951)
- "Franchise" (1951)
- "Hunt the Hunter" (1951)
- "Old Man Henderson" (1951)
- "Casting Office" (1951) (writing as Henderson Starke)
- "Bettyann" (1951) (original short story in "New Tales of Space and Time" ed. Raymond J. Healy, 1951)
- "Underground Movement" (1952)
- "The Man with the Fine Mind" (1953)
- "Worship Night" (1953)
- "Overture" (1954)
- "Moral Equivalent" (1957)
- "General Max Shorter" (1962)
- "Voyage to Far N'Jurd" (1963)
- "New Apples In the Garden" (1963)
- "Shamar's War" (1964)
- "The Price of Simeryl" (1966)
- "Ballenger's People" (1967)
- "The Forest of Zil" (1967)
- "From the Government Printing Office" (1967)
- "The Night of the Nickel Beer" (1967)
- "Thyre Planet" (1968)
- "The Reality Machine" (1970)
- "Survival Problems" (1974)
- "Take Two Quiggies"
- "Closing Time"
