= Barry N. Malzberg =

American writer and editor (1939–2024)

- Born: Barry Nathaniel Malzberg; July 24, 1939; New York City, U.S.
- Died: December 19, 2024 (aged 85); Saddle River, New Jersey, U.S.
- Education: Syracuse University
- Occupation: Novelist
- Writing career
- Pen name: Nathan Herbert, K. M. O'Donnell
- Language: English
- Genre: Recursive science fiction

Barry Nathaniel Malzberg (July 24, 1939 – December 19, 2024) was an American writer and editor, most often of science fiction and fantasy.

== Life and career ==
=== Early life and family ===
Malzberg originated from a Jewish family and graduated from Syracuse University in 1960. He worked as an investigator for the New York City Department of Welfare in 1961–1962 and 1963–1964. In 1963, he was employed as a reimbursement agent for the New York State Department of Mental Health. He married Joyce Zelnick in 1964.

=== Literary career ===
Malzberg initially sought to establish himself as a playwright as well as a prose-fiction writer. In 1964, he returned to Syracuse University for graduate study in creative writing. Although he was awarded a Schubert Foundation Playwriting Fellowship (1964–1965) and the Cornelia Ward Creative Writing Fellowship (1965), he was unable to sell his work to any of the literary magazines of the era. Resolving not to be an "unpublished assistant professor of English," he left the program in 1965 to pursue a career as a freelance writer and agent for the Scott Meredith Literary Agency. Malzberg would intermittently continue with SMLA through the next several decades, being one of its last caretakers.

His first published story was "The Bed" under the pseudonym "Nathan Herbert" in the men's magazine Wildcat. His first science fiction story ("We're Coming Through the Window") was published in the August 1967 issue of Galaxy. Malzberg frequently repurposed existing stories for his science fiction sales. He first found commercial and critical success with publication of his surreal novelette "Final War" in The Magazine of Fantasy and Science Fiction under the name "K. M. O'Donnell" in 1968.

He had been writing erotic novels using the pseudonym "Mel Johnson" but began writing erotic novels under his own name in 1968 for Maurice Girodias's Olympia Press. Many of his science short stories and novels in the late 1960s were published under the pseudonym "K. M. O'Donnell", derived from the surnames of Henry Kuttner, C. L. Moore, and their joint pseudonym "Lawrence O'Donnell."

He was an editor at Escapade, a men's magazine, in early 1968. In the latter half of 1968 he edited Amazing Stories and Fantastic science fiction and fantasy-fiction magazines. He was the editor of the Science Fiction Writers of America Bulletin in 1969 until he was asked to resign because of a critical editorial he wrote about the NASA space program.

Malzberg's writing style is distinctive, frequently employing long, elaborate sentences with few commas. Most of his science fiction books are short, present-tense narratives concerned exclusively with the consciousness of a single obsessive character. His themes, particularly in the novels Beyond Apollo (1972) and The Falling Astronauts (1971) about the US space exploration programme, include the dehumanisation effects of bureaucracy and technology; his treatment of these themes sometimes exhibits strong resemblances to Franz Kafka, accompanied by unreliable narrator techniques. In novels like Galaxies (1975) and Herovit's World (1973), Malzberg uses metafiction techniques to subject the heroic conventions and literary limitations of space opera to biting satire.

He edited anthologies such as Final Stage (with Edward L. Ferman), also several in collaboration with Bill Pronzini and others. In interviews and memoirs he detailed how many of his novels have been written within weeks or even days: for example, at the beginning of 1973 he was commissioned to write the series of novels "The Lone Wolf", ten of which he completed by October 1973. Aside from fantastic fiction, he was a prolific writer of crime fiction and other genres, under his own name, as O'Donnell, and as Mike Barry and under other pseudonyms. He also often wrote in collaboration with Pronzini, Kathe Koja, and others. He wrote the novelization of the Saul Bass-directed 1974 film Phase IV. At the end of 1975 he made numerous public statements that he was retiring from science fiction.

He was also nominated several times for the Hugo Award (including for the stories "In the Stone House" and "Understanding Entropy"), and won the Locus Award for his collection of historical and critical essays, The Engines of the Night (1982).

=== Reception ===
Malzberg's work has been widely praised by critics, while being attacked by proponents of hard science fiction for its pessimistic, anti-Campbellian tenor. The dystopian and metafictional elements of Malzberg's work led to a parody by Paul Di Filippo, whose first published story, "Falling Expectations", was a parody of Malzberg. Theodore Sturgeon said of Malzberg in 1973, "I look forward eagerly to his byline, snatch joyfully at it when I see it and he has never let me down." Writing in The Paris Review, critic J.D. Daniels said of Malzberg: "Malzberg’s books, in their tortured self-awareness, are primarily about writing: its technical difficulties and moral pitfalls, its potential to cheapen or calcify, its temptation to fraudulence or ventriloquism, the insisted-on inadequacy of language as an excuse for not being a less recursive or less involuted writer, and so on."

=== Science Fiction Writers of America ===
For years, Malzberg collaborated with friend and fellow science fiction writer Mike Resnick on a series of more than 50 advice columns for writers in the Science Fiction and Fantasy Writers of America's quarterly magazine SFWA Bulletin. They have been collected as The Business of Science Fiction.

Malzberg was a regular contributor to the SFWA Bulletin published by the Science Fiction and Fantasy Writers of America. In 2013, articles he wrote for the Bulletin with Mike Resnick triggered a controversy about sexism among members of the association. Female authors strongly objected to comments by Resnick and Malzberg such as references to "lady editors" and "lady writers" who were "beauty pageant beautiful" or a "knock out." Bulletin editor Jean Rabe resigned her post in the course of the controversy.

He had been a resident of Teaneck, New Jersey, for many years.

=== Stark House Press Reissues ===
Stark House Press has reissued more than forty of Malzberg's novels and short story collections, along with two new short story collections: "Collecting Myself: The Uncollected Stories of Barry N. Malzberg" (edited by Robert Friedman and Gregory Shepard) and "Collaborative Capers" (edited by Robert Friedman).

=== Death ===
Malzberg died in Saddle River, New Jersey, on December 19, 2024, at the age of 85. He was survived by his wife and daughters. Malzberg had been suffering from a series of medical problems, culminating in pneumonia and a bacterial infection. An obituary titled "Novelist on a Deadline: Barry Malzberg, 1939–2024," and stating that Malzberg wrote "quickly and brilliantly in a variety of genres," appeared in the December 23, 2024 issue of The Nation.
