= The Best of John Sladek =

1981 collection of science fiction short stories by John Sladek

- Cover of first edition
- Author: John Sladek
- Cover artist: Alan Magee
- Language: English
- Series: The Best of ... series
- Genre: Science fiction
- Publisher: Pocket Books
- Publication date: 1981
- Publication place: United States
- Media type: Print (paperback)
- Pages: 220
- ISBN: 0-671-83131-3
- OCLC: 7147359
- Preceded by: The Best of Walter M. Miller, Jr.
- Followed by: The Best of Randall Garrett

The Best of John Sladek is a collection of science fiction short stories by American author John Sladek. It was first published in paperback by Pocket Books in January 1981 as the tenth volume in its Best of ... series.

== Previous versions ==
The book's contents were selected from two previous Sladek collections, The Steam-Driven Boy and other Strangers (Panther, 1973), and Keep the Giraffe Burning (Panther/Granada, 1977),

== Summary ==
The book contains forty short works of fiction by the author. Stories marked SB were previously collected in The Steam-Driven Boy and other Strangers (1973); stories marked KG were previously collected in Keep the Giraffe Burning (1977).

== Contents ==
- "The Secret of the Old Custard" (1966) SB, KG
- "The Poets of Millgrove, Iowa" (1966) KG
- "The Best-Seller" (1966) SB
- "Is There Death on Other Planets?" (1966) SB
- "The Happy Breed" (1967) SB
- "The Singular Visitor from Not-Yet" (1968) SB
- "The Short, Happy Wife of Mansard Eliot" (1971) SB
- "The Momster" (1969) SB
- "1937 A.D.!" (1967) SB
- "The Transcendental Sandwich" (1973) SB
- "The Steam-Driven Boy" (1972) SB
- "Elephant with Wooden Leg" (1975) KG
- "The Locked Room" (1972) KG
- "The Face" (1974) KG
- "Heavens Below: Fifteen Utopias"
  - "Getting There Is (n-1/n)th the Fun" (1975) KG
  - "The Bright Side" (1975) KG
  - "Mr. and Ms. America" (1975) KG
  - "Empty Promise" (1975) KG
  - "The Paradise Problem" (1975) KG
  - "What Changed Doyster's Mind" (1975) KG
  - "Handout" (1975) KG
  - "Assessment" (1975) KG
  - "Art News" (1975) KG
  - "Pax Gurney" (1975) KG
  - "A Fable" (1975) KG
  - "Utopia: A Financial Report" (1975) KG
  - "Utopiary" (1975) KG
  - "Luck" (1975) KG
  - "A Picnic" (1975) KG
- "Space Shoes of the Gods" (1974) KG
- "The Parodies"
  - "The Purloined Butter...*dg*r *ll*n P**" (1972) SB
  - "Pemberley's Start-Afresh Calliope or, the New Proteus...H.G. W*lls" (1971) SB
  - "Ralph 4F...H*g* G*rnsb*ck (Hugogre N. Backs)" (1973) SB
  - "Engineer to the Gods...R*b*rt H**nl**n (Hitler I.E. Bonner)" (1972) SB
  - "Broot Force...*s**c *s*m*v (Iclick As-I-Move)" (1972) SB
  - "Joy Ride...R*y Br*db*ry (Barry DuBray)" (1972) SB
  - "The Moon Is Sixpence...*rth*r C. Cl*rk* (Carl Truhacker)" (1973) SB
  - "Solar Shoe-Salesman...Ph*l*p K. D*ck (Chipdip K. Kill)" (1973) SB
  - "One Damned Thing After Another...C*rdw**n*r Sm*th (A Co-ordainer's Myth)" (1973) SB
  - "The Sublimation World...J.G. B*ll*rd (J.G. B-)" (1973) SB

== Awards ==
The book placed thirteenth in the 1982 Locus Poll Award for Best Single Author Collection.

== Reception ==
The book was reviewed by Theodore Sturgeon in Rod Serling's The Twilight Zone Magazine, June 1981, and Darrell Schweitzer in Science Fiction Review, Summer 1982.
