= Tik-Tok (Oz) =

Fictional character from L. Frank Baum's Oz series

- Oz character
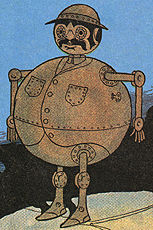
- Tik-Tok as he appears in Ozma of Oz illustrated by John R. Neill
- First appearance: Ozma of Oz (1907)
- Created by: L. Frank Baum
- Portrayed by: Timothy D. Rose (head operator, 1985 film); Michael Sundin (body, 1985 film)
- Voiced by: Sean Barrett (1985 film); Jess Harnell (Dorothy and the Wizard of Oz)

In-universe information
- Species: Robot
- Gender: male in likeness
- Title: Adviser to Ozma of Oz
- Nationality: Ev

Tik-Tok is a fictional "mechanical man" from the Oz books by American author L. Frank Baum. He has been termed "the prototype robot", and is widely considered to be one of the first robots to appear in modern literature, though the term "Robot" was not used until the 1920s, in the play R.U.R.

== Baum's character ==
Baum introduces Tik-Tok (sometimes spelled "TikTok") as a round-bodied mechanical man, made of burnished copper and propelled by clockwork which periodically needs re-winding, as in a wind-up toy or mechanical clock. Tik-Tok has separate winding-mechanisms for thought, action, and speech; he himself has no ability to re-wind any of them, and when his works run down, he becomes frozen or mute. For one memorable moment in The Road to Oz, he continues to speak but utters gibberish. When he speaks, only his teeth move. Baum describes Tik-Tok's head and limbs as jointed as in a knight's suit of armor. Robotic mechanical strength helps Tik-Tok, single-handedly, to face down a whole horde of hostile Wheelers with little difficulty, — a scenario echoed in the 1985 spin-off film Return to Oz.

As Baum repeatedly mentions, Tik-Tok is not alive and feels no emotions. He therefore can no more love or be loved than a sewing machine, but as a servant he is utterly truthful and loyal. He describes himself as a "slave" to Dorothy and defers to her.

In-universe, Baum's characters Smith and Tinker (trading as SMITH & TINKER) manufactured Tik-Tok at their works in Evna (the capital city of the Land of Ev). He was the only model of his kind made before the two disappeared. He was purchased by the king of Ev, Evoldo, who gave him the name Tik-Tok because of the sound he made when wound. The cruel king also whipped his mechanical servant, but his whippings caused no pain and merely kept Tik-Tok's round copper body polished.

=== Appearances in the works of Baum ===
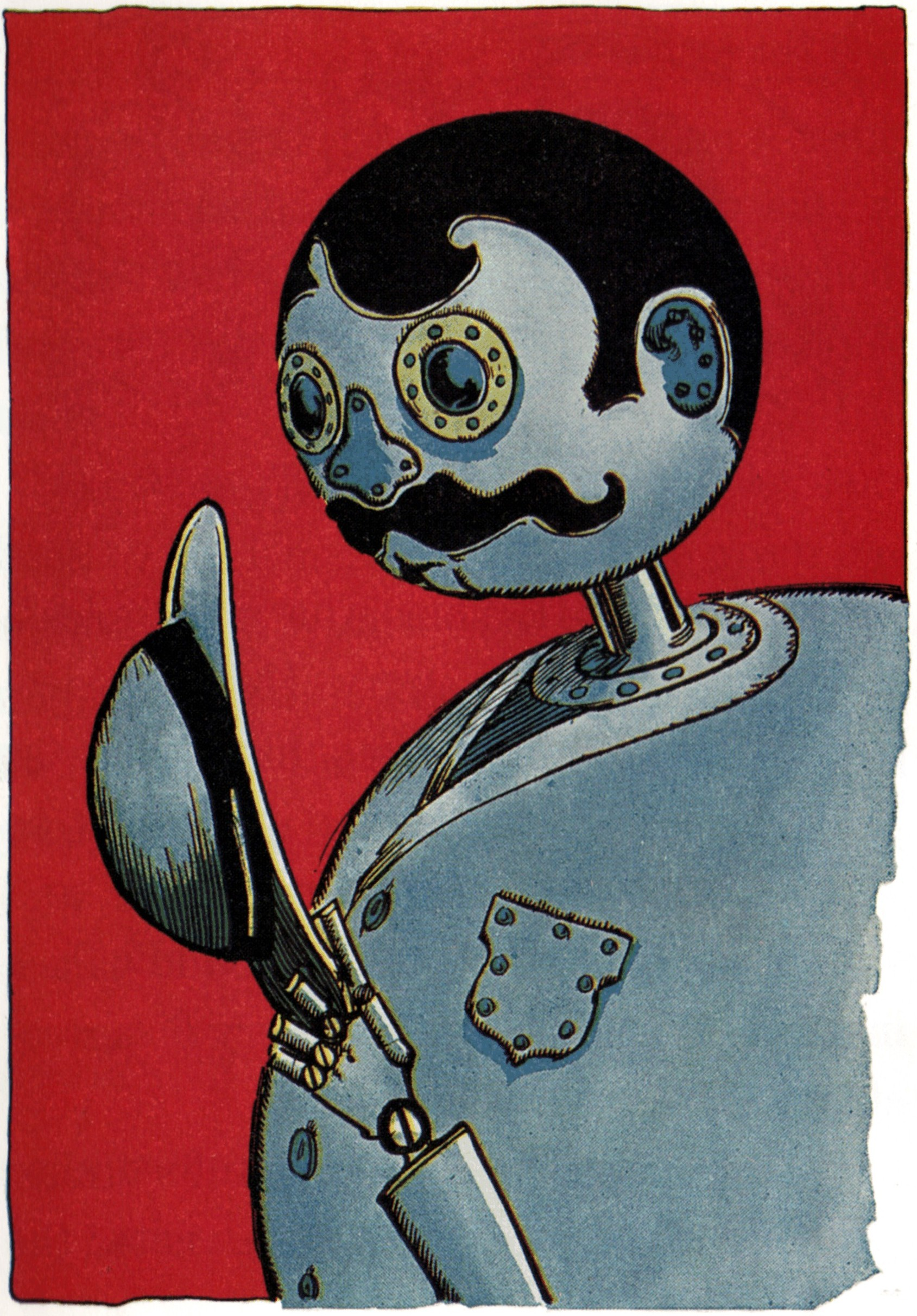
Tik-Tok in Little Wizard Stories of Oz, 1914.

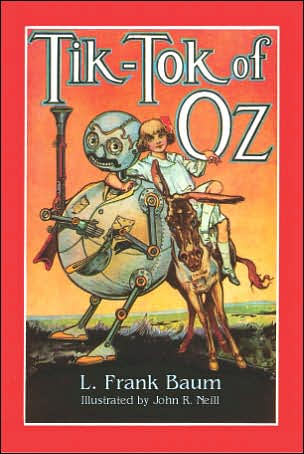
Tik-Tok in Tik-Tok of Oz, 1914.

Tik-Tok first appears in Ozma of Oz (1907) where Dorothy Gale discovers him locked up in a cave, wound down and immobile. He becomes Dorothy's servant and protector, and, despite his tendency to run down at crucial moments, helps to subdue the Nome King. That novel also introduces Tik-Tok's monotonic, halting mode of speech: "Good morn-ing, lit-tle girl."

Later Baum published "Tik-Tok and the Nome King", a short tale in his Little Wizard Stories of Oz series (1914). In this story, Ruggedo the Nome King, angered by Tik-Tok's calling him a "fat nome", smashes him to pieces. Kaliko, Ruggedo's Chief Steward, secretly reassembles Tik-Tok without informing his master. Ruggedo mistakes the rebuilt Tik-Tok for a ghost. Ever after, he was colored whitish-grey in color plates, apparently a mistake.

The Tik-Tok Man of Oz, a 1913 stage musical loosely adapted by Baum from Ozma of Oz, was re-adapted by Baum back into a novel called Tik-Tok of Oz, the eighth "Land of Oz" book, published on June 19, 1914. Although Tik-Tok is a major character in that latter book, he in no way drives the plot. Tik-Tok also appears in most other Oz novels as a notable inhabitant of the Emerald City, most prominently in The Scalawagons of Oz, in which he operates the production of the Scalawagons.

== Appearances in adult fiction ==
In the comic book Oz Squad, Tik-Tok's "Internal Clockwork Morality Spring" winds down and causes him to act violent and sexual, though he closely resembles Neill's depiction.

A somewhat sinister version of Tik-Tok is a minor character in Gregory Maguire's revisionist Oz novel Wicked: The Life and Times of the Wicked Witch of the West. In the novel, tiktok is used as an adjective for any mechanical or robotic being. The character Madame Morrible has a tiktok servant, called Grommetik, whose description matches Baum's Tik-Tok; however, this character's speech key is never wound. It is strongly implied that this tiktok servant kills Doctor Dillamond, on Madame Morrible's orders. Though no great detail is spent on the topic, Grommetik eventually becomes independent, and, possibly due to disgust at the things he was forced to do, tries to foment rebellion among the tik-toks.

In John Sladek's 1983 novel Tik-Tok, a psychopathic robot named Tik-Tok, having overcome his asimov circuits, commits a series of horrific crimes and spreads chaos and bloodshed, later becoming rich and elected vice-president of the United States.

Gregory Benford's 1997 novel Foundation's Fear, set tens of thousands of years in the future, depicts a group of robots named tik-toks, who are responsible for supervising the automated farms on the planet Trantor. A tik-tok revolt against the forces of the Galactic Empire play a major role in the novel.

== Later works ==
Tik-Tok was played by Wallace Illington in the 1908 film, The Fairylogue and Radio-Plays, which is now known only from a production still or two. In 1913, the comedian James C. Morton played Tik-Tok in The Tik-Tok Man of Oz, a musical play by Baum, Louis F. Gottschalk, Victor Schertzinger, and Oliver Morosco. The role of Tik-Tok was a straight man role similar to that of David C. Montgomery's Tin Woodman in The Wizard of Oz. Corresponding to Fred Stone's Scarecrow or clown part was Shaggy Man, played by Frank F. Moore, who would later play the Scarecrow in His Majesty, the Scarecrow of Oz. Tik-Tok did not appear in any of the productions of The Oz Film Manufacturing Company.

Tik-Tok appeared in the 1980 television special Thanksgiving in the Land of Oz voiced by Joan Gerber.

Tik-Tok was a main character in Disney's Return to Oz, adapted from The Marvelous Land of Oz and Ozma of Oz. His legs are very stout and he speaks with his mustache rather than his teeth. In the film, he is the entire Royal Army of Oz, which is ironic considering his general haplessness, partly from the character's in-book inability to wind up his clockworks for himself. In an interview for the Elstree project, director Walter Murch explained that Tik-Tok's physical performance was created by the acrobat Michael Sundin: "he would put his legs down into Tik-Tok's legs, and then he would bend over looking through his legs, through his thighs, and then he would cross his arms [across his chest] to operate Tik-Tok's arms". He used an LCD feed inside the costume to monitor his movements. Due to the heat and physical exertion of being upside-down, according to Murch, Sundin's "limit was two and half minutes from the moment the lid went on". Sean Barrett provided his voice, while Tim Rose remotely-operated the head.

Tik-Tok appears in the 2017 TV series Dorothy and the Wizard of Oz voiced by Jess Harnell. Just like the books, Tik-Tok was created by Smith & Tinker.

== Other appearances ==
Tik-Tok's design was used in the video game Epic Mickey 2 as a design for the "Basher" Beetleworx.

== See also ==
- Tik-Tok, 1983 novel
