= Demijohn (disambiguation) =

A demijohn is a container for fluids used in brewing.

Demijohn may also refer to:

- Thom Demijohn, a joint pseudonym used by authors Thomas M. Disch and John Sladek for their satirical novel Black Alice
- Demijohn Lake (Ontario), a lake in Thunder Bay District, Ontario, Canada
