= Zoran Perisic (visual effects artist) =

Serbian-American visual effects artist

Zoran Perišić
- Зоран Перишић
- Born: March 16, 1940 (age 86); Prokuplje, Toplica District, Yugoslavia (present-day Serbia)
- Education: University of Belgrade; University of Birmingham
- Occupations: Visual effects artist, film director

Zoran Perišić (Serbian Cyrillic: Зоран Перишић; born March 16, 1940) is a Serbian-American visual effects artist and film director. He is best known for creating the "Zoptic" front projection process, which was invented to achieve the flying scenes in the 1978 film Superman. For his work in Superman, he won a Special Achievement Academy Award and a BAFTA Outstanding British Contribution to Cinema Award. He was also nominated for an Academy Award in the category Best Visual Effects for the film Return to Oz.

== Early life ==
Perisic was born in Prokuplje in 1940. He graduated from the University of Belgrade, before moving to the UK to study at the University of Birmingham.

== Career ==
Early in his career, he worked as a documentary and animation cameraman for ITV Yorkshire, where he created and directed the programme The Magic Fountain. Perisic's first feature film credit was in the effects department of 2001: A Space Odyssey (1968). In a 2013 interview, Perisic said "We had a lot of challenges on Stanley Kubrick’s 2001- A Space Odyssey with spacecraft and rockets flying against star backgrounds; I felt that there had to be a more efficient way other than rotoscoping and hand painted mattes."

== Selected filmography ==
- Superman (1978; co-won the Special Achievement Academy Award with Les Bowie, Colin Chilvers, Denys Coop, Roy Field and Derek Meddings)
- Return to Oz (1985; co-nominated with Will Vinton, Ian Wingrove and Michael Lloyd)
- Sky Bandits (1986), as director
