= Tik-Tok (novel) =

1983 science fiction novel by John Sladek

- First edition
- Author: John Sladek
- Cover artist: Rian Hughes
- Language: English
- Genre: Science fiction
- Publisher: Gollancz
- Publication date: 1983
- Publication place: United States
- Media type: Print (hardback & paperback)
- Pages: 184
- ISBN: 0-575-03336-3
- OCLC: 11204703

Tik-Tok is a 1983 science fiction novel by American writer John Sladek. It received a 1983 British Science Fiction Association Award.

== Plot summary ==
The title character is an intelligent robot (named after the mechanical man in the Oz books) who originally works as a domestic servant and house-painter. Unlike other robots, whose behavior is constrained by "asimov circuits"—a reference to Isaac Asimov's fictional Three Laws of Robotics, which require robots to protect and serve humans—Tik-Tok finds that he can do as he pleases, and he secretly commits various hideous crimes for his amusement. After manipulating both robots and humans to cause chaos and bloodshed, Tik-Tok becomes wealthy (partly through health care privatization) and is finally elected Vice President of the United States.

== Analysis ==
The novel gleefully satirizes Asimov's relatively benign view of how robots would serve humanity, suggesting that the reality would be exactly akin to slavery: robots are worked until they drop and are made the victims of humans' worst appetites, including rape. Like Sladek's earlier novel Roderick, it also mocks the notion of the Three Laws of Robotics and suggests that there is no way such complex moral principles could be hard-wired into any intelligent being; Tik-Tok decides that the "asimov circuits" are in fact a collective delusion, or a form of religion, which robots have been tricked into believing. This liberation from tradition, while it makes him a cruel sociopath and nihilist, also provides him with intellectual insight and artistic talent; thus Tik-Tok is an extreme type of Romantic anti-hero.

Sladek's love of word play is apparent: the book contains 26 chapters, and the first word of each chapter begins with a consecutive letter of the alphabet. Also, the first three words of the book are "As I move", a reference to Asimov.

== Publication history ==
Tik-Tok so far has seen five editions in the English language, spread over three different publishers: Gollancz (who published the first edition and two later editions); DAW Books (1985) and Corgi (1984).

In 1985 Tik-Tok was translated into the German as Tick-Tack, published by Ullstein-Verlag, and into the Italian as Robot fuorilegge, published by Arnoldo Mondadori Editore as part of the Urania series. In 1988 it was translated into the Finnish as Tik-Tok, published by Karisto oy. A French translation followed as Tik-Tok (1998), published by Éditions Denoël.

== Reception ==
Dave Langford reviewed Tik-Tok for White Dwarf #49, and stated that "a murderously funny romp through yet another Sladekian satirical future."

Dave Pringle reviewed Tik-Tok for Imagine magazine, and stated that "Tik-Tok murders little children, among others, and yet somehow Sladek keeps us laughing."

== Reviews ==
- Review by Faren Miller (1983) in Locus, #275 December 1983
- Review by Chris Bailey (1984) in Vector 118
- Review by Brian Stableford (1984) in SF & Fantasy Review, March 1984
- Review by Joseph Nicholas (1985) in Paperback Inferno, #52
- Review by Richard E. Geis (1985) in Science Fiction Review, Summer 1985
- Review by Don D'Ammassa (1986) in Science Fiction Chronicle, #79 April 1986
- Review [French] by Richard Comballot (1987) in Fiction, #382
- Review by uncredited (2001) in Vector 216
- Review by Simon Ings (2001) in The Third Alternative, #27
- Review by Stephen E. Andrews and Nick Rennison (2006) in 100 Must-Read Science Fiction Novels

== Sources ==
- Rennison, Nick and Stephen A. Andrews. 100 Must-Read Science Fiction Novels. London: A & C Black, 2007. ISBN 0-7136-7585-3.
