= The Great Wall of Mexico (short story) =

- Short story by John Sladek
- Country: United States
- Language: English
- Genre: Science fiction

Publication
- Published in: Bad Moon Rising: An Anthology of Political Forebodings
- Publication type: Anthology
- Publisher: Harper & Row
- Media type: hardback
- Publication date: 1973

"The Great Wall of Mexico" is a science fiction short story by American writer John Sladek. It was first published in the 1973 anthology Bad Moon Rising: An Anthology of Political Forebodings edited by Thomas M. Disch. It was also published in Sladek's 1977 collection Keep the Giraffe Burning and uploaded to the online science fiction magazine Sci Fiction on December 21, 2005.

In reviewing Bad Moon Rising: An Anthology of Political Forebodings, The Magazine of Fantasy and Science Fiction columnist Joanna Russ said "John Sladek's 'The Great Wall of Mexico' attacks its subject by way of an eerie, funny, subversive, almost-surrealism quite impossible to describe; you may get some of the flavor of it if I tell you that the FBI is using retired Senior Citizens to listen to bugged conversations in public places, and that one of them, loyal as he is, vows after his first two hours' excruciating listening that he will never say anything dull in a public place again."
