= Bill Bailey (American actor) =

American actor and author

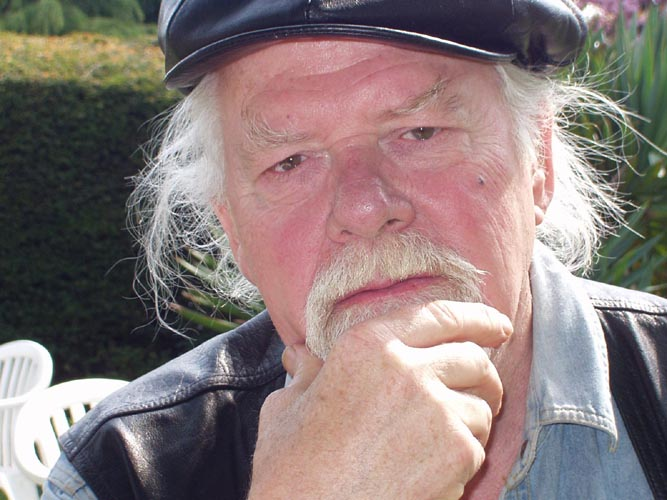
- Born: September 2, 1938 (age 87); North Carolina, US
- Occupations: Author, actor
- Website: redbillbailey.com

Bill Bailey (born September 2, 1938) is an American actor and author, primarily providing supporting roles in film and television throughout the 1970s, 1980s and 1990s. He appeared in Superman (1978), Superman II (1980), and Haunted Honeymoon (1986), as well as a number of British television programs including Yes, Prime Minister (1987), Jeeves and Wooster (1992), and Agatha Christie's Poirot (1993). He has also narrated an abridged version of Herman Melville's novel Moby Dick.

A number of Internet databases have misattributed his work to the British comedian Bill Bailey.

== Life and career ==
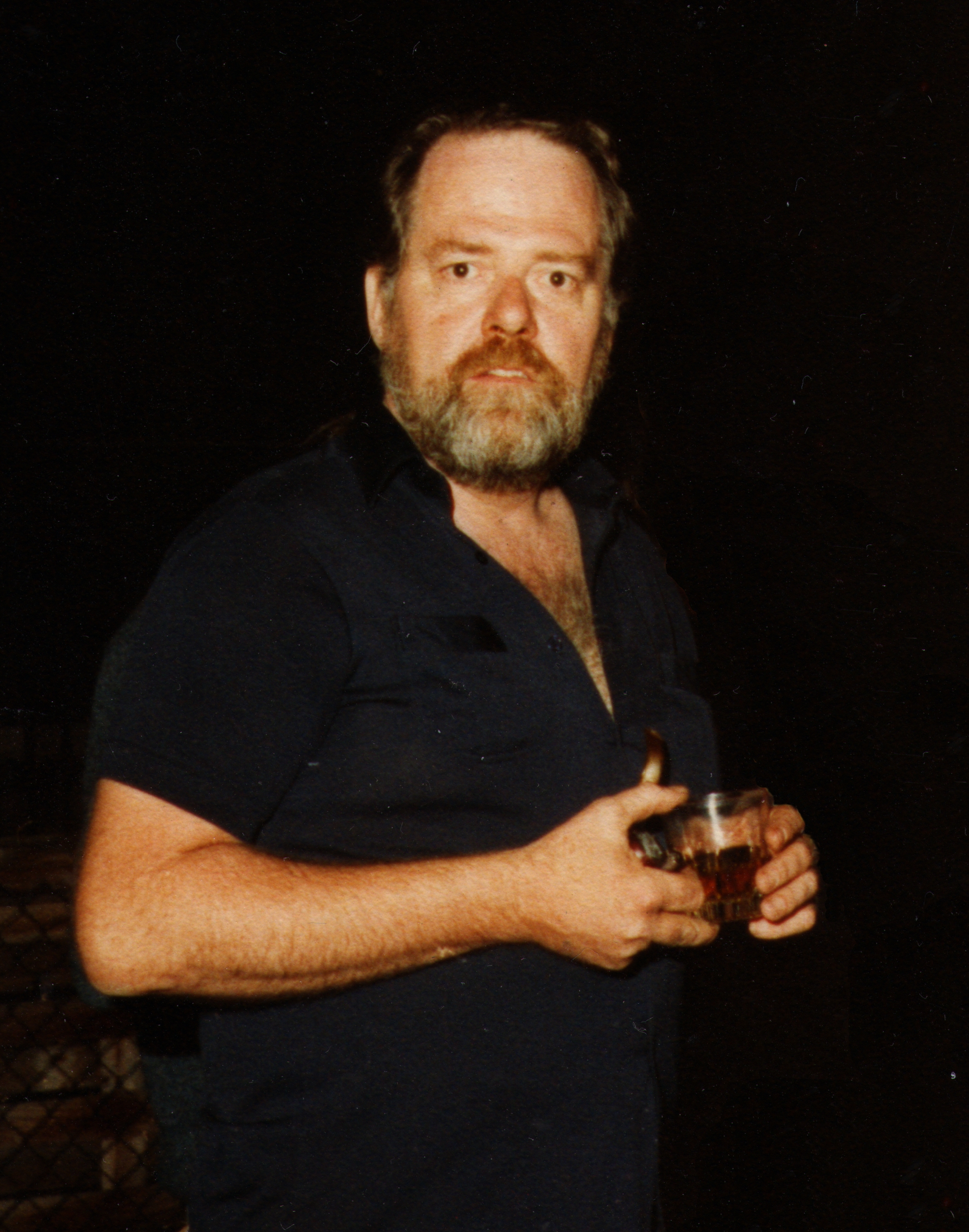
Bill Bailey as himself c.1984 Clutching a shot of whisky and one of his beloved pipes.

Bailey was born in a small rural town in North Carolina and attended Sanford Central High School. He graduated from the University of North Carolina in 1960 with a degree in philosophy, spent some time in the US Army, and then as prison guard in Canada. He married a Texan heiress, and moved to Houston, Texas where he managed a ranch and took part in motorbike scrambling and sports car rallying. He worked as a bouncer, and later organized the first white collar union in the US meat-packing industry. Soon after taking up acting he moved to London in 1968 and within a year of his arrival he became the first full-frontal male nude on the British stage at the Almost Free Theatre, London. He has acted in film, television and on London's West End stage.

He is the author of seven published books, most notably Taping Whores (2004).

== Bibliography ==
- Split Infinities, 2000, ISBN 1587210924
- Rolling Thunder, 2001, ISBN 0759644403
- Comedians of Violence, 2003, ISBN 1410734412
- Taping Whores, 2004, ISBN 1418418153.
- Times Two, 2004, ISBN 1414021496
- Is Alice?, 2009, ISBN 1847478980
- The Ghost Society, 2009, ISBN 9781849910842

== Filmography ==
Year	Title	Role	Notes
1971	Doomwatch	Reporter	TV series (1 episode: "Flight Into Yesterday")
1971	Brett	Barman	TV series (1 episode: "The Hollow Men")
1973	The Rivals of Sherlock Holmes	Drunk	TV series (1 episode: "Five Hundred Carats")
1974	The Groove Tube	Suc Muc Dik	
1976	The New Avengers	Cary	TV series (1 episode: "Three Handed Game")
1978	Superman	2nd Senator	(Missile Control)
1980	Superman II	J.J.	
1981	Outland	Hill	
1982	Emery Presents: Legacy of Murder	Cameraman	TV series (1 episode: "Bang, Bang You're Dead")
1983	Philip Marlowe, Private Eye	Hugo Candless	TV series (1 episode: "Nevada Gas")
1984	Master of the Game	Tim O'Neill	TV mini-series
1984	Tales of the Unexpected	Bob	TV series (1 episode: "Have a Nice Death")
1985	The Last Place on Earth	Prison Warder	TV mini-series (1 episode: "Rejoice")
1985	Water	Hollister	
1985	Lace II	Chief of Police	TV film
1986	If Tomorrow Comes	Priest	TV mini-series
1986	The American Way	General Motors	aka Riders of the Storm
1986	Haunted Honeymoon	The Host	
1986	Sky Bandits	Sheriff	
1987	Ishtar	General Westlake	
1987	Heat and Sunlight	Barney	
1987	Howards' Way	Karl Hanson	TV series
1987	Yes, Prime Minister	US Vice-president	TV series (1 episode: "A Diplomatic Incident")
1989	The Nightmare Years	Knick Knickerbocker	TV mini-series documentary
1989	Around the World in 80 Days	Captain Phillips	TV mini-series (3 episodes)
1989	Tygo Road	Spinnij	TV mini-series (5 episodes)
1989	Coded Hostile	Military	TV film
1989	Murder Story	Billy van Wyck / Keelman	
1989	Frederick Forsyth Presents	Frank Terpil	TV series (1 episode)
1991	Drop the Dead Donkey	Earl	TV series (1 episode: "The Evangelist")
1992	Notorious	Judge	TV film
1992	Jeeves and Wooster	Alexander Worple	TV series (1 episode: "Cyril and the Broadway Musical")
1992	Immaculate Conception	American Consul	
1993	Agatha Christie: Poirot	Felix Bleibner	TV series (1 episode: "The Adventure of the Egyptian Tomb")
1993	Death Train	G.N.N. Newscaster	TV film
1993	Dominion: Tank Police	Skeleton (voice)	Video
1994	The Day Today	Judge	TV series (1 episode)
1995	Balto	Butcher	Voice
1997	Brass Eye	Fr. Pierre Runek and an Eyewitness	TV series (2 episodes)
1997	April Fool's Day	Sand delivery man	TV film
1999	Eureka Street	John Evans	TV mini-series (1 episode)
2001	Just Visiting	Thibault's Father	
2002	Micawber	Willis Gates II	TV series (1 episode: "Micawber Meets the Americans"), (final appearance)

== Theatre appearances ==
Year	Title	Role	Theatre	Notes
1970	Player Piano	Kroner	Almost Free	
1971	Threepenny Opera	Walt	Prince of Wales Theatre/Piccadilly Theatre	With Vanessa Redgrave and Barbara Windsor
1972	Bakke's Night of Fame	Cell Guard	Shaw Theatre	
1973/74	The Front Page	Schwartz	National Theatre	
1974	Wind in the branches of the Sassafras		Watermill	
1974	Guys and Dolls	Big Jule	Birmingham Rep	
1974	Grand Manoeuvres	Général Picon	National Theatre	
1974	The Freeway		National Theatre	
1974/75	Robin Hood	Little John	Birmingham Rep	
1975	Al Capone	Capone	Watermill	
1975	Sea Change		Traverse Theatre	
1980	Happy Birthday Wanda	Ryan	Bush Theatre	
1980	Geography of a Horse Dreamer	Father	Royal Court Theatre	with Bob Hoskins
1982	Daughter's of Men		Hampstead Theatre	With Frances de la Tour
1981	Private Dick	Shamey	Newcastle Playhouse	
1986	Insignificance	Senator	Theatre Royal, Plymouth	
1990	Bus Stop	Will Masters	Watford Palace Theatre/Lyric Theatre, London	With Jerry Hall
1987	After the Fall	Chairman	National Theatre	
1993	The Rose Tattoo	Salesman	Peter Hall Company /Playhouse Theatre	
1994	Conversations with My Father		Scarborough Theatre/The Old Vic	
1998	The Madras House		Edinburgh Lyceum & Lyric Theatre, London	
1999	Small Craft Warnings		The Pleasance, Edinburgh	
