= Roderick at Random =

1983 novel by John Sladek

Roderick at Random is a novel by John Sladek published in 1983. It is the sequel to Roderick, or The Education of a Young Machine (1980); both novels were reissued together in 2001 as The Complete Roderick.

== Plot summary ==
Roderick at Random is a novel in which Roderick the robot tries to learn about what it means to be human.

== Reception ==
Dave Langford reviewed Roderick at Random for White Dwarf #39, and stated that "The first worthwhile SF to arrive in 1983 is John Sladek's Roderick at Random [...] Sladek's satire is merciless, hilariously pointing out how humans prefer not to think for themselves, programmed by newspapers, tranquillizers, food fads or batty cults becoming much more predictable and less rational than poor Roderick. Sad, but not far from being true."

Dave Pringle reviewed Roderick at Random for Imagine magazine, and stated that "It's a crazy, venal, hilarious world that Sladek creates. while Roderick himself is beautiful, a saint."

== Reviews ==
- Review by Faren Miller (1983) in Locus, #268 May 1983
- Review by Cherry Wilder (1983) in Foundation, #29 November 1983
- Review by David Pringle (1985) in Science Fiction: The 100 Best Novels
- Review by L. J. Hurst (1990) in Vector 157
