= Michael Lloyd (special effects artist) =

Visual effects artist

- Other name: Mike Lloyd
- Occupation: Visual effects artist
- Years active: 1981–present

Michael Lloyd is a special effects artist who was nominated at the 58th Academy Awards in the category of Best Visual Effects for his work on the film Return to Oz. He shared his nomination with Zoran Perisic, Will Vinton, and Ian Wingrove.

== Selected filmography ==
- Raiders of the Lost Ark (1981)
- Baby: Secret of the Lost Legend (1985)
- Return to Oz (1985)
- Superman IV: The Quest for Peace (1987)
- Dick Tracy (1990)
- Independence Day (1996)
- The Lord of the Rings: The Fellowship of the Ring (2001)
- The Lord of the Rings: The Two Towers (2002)
- The Chronicles of Narnia: The Lion, the Witch and the Wardrobe (2005)
- Avatar (2009)
