= Front projection effect =

In-camera visual effects process

A front projection effect is an in-camera visual effects process in film production for combining foreground performance with pre-filmed background footage. In contrast to rear projection, which projects footage onto a screen from behind the performers, front projection projects the pre-filmed material over the performers and onto a highly reflective background surface.

== Description ==
In contrast to rear projection, in front projection the background image is projected onto both the performer and a highly reflective background screen, with the result that the projected image is bounced off the screen and into the lens of a camera. This is achieved by having a screen made of a retroreflective material such as Scotchlite, a product of the 3M company that is also used to make screens for movie theaters. Such material is made from millions of glass beads affixed to the surface of the cloth. These glass beads reflect light back only in the direction from which it came, far more efficiently than any common surface.

The actor (or subject) performs in front of the reflective screen with a movie camera pointing straight at them. Just in front of the camera is a one-way mirror angled at 45 degrees. At 90 degrees to the camera is a projector which projects an image of the background onto the mirror which reflects the image onto the performer and the highly reflective screen; the image is too faint to appear on the actor but shows up clearly on the screen. In this way, the actor becomes their own matte. The combined image is transmitted through the mirror and recorded by the camera. The technique is shown and explained in the "making-of" documentary of the 1972 sci-fi film Silent Running.

Front projection was invented by Will Jenkins. For this he holds U.S. patent 2,727,427, issued on December 20, 1955 for an "Apparatus for Production of Light Effects in Composite Photography" and U.S. patent 2,727,429, issued the same day for an "Apparatus for Production of Composite Photographic Effects."

It was first experimented with in 1949, shortly after the invention of Scotchlite, and had appeared in feature films by 1963, when the Japanese film Matango used it extensively for its yacht scenes. Another early appearance was in 1966, during the filming of 2001: A Space Odyssey. The actors in ape suits were filmed on a stage at Elstree Studios and combined with footage of Africa (the effect is revealed in the leopard's glowing eyes reflecting back the light). Dennis Muren used a very similar solution for his 1967 debut film Equinox, although Muren's technique didn't employ Scotchlite. Two British films released in 1969, On Her Majesty's Secret Service and The Assassination Bureau, used the technique, as did the 1968 films Barbarella and Where Eagles Dare.

=== Zoptic ===
Front projection was chosen as the main method for shooting Christopher Reeve's flying scenes in Superman. However, they still faced the problem of having Reeve actually fly in front of the camera. Effects wizard Zoran Perisic patented a new refinement to front projection that involved placing a zoom lens on both the movie camera and the projector. These zoom lenses are synchronized to zoom in and out simultaneously in the same direction. As the projection lens zooms in, it projects a smaller image on the screen; the camera lens zooms in at the same time, and to the same degree, so that the projected image (the background plate) appears unchanged, as seen through the camera. However, the subject placed in front of the front projection screen appears to have moved closer to the camera; thus Superman flies towards the camera. The technique is analogous to the more commonly discussed dolly zoom effect.

Perisic called this technique "Zoptic". The process was also used in two of the Superman sequels (but not used in the fourth movie due to budget constraints), Return to Oz, Radio Flyer, High Road to China, Deal of the Century, Megaforce, Thief of Baghdad, Greatest American Hero (TV), as well as Perisic's films as director, Sky Bandits (also known as Gunbus) and The Phoenix and the Magic Carpet.

=== Introvision ===
Introvision is a front projection composite photography system using a pair of perpendicular reflex screens to combine two projected scenes with a scene staged live before the camera in a single shot.

It allows foreground, midground and background elements to be combined in-camera: such as sandwiching stage action (such as actors) between two projected elements, foreground and background.

In its simplest form, images from a projector are directed at a beam splitter oriented at forty-five degrees. Two retro reflective screens are used, one to return the reflected image and one to return the pass through image. Set between the beam splitter and the retro reflective screens are mattes with cut outs that allow the projected image to strike each retro reflective screens in select areas. This combination, as seen by the camera, gives the appearance of images behind the actors (reflected image) and in front of the actors (pass through image). The camera sees the pass through image on the reverse side of the beam splitter and the reflected image through the beam splitter and combines the two eliminating the need for compositing in post production. To compensate for the large difference in the distance from the camera to the two screens an additional lens is used in the pass through image path.

The more complicated setup involves the use of two cameras, two projectors and multiple beam-splitters, light traps, filters and aperture control systems. This setup provides the opportunity to use different content for foreground and background.

Introvision was first used in 1980–81 during the filming of the science-fiction movie Outland to combine star Sean Connery and other performers with models of the Io mining colony. It was also used in the telefilm Inside the Third Reich to place actors portraying Adolf Hitler and Albert Speer in the long-destroyed Reichstag, as well as Under Siege, Army of Darkness and The Fugitive, where it seemed to place Harrison Ford on top of a bus that was then rammed by a train. Adventures in Babysitting employed IntroVision to place children in multiple situations of peril such as hanging from the rafters and scaling the "Smurfit-Stone Building" in Chicago, and Stand By Me used IntroVision during the train sequence. Most movie companies brought small units to the Introvision sound stages near Poinsettia and Santa Monica Boulevard in Hollywood, California. Scenes were often shot near the end of the production schedule to allow for the shooting of "live" plates to have been done while on location.

== Front projection versus other techniques ==
Compared to back projection, the front projection process used less studio space, and generally produced sharper and more saturated images, as the background plate was not being viewed through a projection screen. The process also had several advantages over bluescreen matte photography, which could suffer from clipping, mismatched mattes, film shrinkage, black or blue haloing, garbage matte artifacts, and image degradation/excessive grain. It could be less time-consuming, and therefore less expensive, than the process of optically separating and combining the background and foreground images using an optical printer. It also allowed the director and/or director of photography to view the combined sequence live, allowing for such effects to be filmed more like a regular sequence, and the performers could be specifically directed to time their actions to action or movement on the projected images.

However, advancements in digital compositing and the increasing use of digital cameras have made digital the most common method of choice. The last major blockbuster to extensively use front projection was the Sylvester Stallone action thriller Cliffhanger from 1993. More recently, the film Oblivion made extensive use of front projection (though not retro-reflective) to display various sky backgrounds in the home set. Spectre also used this technique for its snow mountain hospital and glass building interiors. The advantages for the in-camera effect were a reduced need for digital effects and green screen, interactive lighting in a reflective set, and to provide a real background for the actors.

== See also ==
- Film production
- Pepper's ghost

== Sources ==
- Perisic, Zoran (2000). Visual Effects Cinematography. Focal Press. ISBN 978-0-240-80351-7.
- Nakano, Teruyoshi – special effects director assistant (2005). Matango: Attack of the Mushroom People (DVD). Media Blasters.
