= Ian Wingrove =

English special and visual effects artist (1944–2023)

- Publicity Photo of Ian Wingrove
- Born: 15 March 1944; England
- Died: 30 December 2023 (aged 79); England
- Occupations: Special and visual effects artist

Ian Wingrove (15 March 1944 – 30 December 2023) was an English special and visual effects artist. He was nominated for an Academy Award in the category Best Visual Effects for the film Return to Oz.

Wingrove was born in the south of England on 15 March 1944, and died on 30 December 2023, at the age of 79.

== Selected filmography ==
- Return to Oz (1985; co-nominated with Will Vinton, Zoran Perisic and Michael Lloyd)
