= The Lunatics of Terra =

1984 short story collection by John Sladek

The Lunatics of Terra is a collection of science fiction short stories by John Sladek, published in 1984.

== Contents ==
- "The Last of the Whaleburgers"
- "Great Mysteries Explained"
- "Red Noise"
- "Guesting"
- "Absent Friends"
- "After Flaubert"
- "The Brass Monkey"
- "White Hat"
- "The Island of Dr Circe"
- "Answers"
- "Breakfast with the Murgatroyds"
- "The Next Dwarf"
- "An Explanation for the Disappearance of the Moon"
- "How To Make Major Scientific Discoveries at Home in Your Spare Time"
- "The Kindly Ones"
- "Fables"
- "Ursa Minor"
- "Calling All Gumdrops!"

== Reception ==
Dave Langford reviewed The Lunatics of Terra for White Dwarf #57, and stated that "He's especially good on pseudoscience, getting right inside that viewpoint in the tragicomic 'An Explanation for the Disappearance of the Moon'. Topnotch stuff."

== Reviews ==
- Review by Chris Morgan (1984) in Fantasy Review, September 1984
- Review by Edward James (1984) in Vector 122
- Review by Andrew M. Butler (2006) in Vector 247
