= Sky Bandits (1986 film) =

- Directed by: Zoran Perisic
- Written by: Thom Keyes
- Produced by: Richard Herland
- Starring: Scott McGinnis; Jeff Osterhage; Ronald Lacey; Miles Anderson; Nicholas Lyndhurst
- Cinematography: David Watkin
- Edited by: Peter Tanner
- Music by: Alfi Kabiljo
- Production companies: J&M Entertainment; London Front
- Distributed by: Entertainment Film Distributors (United Kingdom); Galaxy International Releasing (United States)
- Release dates: 31 October 1986 (United States); 10 July 1987 (United Kingdom)
- Running time: 105 minutes
- Country: United Kingdom
- Language: English
- Budget: $18 million
- Box office: $2,295,500

Sky Bandits, also known as Gunbus, is a 1986 British adventure film about two outlaws from the Wild West, drafted to the battlefields of WWI, who enlist in the fledgling Royal Flying Corps flying early warplanes called gunbuses.

The film was directed by Zoran Perisic and made extensive use of the Zoptic technique he had developed for the flying sequences on Superman (1978). The production holds the record for the largest film crew on a fiction film (582).

== Plot ==
Caught after a series of dynamite-fuelled bank robberies in the dying days of the Old West, Barney (Scott McGinnis) and Luke (Jeff Osterhage) are forced into conscription in a US unit being sent to the trenches in France in the middle of World War I.

In the maelstrom of the frontlines, Barney and Luke use their gunslinging skills to shoot the pilot of a low-flying German bomber. Using the chaos to abscond from their unit, they impersonate two British RFC officers to sneak into an officer's mess, whereupon after a night of drinking they are challenged to prove themselves by piloting a Vickers F.B.5 (known as a "Gunbus"). They succeed in flying the plane, getting lost and briefly glimpsing a huge experimental German airship hidden in the clouds. Landing by coincidence at an RFC squadron base, their sighting of the airship proves enough to persuade the squadron's commander to offer them a place in his unit.

Still seeking a way out of the conflict, Barney and Luke use their newfound position to steal two planes at gunpoint, intending to fly to Switzerland. On their route they accidentally find themselves at the airship's hangar, where Luke is shot down and captured. Barney turns back to find his squadron's base has been destroyed by the airship, along with all of the squadron's planes. Defying orders once again he recovers the Gunbus and flies off, secretly landing near the hangar. Finding Luke is being held captive inside a bank, he uses his previous familiarity with blowing open bank vaults to break Luke free, before the two of them attempt to destroy the airship.

The airship takes off, and Barney and Luke pursue in the Gunbus. In the air they are joined by the rest of the squadron, who are flying an array of improvised novelty planes designed by the squadron's crazy engineer Fritz (Ronald Lacey). The squadron engages in an aerial battle with the airship as Barney and Luke land on top and use their six-shooters and dynamite to force the airship's captain to surrender.

Back in the Old West, Barney and Luke blow another bank up before racing off on horseback as they had before the war. As a posse hunt them down they are surprised however to see the pair disappear only to reappear flying over their heads in a Gunbus. As the credits roll, Barney and Luke continue to argue with each other over whether to fly to Mexico – itself deep in the midst of its own war.

== Cast ==
- Scott McGinnis as Barney
- Jeff Osterhage as Luke
- Ronald Lacey as Fritz
- Miles Anderson as Bannock
- Nicholas Lyndhurst as Chalky
- Ingrid Held as Mitsou
- Valerie Steffen as Yvette
- Keith Buckley as Commander Von Schlussel
- Terence Harvey as Canning
- Ted Maynard as Big Jake
- Bill Bailey as Sheriff
- John Cassady as Deputy Rezin
- Bill Reimbold as Bank Manager
- Margaret Nolan as Waitress

== Production ==
The film was directed by Zoran Perisic, a Yugoslavian who moved to the UK when he was 15. He moved into special effects and did the flying work on Superman (1978). He was known in the industry as "the man who made Superman fly".

Perisic learned how to speak English by watching films at a cinema in Huddersfield and later said "I suppose you could say the Western scene in Gunbus is kind of a Western hommage to Huddersfield".

The film claimed to be the biggest wholly independent movie made in Britain in 1985, with a reported budget of £13 million. The film took eight years and three million dollars to get into production. It was produced by American Rick Herland, whose previous film Steppenwolf took seven years to go into production.

Perisic came on board the project in 1982 to work on its effects. Brian G. Hutton was meant to direct. However a few weeks before filming was to start Hutton pulled out. Herland said, "He [Hutton] wasn't prepared to bet with us unless the money was on the table. And since we didn't have the money from the City Institutions to make the movie until a week before filming you can see there was a problem. Zoran had been on the film for so long and always wanted to direct, it just seemed perfectly logical then to let him do so."

The film was shot at Pinewood Studios.

== Reception ==
The film was released in the US as Sky Pirates with a $3.5 million ad campaign but the film was a financial failure. It opened on Friday, October 31, 1986, in 1,335 theatres in the United States, the only wide release that weekend, and grossed $1,468,500 for the weekend, finishing in eighth place. Its total gross was $2,295,500.

Dave Kehr of the Chicago Tribune observed: "Everything that touches the human element in Sky Bandits is tritely conceived and flatly filmed. That is a shame, because it's otherwise a very handsome movie, photographed in dark, contrasty color by the great David Watkin (Help, Chariots of Fire) and loaded with lush period production values. But this is probably what you get when you hire a special effects technician to direct your film, even if the special effects technician is as talented as Zoran Perisic, the man who devised the flying sequences for the Superman movies."

In the Chicago Sun-Times, Roger Ebert negatively compared the film to the drawings of airplanes Bruce McCall had been known to publish in the National Lampoon: "If you like McCall's work, you may like certain scenes in 'Sky Bandits.' If not, you won't. The design of the airplanes in this movie is its single, lonely, redeeming facet. Everything else is surprisingly boring, given the fact that the movie cost a reported $17 million to make. The plot involves aerial battles in World War I, but the dialogue rolls along at about the level and intensity of a couple of fraternity kids making plans for the weekend."

In The New York Times, Vincent Canby described the film as "a charmless comedy", stated that "the screenplay, the direction and the performances are terrible", and observed that McGinnis' and Osterhage's characters "are intended to recall (but don't) Butch Cassidy and the Sundance Kid." He did, however, have a positive opinion on its production design:

What gives the film its isolated moments of distinction are the fanciful flying machines conceived by Tony Woollard, the movie's production designer. They include what appear to be a Model-T Ford with wings, a six-engine bomber and a fearsome dirigible a half-mile long with the armament of a World War II battleship. Mr. Woollard's designs look like Jules Verne ideas as they might have been executed by Ronald Searle.

Patrick Goldstein of the Los Angeles Times said the film "has a few inspired comic touches which might work well with younger audiences, but its heroes are so hokey and its plot so pokey that it never zooms into high gear."
