= The Steam-Driven Boy and other Strangers =

The Steam-Driven Boy and other strangers
- First edition
- Author: John Sladek
- Illustrator: Colin Hay
- Language: English
- Genre: Science fiction collection
- Publisher: Panther Books
- Publication date: July 1973
- Publication place: United Kingdom
- Media type: Print (Paperback)
- Pages: 189 pp
- ISBN: 978-0586038017
- OCLC: 822409

The Steam-Driven Boy and other strangers is a science fiction short story collection by John Sladek, published in 1973.

== Contents ==
- "The Secret of the Old Custard" (1966) (also known as "The Babe in the Oven")
- "The Aggressor" (1969)
- "The Best-Seller" (1966)
- "Is There Death on Other Planets?" (1966)
- "The Happy Breed" (1967)
- "A Report on the Migrations of Educational Materials" (1968)
- "The Singular Visitor from Not-Yet" (1968)
- "The Short, Happy Wife of Mansard Eliot" (1971)
- "The Momster" (1969)
- "1937 A.D.!" (1967)
- "Secret Identity" (1970)
- "The Transcendental Sandwich" (1973)
- "The Steam-Driven Boy" (1972)

The Parodies:

- "The Purloined Butter...*dg*r *ll*n P**" (1972)
- "Pemberly's Start-Afresh Calliope or, The New Proteus...H.G. W*lls" (1971)
- "Ralph 4F...H*g* G*rnsb*ck (Hugogre N. Backs)" (1973)
- "Engineer to the Gods...R*b*rt H**nl**n (Hitler I.E. Bonner)" (1972)
- "Broot Force...*s**c *s*m*v (Iclick As-I-Move)" (1972)
- "Joy Ride...R*y Br*db*ry (Barry DuBray)" (1972)
- "The Moon Is Sixpence...*rth*r C. Cl*rk* (Carl Truhacker)" (1981)
- "Solar Shoe-Salesman...Ph*l*p K. D*ck (Chipdip K. Kill)" (1973)
- "One Damned Thing After Another...C*rdw**n*r Sm*th (A Co-ordainer's Myth)" (1981)
- "The Sublimation World...J.G. B*ll*rd (J.G. B----)" (1968)
