= Outland (film) =

1981 film by Peter Hyams

- Theatrical release poster
- Directed by: Peter Hyams
- Written by: Peter Hyams
- Produced by: Richard A. Roth; Stanley O'Toole
- Starring: Sean Connery; Peter Boyle; Frances Sternhagen; James B. Sikking; Kika Markham
- Cinematography: Stephen Goldblatt
- Edited by: Stuart Baird
- Music by: Jerry Goldsmith
- Production company: The Ladd Company
- Distributed by: Warner Bros. (through Columbia-EMI-Warner Distributors)
- Release date: May 22, 1981 (US)
- Running time: 109 minutes
- Countries: United Kingdom; United States
- Language: English
- Budget: $14 million (estimated)
- Box office: $17–20 million

Outland is a 1981 science fiction thriller film written and directed by Peter Hyams and starring Sean Connery, Peter Boyle and Frances Sternhagen.

Set on Jupiter's moon Io, it has been described as a space Western and bears narrative and thematic resemblances to the 1952 film High Noon.

The film depicts a new marshal who begins work at a mining facility on the moon Io. There he discovers a dirty secret, but runs into dead ends as he tries to uncover those behind it, who also attempt to silence him.

== Plot ==
Federal Marshal William O'Niel is assigned to a tour of duty at the titanium ore mining outpost Con-Am 27, operated by the company Con-Amalgamated on the Jovian moon of Io. Conditions on Io are difficult; gravity is one-sixth that of Earth's with no breathable atmosphere, and spacesuits are cumbersome with limited air. Shifts are long, but significant bonuses are paid. The general manager, Mark Sheppard, boasts that productivity has broken all records since he took over. Carol, O'Niel's wife, feels she cannot raise their son Paul on Io and leaves with him to the Jupiter space station to await a shuttle back to Earth. Cane, a miner, enters an elevator without his spacesuit during a psychotic episode and dies from decompression. Tarlow, another miner, suffers an attack of stimulant psychosis — he sees spiders and rips open his — resulting in death by explosive decompression. With the reluctant assistance of Dr. Lazarus, O'Niel investigates the deaths.

Another incident involves a worker, Sagan, who takes a prostitute hostage and threatens to kill her with a knife. O'Niel attempts to calm the man while Montone, his sergeant, sneaks in via the air duct and kills Sagan with a shotgun. O'Niel and Lazarus discover that Sagan had traces of polydichloric euthimal, a powerful amphetamine-type drug in his bloodstream, which would allow miners to work continuously for days at a time until they burn out and turn psychotic after approximately ten months of use. O'Niel uncovers a drug distribution ring run by Sheppard and sanctioned by now-repentant Montone.

Using surveillance cameras, O'Niel finds and captures Nicholas Spota, one of Sheppard's dealers, who is murdered before he can be questioned. Montone is found garrotted. In a meat locker, O'Niel finds the latest shipment of drugs, which was shipped from the space station. He is attacked there by another dealer, Russell Yario. O'Niel, wearing an anti-garrotting collar, knocks him out, then destroys the shipment of drugs. When Sheppard finds out, he threatens O'Niel and contacts his drug distributor, asking him to send in professional hitmen. O'Niel is prepared, having hacked into Sheppard's communications.

O'Niel waits for the arrival of the hitmen on a supply shuttle from the other side of Jupiter. Realizing what is coming and with only Dr. Lazarus willing to help him, O'Niel sends a message to his family promising to return to Earth when his "job is done". O'Niel ambushes the assassins one by one. Lazarus helps him kill the first by trapping him in a pressurized corridor; O'Niel activates a bomb, causing an explosive decompression that kills the man. The second is killed in a glass greenhouse structure of the outpost when O'Niel tricks him into shooting a window, causing it to break open and blow him out to his death.

O'Niel is then confronted and attacked by Sheppard's inside man — one of his own deputies, Sgt. Ballard. The two fight outside the outpost near the satellite structure until O'Niel pulls Ballard's oxygen hose, suffocating him as he pushes him into an electrical generation station, vaporizing him on impact. O'Niel then confronts the surprised Sheppard inside the outpost's recreation bar, knocking him out with one punch. It is implied Sheppard will now be brought to justice or murdered by his own associates. O'Niel, however, has already contacted his superiors about Sheppard's associates, some of whom are Con-Am executives, and shortly before his departure receives a communication that warrants have been issued for their arrests. (Note: This plot point is not shown in all versions of the film, including the one available from the Amazon Prime streaming service.) O'Niel bids farewell to Lazarus and leaves on the shuttle to join his wife and son on the journey back to Earth.

== Cast ==
- Sean Connery as Marshal William T. O'Niel
- Peter Boyle as Mark Sheppard
- Frances Sternhagen as Dr. Marian Lazarus
- James B. Sikking as Sergeant Montone
- Kika Markham as Carol O'Niel
- Nicholas Barnes as Paul O'Niel
- Clarke Peters as Sergeant Ballard
- Steven Berkoff as Sagan
- John Ratzenberger as Tarlow
- Bill Bailey as Hill
- James Berwick as Rudd
- Norman Chancer as Officer Slater
- Stuart Milligan as Officer Walters
- Hal Galili as Officer Nelson
- Anni Domingo as Officer Morton
- Manning Redwood as Officer Lowell
- Angus MacInnes as Hughes
- Eugene Lipinski as Cane
- Pat Starr as Flo Spector
- Sharon Duce as Prostitute Attacked By Sagan
- Marc Boyle as Nicholas Spota
- Richard Hammatt as Russel Yario
- P. H. Moriarty as Hitman #1
- Angelique Rockas as Maintenance Woman
- Doug Robinson as Hitman #2

== Production ==
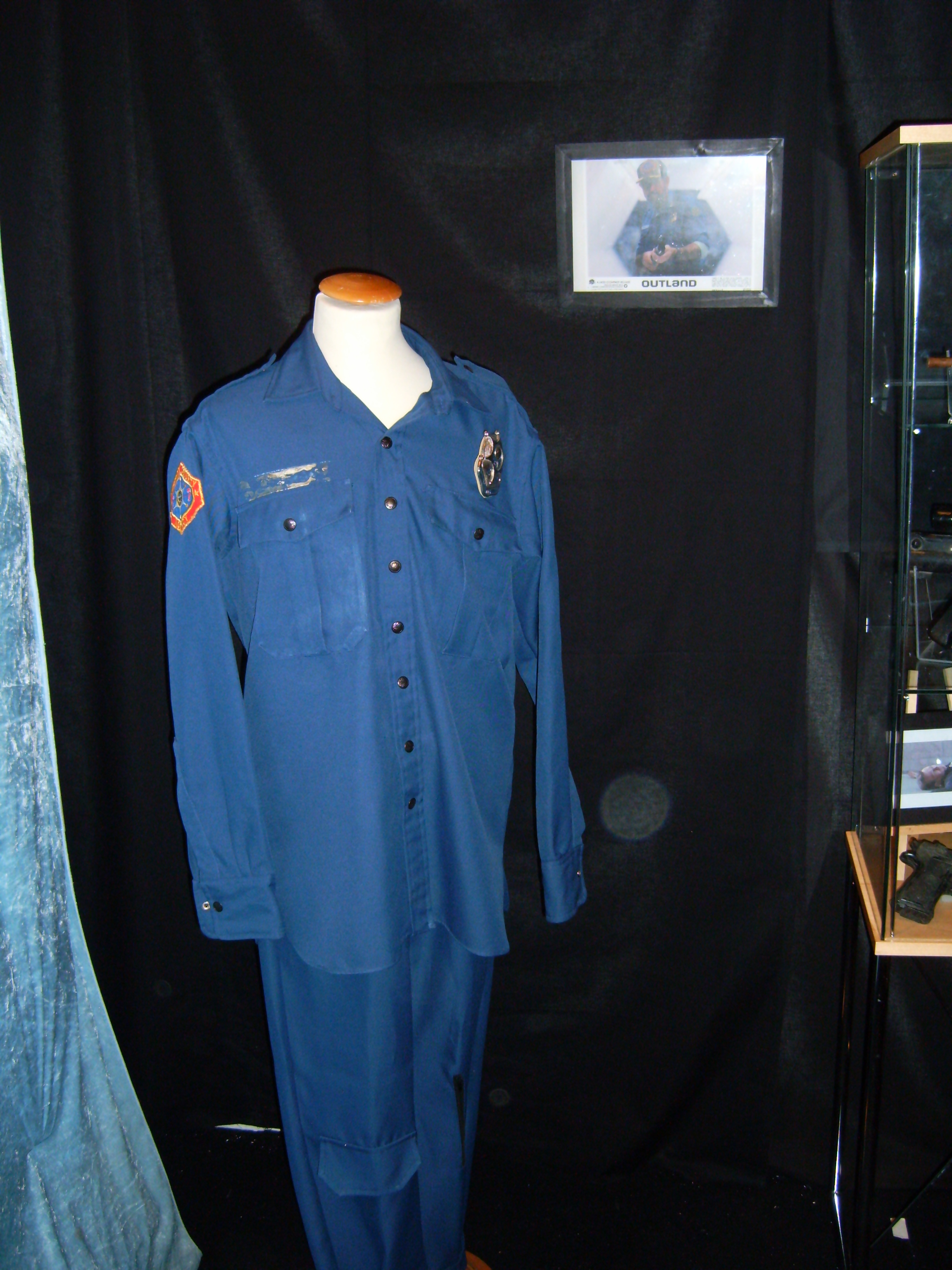
O'Niel's costume at a SciFiWorld convention in Stockholm, Sweden

=== Development ===
Hyams recalled,

I wanted to do a Western. Everybody said, 'You can't do a Western; Westerns are dead; nobody will do a Western'. I remember thinking it was weird that this genre that had endured for so long was just gone. But then I woke up and came to the conclusion — obviously after other people — that it was actually alive and well, but in outer space. I wanted to make a film about the frontier. Not the wonder of it or the glamour of it: I wanted to do something about Dodge City and how hard life was. I wrote it, and by great fortune Sean Connery wanted to do it. And how many chances do you get to work with Sean Connery?

The film was developed at Universal by Hyams and producer Richard Roth. Universal turned it down, then Roth, who had a development deal at 20th Century Fox under Alan Ladd Jr, took the project to Ladd's new company, The Ladd Company.

Outland was filmed at Pinewood Studios, Iver Heath, Buckinghamshire, UK, with an initial budget of $12 million.

The film's working title was "Io" after the setting of the film. This was later changed, because many people read it as the number 10, or "Lo" ("low"). Principal photography took place starting with the miniature models in May 1980 and with the actors beginning in June 1980. Post-production for the film was completed in February 1981.

Outland was pioneering as the first motion picture to use Introvision, a variation on front projection that allows foreground, mid-ground and background elements to be combined in the camera, as opposed to using optical processes such as bluescreen matting. This enabled characters to convincingly walk around miniature sets of the mining colony.

Though he received sole credit as cinematographer, Stephen Goldblatt has said in interviews that he was only hired because of union requirements, as Hyams had always intended to do the job on his own and could use Goldblatt as a scapegoat if the Introvision photography went wrong. Though angered by the deception, Goldblatt realized quitting the film could have serious repercussions for his career, as he had only one feature film credit at the time, and stayed on, being put in charge of shots involving Introvision and miniature effects. He described working on the film as an important learning experience, but not a happy one.

== Soundtrack ==
The music to Outland was composed and conducted by veteran composer Jerry Goldsmith, who had previously worked with writer/director Peter Hyams on the science fiction thriller Capricorn One (1978) and had recently provided the soundtrack to Alien, which had a style similar to that of Outland, reflecting isolation, remoteness and fear. The soundtrack to Outland has been released three times on disc: 19 November 1993, through GNP Crescendo (with his score to Capricorn One), June 2000 through Warner Music Group, and a two-disc extended edition released 15 June 2010, through Film Score Monthly. The expanded release also includes the John Williams music for the Ladd Company logo, the material composed by Morton Stevens for the fight between O'Niel and Ballard and the source cues for the recreation room by Michael Boddicker.

The distributed 35 mm film prints have Dolby Stereo audio and the 70 mm anamorphic blow-up film prints featured six-track Dolby stereo audio. All 70 mm prints were encoded for a Megasound option, in which theaters needed to be outfitted with more speakers and sound equipment. Outland was one of four films released by Warner Bros. Pictures to officially make use of their Megasound movie theater sound system in the early 1980s.

== Reception ==
=== Box office ===
The film received mixed reviews and box office reception when it was released. It opened strongly with $3,059,638 in weekend box office receipts in the U.S. According to The New York Times on its opening weekend the film was "sensational in Los Angeles and on New York's East Side" but "played poorly in many small cities. By platforming Outland – opening it in less than 350 theaters to allow it to build an audience rather slowly – the company gambled that the movie would appeal to ticketbuyers; the picture will be in trouble if it drops off at the box office this weekend."

Total estimated box offices receipts in the country wound up being between $17,374,595 and $20,000,000, just above its $14 million budget.

=== Awards ===
The film was nominated for the Academy Award for Best Sound (John Wilkinson, Robert W. Glass Jr., Robert Thirlwell and Robin Gregory). The film was also nominated for six Saturn Awards: Best Science Fiction Film, Best Writing (Peter Hyams), Best Score (Jerry Goldsmith), Best Special Effects (John Stears), Best Actor (Sean Connery), and Best Supporting Actress (Frances Sternhagen). Sternhagen won, but was the film's sole award recipient.

=== Critical ===
Gary Arnold at The Washington Post had this to say: "In Outland, writer-director Peter Hyams has adapted the plot of High Noon to an intriguing sci-fi environment—a huge titanium mine located on Io, a volcanic moon of Jupiter. But the conventions that worked for High Noon break down in the high-tech atmosphere of Outland and the story seems trite and dinky".

In The Boston Globe, Michael Blowen was more favorable: "The parallels between Outland and Fred Zinnemann's 1952 Western High Noon are apparent. Writer-director Peter Hyams has transported the characters and motifs from the dusty frontier town of Gary Cooper to the frontiers of space. While Hyams keeps the story barreling along, he also develops a corollary anti-capitalist theme. Io is an outpost for exploitation, and [...] whether the miners are digging gold in the Colorado hills or titanium on Jupiter's moon, the greed of the corporate class will prevail. Outland marks the return of the classic Western hero in a space helmet. His outfit has changed and his environment has expanded but he's still the same. When Connery stares down the barrel of that shotgun, you'd better smile".

Desmond Ryan at The Philadelphia Inquirer called it: "A brilliant sci-fi Western. In many ways, Hyams has made a film that is more frightening than Alien, because he surmises that space will change us very little and the real monsters we are liable to encounter will be in the next space suit."

Christopher John reviewed Outland in Ares Magazine #10 and commented that "Outland is a good movie, and not just for science fiction fans. Its success will undoubtedly inspire a few tired, low-grade imitations. Hopefully, it will inspire a few more solid, interesting and entertaining films as well."

C. J. Henderson reviewed Outland for Pegasus magazine and stated that "Connery was the perfect Marshall."

On Rotten Tomatoes, Outland holds a rating of 58% from 33 reviews. Metacritic, which uses a weighted average, assigned the film a score of 48 out of 100, based on 10 critics, indicating "mixed or average" reviews.

=== Scientific accuracy ===
In 2023 Ryan Ogliore, a planetary scientist proposing an Io exploration mission for NASA's New Frontiers program, noted that the activity depicted as occurring on the surface of Io in Outland is unrealistic since the moon's orbit within Jupiter's magnetosphere means it is subject to intense ionizing radiation that would be fatal to humans within hours. The film also does not depict the intense volcanic and seismic activity on Io's surface, discovered by Voyager 1 several years prior to its production.

== Home media ==
Outland was first released for home video on VHS, Beta, and V2000 videotape formats in November 1982. The film had many re-issues on VHS and between 1982 and 1998, including a widescreen NTSC VHS on 7 January 1997. Videodisc releases included the CED disc in August 1983, a LaserDisc release in 1984, and a remastered LaserDisc with digital audio on 28 August 1991.

Outland was released on DVD on 18 November 1997. It was presented in both letterbox widescreen and full screen on a double-sided disc with the soundtrack remastered in Dolby 5.1 surround sound. The Region 1 DVD received harsh criticism for its poor quality transfer, and absence of enhancement for widescreen televisions. A "making of" featurette, cast and credit notes, plus a theatrical trailer are included as special features on the disc. The film was released on DVD in the UK (Region 2) in 1998. This version is anamorphically enhanced for widescreen televisions, as is the Region 4 release. Outland was released on Blu-ray disc on 10 July 2012. The film is presented in an aspect ratio of 2.40:1 with an English DTS-HD Master Audio 5.1 surround sound mix. The disc also features a brand new commentary audio-track with the director Peter Hyams.

A brand new 4K restoration of Outland from the original 35 mm camera negative by Arrow Video was released in the UK on 3 November 2025, and a day later in the United States. The release includes a 4K (2160p) UHD Blu-ray presentation in Dolby Vision (HDR10 compatible), original lossless stereo 2.0 and DTS-HD MA 5.1 surround audio options and a selection of new special features.

== North American airings ==
=== Pay television ===
Outland debuted on pay TV in the U.S. in September 1982 on the HBO and Showtime channels. In Canada, the film was first shown in October 1983 on Superchannel. The film was broadcast uncut, commercial-free, and periodically over several months, in both countries. These pay TV broadcasts of Outland used the same source as the initial NTSC home video release.

=== Network television ===
The network TV premiere for Outland was on 19 May 1984, via CBS in the U.S. and was simulcasted on CTV in Canada. This re-edited version of the film, broadcast exclusively on these networks, utilized cut footage not seen in the theatrical/home video version. One notable example is an extended scene showing a more lengthy exit from the station for O'Niel and also Ballard near the end of the film suited-up while exiting; these cutting-room-floor scenes were made available for the network to extend parts of the film which allowed them to sell more commercial slots to advertisers. The inclusion of left-over footage (if made available) was common practice during the 1970s to 1980s, for network film premieres and subsequently licensed broadcasts. This version was labeled "edited for television" to comply with U.S. network television censorship standards of the time and never released to home video.

== Adaptations ==
- A comic strip adaptation of Outland illustrated by Jim Steranko appeared in Heavy Metal magazine in the July 1981 to October 1981, and January 1982 issues.
- A novelization of Outland written by Alan Dean Foster was published by Warner Books in March 1981.
- A large-format photonovel titled Outland: The Movie Novel: Edited by Richard J. Anobile from the Screenplay by Peter Hyams was published by Grand Central Publishing in 1981. It was promoted as including "over 750 full-color photographs".
- A song based on Outland called "High Moon" was written by Star One (a side project of Ayreon composer Arjen Lucassen) for the Space Metal album.
- On 18 August 2009, Warner Bros. announced that director Michael Davis had been hired to direct a remake of the film from a script by Chad St. John. No casting or start date information was announced.

== See also ==
- Explosive decompression myth
- Moon (2009 film)
- Byford Dolphin accident
