= Introvision =

Late-20th-century analog visual effects technology enabling instant composites

Introvision was a variation on a front-projection process that allowed film makers to view a finished composite of live action and plate photography through the camera's viewfinder on set and in real time. Beginning with Outland in 1981, the process allowed visual effects to be composited in-camera, eliminating the need to wait for photo-chemical compositing.

Introvision could also place actors 'inside' a plate, allowing them to appear behind objects in a two-dimensional background. The technique was used in The Fugitive with a train superimposed behind actor Harrison Ford).

The system faded from use around 1994, with the adoption of digital compositing and match moving, which allowed more advanced combinations of live action and computer-generated imagery.

== The Introvision system ==
The front projection screen - custom made from thousands of pentagonal-shaped Scotchlite pieces to eliminate seam lines which might show on the finished film - sits at the far end of the stage. Despite its formidable size, a four-man crew could mount the screen on its tubular steel frame and erect the system in about two hours. On the opposite end of the stage is the compact projector/camera unit. As with other front-projection systems, Introvision made use of the light reflectance characteristics of the Scotchlite screen, which returns light to its source virtually undiminished, but only directly in line with that source. At oblique angles, the light intensity drops off drastically and the image dissipates. Therefore, in order to apply this phenomenon photographically, both projector and camera must be positioned along precisely the same axis - a physical impossibility sidestepped by the employment of a beam splitter. The beam splitter, mounted at a 45-degree angle to the projector axis, aligns the projected image directly to the camera's focal plane, even though the camera and projector are actually positioned at right angles to each other. The mirrored beam-splitter kicks part of the projected image up onto the screen, but being semi-transparent, also allows the camera to see through it, and thereby record the image reflected back.

Actors and set pieces were placed directly in front of the screen, because the projected image was so brilliant, the intensity of light needed to balance 'live' elements to the screen obliterated the projected image from anything in the foreground. Since the projector and camera were in perfect alignment, the foreground elements themselves blocked any unwanted shadows that they may have cast on the screen.

== Origins of the Introvision process ==
Introvision was created by John Eppolito, who was a stage magician and hypnotist. He spent most of his adult life working as a radio producer and director for ABC, and then in the early 1970s transitioned to film production. Along with USC film student Les Robley, Eppolito set up shop in a garage tinkering with front projection. Introvision International was formed, expanded, and operated from 1980 to 2000 by President Tom Naud, Visual Effects Supervisor William Mesa, and Studio Facility Builder, Set Builder and Studio Manager Issachar Issy Shabtay. Darkman Art Director Ric Scott who also has a credit in Darkman model shop.

== Notable uses ==
Introvision was used in Darkman (1990) and Army of Darkness (1992) and The Fugitive (1993). In Fearless (1993), a scene with an imploding airplane interior was created using a miniature set in Introvision's own studios.

== See also ==
- The Volume
