= The Müller-Fokker Effect =

1970 novel by John Sladek

- First edition
- Author: John Sladek
- Cover artist: Bill Botten
- Language: English
- Genre: Science fiction novel
- Publisher: Hutchinson
- Publication date: June 1970
- Publication place: United States
- Media type: Print (hardcover)
- Pages: 214
- ISBN: 0-09-102480-3

The Müller-Fokker Effect is a satirical science fiction novel written by John Sladek in 1970. The first UK edition was published by Hutchinson with cover design by Bill Botten. It has long been out of print in the United States, having come out in a Pocket Books edition in 1973. A reprint was done in 1990 by Carroll & Graf. The title is a pun with the insult motherfucker, and the book itself is suffused with wordplay of all stripes.

== Synopsis ==
The time is "somewhere in the near future" from the 1970s, and Bob Shairp is a government worker for a project in which a human being's individual qualities can be stored as computer data — on Müller-Fokker tapes.

These reel-to-reel tapes, flesh pink in color, can store an entire person's identity in four tapes. The people recorded on the tapes can be reconstructed by encoding the tapes' data into a virus and infecting someone with that virus (see mind uploading). Of course, that person would have to be backed up too, and a game of musical chairs is set in motion.

Bob Shairp is being recorded for test purposes on the tapes when there is an accident and the chair he is sitting in explodes, destroying his body. Only from the tapes can he be resurrected.

This somewhat conventional science-fiction premise is something of a MacGuffin, as the novel's other major characters struggle to possess the Müller-Fokker tape in numerous subplots that satirize various prominent forces in 1970s America, including the military, evangelism, men's magazines, and radical anticommunist groups such as the John Birch Society. The novel also focuses heavily on parallels between the right-wing politics of Sladek's time and Nazism: one main character is closely based on Adolf Hitler, recast as a semi-literate American racist obsessed with African Americans.

== Reception ==
Locus editor Charles N. Brown described it as "a Vonnegut-type black humor novel that starts out very well but goes on much too long with much too much crammed into it." However, he said "the first 100 pages are really excellent." Analog Science Fiction and Fact critic P. Schuyler Miller noted "it was like Ron Goulart's farces, only with more cutting edge—let's say, Goulart programmed by a Swift tape." In 1970 the public reception of the book however was low, and Sladek stopped writing science fiction novels that decade.

== Translations ==
The book received an early German translation as Der Müller-Fokker-Effekt (1970), published by W. Gebühr and was also translated into French as L'Effet Müller-Fokker (1974) and published by Éditions Opta.

== In pop culture ==
In the comic book series Camelot 3000, Joan Acton is seen reading the novel.

== Trivia ==
The book's original blurb reads: "This, and only this, is the genuine novel of our time. Accept no imitations."

Presciently, though in a satirical context, the US president is Ronald Reagan.

The cover of the French translation of the book, published by Editions Opta, includes an image of comic book character Spider-Man shooting heroin.

== Sources ==
- Clute, John; Peter Nicholls (1995) [1993]. The Encyclopedia of Science Fiction (2nd ed.). New York: St. Martin's Griffin. p. 1386. ISBN 978-0-312-13486-0.
