= The Best of Walter M. Miller, Jr. =

1980 collection of science fiction short stories by Walter M. Miller, Jr.

- Cover of first edition
- Author: Walter M. Miller, Jr.
- Cover artist: Mara McAfee
- Language: English
- Series: The Best of ... series
- Genre: Science fiction
- Publisher: Pocket Books
- Publication date: 1980
- Publication place: United States
- Media type: Print (paperback)
- Pages: vii, 472
- ISBN: 0-671-83304-9
- OCLC: 6476960
- Preceded by: The Best of Damon Knight
- Followed by: The Best of John Sladek

The Best of Walter M. Miller, Jr. is a collection of science fiction short stories by American author Walter M. Miller, Jr.. It was first published in paperback by Pocket Books in May 1980 as the ninth volume in its Best of ... series, with a hardcover book club edition following in October of the same year from Pocket Books/SFBC. The book has been translated into German.

== Previous versions ==
The book combined the contents of three previous collections, Conditionally Human (Ballantine Books, 1962), The View from the Stars (Ballantine Books, January 1965), and The Science Fiction Stories of Walter M. Miller, Jr., an omnibus of the previous two collections (Gregg Press, December 1978), plus two added stories, "The Lineman" and "Vengeance for Nikolai."

== Subsequent versions ==
The book was subsequently reissued in paperback by Corgi Books as two shorter collections, Conditionally Human and Others Stories and The Darfstellar and Other Stories, both in 1982. The collection was released as an audio MP3 CD by Dreamscape Media in April 2021, and as a digital audio download by the same publisher in May of the same year. It was also released as an audio CD and audio MP3 CD by Blackstone Publishing in May 2021. The first British edition was issued in trade paperback by Gollancz in July 2000, and reprinted by Gollancz/Orion under the title Dark Benediction in April 2007 and August 2015. Ebook editions were issued under the same title by Gollancz/Orion and Gateway/Orion in May 2013 and 2015, respectively.

== Summary ==
The book contains fourteen novelettes, novellas, and short stories by the author. Stories marked CH were previously collected in Conditionally Human (1962); stories marked VS were previously collected in The View from the Stars (1965); stories marked SF were previously collected in The Science Fiction Stories of Waler M. Miller, Jr. 1978); stories marked NW are new to the collection; stories marked CO were subsequently collected in Conditionally Human and Other Stories (1982); stories marked DO were subsequently collected in The Darfstellar and Other Stories (1982).

== Contents ==
- "You Triflin' Skunk!" (1955) - VS, SF / DO
- "The Will" (1954) - VS, SF / DO
- "Anybody Else Like Me?" (1965) - VS, SF / CO
- "Crucifixus Etiam" (1953) - VS, SF / DO
- "I, Dreamer" (1953) - VS, SF / DO
- "Dumb Waiter" (1952) - VS, SF / CO
- "Blood Bank" (1952) - VS, SF / CO
- "Big Joe and the Nth Generation" (1952) - VS, SF / DO
- "The Big Hunger" (1952) - VS, SF / CO
- "Conditionally Human" (1952) - CH, SF / CO
- "The Darfsteller" (1955) - CH, SF / DO
- "Dark Benediction" (1951) - CH, SF / CO
- "The Lineman" (1957) - NW / DO
- "Vengeance for Nikolai" (1957) - NW / DO

== Awards ==
The book placed eleventh in the 1981 Locus Poll Award for Best Single Author Collection.

== Reception ==
The book was reviewed (in German) Reclams Science Fiction Führer, 1982, as well as in Vector 213, 2000, and by Andrew Spong in Big Sky, #3: SF Masterworks 1, 2014.
