= Return to Oz =

1985 film by Walter Murch

- Theatrical release poster by Drew Struzan
- Directed by: Walter Murch
- Screenplay by: Walter Murch; Gill Dennis
- Based on: The Land of Oz and Ozma of Oz by L. Frank Baum
- Produced by: Paul Maslansky
- Starring: Nicol Williamson; Jean Marsh; Piper Laurie; Fairuza Balk
- Cinematography: David Watkin (Note: Freddie Francis was uncredited for his contribution.)
- Edited by: Leslie Hodgson
- Music by: David Shire
- Production companies: Walt Disney Pictures; Silver Screen Partners II
- Distributed by: Buena Vista Distribution Co. (United States); Walt Disney Productions; UK Film Distributors (United Kingdom)
- Release date: June 21, 1985 (United States)
- Running time: 110 minutes
- Countries: United States; United Kingdom
- Language: English
- Budget: $28 million
- Box office: $11.1 million (USA)

Return to Oz is a 1985 dark fantasy film serving as an unofficial sequel to the 1939 Metro-Goldwyn-Mayer film The Wizard of Oz, and is based on L. Frank Baum's early 20th century Oz novels, mainly being a combination of The Land of Oz (1904) and Ozma of Oz (1907). Produced by Walt Disney Pictures and Silver Screen Partners II, the film was co-written and directed by Walter Murch in his directorial debut. It stars Nicol Williamson, Jean Marsh, Piper Laurie, and Fairuza Balk as Dorothy Gale in her first screen role. The plot follows an insomniac Dorothy, who returns to the Land of Oz to find it has been conquered by the cruel Nome King and his wicked accomplice Princess Mombi. Dorothy must restore Oz with her newfound friends Billina, Jack Pumpkinhead, Tik-Tok, and the Gump.

In 1954, Walt Disney Productions bought the film rights to Baum's remaining Oz books to use in the television series Walt Disney's Disneyland; this led to the proposed live-action film The Rainbow Road to Oz, which was never completed. Murch suggested making another Oz film in 1980. Disney approved the project as they were due to lose the film rights to the series. Though MGM was not involved in the production, Disney had to pay a large fee to use the ruby slippers created for the 1939 film. Return to Oz fell behind schedule during production, and, following a change of Disney management, Murch was briefly fired.

Return to Oz was released in theaters on June 21, 1985. It performed poorly at the box office, grossing $11.1 million in the United States on a $28 million budget, and received mixed reviews, with critics praising the visual style, special effects, and faithfulness to the books, but criticizing it for its scary imagery. The film performed well outside the US, and has since acquired a cult following from fans of the Oz books who regard it as more faithful to Baum's works than the 1939 film. It received an Oscar nomination for Best Visual Effects.

== Plot ==
The film is set six months after the events in The Wizard of Oz. Dorothy Gale's continued obsession with the Land of Oz concerns her Aunt Em and Uncle Henry that she may be delusional. They take Dorothy to a sanatorium, where Dr. Worley intends to perform electrotherapy on her, but she is rescued by a young girl, who warns her that Worley damages his patients. Worley's assistant, Nurse Wilson, pursues them as they escape in the middle of a storm to a nearby river, where Dorothy loses sight of the other girl as she floats downstream aboard a chicken coop.

Dorothy wakes up in Oz with her chicken, Billina, who can now talk. Following the damaged yellow brick road they reach the Emerald City, which is in ruins and all its citizens, including the Tin Man and Cowardly Lion, turned to stone. They are seized by the Wheelers -- creatures with wheels at the ends of their limbs -- but are saved by Tik-Tok, a mechanical man who explains that he was told by Scarecrow, the king of Oz, to await Dorothy's return. In search of Scarecrow, they visit the castle of Princess Mombi, who wears the different heads of the women of Oz. After revealing that Scarecrow is being held prisoner by the Nome King, the one responsible for the devastation of Oz, she imprisons the group, intending to take Dorothy's head for her collection.

Locked in a tower, the group encounters Jack Pumpkinhead, who explains that he was brought to life by Mombi's Powder of Life. To escape, the group constructs a flying creature from furniture and the head of the Gump, a moose-like animal, and Dorothy steals the powder from Mombi to bring him to life. Discovering them, Mombi has the Wheelers pursue the Gump as he flies the group cross the Deadly Desert to the Nome King's mountain. The Gump eventually tires and crashes on the mountain, where Dorothy is briefly reunited with Scarecrow, before the Nome King turns him into an ornament. The Nome King offers each member of the group three attempts to identify the Scarecrow in a room full of ornaments, but The Gump, Jack, and Tik-Tok all fail and are turned into ornaments themselves. Before Dorothy begins her turn, the Nome King reveals he has her lost ruby slippers, which he used to conquer Oz, and offers to use them to send her home instead, but Dorothy refuses.

Dorothy enters the ornament room and makes two guesses as Mombi reaches the mountain. With her final guess, Dorothy selects a green gem, which turns into Scarecrow; realizing that the inhabitants of Oz become green objects, Dorothy finds and restores Jack and the Gump. Enraged, the Nome King imprisons Mombi for allowing Dorothy's escape, then grows to gigantic size and attempts to eat the group, until Billina, hiding in Jack's head, lays an egg in the king's mouth, fatally poisoning him. Dorothy retrieves the ruby slippers and hurriedly puts them on as the subterranean Nome kingdom collapses; she wishes for the group to return to the restored Emerald City, where they find a green medal on the Gump's antler that Dorothy restores into Tik-Tok. When Dorothy is subsequently asked to be the Queen of Oz, but she desires to return home, Princess Ozma -- the girl from the sanitorium and rightful ruler of Oz, who was imprisoned in a mirror by Mombi -- is freed and ascends the throne. Dorothy gives Ozma the ruby slippers, and she uses them to send Dorothy home, promising that she can return to Oz again if she wishes, while Billina chooses to remain.

Dorothy wakes up and is found beside a riverbank in Kansas by Toto and Aunt Em, who tells her the clinic burned down and everyone except Worley survived, while Nurse Wilson was arrested for assisting in Worley's experiments. Dorothy returns home and sees Ozma and Billina through her bedroom mirror; she calls for Aunt Em, but they signal for her to keep Oz a secret.

== Cast ==
=== Live action ===
- Fairuza Balk as Dorothy Gale
- Nicol Williamson as Dr. J. B. Worley/Nome King
- Jean Marsh as Nurse Wilson/Mombi
  - Sophie Ward as Mombi II
  - Fiona Victory as Mombi III
- Piper Laurie as Aunt Em
- Matt Clark as Uncle Henry
- Emma Ridley as the Girl at the hospital/Princess Ozma
- Justin Case as the Scarecrow
- Pons Maar as Lead Wheeler/Nurse Wilson's assistant
- Bruce Boa as Policeman
- Tansy as Toto
- John Alexander, Rachael Ashton, Robbie Barnett, Ailsa Berk, Peter Elliott, Roger Ennals, Michele Hine, Mark Hopkins, Colin Skeaping, Ken Stevens, Philip Tan and Rob Thirtle as the Wheelers

=== Voice cast ===
- Denise Bryer as Billina
- Sean Barrett as Tik-Tok
- Brian Henson as Jack Pumpkinhead
- Deep Roy as the Tin Man
- Lyle Conway as the Gump
- Pons Maar as Nome Messenger
- Beatrice Murch as the Girl at the hospital/Princess Ozma (uncredited)

=== Puppeteers ===
- Mak Wilson as Billina
- Timothy D. Rose as Tik-Tok (head operator)
  - Michael Sundin as Tik-Tok (in-suit performer)
- Brian Henson as Jack Pumpkinhead (head operator)
  - Stewart Larange as Jack Pumpkinhead (body performer)
- Lyle Conway and Steve Norrington as the Gump
- David Greenaway and Geoff Felix as the Tin Man
- Swee Lim as Cowardly Lion (head operator)
  - John Alexander as the Cowardly Lion (body performer)

== Production ==
=== Development ===
Walter Murch began development of Return to Oz in 1980, during a brainstorming session with Walt Disney Productions production chief Tom Wilhite. Murch told Wilhite he was interested in making an Oz film and Wilhite "sort of straightened up in his chair". Unbeknownst to Murch, Disney owned the rights to the Oz series and wanted to make a new film as the copyright was soon to expire. In September 1981, Disney president Ron W. Miller announced that the studio would be making the film, not as a sequel or continuation of the 1939 movie, but instead an entirely new story with a different look from the original film.

Return to Oz is based on the second and third Oz books, The Marvelous Land of Oz (1904) and Ozma of Oz (1907). The element about Tik-Tok being "The Royal Army of Oz" derives from Tik-Tok of Oz (1914), in which he is made the Royal Army of Oogaboo and also makes frequent cries of "Pick me up!" That book was itself based on a dramatic production, The Tik-Tok Man of Oz (1913). Murch also used the book Wisconsin Death Trip as a historical source for the film. Murch co-wrote the screenplay with Gill Dennis, intentionally writing a film that was unlike the original to avoid accusations of blasphemy. Executive Producer Gary Kurtz noted, "We're not trying to make a sequel, although technically the books are sequels to each other", suggesting that the movie would be more faithful to the books than the 1939 film was.

Murch took a darker take on Baum's source material than the 1939 adaptation, which he knew would be a gamble. Between the development period and actual shooting, there was a change of leadership at the Walt Disney studios (with Wilhite replaced by Richard Berger), and the film's budget increased. Despite an original $20 million budget, this eventually rose to $28 million.

The film was developed and produced without the involvement of Metro-Goldwyn-Mayer, the studio behind the 1939 film. No approval was necessary because, by 1985, the Oz books on which it was based were in the public domain, and the subsequent Oz books had been optioned to Disney many years earlier. The ruby slippers were created by MGM specifically for the 1939 film to replace the Silver Shoes of the original stories and, as the slippers remained MGM's intellectual property, a fee was paid. Another carry-over from the 1939 film was the framework in which real characters from Kansas reappeared in Oz, which Murch kept in order to keep harmony between the two films.

=== Casting ===
Fairuza Balk was one of 600 from Vancouver chosen to audition for the role of Dorothy. Having spent four days in Los Angeles during November 1983, she learned she had secured the role the following month. Speaking of the audition process, Balk said "I just burst with tears because I was so happy. It was a really big thing for me even to get an audition for a real feature film." In casting the relatively unknown Balk, who was the second youngest auditionee from around 1,000 children auditioned across eight cities, Murch said he "wanted to find somebody who might be Judy Garland's cousin once removed." Maslansky believed Balk was born to play the role, saying "She is Dorothy as described by Baum. She is also Dorothy as I think Judy Garland would have loved to play her if she were that age."

Emma Ridley was cast in the role of Ozma, which she described as "a dream come true". In preparation for the role, she would watch visual adaptions of the story and analyzed the opinions of critics of Ozma. Ridley described how she tried to make her Kansas character "very calm, very studious", opting to wear little makeup and perform barefoot, while wanting a complete difference for Ozma, who was shown with a transformed appearance and attire. There was a gap of several months between Ridley filming the Kansas scenes and the Oz scenes. Ridley, who was born in London, had her voice in the film dubbed by Beatrice Murch, daughter of Walter Murch, so that the character of Ozma would have an American-sounding voice.

Leo McKern and Christopher Lloyd were each considered for the role of Dr. J. B. Worley/The Nome King before Nicol Williamson was cast.

For the role of Billina, around 40 real chickens were available during filming, each being good for different things. Cages were tagged with the chicken's purpose, including perch, sit, carry and run to name a few, as well as chickens that would attack and others to run towards cast members. As Balk's small arms could not handle carrying a full-size chicken, a smaller one was used for those scenes. A mechanical chicken was also used for certain scenes, at times behaving so similar to a real chicken that crew in the screening room were unable to tell the difference. The dog playing the role of Toto was Tansy, a brown-eyed Border Terrier family pet. Director Walter Murch had already seen around 50 dogs before seeing Tansy.

=== Filming ===
Principal photography began on February 20, 1984, and wrapped in October 1984. Originally, filming was to be shot 75% on location, including Oz-like locations in Algeria and Italy; however, due to budget restraints from Disney, the movie was filmed entirely in the United Kingdom at Elstree Studios. Kansas scenes were filmed at Salisbury Plain, which was described as a "natural choice" by Maslansky due to its being flat and near London. The temperature at Salisbury Plain during filming was described by Maslansky as "freezing", saying of Balk that "she would cry from the cold, from the pain of the cold – but she would never complain." The original cameraman, Freddie Francis, quit after shooting the Kansas scenes due to impatience with Murch.

Once shooting began, Murch began to fall behind schedule, and there was further pressure from the studio. Five weeks into production, Disney was unhappy with the footage. By then, mostly the Kansas scenes had been shot; however, Murch was looking unwell and was fired from the role without protestation. Murch later recalled the experience, saying "had I fought back... they might have said OK, but I couldn't fight back. I felt what the soul feels after it's left the body after a car accident — pain but tremendous relief." High-profile filmmakers including George Lucas and Francis Ford Coppola supported Murch in discussions with the studio, and Murch was reinstated and finished the film. Lucas guaranteed that he would step in as replacement if any further problems emerged.

Balk and Ridley, the only two child actors on set, had limited working hours per day. Balk, who was in around 98% of all scenes, was permitted to work no more than three and a half hours each day, restricted to between 9:30 a.m. to 4:30 p.m., which included breaks and private educational tuition. Balk's privacy was carefully guarded and she was not available to meet with journalists. While Balk did her own stunts, Ridley had a stand-in. Filming for the river scenes took place in a sound stage, described by Ridley as being "like a hot Jacuzzi".

Various scenes, in particular those with the Nome King, used clay animation to achieve the desired effect. When interviewed in 2020, director and animator Doug Aberle explained the process involved in animating the Nome King and other characters with clay, including the technical difficulties encountered. Each section, such as the outside rocks with faces on, was allocated to an animator. Nome King scenes in the throne room were animated progressively, with the character initially made entirely of clay, progressing gradually closer to human form until finally portrayed by Nicol Williamson in live action. Towards the end of the film when the Nome King crumbles, Aberle explains how it took him four attempts to animate this accurately.

For other creatures humans in costumes, cables and animatronics was used to make them come to life.

The Emerald City scenes towards the end of film had to be fully reshot, as the character of Ozma was originally dressed in a gold lace dress which was deemed unsuitable during post-production. The scenes were re-shot with the actress wearing a white and green dress, described by Ridley as being "very itchy and very uncomfortable", as she had grown by the time filming took place. At one point during filming these scenes, Balk collapsed due to the high on-set temperature.

=== Post-production ===
On describing the movie compared with the 1939 version, Balk said "it's a different story and a different picture, and I didn't try to copy anything Judy Garland did. It's not that much scarier, but it isn't as bright." She enjoyed working with the cast of 30 chickens, describing them as "really sweet" and praising their acting ability. Jean Marsh said she thought Return to Oz would be easy to film, noting "I thought this picture would be a breeze, but it's difficult to hit it absolutely right." She trusted Murch's direction in making his dream a reality, describing him "like a mad, vague professor. He's totally original."

=== Music ===
The film is composed by David Shire. The Japanese version has "Keep On Dreamin'", performed by Godiego's Yukihide Takekawa, which was later re-recorded for one of his albums.

== Release ==
=== Theatrical ===
Return to Oz had its world premiere in the United States on June 21, 1985, opening in 1,300 theaters including the Radio City Music Hall in New York City. Disney spent approximately $6 million on printing and advertising to promote the film, as well as adding a scene on a Return to Oz float, including characters from the film which appeared as part of Disneyland's Main Street Electrical Parade. The film was released in London cinemas on July 11, 1985. This was the first film to use the Walt Disney Pictures logo from 1985 to 2006, which would later receive a fanfare, based on "When You Wish Upon a Star", composed by John Debney, with The Black Cauldron.

=== Home media ===
The film has been released to VHS, Betamax, Laserdisc, DVD, and Blu-ray over the years. The initial release, to VHS, Laserdisc, and Beta, occurred in December 1985 shortly after the theatrical release, with the VHS initially priced with a list price of $79.95. Disney reissued it in 1992 with alternate cover art. In 1999, Anchor Bay Entertainment, who had obtained the home video rights to several titles from Disney's live-action catalogue, issued the film on full-screen and letterbox VHS, as well as a DVD release featuring both versions. All three releases featured an intro by Fairuza Balk before the film and an interview featurette with her after it. All three versions went out of print shortly after their release.

In 2004, Disney released their own DVD, which dropped the Anchor Bay disc's fullscreen version and added anamorphic enhancement for 16:9 TVs for the widescreen version, upgraded the audio to 5.1 surround, retained the Anchor Bay disc's extras, and added four TV spots and a theatrical trailer. In 2015, Disney released a 30th Anniversary Edition of the film on Blu-ray exclusively through the Disney Movie Club, featuring a newly remastered and cleaned up transfer and DTS Master Audio 5.1 sound, but none of the bonus features from the 2004 DVD.

It is featured in the "From the Vault" film section of Disney's streaming platform, Disney+.

== Reception ==
=== Box office ===
It earned $2,844,895 in its opening weekend, finishing in seventh place and $6.5 million in the 10 days after release. After the opening weekend, Commonwealth Theaters reported that some venues took between just $300–$400, considered at the time to be poor. Jeff Love, city manager of the theater chain, believed it may have been due to a bad release time, suggesting that "they should have released it when people didn't have anything to do. It should have been before people got out and started going on vacation". Love went on to suggest that the perception of it being a children's film was another problem". It ultimately grossed $11,137,801 in North America.

=== Critical response ===
Receiving mixed reviews, the film critics aggregator Rotten Tomatoes records 59% positive reviews based on 111 reviews, its critical consensus reads, "Return to Oz taps into the darker side of L. Frank Baum's book series with an intermittently dazzling adventure that never quite recaptures the magic of its classic predecessor." Those who were familiar with the Oz books praised its faithfulness to the source material of L. Frank Baum such as author and critic Harlan Ellison who said, "It ain't Judy Garland. It ain't hip-hop. But it's in the tradition of the original Oz books."

However, many critics described its tone and overall content as too dark and intense for young children. "Children are sure to be startled by its bleakness," said The New York Times' Janet Maslin. Ian Nathan of Empire gave the film three out of five stars, saying: "This is not so much a sequel but an homage and not a good one." Canadian film critic Jay Scott felt the protagonists were too creepy and weird for viewers to relate or sympathize with: "Dorothy's friends are as weird as her enemies, which is faithful to the original Oz books but turns out not to be a virtue on film, where the eerie has a tendency to remain eerie no matter how often we're told it's not." "It's bleak, creepy, and occasionally terrifying," added Dave Kehr of the Chicago Reader. Amelie Gillette of The A.V. Club frequently refers to its dark nature as unsuitable for its intended audience of young children although it had been one of her favorite movies growing up. Other reviews described the movie as "a horror show flying under the banner of family entertainment."

Neil Gaiman reviewed Return to Oz for Imagine magazine, and stated that "Terrifying and visionary, funny and exciting, Return to Oz is one of the very best fantasy films I've ever seen."

By the time of the film's release, Ray Bolger, one of the surviving cast members from the 1939 film, said in an interview that although he had no desire to watch the film, he noted that "they have a beautiful young lady as Dorothy and what I've seen of the film looks intriguing. It might be interesting for today's young people to see another version of the story."

=== Accolades ===
The film received an Academy Award nomination for Best Visual Effects, but lost to Cocoon. The nomination was given to Will Vinton, Ian Wingrove, Zoran Perisic and Michael Lloyd. Fairuza Balk and Emma Ridley were nominated for Young Artist Awards and multiple Youthies. It received two Saturn Award nominations for Best Fantasy Film (losing to Ladyhawke) and Best Younger Actor for Fairuza Balk (who lost to Barret Oliver for D.A.R.Y.L.).

== See also ==
- List of children's books made into feature films
- Journey Back to Oz
