= Roderick (novel) =

1980 science fiction novel by John Sladek

Roderick, or The Education of a Young Machine
- First edition
- Author: John Sladek
- Language: English
- Genre: Science fiction
- Publisher: Granada
- Publication date: 13 November 1980
- Publication place: United Kingdom
- Media type: Print (Hardcover & Paperback)
- Pages: 352
- ISBN: 0-246-11437-1
- OCLC: 8412449
- Dewey Decimal: 813/.54 19
- LC Class: PS3569.L25 R64 1980
- Followed by: Roderick at Random

Roderick, or The Education of a Young Machine is a 1980 science fiction novel by American writer John Sladek. It was nominated for a Philip K. Dick Award and was followed in 1983 by Roderick at Random, or Further Education of a Young Machine. The two books were originally intended as a single longer novel, and were finally reissued together in 2001 as The Complete Roderick. It was included in David Pringle's book Science Fiction: The 100 Best Novels.

== Plot summary ==
The title character is an intelligent robot, the first to be invented. The opening chapters describe the creation of Roderick and show his mind (at first consisting of a bodiless computer program) developing through several stages of awareness. Finally, Roderick is given a rudimentary body and, through a series of misadventures, finds himself alone in the world. Due to his sketchy understanding of human customs, and intrigues surrounding the project that created him, he unwittingly becomes the center of various criminal schemes and other unfortunate events.

== Major themes ==
Though the Roderick books are in many ways serious examinations of philosophical issues surrounding the idea of intelligent machines, their plot is (typically for Sladek) propelled by energetic farce and satire. Nearly every human institution, particularly academia and government, is portrayed as grievously incompetent (the Roderick project itself is originally an elaborate fraud), and the growing computerization of modern society causes no end of trouble for people—though Roderick is able to turn it to his advantage. A running joke throughout is that although Roderick is not particularly human-looking, people are unable to believe that he is a robot or simply fail to notice, and treat him instead as an insane man or a disabled child; but, like Candide or Prince Myshkin (from The Idiot), he never complains and always seeks to please.

The story is also peppered with Sladek's usual puns and word games, and satirical jabs at other science fiction themes, particularly Isaac Asimov's Three Laws of Robotics.
