= John Sladek =

American science fiction author (1937–2000)

John Thomas Sladek
- Born: December 15, 1937; Waverly, Iowa, US
- Died: March 10, 2000 (aged 62); Minneapolis, Minnesota, US
- Occupation: Novelist
- Writing career
- Period: 1966–2000
- Genre: Science fiction
- Literary movement: New Wave

John Thomas Sladek (December 15, 1937 – March 10, 2000) was an American science fiction author, known for his satirical and surreal novels.

== Life and work ==
Born in Waverly, Iowa, in 1937, Sladek was in England in the 1960s for the New Wave movement and published his first story in the magazine New Worlds. His first science fiction novel, published in London by Gollancz as The Reproductive System and in the United States as Mechasm, dealt with a project to build machines that build copies of themselves, a process that gets out of hand and threatens to destroy humanity. In The Müller-Fokker Effect, an attempt to preserve human personality on tape likewise goes awry, giving the author a chance to satirize big business, big religion, superpatriotism, and men's magazines, among other things. Roderick and Roderick at Random offer the traditional satirical approach of looking at the world through the eyes of an innocent, in this case a robot. Sladek revisited robots from a darker point of view in the BSFA Award winning novel Tik-Tok, featuring a sociopathic robot who lacks any moral "asimov circuits", and Bugs, a wide-ranging satire in which a hapless technical writer (a job Sladek held for many years) helps to create a robot who quickly goes insane.

Sladek was also known for his parodies of other science fiction writers, such as Isaac Asimov, Arthur C. Clarke, and Cordwainer Smith. These were collected in The Steam-Driven Boy and other Strangers (1973). Under the pseudonym of "James Vogh", Sladek wrote Arachne Rising, which purports to be a nonfiction account of a thirteenth sign of the zodiac suppressed by the scientific establishment, in an attempt to demonstrate that people will believe anything. In the 1960s he also co-wrote two pseudonymous novels with his friend Thomas M. Disch, the Gothic The House that Fear Built (1966; as "Cassandra Knye") and the satirical thriller Black Alice (1968; as "Thom Demijohn").

Another of Sladek's notable parodies is a remark to the anti-Stratfordian citation of the hapax legomenon in Love's Labour's Lost: that the word "honorificabilitudinitatibus" in that play is an anagram of hi ludi, F. Baconis nati, tuiti orbi, Latin for "these plays, F. Bacon's offspring, are preserved for the world", which allegedly proves that Francis Bacon wrote the play. Sladek noted that "honorificabilitudinitatibus" was also an anagram for I, B. Ionsonii, uurit [writ] a lift'd batch, thus "proving" that Shakespeare's works were written by Ben Jonson.

Sladek returned from England to Minneapolis, Minnesota, in 1986, where he lived until his death in 2000 from pulmonary fibrosis. He was married twice, to Pamela Sladek, which ended in divorce in 1986, and to Sandra Gunter whom he married in 1994. He had a daughter from his first marriage.

== Skepticism ==
A strict materialist, Sladek subjected the occult and pseudoscience to merciless scrutiny in The New Apocrypha. The book critically examined the claims of dowsing, homeopathy, parapsychology, perpetual motion and Ufology.

== Bibliography ==
=== Science fiction novels ===
- The Reproductive System Gollancz 1968, Equinox/Avon SF Rediscovery 3 1977, Gollancz Classic SF #8 1986; as Mechasm Ace Special 1969, Pocket 1980
- The Müller-Fokker Effect Hutchinson 1970; William Morrow 1971, Panther 1972, Pocket 1973, Carrol & Graf 1990
- Roderick Granada 1980; Carroll & Graf 1987
- Roderick at Random Granada 1983, Carroll & Graf 1988
- Tik-Tok Gollancz 1983, Corgi 1984, DAW 1985 Gollancz 2001; winner of the British Science Fiction Association Best Novel award in 1984;
- Love Among the Xoids Chris Drumm (chapbook) 1984;
- Bugs Macmillan UK 1989, Paladin 1991
- Blood and Gingerbread Cheap Street (chapbook) 1990;
- Wholly Smokes Wildside 2003.

=== Science fiction collections ===
- The Steam-Driven Boy and other Strangers Panther 1973, Wildside 2005
- Keep the Giraffe Burning Panther 1977, Wildside 2004
- The Best of John Sladek Pocket 1981
- Alien Accounts Granada 1982, Wildside 2005
- The Lunatics of Terra Gollancz 1984, Wildside 2005
- Maps: The Uncollected John Sladek, edited by David Langford (2002).

=== Omnibus editions ===
- The Complete Roderick comprising Roderick and Roderick at Random Gollancz SF Masterworks #45 2001, Overlook Press 2004
- The Reproductive System / The Müller-Fokker Effect / Tik-Tok Gollancz 2013

=== Mystery novels and stories ===
- The Castle and the Key (as by Cassandra Knye) Paperback Library 1967
- "By an Unknown Hand", the first story featuring the detective Thackeray Phin, which was awarded the first prize in The Times Detective Story Competition in 1972, and published in The Times Anthology of Detective Stories (now included in the collection Maps, edited by David Langford (2002));
- Black Aura Jonathan Cape 1974, Panther 1975, a Phin novel;
- "It Takes Your Breath Away", a Phin short story, originally printed in theatre programmes for a London play, 1974 (now included in Maps);
- Invisible Green Gollancz 1977, the second Phin novel. Both Phin novels are locked room mysteries.

=== Nonfiction ===
- The New Apocrypha: A Guide to Strange Science and Occult Beliefs Stein and Day 1973, Panther 1978
- Arachne Rising: The Search for the Thirteenth Sign of the Zodiac (1977) (as James Vogh)
- The Cosmic Factor (1978) (as James Vogh)
- Judgement of Jupiter (1980) (as Richard A. Tilms)
- The Book of Clues (1984)

=== With Thomas M. Disch ===
- The House that Fear Built (1966)
- Black Alice (1968)

=== Selected short stories ===
- "The Happy Breed"
- "Elephant With Wooden Leg"
- "The Great Wall of Mexico"
- "The Discovery of the Nullitron" (with Thomas M. Disch)
