= Black Alice (novel) =

1968 novel by Thom Demijohn

- Dust-jacket from the first edition
- Author: Thom Demijohn (Thomas M. Disch and John Sladek)
- Cover artist: Virginia Fritz
- Language: English
- Genre: Contemporary literature
- Publisher: Doubleday & Co.
- Publication date: 1968
- Publication place: United States
- Media type: Print (hardback & paperback)
- Pages: 235
- ISBN: 0-11-257522-6 (hardcover reprint edition) & ISBN 2-86930-645-8 (paperback reprint edition)

Black Alice is a fantasy novel by American writers Thomas M. Disch and John Sladek (writing as Thom Demijohn), published in 1968.

In the novel, the schizophrenic heiress to a great fortune is kidnapped and held for ransom. Her kidnappers darken her skin, giving her the appearance of a Black American. The girl encounters racial injustice in the Southern United States and has an encounter with the Ku Klux Klan. She eventually realizes that the man who organized her kidnapping was her own greedy father, who is after her inheritance.

== Plot summary ==
Set in 1960s Baltimore, Maryland and Norfolk, Virginia, the novel follows Alice Raleigh, a precocious 12 year old white girl, recovering schizophrenic and heiress to a family fortune, as she is kidnapped and ransomed for a million dollars. Her kidnappers, a recently released convict working alongside her own father and three sex workers, disguise Alice by administering a pill that temporarily darkens her skin, shearing her hair and effectively hiding her in plain sight as a black child.

In their quest to evade detection, the various characters in the novel encounter the Ku Klux Klan, the FBI, northern attitudes toward race, bigotry and civil rights, sex workers and communism. By appearing to be black, Alice becomes unnoticed and learns of, experiences firsthand, and empathizes with the victims of racial injustice. Alice, being a very clever child, deduces the truth of her situation: that her own father planned her kidnapping in order to steal her inheritance (her grandfather having written both parents out of his will). Her father, Roderick Raleigh, is arrested and ultimately, Alice lives happily with her governess, mother and fortune.

== Analysis ==
This novel makes many a reference to Lewis Carroll's novel Alice in Wonderland. It has been categorized as a thriller and a social satire.
