= List of Oz characters =

List of Oz characters may refer to:

- List of Oz characters (created by Baum), from the series of fourteen books beginning in 1900 with The Wonderful Wizard of Oz
- List of Oz characters (post-Baum), from the continuation of the book series following Baum's death in 1919
- List of Oz (TV series) characters, from the American prison drama series

== See also ==
- List of Wicked characters, from the books, stage musical, and films
