= Keep the Giraffe Burning =

1977 collection of short stories by John Sladek

- First edition cover
- Author: John Sladek
- Illustrator: Peter Goodfellow
- Language: English
- Genre: Science fiction
- Publisher: Panther Books
- Publication date: 1977
- Publication place: United Kingdom
- Media type: Print (paperback)
- Pages: 205
- ISBN: 0-586-04757-3
- Dewey Decimal: 823.91

Keep the Giraffe Burning is a 1977 collection of science fiction short stories by American writer John Sladek.

== Contents ==
- Foreword
- Elephant with Wooden Leg
- The Design
- The Face
- The Master Plan
- Flatland
- A Game of Jump
- The Hammer of Evil, or Career Opportunities at the Pascal Business School
- The Locked Room
- Another Look
- Space Shoes of the Gods: An Archaeological Revelation
- The Poets of Millgrove, Iowa
- The Commentaries
- Heavens Below: Fifteen Utopias (overall title for 15 short-short stories)
  - Getting There Is (n-1/n)th the Fun
  - The Bright Side
  - Mr. and Ms. America
  - Empty Promise
  - The Paradise Problem
  - What Changed Doyster's Mind
  - Handout
  - Assessment
  - Art News
  - Pax Gurney
  - A Fable
  - Utopia: A Financial Report
  - Utopiary
  - Luck
  - A Picnic
- Scenes from Rural Life
- The Secret of the Old Custard
- Undecember
- The Great Wall of Mexico
- Afterword
