= The Happy Breed =

- Short story by John Sladek
- Country: United States
- Language: English
- Genre: Science fiction

Publication
- Published in: Dangerous Visions
- Publication type: Anthology
- Publisher: Doubleday
- Media type: Hardback
- Publication date: 1967

"The Happy Breed" is a short story by American writer John Sladek, originally published in Harlan Ellison's anthology Dangerous Visions (1967). It is Sladek's first published story.

== Synopsis ==
The last five adults discuss how their lives have improved ever since the computers took over the world and made everything better for everyone all the time.

== Reception ==
Graham Sleight called it "fine and cutting", and Keith Brooke described it as "grimly dystopian" and evidence that Sladek is "a true satirist". Algis Budrys said that "this is not an exactly new idea, nor is it newly proposed, nor does it go to any new place", published in Dangerous Visions "when Harlan got desperate for material".
